= Davide Sanguinetti =

Italian tennis player (born 1972)

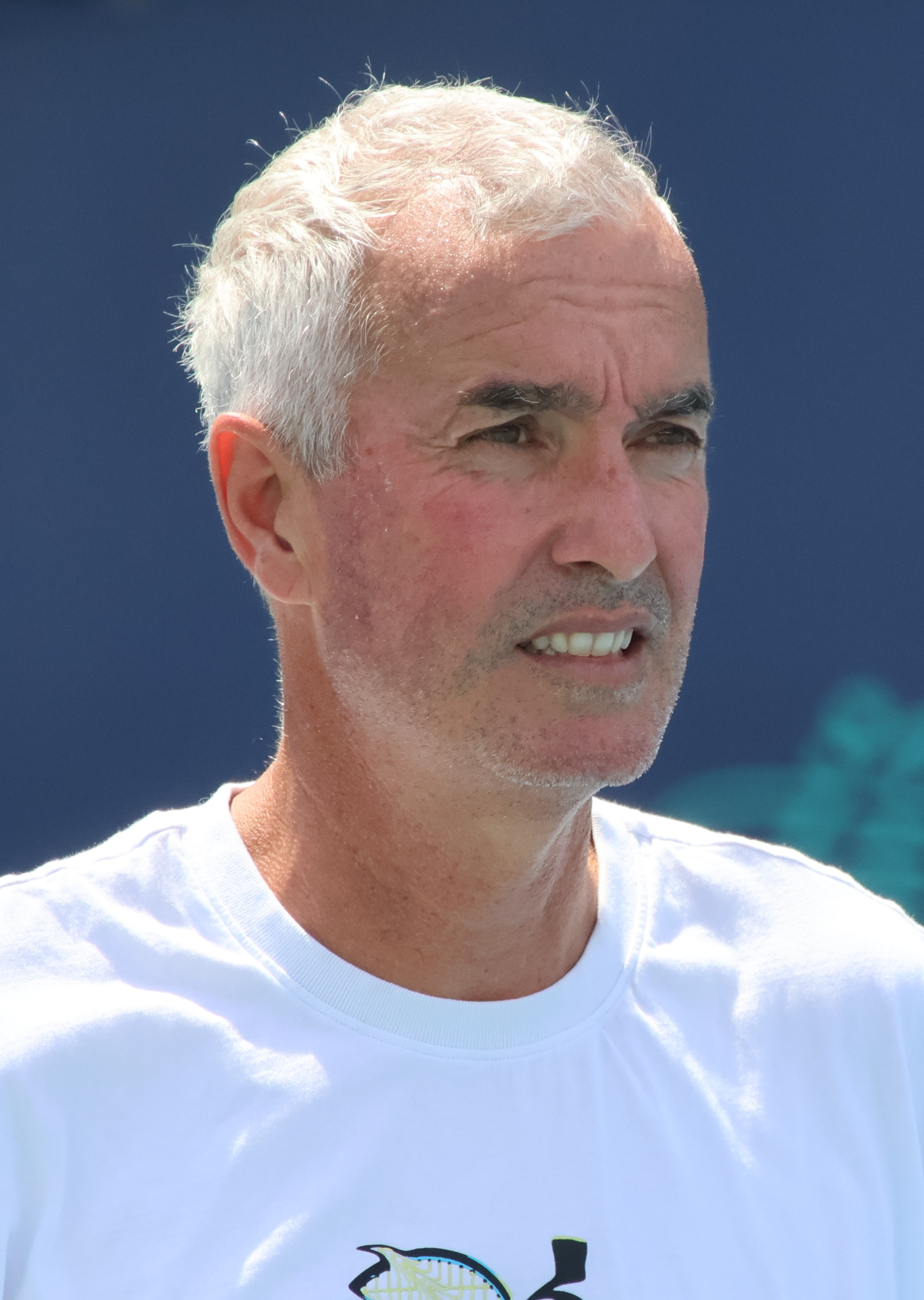
- Sanguinetti in 2025
- Country (sports): Italy
- Residence: Monte Carlo, Monaco
- Born: 25 August 1972 (age 54) Viareggio, Italy
- Height: 1.87 m (6 ft 1 1/2 in)
- Turned pro: 1993
- Retired: 2008
- Plays: Right-handed (two-handed backhand)
- Prize money: $2,935,584

Singles
- Career record: 170–244
- Career titles: 2
- Highest ranking: No. 42 (31 October 2005)

Grand Slam singles results
- Australian Open: 2R (1998, 1999, 2006)
- French Open: 3R (1999)
- Wimbledon: QF (1998)
- US Open: 4R (2005)

Doubles
- Career record: 44–80
- Career titles: 1
- Highest ranking: No. 78 (1 December 2003)

Grand Slam doubles results
- Australian Open: 1R (2003, 2004, 2006, 2007)
- French Open: 3R (2003)
- Wimbledon: 1R (2005, 2006)
- US Open: 2R (1997)

Coaching career (2008 –)
- Vince Spadea (2008–11); Go Soeda (2010); Dinara Safina (2011); …; Brandon Nakashima (2023-2025); Elena Rybakina (Feb–Aug 2025); Mark Lajal (December 2025-)
- Last updated on: 3 January 2026.

Davide Sanguinetti (Italian pronunciation: [ˈdaːvide saŋɡwiˈnetti]; born 25 August 1972) is an Italian tennis coach and former professional player.

== Personal life ==
Born in Viareggio in Tuscany, he attended the Harry Hopman academy in Florida and then UCLA. He now resides in Monte Carlo.

== Tennis career ==
Sanguinetti has won two ATP singles titles in 2002, defeating Roger Federer (Milan Indoor) and Andy Roddick (Delray Beach) in the finals, and one doubles titles (Umag 1997). His career-high singles ranking was World No. 42 (31 December 2005), and he has represented Italy in the Davis Cup since 1998.

In 1998, Sanguinetti made a run to the Wimbledon quarterfinals, defeating Johan Van Herck, Franco Squillari, Vladimir Voltchkov and Francisco Clavet before losing to Richard Krajicek in straight sets. At the 2005 US Open, Sanguinetti achieved one of the most memorable runs of his career, reaching the fourth round. He defeated Carlos Moyá and Paradorn Srichaphan – the latter in a four-and-a-half-hour match – before losing to David Nalbandian. However, he gained a bit of redemption when he upset Nalbandian in the first round of the Rogers Cup in Toronto on 7 August 2006.

Sanguinetti has a .500 record in Davis Cup matches, last playing against Zimbabwe in 2003, defeating Nigel Badza and losing to Wayne Black.

== Coaching career ==
He was the coach of Vince Spadea 2008–11, and subsequently coached Go Soeda and Dinara Safina. Starting in October 2023, he became the coach of Brandon Nakashima and Elena Rybakina for six months in 2025. He currently coaches Mark Lajal since December 2025.

== ATP career finals ==
=== Singles: 6 (2 titles, 4 runner-ups) ===
Legend Grand Slam Tournaments (0–0) ATP World Tour Finals (0–0) ATP Masters Series (0–0) ATP Championship Series (0–1) ATP International Series (2–3)	Finals by surface Hard (1–3) Clay (0–1) Grass (0–0) Carpet (1–0)	Finals by setting Outdoors (1–2) Indoors (1–1)

Result	W–L	Date	Tournament	Tier	Surface	Opponent	Score
Loss	0–1	May 1998	Coral Springs, United States	World Series	Clay	(Australia) Andrew Ilie	5–7, 4–6
Loss	0–2	Sep 2000	Tashkent, Uzbekistan	International Series	Hard	(Russia) Marat Safin	3–6, 4–6
Loss	0–3	Feb 2001	Memphis, United States	Championship Series	Hard	(Australia) Mark Philippoussis	3–6, 7–6^{(7–5)}, 3–6
Win	1–3	Jan 2002	Milan, Italy	International Series	Carpet	(Switzerland) Roger Federer	7–6^{(7–2)}, 4–6, 6–1
Win	2–3	Mar 2002	Delray Beach, United States	International Series	Hard	(United States) Andy Roddick	6–4, 4–6, 6–4
Loss	2–4	Feb 2003	San Jose, United States	International Series	Hard	(United States) Andre Agassi	3–6, 1–6

=== Doubles: 2 (1 title, 1 runner-up) ===
Legend Grand Slam Tournaments (0–0) ATP World Tour Finals (0–0) ATP Masters Series (0–0) ATP Championship Series (0–0) ATP International Series (1–1)	Finals by surface Hard (0–0) Clay (1–0) Grass (0–0) Carpet (0–1)	Finals by setting Outdoors (1–0) Indoors (0–1)

Result	W–L	Date	Tournament	Tier	Surface	Partner	Opponents	Score
Win	1–0	Jul 1997	Umag, Croatia	World Series	Clay	(Romania) Dinu Pescariu	(Slovakia) Dominik Hrbatý (Slovakia) Karol Kučera	7–6, 6–4
Loss	1–1	Feb 2006	Zagreb, Croatia	International Series	Carpet	(Italy) Andreas Seppi	(Czech Republic) Jaroslav Levinský (Slovakia) Michal Mertiňák	6–7^{(7–9)}, 1–6

== ATP Challenger and ITF Futures finals ==
=== Singles: 16 (10–6) ===
Legend ATP Challenger (10–6) ITF Futures (0–0)	Finals by surface Hard (6–2) Clay (4–4) Grass (0–0) Carpet (0–0)

Result	W–L	Date	Tournament	Tier	Surface	Opponent	Score
Loss	0–1	Apr 1997	Barletta, Italy	Challenger	Clay	(Spain) Carlos Costa	3–6, 2–6
Win	1–1	Jun 1997	Fürth, Germany	Challenger	Clay	(Sweden) Tomas Nydahl	6–4, 6–2
Loss	1–2	Jun 1997	Eisenach, Germany	Challenger	Clay	(Sweden) Tomas Nydahl	3–6, 1–6
Win	2–2	Jul 1997	Oberstaufen, Germany	Challenger	Clay	(Italy) Andrea Gaudenzi	4–6, 7–6, 6–3
Win	3–2	Apr 1998	Napoli, Italy	Challenger	Clay	(Russia) Marat Safin	6–4, 6–4
Loss	3–3	May 1998	Budapest, Hungary	Challenger	Clay	(South Africa) Marcos Ondruska	6–4, 5–7, 6–7^{(2–7)}
Win	4–3	Aug 1999	Prague, Czech Republic	Challenger	Clay	(Czech Republic) Petr Kralert	7–5, 2–6, 6–3
Win	5–3	Mar 2000	Salinas, Ecuador	Challenger	Hard	(Peru) Luis Horna	6–2, 6–2
Win	6–3	Oct 2000	Bratislava, Slovakia	Challenger	Hard	(Germany) Rainer Schüttler	7–5, 6–1
Win	7–3	Feb 2002	Wrocław, Poland	Challenger	Hard	(France) Antony Dupuis	6–3, 6–2
Win	8–3	Nov 2003	Helsinki, Finland	Challenger	Hard	(Sweden) Robin Söderling	6–4, 7–6^{(7–4)}
Loss	8–4	Jul 2004	Granby, Canada	Challenger	Hard	(United States) Michael Russell	3–6, 2–6
Loss	8–5	Aug 2004	Mönchengladbach, Germany	Challenger	Clay	(Germany) Tobias Summerer	6–7^{(4–7)}, 1–6
Loss	8–6	Mar 2005	Sunrise, United States	Challenger	Hard	(Slovakia) Karol Beck	2–6, 2–6
Win	9–6	Jul 2005	Recanati, Italy	Challenger	Hard	(Italy) Daniele Bracciali	6–4, 4–6, 6–3
Win	10–6	Jul 2006	Recanati, Italy	Challenger	Hard	(Italy) Simone Bolelli	6–4, 3–0 ret.

=== Doubles: 7 (5–2) ===
Legend ATP Challenger (5–2) ITF Futures (0–0)	Finals by surface Hard (1–1) Clay (3–1) Grass (0–0) Carpet (1–0)

Result	W–L	Date	Tournament	Tier	Surface	Partner	Opponents	Score
Win	1–0	Nov 1995	Ahmedabad, India	Challenger	Clay	(Italy) Pietro Pennisi	(United States) Ivan Baron (Portugal) João Cunha-Silva	7–6, 6–4
Loss	1–1	Oct 1997	Barcelona, Spain	Challenger	Clay	(Romania) Dinu-Mihai Pescariu	(Egypt) Tamer El Sawy (Portugal) Nuno Marques	1–6, 2–6
Win	2–1	Aug 1999	Poznań, Poland	Challenger	Clay	(Italy) Massimo Ardinghi	(United States) Hugo Armando (Russia) Andrei Cherkasov	6–4, 6–4
Win	3–1	Sep 1999	Sofia, Bulgaria	Challenger	Clay	(Italy) Massimo Ardinghi	(Socialist Federal Republic of Yugoslavia) Nebojsa Djordjevic (Socialist Federal Republic of Yugoslavia) Dušan Vemić	6–4, 6–2
Win	4–1	Nov 2003	Milan, Italy	Challenger	Carpet	(Japan) Takao Suzuki	(Poland) Mariusz Fyrstenberg (Poland) Marcin Matkowski	6–4, 7–5
Loss	4–2	Jul 2004	Granby, Canada	Challenger	Hard	(Israel) Harel Levy	(United States) Brian Baker (Canada) Frank Dancevic	2–6, 6–7^{(5–7)}
Win	5–2	Jul 2006	Recanati, Italy	Challenger	Hard	(Italy) Simone Bolelli	(Germany) Sebastian Rieschick (Serbia and Montenegro) Viktor Troicki	6–1, 3–6, [10–4]

== Performance timelines ==
Key
W	F	SF	QF	#R	RR	Q#	DNQ	A	NH

(W) winner; (F) finalist; (SF) semifinalist; (QF) quarterfinalist; (#R) rounds 4, 3, 2, 1; (RR) round-robin stage; (Q#) qualification round; (DNQ) did not qualify; (A) absent; (NH) not held; (SR) strike rate (events won / competed); (W–L) win–loss record.

=== Singles ===
Tournament	1994	1995	1996	1997	1998	1999	2000	2001	2002	2003	2004	2005	2006	2007	SR	W–L	Win %
Grand Slam tournaments
Australian Open	A	A	A	A	2R	2R	1R	1R	1R	1R	1R	1R	2R	Q1	0 / 9	3–9	25%
French Open	A	A	A	Q1	1R	3R	1R	1R	2R	1R	Q1	2R	2R	Q1	0 / 8	5–8	38%
Wimbledon	A	A	Q2	A	QF	1R	1R	2R	1R	1R	1R	2R	2R	1R	0 / 10	7–10	41%
US Open	Q1	Q1	A	1R	3R	A	1R	2R	1R	2R	1R	4R	1R	A	0 / 9	7–9	44%
Win–loss	0–0	0–0	0–0	0–1	7–4	3–3	0–4	2–4	1–4	1–4	0–3	5–4	3–4	0–1	0 / 36	22–36	38%
ATP Tour Masters 1000
Indian Wells	Q1	1R	A	A	A	1R	A	1R	A	1R	2R	1R	2R	A	0 / 7	2–7	22%
Miami	A	A	A	A	A	2R	Q2	1R	2R	3R	1R	2R	1R	Q1	0 / 7	5–7	42%
Monte Carlo	A	Q1	A	1R	A	1R	A	2R	1R	1R	1R	A	1R	A	0 / 7	1–7	13%
Hamburg	A	A	Q3	A	A	1R	A	1R	1R	A	Q2	Q2	1R	A	0 / 4	0–4	0%
Rome	A	Q3	Q1	1R	3R	2R	1R	1R	1R	1R	1R	3R	1R	Q1	0 / 10	5–10	33%
Canada	A	A	A	A	A	A	A	A	1R	A	A	1R	3R	A	0 / 3	2–3	40%
Cincinnati	A	A	A	A	A	A	Q1	A	2R	Q1	A	Q1	2R	A	0 / 2	2–2	50%
Paris	A	A	A	A	A	A	A	Q1	1R	A	2R	1R	A	A	0 / 3	0–3	0%
Madrid	Not Held								A	A	1R	A	A	A	0 / 1	0–1	0%
Win–loss	0–0	0–1	0–0	0–2	2–1	2–5	0–1	1–5	2–7	2–4	1–6	3–5	4–7	0–0	0 / 44	17–44	28%

=== Doubles ===
Tournament	1995	1996	1997	1998	1999	2000	2001	2002	2003	2004	2005	2006	2007	SR	W–L	Win%
Grand Slam tournaments
Australian Open	A	A	A	A	A	A	A	A	1R	1R	A	1R	1R	0 / 4	0–4	0%
French Open	A	A	A	A	a	a	a	a	3R	A	1R	1R	A	0 / 3	2–3	40%
Wimbledon	A	Q1	A	A	A	A	A	A	A	Q1	1R	1R	A	0 / 2	0–2	0%
US Open	A	A	2R	A	A	A	A	A	A	A	1R	1R	A	0 / 3	1–3	25%
Win–loss	0–0	0–0	1–1	0–0	0–0	0–0	0–0	0–0	2–2	0–1	0–3	0–4	0–1	0 / 12	3–12	20%
ATP World Tour Masters 1000
Monte Carlo	A	A	A	A	Q1	A	1R	A	A	A	A	A	A	0 / 1	0–1	0%
Hamburg	A	Q2	A	A	QF	A	A	A	A	A	A	A	A	0 / 1	2–1	67%
Rome	Q1	A	1R	2R	1R	Q2	A	1R	A	A	A	A	A	0 / 4	1–4	20%
Win–loss	0–0	0–0	0–1	1–1	2–2	0–0	0–1	0–1	0–0	0–0	0–0	0–0	0–0	0 / 6	3–6	33%
