= Andrea Gaudenzi =

Italian tennis player

- Country (sports): Italy
- Born: 30 July 1973 (age 53) Faenza, Italy
- Height: 1.85 m (6 ft 1 in)
- Turned pro: 1990
- Retired: 2003
- Plays: Right-handed (two-handed backhand)
- Prize money: $3,063,479

Singles
- Career record: 219–231
- Career titles: 3
- Highest ranking: No. 18 (27 February 1995)

Grand Slam singles results
- Australian Open: 3R (1998)
- French Open: 4R (1994)
- Wimbledon: 2R (1996)
- US Open: 3R (1994)

Other tournaments
- Olympic Games: 3R (1996)

Doubles
- Career record: 86–113
- Career titles: 2
- Highest ranking: No. 59 (3 February 1997)

Grand Slam doubles results
- Australian Open: 1R (1996, 1997, 2001)
- US Open: 3R (1996)
- Last updated on: 9 January 2022.

Andrea Gaudenzi (Italian pronunciation: [anˈdrɛːa ɡauˈdɛntsi]; born 30 July 1973) is an Italian former tennis player and the current chairman of the Association of Tennis Professionals (ATP) since January 2020.

== Early life ==
Gaudenzi was born in Faenza, Italy, in the province of Ravenna. He grew up in a tennis family. His grandfather founded a tennis club, his uncle was the fifth highest ranked player in Italy and his father also played. Gaudenzi started playing tennis at age 3. Gaudenzi graduated in law from the University of Bologna and obtained an MBA with Honors at IUM.

== Tennis career ==
Gaudenzi turned professional in 1990 after becoming Junior World Champion by winning both the French Open and US Open junior titles. He reached a career high ATP singles ranking of world No. 18 in 1995. He has victories over Roger Federer in 2002 Rome, Pete Sampras in the 2002 French Open, Jim Courier in the 1994 US Open as well as Goran Ivanišević, Thomas Muster, Michael Stich and Yevgeny Kafelnikov. He represented Italy at the 1996 Summer Olympics in Atlanta, where he was defeated in the third round by the eventual champion Andre Agassi, and reached the Davis Cup Final in 1998, semifinals in 1995 and 1996, playing both singles and doubles. He won three ATP Tour titles and six finals, and he reached the semifinals in the Monte Carlo Master Series in 1995, losing to Thomas Muster.

== Post-playing career ==
Gaudenzi currently serves as Executive Chairman of the ATP Tour. He was first elected in January 2020 and in June 2023 was re-elected for a second term. Gaudenzi is a board member of ATP Media, the global sales, broadcast production and distribution arm of the ATP World Tour rights. Gaudenzi is also the non-executive Chairman of TDI, a joint venture between ATP and ATP Media, to manage and commercialise data across a variety of global markets. Previously he was Chief Revenues Officer at Musixmatch and was the co-founder and CMO at Soldo.

== Personal life ==
Gaudenzi is married with three sons.

== Career statistics ==
=== Junior Grand Slam finals ===
==== Singles: 2 (2 titles) ====
Result	Year	Championship	Surface	Opponent	Score
Win	1990	French Open	Clay	(Sweden) Thomas Enqvist	2–6, 7–6, 6–4
Win	1990	US Open	Hard	(Sweden) Mikael Tillström	6–2, 4–6, 7–6

=== ATP career finals ===
==== Singles: 9 (3 titles, 6 runner-ups) ====
Legend Grand Slam Tournaments (0–0) ATP World Tour Finals (0–0) ATP World Tour Masters Series (0–0) ATP Championship Series (0–1) ATP World Series (3–5)	Finals by surface Hard (0–1) Clay (3–5) Grass (0–0) Carpet (0–0)	Finals by setting Outdoors (3–6) Indoors (0–0)

Result	W–L	Date	Tournament	Tier	Surface	Opponent	Score
Loss	0–1	Jul 1994	Stuttgart, Germany	Championship Series	Clay	(Spain) Alberto Berasategui	5–7, 3–6, 6–7^{(5–7)}
Loss	0–2	Feb 1995	Dubai, United Arab Emirates	World Series	Hard	(South Africa) Wayne Ferreira	3–6, 3–6
Loss	0–3	Aug 1995	San Marino, San Marino	World Series	Clay	(Austria) Thomas Muster	2–6, 0–6
Loss	0–4	Apr 1996	Estoril, Portugal	World Series	Clay	(Austria) Thomas Muster	6–7^{(4–7)}, 4–6
Loss	0–5	Sep 1997	Bucharest, Romania	World Series	Clay	(Australia) Richard Fromberg	1–6, 6–7^{(2–7)}
Win	1–5	Mar 1998	Casablanca, Morocco	World Series	Clay	(Spain) Álex Calatrava	6–4, 5–7, 6–4
Loss	1–6	Jul 1998	Kitzbühel, Austria	World Series	Clay	(Spain) Albert Costa	2–6, 6–1, 2–6, 6–3, 1–6
Win	2–6	May 2001	St. Poelten, Austria	World Series	Clay	(Austria) Markus Hipfl	6–0, 7–5
Win	3–6	Jul 2001	Båstad, Sweden	World Series	Clay	(Czech Republic) Bohdan Ulihrach	7–5, 6–3

==== Doubles: 6 (2 titles, 4 runner-ups) ====
Legend Grand Slam Tournaments (0–0) ATP World Tour Finals (0–0) ATP World Tour Masters Series (0–0) ATP Championship Series (1–1) ATP World Series (1–3)	Finals by surface Hard (0–0) Clay (1–4) Grass (0–0) Carpet (1–0)	Finals by setting Outdoors (1–4) Indoors (1–0)

Result	W–L	Date	Tournament	Tier	Surface	Partner	Opponents	Score
Loss	0–1	Apr 1995	Barcelona, Spain	Championship Series	Clay	(Croatia) Goran Ivanišević	(United States) Trevor Kronemann (Australia) David Macpherson	2–6, 4–6
Win	1–1	Feb 1996	Milan, Italy	Championship Series	Carpet	(Croatia) Goran Ivanišević	(Switzerland) Jakob Hlasek (France) Guy Forget	6–4, 7–5
Loss	1–2	Apr 1997	Estoril, Portugal	World Series	Clay	(Italy) Filippo Messori	(Brazil) Gustavo Kuerten (Brazil) Fernando Meligeni	2–6, 2–6
Win	2–2	Mar 1998	Casablanca, Morocco	World Series	Clay	(Italy) Diego Nargiso	(Italy) Cristian Brandi (Italy) Filippo Messori	6–4, 7–6
Loss	2–3	May 2000	Sankt Pölten, Austria	World Series	Clay	(Italy) Diego Nargiso	(India) Mahesh Bhupathi (Australia) Andrew Kratzmann	6–7^{(10–12)}, 7–6^{(7–2)}, 4–6
Loss	2–4	Jul 2000	Båstad, Sweden	World Series	Clay	(Italy) Diego Nargiso	(Sweden) Nicklas Kulti (Sweden) Mikael Tillström	6–4, 2–6, 3–6

=== ATP Challenger and ITF Futures finals ===
==== Singles: 12 (9–3) ====
Legend ATP Challenger (9–3) ITF Futures (0–0)	Finals by surface Hard (0–0) Clay (9–3) Grass (0–0) Carpet (0–0)

Result	W–L	Date	Tournament	Tier	Surface	Opponent	Score
Win	1–0	Jan 1993	Bangalore, India	Challenger	Clay	(India) Srinivasan Vasudevan	6–1, 6–4
Win	2–0	Aug 1993	Poznań, Poland	Challenger	Clay	(Bulgaria) Milen Velev	6–3, 3–6, 6–3
Win	3–0	Apr 1994	Monte Carlo, Monaco	Challenger	Clay	(France) Gerard Solves	6–2, 6–1
Win	4–0	Sep 1995	Prostějov, Czech Republic	Challenger	Clay	(Czech Republic) Jiří Novák	6–4, 6–3
Loss	4–1	Jul 1997	Oberstaufen, Germany	Challenger	Clay	(Italy) Davide Sanguinetti	6–4, 6–7, 3–6
Loss	4–2	Jul 1997	Contrexéville, France	Challenger	Clay	(Spain) Julian Alonso	4–6, 3–6
Win	5–2	Aug 1997	Geneva, Switzerland	Challenger	Clay	(Spain) Alberto Martín	6–2, 6–1
Loss	5–3	Sep 1997	Edinburgh, United Kingdom	Challenger	Clay	(Romania) Dinu-Mihai Pescariu	6–4, 5–7, 1–6
Win	6–3	Jun 1999	Zagreb, Croatia	Challenger	Clay	(France) Julien Boutter	6–1, 6–4
Win	7–3	Apr 2000	Cagliari, Italy	Challenger	Clay	(Argentina) Martín Rodríguez	2–6, 7–5, 6–2
Win	8–3	Apr 2000	Maia, Portugal	Challenger	Clay	(Argentina) Juan Ignacio Chela	3–6, 7–5, 6–1
Win	9–3	Jun 2001	Braunschweig, Germany	Challenger	Clay	(Morocco) Younes El Aynaoui	3–6, 7–6^{(7–5)}, 6–4

==== Doubles: 5 (1–4) ====
Legend ATP Challenger (1–4) ITF Futures (0–0)	Finals by surface Hard (0–0) Clay (1–4) Grass (0–0) Carpet (0–0)

Result	W–L	Date	Tournament	Tier	Surface	Partner	Opponents	Score
Loss	0–1	Jul 1993	Ostend, Belgium	Challenger	Clay	(France) Jean-Philippe Fleurian	(Netherlands) Stephen Noteboom (United States) Jack Waite	7–6, 1–6, 4–6
Loss	0–2	Jul 1997	Oberstaufen, Germany	Challenger	Clay	(Austria) Georg Blumauer	(Spain) Juan Ignacio Carrasco (Spain) Jordi Mas-Rodriguez	2–6, 6–7
Loss	0–3	Apr 2000	Cagliari, Italy	Challenger	Clay	(Italy) Diego Nargiso	(Czech Republic) Tomáš Cibulec (Czech Republic) Leoš Friedl	1–6, 6–3, 5–7
Loss	0–4	Jul 2000	Venice, Italy	Challenger	Clay	(Italy) Diego Nargiso	(Spain) Julian Alonso (North Macedonia) Aleksandar Kitinov	6–7^{(3–7)}, 5–7
Win	1–4	Jun 2001	Prostějov, Czech Republic	Challenger	Clay	(Netherlands) Sander Groen	(United States) Devin Bowen (Argentina) Mariano Hood	7–6^{(8–6)}, 6–4

=== Performance timelines ===
Key
W	F	SF	QF	#R	RR	Q#	DNQ	A	NH

(W) winner; (F) finalist; (SF) semifinalist; (QF) quarterfinalist; (#R) rounds 4, 3, 2, 1; (RR) round-robin stage; (Q#) qualification round; (DNQ) did not qualify; (A) absent; (NH) not held; (SR) strike rate (events won / competed); (W–L) win–loss record.

==== Singles ====
Tournament	1993	1994	1995	1996	1997	1998	1999	2000	2001	2002	2003	SR	W–L	Win %
Grand Slam tournaments
Australian Open	Q1	2R	2R	1R	1R	3R	A	1R	1R	2R	1R	0 / 9	5–9	36%
French Open	Q2	4R	1R	2R	1R	2R	3R	2R	A	3R	Q2	0 / 8	10–8	56%
Wimbledon	A	1R	1R	2R	A	A	A	1R	A	1R	A	0 / 5	1–5	17%
US Open	A	3R	1R	2R	A	1R	1R	1R	2R	1R	A	0 / 8	4–8	33%
Win–loss	0–0	6–4	1–4	3–4	0–2	3–3	2–2	1–4	1–2	3–4	0–1	0 / 30	20–30	40%
Olympic Games
Summer Olympics	Not Held			3R	Not Held			A	Not Held			0 / 1	2–1	67%
ATP Tour Masters 1000
Indian Wells	A	2R	2R	2R	1R	1R	A	Q1	1R	1R	A	0 / 7	3–7	30%
Miami	A	A	A	2R	1R	A	A	Q1	A	2R	A	0 / 3	1–3	25%
Monte Carlo	A	3R	SF	1R	2R	3R	1R	1R	Q2	2R	Q1	0 / 8	10–8	56%
Hamburg	A	A	QF	A	A	1R	A	Q1	Q1	A	A	0 / 2	3–2	60%
Rome	2R	QF	2R	QF	1R	1R	3R	1R	Q2	2R	1R	0 / 10	11–10	52%
Canada	A	A	A	2R	A	A	A	A	A	A	A	0 / 1	1–1	50%
Cincinnati	A	1R	A	A	A	A	A	2R	A	A	A	0 / 2	1–2	33%
Paris	A	1R	2R	A	A	A	A	A	Q1	A	A	0 / 2	0–2	0%
Stuttgart	A	A	A	A	A	A	A	Q1	Q1	A	A	0 / 0	0–0	–
Win–loss	1–1	6–5	9–5	5–5	1–4	2–4	2–2	1–3	0–1	3–4	0–1	0 / 35	30–35	46%

==== Doubles ====
Tournament	1990	1991	1992	1993	1994	1995	1996	1997	1998	1999	2000	2001	2002	SR	W–L	Win %
Grand Slam tournaments
Australian Open	A	A	A	A	A	A	1R	1R	A	A	A	1R	A	0 / 3	0–3	0%
French Open	A	A	A	A	A	A	A	A	A	A	A	A	A	0 / 0	0–0	–
Wimbledon	A	A	A	A	A	A	A	A	A	A	A	A	A	0 / 0	0–0	–
US Open	A	A	A	A	A	A	3R	A	A	A	2R	1R	A	0 / 3	3–3	50%
Win–loss	0–0	0–0	0–0	0–0	0–0	0–0	2–2	0–1	0–0	0–0	1–1	0–2	0–0	0 / 6	3–6	33%
Olympic Games
Summer Olympics	NH		A	Not Held			1R	Not Held			A	Not Held		0 / 1	0–1	0%
ATP Tour Masters 1000
Indian Wells	A	A	A	A	A	A	2R	A	A	A	A	A	A	0 / 1	1–1	50%
Miami	A	A	A	A	A	A	1R	2R	A	A	A	A	A	0 / 2	1–2	33%
Monte Carlo	A	A	A	A	A	QF	2R	1R	1R	QF	1R	1R	A	0 / 7	5–7	42%
Hamburg	A	A	A	A	A	Q2	A	A	A	Q1	A	A	A	0 / 0	0–0	–
Rome	1R	A	A	Q2	1R	QF	2R	1R	A	A	2R	A	1R	0 / 7	4–7	36%
Canada	A	A	A	A	A	A	1R	A	A	A	A	A	A	0 / 1	0–1	0%
Cincinnati	A	A	A	A	A	A	A	A	A	A	1R	A	A	0 / 1	0–1	0%
Paris	A	A	A	A	A	1R	A	A	A	A	A	A	A	0 / 1	0–1	0%
Win–loss	0–1	0–0	0–0	0–0	0–1	4–3	3–5	1–3	0–1	2–1	1–3	0–1	0–1	0 / 20	11–20	35%
