= Van Lottum =

van Lottum is a Dutch surname. Notable people with the surname include:

- John van Lottum (born 1976), Dutch tennis player
- Noëlle van Lottum (born 1972), Dutch-born French tennis player
