= 2001 Monte Carlo Masters =

- Date: 16–22 April
- Edition: 95th
- Draw: 64S / 32D
- Prize money: $2,450,000
- Surface: Clay / outdoor
- Location: Roquebrune-Cap-Martin, France
- Venue: Monte Carlo Country Club

Champions

Singles
- (Brazil) Gustavo Kuerten

Doubles
- (Sweden) Jonas Björkman / (Australia) Todd Woodbridge
← 2000 ·	Monte Carlo Masters	· 2002 →

The 2001 Monte Carlo Masters was a men's tennis tournament played on outdoor clay courts. It was the 95th edition of the Monte Carlo Masters and was part of the Tennis Masters Series of the 2001 ATP Tour. It took place at the Monte Carlo Country Club in Roquebrune-Cap-Martin in France from 16 April through 22 April 2001.

The men's field was headlined by world No. 1 Marat Safin, Gustavo Kuerten and Magnus Norman. Other top seeds were Yevgeny Kafelnikov, Àlex Corretja, Arnaud Clément, Juan Carlos Ferrero and Tim Henman.

== Finals ==
=== Singles ===
(Brazil) Gustavo Kuerten defeated (Morocco) Hicham Arazi 6–3, 6–2, 6–4

- It was Kuerten's 4th title of the year and the 21st of his career. It was his 1st Masters title of the year and his 4th overall.

=== Doubles ===
(Sweden) Jonas Björkman / (Australia) Todd Woodbridge defeated (Australia) Joshua Eagle / (Australia) Andrew Florent 3–6, 6–4, 6–2

- It was Björkman's 3rd title of the year and the 28th of his career. It was Woodbridge's 2nd title of the year and the 71st of his career.
