= 2001 Monte Carlo Masters – Doubles =

Doubles
- 2001 Monte Carlo Masters

Final
- Champions: (Sweden) Jonas Björkman (Australia) Todd Woodbridge
- Runners-up: (Australia) Joshua Eagle (Australia) Andrew Florent
- Score: 3–6, 6–4, 6–2

Details
- Draw: 32 (6WC/2Q)
- Seeds: 8

Events
Singles	Doubles
← 2000 ·	Monte Carlo Masters	· 2002 →

Wayne Ferreira and Yevgeny Kafelnikov were the defending champions but lost in the first round to Scott Humphries and Andrei Olhovskiy.

Jonas Björkman and Todd Woodbridge won in the final 3–6, 6–4, 6–2 against Joshua Eagle and Andrew Florent.

== Seeds ==
1. (Sweden) Jonas Björkman / (Australia) Todd Woodbridge (champions)
2. (Czech Republic) Jiří Novák / (Czech Republic) David Rikl (quarterfinals)
3. (South Africa) Wayne Ferreira / (Russia) Yevgeny Kafelnikov (first round)
4. (Belarus) Max Mirnyi / (Germany) David Prinosil (first round)
5. (United States) Donald Johnson / (United States) Jared Palmer (quarterfinals)
6. (Australia) Joshua Eagle / (Australia) Andrew Florent (final)
7. (South Africa) David Adams / (Argentina) Martín García (quarterfinals)
8. (South Africa) John-Laffnie de Jager / (South Africa) Ellis Ferreira (first round)

== Draw ==
=== Key ===
- Q = Qualifier
- WC = Wild card
- LL = Lucky loser
- Alt = Alternate
- ITF = ITF entry
- PR = Protected ranking
- SR = Special ranking
- SE = Special exempt
- JE = Junior exempt
- JR = Junior Accelerator Programme entrant
- CO = College Accelerator Programme entrant
- NG = Next Gen Accelerator Program entrant
- w/o = Walkover
- r = Retired
- d = Defaulted

=== Finals ===
Semifinals
1	(Sweden) Jonas Björkman (Australia) Todd Woodbridge	6	6
(India) Mahesh Bhupathi (India) Leander Paes	3	2
6	(Australia) Joshua Eagle (Australia) Andrew Florent	7	3	7
(Brazil) Jaime Oncins (Argentina) Daniel Orsanic	5	6	5

Final
1	(Sweden) Jonas Björkman (Australia) Todd Woodbridge	3	6	6
6	(Australia) Joshua Eagle (Australia) Andrew Florent	6	4	2

=== Top half ===
First round
1	(Sweden) J Björkman (Australia) T Woodbridge	7^{7}	6
(United States) J Stark (Zimbabwe) K Ullyett	6^{4}	1
WC	(Morocco) H Arazi (Germany) N Kiefer	6^{6}	6	2
(Switzerland) R Federer (Slovakia) D Hrbatý	7^{8}	1	6
(Argentina) P Albano (Australia) D Macpherson	6	6
(Argentina) L Arnold (Spain) T Carbonell	4	2
(Sweden) S Aspelin (South Africa) M Wakefield	1	0
7	(South Africa) D Adams (Argentina) M García	6	6
4	(Belarus) M Mirnyi (Germany) D Prinosil	2	1
WC	(France) A Clément (France) S Grosjean	6	6
(Sweden) J Landsberg (Belgium) T Vanhoudt	5	0
(India) M Bhupathi (India) L Paes	7	6
(Netherlands) P Haarhuis (Netherlands) S Schalken	6	6
WC	(Spain) J Balcells (Spain) À Corretja	3	4
(The Bahamas) M Knowles (United States) B MacPhie	5	6	2
5	(United States) D Johnson (United States) J Palmer	7	4	6

Second round
1	(Sweden) J Björkman (Australia) T Woodbridge	6	7^{7}
(Switzerland) R Federer (Slovakia) D Hrbatý	2	6^{3}
(Argentina) P Albano (Australia) D Macpherson	6^{6}	7^{7}	4
7	(South Africa) D Adams (Argentina) M García	7^{8}	6^{5}	6
WC	(France) A Clément (France) S Grosjean	5	6	2
(India) M Bhupathi (India) L Paes	7	0	6
(Netherlands) P Haarhuis (Netherlands) S Schalken
5	(United States) D Johnson (United States) J Palmer	w/o

Quarterfinals
1	(Sweden) J Björkman (Australia) T Woodbridge	6	6
7	(South Africa) D Adams (Argentina) M García	3	4
(India) M Bhupathi (India) L Paes	1	7	7
5	(United States) D Johnson (United States) J Palmer	6	5	5

Semifinals
1	(Sweden) J Björkman (Australia) T Woodbridge	6	6
(India) M Bhupathi (India) L Paes	3	2

=== Bottom half ===
First round
6	(Australia) J Eagle (Australia) A Florent	6	3	6
Q	(Spain) Á López Morón (Spain) A Martín	3	6	3
WC	(United Kingdom) T Henman (Sweden) M Norman	6^{3}	6	6
(Czech Republic) T Cibulec (Czech Republic) L Friedl	7^{7}	1	2
Q	(North Macedonia) A Kitinov (South Africa) R Koenig	4	4
(Czech Republic) P Pála (Czech Republic) P Vízner	6	6
(United States) S Humphries (Russia) A Olhovskiy	7	6
3	(South Africa) W Ferreira (Russia) Y Kafelnikov	5	3
8	(South Africa) J-L de Jager (South Africa) E Ferreira	6^{5}	7^{7}	6^{8}
(Australia) M Hill (United States) J Tarango	7^{7}	6^{4}	7^{10}
(Brazil) J Oncins (Argentina) D Orsanic	6	6
(Australia) A Kratzmann (Federal Republic of Yugoslavia) N Zimonjić	3	3
(South Africa) M Barnard (Czech Republic) C Suk	6^{7}	6	6
WC	(France) J Boutter (France) F Santoro	7^{9}	4	4
WC	(Italy) A Gaudenzi (Italy) D Sanguinetti	2	2
2	(Czech Republic) J Novák (Czech Republic) D Rikl	6	6

Second round
6	(Australia) J Eagle (Australia) A Florent	4	7	6
WC	(United Kingdom) T Henman (Sweden) M Norman	6	5	3
(Czech Republic) P Pála (Czech Republic) P Vízner	6	6
(United States) S Humphries (Russia) A Olhovskiy	4	2
(Australia) M Hill (United States) J Tarango	4	6	4
(Brazil) J Oncins (Argentina) D Orsanic	6	1	6
(South Africa) M Barnard (Czech Republic) C Suk	4	1
2	(Czech Republic) J Novák (Czech Republic) D Rikl	6	6

Quarterfinals
6	(Australia) J Eagle (Australia) A Florent	7^{7}	3	6
(Czech Republic) P Pála (Czech Republic) P Vízner	6^{5}	6	1
(Brazil) J Oncins (Argentina) D Orsanic	6	6
2	(Czech Republic) J Novák (Czech Republic) D Rikl	2	4

Semifinals
6	(Australia) J Eagle (Australia) A Florent	7	3	7
(Brazil) J Oncins (Argentina) D Orsanic	5	6	5

== Qualifying ==
=== Qualifying seeds ===
1. (Argentina) Mariano Hood / (Argentina) Sebastián Prieto (qualifying competition)
2. (Spain) Álex López Morón / (Spain) Alberto Martín (qualified)
3. (North Macedonia) Aleksandar Kitinov / (South Africa) Robbie Koenig (qualified)
4. (Netherlands) Sander Groen / (Netherlands) Jan Siemerink (qualifying competition)

=== Qualifiers ===
1. (North Macedonia) Aleksandar Kitinov / (South Africa) Robbie Koenig
2. (Spain) Álex López Morón / (Spain) Alberto Martín

=== Qualifying draw ===
==== First qualifier ====
First round
1	(Argentina) Mariano Hood (Argentina) Sebastián Prieto	6	7^{8}
(United States) Devin Bowen (Israel) Harel Levy	3	6^{6}
WC	(Sweden) Thomas Enqvist (Sweden) Thomas Johansson	4	7^{7}	2
3	(North Macedonia) Aleksandar Kitinov (South Africa) Robbie Koenig	6	6^{5}	6

Qualifying competition
1	(Argentina) Mariano Hood (Argentina) Sebastián Prieto	2	6	3
3	(North Macedonia) Aleksandar Kitinov (South Africa) Robbie Koenig	6	3	6

==== Second qualifier ====
First round
2	(Spain) Álex López Morón (Spain) Alberto Martín	6	4	6
WC	(Croatia) Ivan Ljubičić (Germany) Rainer Schüttler	3	6	3
WC	(Monaco) Christophe Bosio (Monaco) Emanuele Huesner	6^{7}	6	6^{1}
4	(Netherlands) Sander Groen (Netherlands) Jan Siemerink	7^{9}	3	7^{7}

Qualifying competition
2	(Spain) Álex López Morón (Spain) Alberto Martín	6	3	6
4	(Netherlands) Sander Groen (Netherlands) Jan Siemerink	2	6	2
