= 2000 Monte Carlo Masters =

- Date: 17–23 April
- Edition: 94th
- Category: ATP Masters Series
- Draw: 64S / 32D
- Prize money: $2,450,000
- Surface: Clay / outdoor
- Location: Roquebrune-Cap-Martin, France
- Venue: Monte Carlo Country Club

Champions

Singles
- (France) Cédric Pioline

Doubles
- (South Africa) Wayne Ferreira / (Russia) Yevgeny Kafelnikov
← 1999 ·	Monte Carlo Masters	· 2001 →

The 2000 Monte Carlo Masters was a men's tennis tournament played on outdoor clay courts. It was the 94th edition of the Monte Carlo Masters, and was part of the ATP Masters Series of the 2000 ATP Tour. It took place at the Monte Carlo Country Club in Roquebrune-Cap-Martin, France, near Monte Carlo, Monaco, from 17 April through 23 April 2000.

The men's field was headlined by ATP No. 4, Australian Open runner-up, 1999 Stuttgart, Montreal titlist Yevgeny Kafelnikov, Santiago winner, Miami finalist, Monte Carlo defending champion Gustavo Kuerten and Auckland winner Magnus Norman. Other top seeds in the field were Lyon titlist Nicolás Lapentti, 1997 Monte Carlo champion Marcelo Ríos, Thomas Enqvist, Tim Henman and Cédric Pioline.

== Finals ==
=== Singles ===
(France) Cédric Pioline defeated (Slovakia) Dominik Hrbatý, 6–4, 7–6, 7–6

- It was Cédric Pioline's 2nd title of the year, and his 5th overall. It was his 1st Masters title of the year, and overall.

=== Doubles ===
(South Africa) Wayne Ferreira / (Russia) Yevgeny Kafelnikov defeated (Netherlands) Paul Haarhuis / (Australia) Sandon Stolle, 6–3, 2–6, 6–1
