= 1999 Monte Carlo Open – Doubles =

Doubles
- 1999 Monte Carlo Open

Final
- Champion: (France) Olivier Delaître (United Kingdom) Tim Henman
- Runner-up: (Czech Republic) Jiří Novák (Czech Republic) David Rikl
- Score: 6–2, 6–3

Events
Singles	Doubles
← 1998 ·	Monte Carlo Open	· 2000 →

Jacco Eltingh and Paul Haarhuis were the defending champions. Eltingh chose not to participate. Haarhuis teamed up with Jared Palmer, but they lost in the first round to Andrea Gaudenzi and Diego Nargiso.

Olivier Delaître and Tim Henman won the title, by defeating Jiří Novák and David Rikl 6–2, 6–3 in the final.

== Seeds ==
Champion seeds are indicated in bold text while text in italics indicates the round in which those seeds were eliminated.

1. (India) Mahesh Bhupathi / (India) Leander Paes (second round)
2. (Sweden) Jonas Björkman / (The Bahamas) Mark Knowles (quarterfinals)
3. (South Africa) Ellis Ferreira / (United States) Rick Leach (second round)
4. (Russia) Yevgeny Kafelnikov / (Australia) Mark Woodforde (second round)
5. (South Africa) David Adams / (South Africa) John-Laffnie de Jager (first round)
6. (Netherlands) Paul Haarhuis / (United States) Jared Palmer (first round)
7. (United States) Donald Johnson / (Czech Republic) Cyril Suk (semifinals)
8. (Czech Republic) Jiří Novák / (Czech Republic) David Rikl (final)

== Draw ==
=== Key ===
- Q = Qualifier
- WC = Wild card
- LL = Lucky loser
- Alt = Alternate
- SE = Special exempt
- PR = Protected ranking
- ITF = ITF entry
- JE = Junior exempt
- w/o = Walkover
- r = Retired
- d = Defaulted
- SR = Special ranking

=== Finals ===
Semifinals
7	(United States) Donald Johnson (Czech Republic) Cyril Suk	4	5
(France) **Olivier Delaître** **(United Kingdom) Tim Henman**	**6**	**7**
(Australia) Wayne Arthurs (Australia) Andrew Kratzmann	4	5
8	(Czech Republic) **Jiří Novák** **(Czech Republic) David Rikl**	**6**	**7**

Final
(France) **Olivier Delaître** **(United Kingdom) Tim Henman**	**6**	**6**
8	(Czech Republic) Jiří Novák (Czech Republic) David Rikl	2	3

=== Top half ===
First round
(Slovakia) **D Hrbatý** **(Slovakia) K Kučera**	3	**6**	**6**
(Brazil) F Meligeni (Argentina) S Prieto	**6**	3	1
(Germany) **M-K Goellner** **(North Macedonia) A Kitinov**	**6**	**6**
(Argentina) D Orsanic (Argentina) M Puerta	4	2
7	(United States) **D Johnson** **(Czech Republic) C Suk**	**6**	**6**
(Australia) D Macpherson (Australia) P Tramacchi	2	4
(France) **O Delaître** **(United Kingdom) T Henman**	**6**	**6**
(France) A Clément (France) J Golmard	4	2
(Argentina) **L Lobo** **(Chile) M Ríos**	2	**6**	**6**
(Australia) J Eagle (Australia) A Florent	**6**	2	1
(Italy) **A Gaudenzi** **(Italy) D Nargiso**	**6**	**6**
6	(Netherlands) P Haarhuis (United States) J Palmer	2	3

Second round
1	(India) M Bhupathi (India) L Paes	3	2
(Slovakia) **D Hrbatý** **(Slovakia) K Kučera**	**6**	**6**
(Germany) M-K Goellner (North Macedonia) A Kitinov	3	2
7	(United States) **D Johnson** **(Czech Republic) C Suk**	**6**	**6**
4	(Russia) Y Kafelnikov (Australia) M Woodforde	6	6
(France) **O Delaître** **(United Kingdom) T Henman**	**7**	**7**
(Argentina) L Lobo (Chile) M Ríos
(Italy) **A Gaudenzi** **(Italy) D Nargiso**	w/o

Quarterfinals
(Slovakia) D Hrbatý (Slovakia) K Kučera	3	2
7	(United States) **D Johnson** **(Czech Republic) C Suk**	**6**	**6**
(France) **O Delaître** **(United Kingdom) T Henman**	**7**	**6**
(Italy) A Gaudenzi (Italy) D Nargiso	6	3

Semifinals
7	(United States) D Johnson (Czech Republic) C Suk	4	5
(France) **O Delaître** **(United Kingdom) T Henman**	**6**	**7**

=== Bottom half ===
First round
(Australia) **W Arthurs** **(Australia) A Kratzmann**	**6**	6	**6**
5	(South Africa) D Adams (South Africa) J-L de Jager	3	**7**	4
(South Africa) **C Haggard** **(United States) F Montana**	**6**	2	**6**
(Sweden) P Nyborg (Russia) A Olhovskiy	3	**6**	1
(United States) **J Tarango** **(Czech Republic) D Vacek**	4	**7**	**6**
(Czech Republic) M Damm (Czech Republic) P Vízner	**6**	5	4
8	(Czech Republic) **J Novák** **(Czech Republic) D Rikl**	**6**	**7**
(Spain) A Berasategui (Spain) F Roig	2	5
(South Africa) **P Norval** **(Zimbabwe) K Ullyett**	**6**	**6**
(United Kingdom) N Broad (South Africa) R Koenig	4	3
(Brazil) **G Kuerten** **(Ecuador) N Lapentti**	**6**	**7**
(Argentina) P Albano (Spain) J Sánchez	3	6

Second round
(Australia) **W Arthurs** **(Australia) A Kratzmann**	**6**	**6**
(South Africa) C Haggard (United States) F Montana	3	4
(United States) **J Tarango** **(Czech Republic) D Vacek**	**6**	**6**
3	(South Africa) E Ferreira (United States) R Leach	4	2
8	(Czech Republic) **J Novák** **(Czech Republic) D Rikl**	**6**	3	**6**
(South Africa) P Norval (Zimbabwe) K Ullyett	2	**6**	3
(Brazil) G Kuerten (Ecuador) N Lapentti	2	3
2	(Sweden) **Jonas Björkman** **(The Bahamas) Mark Knowles**	**6**	**6**

Quarterfinals
(Australia) **W Arthurs** **(Australia) A Kratzmann**	3	**6**	**6**
(United States) J Tarango (Czech Republic) D Vacek	**6**	4	2
8	(Czech Republic) **J Novák** **(Czech Republic) D Rikl**	**6**	**6**
2	(Sweden) Jonas Björkman (The Bahamas) Mark Knowles	2	2

Semifinals
(Australia) W Arthurs (Australia) A Kratzmann	4	5
8	(Czech Republic) **J Novák** **(Czech Republic) D Rikl**	**6**	**7**
