= 2000 Monte Carlo Masters – Singles =

Singles
- 2000 Monte Carlo Masters

Final
- Champion: (France) Cédric Pioline
- Runner-up: (Slovakia) Dominik Hrbatý
- Score: 6–4, 7–6^{(7–3)}, 7–6^{(8–6)}

Details
- Draw: 64 (8 Q / 4 WC )
- Seeds: 16

Events
| Singles | Doubles |
| ← 1999 · | Monte Carlo Masters | · 2001 → |

Cédric Pioline defeated Dominik Hrbatý in the final, 6–4, 7–6^{(7–3)}, 7–6^{(8–6)} to win the singles tennis title at the 2000 Monte Carlo Masters.

Gustavo Kuerten was the defending champion, but lost in the first round to Karol Kučera.

== Seeds ==
1. (Russia) Yevgeny Kafelnikov (second round)
2. (Brazil) Gustavo Kuerten (first round)
3. (Sweden) Magnus Norman (second round)
4. (Ecuador) Nicolás Lapentti (first round)
5. (Chile) Marcelo Ríos (first round)
6. (Sweden) Thomas Enqvist (second round)
7. (United Kingdom) Tim Henman (second round)
8. (France) Cédric Pioline (champion)
9. (Spain) Álex Corretja (quarterfinals)
10. (United Kingdom) Greg Rusedski (first round)
11. (Morocco) Younes El Aynaoui (first round, retired)
12. (Spain) Albert Costa (quarterfinals)
13. (Germany) Tommy Haas (first round)
14. (Australia) Mark Philippoussis (first round)
15. (Argentina) Mariano Zabaleta (second round)
16. (Austria) Stefan Koubek (first round)

== Draw ==
=== Key ===
- Q = Qualifier
- WC = Wild card
- LL = Lucky loser
- Alt = Alternate
- SE = Special exempt
- PR = Protected ranking
- ITF = ITF entry
- JE = Junior exempt
- w/o = Walkover
- r = Retired
- d = Defaulted
- SR = Special ranking

=== Finals ===
Quarterfinals
(Slovakia) Dominik Hrbatý | 3 | 6 | 6
9 | (Spain) Àlex Corretja | 6 | 3 | 4
(Spain) Juan Carlos Ferrero | 4 | 2
(Argentina) Gastón Gaudio | 6 | 6
12 | (Spain) Albert Costa | 4 | 5
(Morocco) Karim Alami | 6 | 7
8 | (France) Cédric Pioline | 6 | 6
(Slovakia) Karol Kučera | 2 | 4

Semifinals
(Slovakia) Dominik Hrbatý | 4 | 7 | 6
(Argentina) Gastón Gaudio | 6 | 5 | 2
(Morocco) Karim Alami | 3 | 1
8 | (France) Cédric Pioline | 6 | 6

Final
(Slovakia) Dominik Hrbatý | 4 | 6^{3} | 6^{6}
8 | (France) Cédric Pioline | 6 | 7^{7} | 7^{8}

=== Top half ===
==== Section 1 ====
First round
1 | (Russia) Y Kafelnikov | 6 | 6
(Czech Republic) D Vacek | 3 | 3
(Slovakia) D Hrbatý | 6 | 7
(France) A di Pasquale | 2 | 5
(France) A Clément | 6 | 6^{6} | 6
WC | (Croatia) G Ivanišević | 0 | 7^{8} | 4
(United States) V Spadea | 2 | 6 | 5
15 | (Argentina) M Zabaleta | 6 | 1 | 7
9 | (Spain) Á Corretja | 7^{7} | 6
Q | (Spain) A Berasategui | 6^{5} | 1
Q | (Bulgaria) O Stanoytchev | 4 | 2
(France) F Santoro | 6 | 6
Q | (Spain) Á López Morón | 5 | 6 | 6^{5}
Q | (Argentina) J I Chela | 7 | 1 | 7^{7}
(Switzerland) M Rosset | 3 | 2
7 | (United Kingdom) T Henman | 6 | 6

Second round
1 | (Russia) Y Kafelnikov | 3 | 7 | 4
(Slovakia) D Hrbatý | 6 | 5 | 6
(France) A Clément | 6^{3} | 6 | 7
15 | (Argentina) M Zabaleta | 7^{7} | 0 | 5
9 | (Spain) Á Corretja | 6 | 6
(France) F Santoro | 0 | 4
Q | (Argentina) J I Chela | 6 | 4 | 6
7 | (United Kingdom) T Henman | 2 | 6 | 3

Third round
(Slovakia) D Hrbatý | 6 | 7
(France) A Clément | 4 | 5
9 | (Spain) Á Corretja | 6 | 6
Q | (Argentina) J I Chela | 3 | 3

Quarterfinals
(Slovakia) D Hrbatý | 3 | 6 | 6
9 | (Spain) Á Corretja | 6 | 3 | 4

==== Section 2 ====
First round
4 | (Ecuador) N Lapentti | 2 | 6^{5}
(Argentina) F Squillari | 6 | 7^{7}
WC | (Italy) A Gaudenzi | 6^{2} | 4
(Brazil) F Meligeni | 7^{7} | 6
(Spain) J C Ferrero | 6 | 6
(Spain) F Clavet | 2 | 4
(Morocco) H Arazi | 3 | 6 | 6
13 | (Germany) T Haas | 6 | 1 | 1
11 | (Morocco) Y El Aynaoui | 6^{1} | 2^{r}
(Armenia) S Sargsian | 7^{7} | 4
Q | (France) J Boutter | 6 | 6
(United States) M Chang | 2 | 4
(Russia) M Safin | 6^{5} | 0
(Argentina) G Gaudio | 7^{7} | 6
(Spain) F Mantilla | 6 | 0 | 6
5 | (Chile) M Ríos | 4 | 6 | 2

Second round
(Argentina) F Squillari | 6 | 6
(Brazil) F Meligeni | 2 | 4
(Spain) J C Ferrero | 6 | 6
(Morocco) H Arazi | 0 | 3
(Armenia) S Sargsian | 2 | 3
Q | (France) J Boutter | 6 | 6
(Argentina) G Gaudio | 6 | 7
(Spain) F Mantilla | 3 | 5

Third round
(Argentina) F Squillari | 2 | 4
(Spain) J C Ferrero | 6 | 6
Q | (France) J Boutter | 3 | 5
(Argentina) G Gaudio | 6 | 7

Quarterfinals
(Spain) J C Ferrero | 4 | 2
(Argentina) G Gaudio | 6 | 6

=== Bottom half ===
==== Section 3 ====
First round
6 | (Sweden) T Enqvist | 6 | 6
WC | (France) C Saulnier | 3 | 2
(Spain) F Vicente | 5 | 1
(Netherlands) R Krajicek | 7 | 6
(France) J Golmard | 6 | 6
(United States) C Woodruff | 4 | 2
(Germany) R Schüttler | 4 | 4
12 | (Spain) A Costa | 6 | 6
14 | (Australia) M Philippoussis | 4 | 5
(South Africa) W Ferreira | 6 | 7
Q | (Norway) C Ruud | 4 | 7 | 6
(Sweden) A Vinciguerra | 6 | 5 | 1
(Sweden) T Johansson | 3 | 2
(Morocco) K Alami | 6 | 6
Q | (Spain) A Portas | 6 | 3 | 4
3 | (Sweden) M Norman | 3 | 6 | 6

Second round
6 | (Sweden) T Enqvist | 5 | 1
(Netherlands) R Krajicek | 7 | 6
(France) J Golmard | 6 | 4 | 2
12 | (Spain) A Costa | 2 | 6 | 6
(South Africa) W Ferreira | 7 | 4 | 3
Q | (Norway) C Ruud | 5 | 6 | 6
(Morocco) K Alami | 6 | 3 | 6
3 | (Sweden) M Norman | 3 | 6 | 1

Third round
(Netherlands) R Krajicek | 6^{3} | 3
12 | (Spain) A Costa | 7^{7} | 6
Q | (Norway) C Ruud | 6 | 1 | 6^{2}
(Morocco) K Alami | 2 | 6 | 7^{7}

Quarterfinals
12 | (Spain) A Costa | 4 | 5
(Morocco) K Alami | 6 | 7

==== Section 4 ====
First round
8 | (France) C Pioline | 6 | 6
(Sweden) M Larsson | 2 | 2
(Czech Republic) J Novák | 6 | 2 | 7
(Switzerland) R Federer | 1 | 6 | 5
(France) N Escudé | 4 | 6 | 6
Q | (France) S Huet | 6 | 1 | 2
(Czech Republic) S Doseděl | 6 | 6^{3} | 6
10 | (United Kingdom) G Rusedski | 4 | 7^{7} | 1
16 | (Austria) S Koubek | 6 | 3 | 0
(Spain) C Moyà | 1 | 6 | 6
WC | (Sweden) J Björkman | 4 | 2
(Netherlands) S Schalken | 6 | 6
(Ukraine) A Medvedev | 2 | 6 | 6
(France) S Grosjean | 6 | 0 | 3
(Slovakia) K Kučera | 6 | 0 | 6
2 | (Brazil) G Kuerten | 4 | 6 | 2

Second round
8 | (France) C Pioline | 6 | 6
(Czech Republic) J Novák | 4 | 3
(France) N Escudé | 0 | 3
(Czech Republic) S Doseděl | 6 | 6
(Spain) C Moyà | 4 | 6 | 1
(Netherlands) S Schalken | 6 | 4 | 6
(Ukraine) A Medvedev | 6^{1} | 4
(Slovakia) K Kučera | 7^{7} | 6

Third round
8 | (France) C Pioline | 3 | 7 | 6
(Czech Republic) S Doseděl | 6 | 5 | 4
(Netherlands) S Schalken | 2 | 4
(Slovakia) K Kučera | 6 | 6

Quarterfinals
8 | (France) C Pioline | 6 | 6
(Slovakia) K Kučera | 2 | 4

== Qualifying ==
=== Qualifying seeds ===
1. (Belarus) Max Mirnyi (qualifying competition)
2. (Spain) Alberto Berasategui (qualified)
3. (Romania) Andrei Pavel (qualifying competition)
4. (Sweden) Mikael Tillström (qualifying competition)
5. (Spain) Alberto Martín (qualifying competition)
6. (Croatia) Ivan Ljubičić (first round)
7. (Argentina) Hernán Gumy (first round)
8. (Switzerland) George Bastl (first round)
9. (Spain) Albert Portas (qualified)
10. (Costa Rica) Juan Antonio Marín (qualifying competition)
11. (Sweden) Magnus Gustafsson (qualifying competition)
12. (Romania) Adrian Voinea (first round)
13. (Argentina) Juan Ignacio Chela (qualified)
14. (Belgium) Christophe Rochus (first round)
15. (Austria) Markus Hipfl (qualifying competition)
16. (Norway) Christian Ruud (qualified)

=== Qualifiers ===
1. (Norway) Christian Ruud
2. (Spain) Alberto Berasategui
3. (Argentina) Juan Ignacio Chela
4. (France) Stéphane Huet
5. (France) Julien Boutter
6. (Spain) Álex López Morón
7. (Spain) Albert Portas
8. (Bulgaria) Orlin Stanoytchev

=== Qualifying draw ===
==== First qualifier ====
First round
1 | (Belarus) Max Mirnyi | 4 | 6 | 6
(Russia) Andrei Stoliarov | 6 | 4 | 3
(Netherlands) Jan Siemerink | 3 | 7^{7} | 4
16 | (Norway) Christian Ruud | 6 | 6^{5} | 6

Qualifying competition
1 | (Belarus) Max Mirnyi | 6 | 0 | 5
16 | (Norway) Christian Ruud | 4 | 6 | 7

==== Second qualifier ====
First round
2 | (Spain) Alberto Berasategui | 6 | 6
(Netherlands) John van Lottum | 3 | 2
(Switzerland) Lorenzo Manta | 2 | 2
15 | (Austria) Markus Hipfl | 6 | 6

Qualifying competition
2 | (Spain) Alberto Berasategui | 6 | 6
15 | (Austria) Markus Hipfl | 3 | 4

==== Third qualifier ====
First round
3 | (Romania) Andrei Pavel | 3 | 6 | 7^{7}
WC | (France) Michaël Llodra | 6 | 1 | 6^{5}
(France) Thierry Guardiola | 1^{r}
13 | (Argentina) Juan Ignacio Chela | 5

Qualifying competition
3 | (Romania) Andrei Pavel | 7^{7} | 3 | 3
13 | (Argentina) Juan Ignacio Chela | 6^{5} | 6 | 6

==== Fourth qualifier ====
First round
4 | (Sweden) Mikael Tillström | 6 | 6
(France) Antony Dupuis | 3 | 4
(France) Stéphane Huet | 6 | 7^{7}
14 | (Belgium) Christophe Rochus | 2 | 6^{4}

Qualifying competition
4 | (Sweden) Mikael Tillström | 4 | 6 | 2
(France) Stéphane Huet | 6 | 3 | 6

==== Fifth qualifier ====
First round
5 | (Spain) Alberto Martín | 6 | 6
(Spain) Germán Puentes | 4 | 2
WC | (France) Julien Boutter | 3 | 6 | 7
12 | (Romania) Adrian Voinea | 6 | 3 | 5

Qualifying competition
5 | (Spain) Alberto Martín | 3 | 6 | 1
WC | (France) Julien Boutter | 6 | 3 | 6

==== Sixth qualifier ====
First round
6 | (Croatia) Ivan Ljubičić | 7^{7} | 5 | 6^{7}
(Spain) Álex López Morón | 6^{2} | 7 | 7^{9}
(Argentina) Martín Rodríguez | 3 | 6 | 5
11 | (Sweden) Magnus Gustafsson | 6 | 3 | 7

Qualifying competition
(Spain) Álex López Morón | 6 | 6^{1} | 7^{7}
11 | (Sweden) Magnus Gustafsson | 1 | 7^{7} | 6^{4}

==== Seventh qualifier ====
First round
7 | (Argentina) Hernán Gumy | 6^{3} | 1
WC | (France) Paul-Henri Mathieu | 7^{7} | 6
(Australia) Wayne Arthurs | 2 | 4
9 | (Spain) Albert Portas | 6 | 6

Qualifying competition
WC | (France) Paul-Henri Mathieu | 5 | 2
9 | (Spain) Albert Portas | 7 | 6

==== Eighth qualifier ====
First round
8 | (Switzerland) George Bastl | 3 | 3
(Bulgaria) Orlin Stanoytchev | 6 | 6
WC | (Italy) Renzo Furlan | 6^{6} | 4
10 | (Costa Rica) Juan Antonio Marín | 7^{8} | 6

Qualifying competition
(Bulgaria) Orlin Stanoytchev | 6 | 6
10 | (Costa Rica) Juan Antonio Marín | 3 | 4
