= 1999 Monte Carlo Open – Singles =

Singles
- 1999 Monte Carlo Open

Final
- Champion: (Brazil) Gustavo Kuerten
- Runner-up: (Chile) Marcelo Ríos
- Score: 6–4, 2–1, retired

Details
- Draw: 56 (7Q / 5WC)
- Seeds: 16

Events
Singles	Doubles
← 1998 ·	Monte Carlo Open	· 2000 →

Gustavo Kuerten won the singles tennis title at the 1999 Monte Carlo Open when Marcelo Ríos retired from the final with the scoreline at 6–4, 2–1.

Carlos Moyá was the defending champion, but lost in the quarterfinals to Jérôme Golmard.

== Seeds ==
The top eight seeds received a bye to the second round.

1. (Spain) Carlos Moyá (quarterfinals)
2. (Russia) Yevgeny Kafelnikov (second round)
3. (United Kingdom) Tim Henman (second round)
4. (United States) ~~Todd Martin~~ (withdrew)
5. (Australia) Mark Philippoussis (quarterfinals)
6. (Slovakia) Karol Kučera (second round)
7. (United States) ~~Andre Agassi~~ (withdrew)
8. (United Kingdom) Greg Rusedski (second round)
9. (Chile) Marcelo Ríos (final, retired)
10. (Spain) Álbert Costa (quarterfinals)
11. (Croatia) Goran Ivanišević (first round)
12. (Sweden) Thomas Enqvist (second round)
13. (Brazil) Gustavo Kuerten (champion)
14. (Germany) Tommy Haas (second round)
15. (Spain) Félix Mantilla (semifinals)
16. (Sweden) Thomas Johansson (first round)

== Draw ==
=== Key ===
- Q = Qualifier
- WC = Wild card
- LL = Lucky loser
- Alt = Alternate
- SE = Special exempt
- PR = Protected ranking
- ITF = ITF entry
- JE = Junior exempt
- w/o = Walkover
- r = Retired
- d = Defaulted
- SR = Special ranking

=== Finals ===
Semifinals
(France) Jérôme Golmard	4	6	2
9	(Chile) Marcelo Ríos	6	3	6
13	(Brazil) Gustavo Kuerten	3	6	6
15	(Spain) Félix Mantilla	6	3	4

Final
9	(Chile) Marcelo Ríos	4	1^{r}
13	(Brazil) Gustavo Kuerten	6	2

=== Top half ===
==== Section 1 ====
First round
(Czech Republic) S Doseděl	2	1
LL	(Romania) D Pescariu	6	6
SE	(Morocco) K Alami	6	6
LL	(Netherlands) S Schalken	2	3
(Austria) T Muster	6	6
16	(Sweden) T Johansson	3	4
(France) C Pioline	4	7	4
WC	(Germany) B Becker	6	5	6
(France) J Golmard	6	6
(Italy) D Sanguinetti	1	2
WC	(France) A Di Pasquale	7^{7}	5	6
(Spain) A Berasategui	6^{4}	7	4

Second round
1	(Spain) C Moyà	3	6	6
LL	(Romania) D Pescariu	6	3	4
SE	(Morocco) K Alami	6	6
(Austria) T Muster	3	3
WC	(Germany) B Becker
(France) J Golmard	w/o
WC	(France) A Di Pasquale	6	7^{7}
LL	(Italy) V Santopadre	3	6^{4}

Third round
1	(Spain) C Moyà	6	6
SE	(Morocco) K Alami	4	1
(France) J Golmard	6	6
WC	(France) A Di Pasquale	1	4

Quarterfinals
1	(Spain) C Moyà	7^{7}	3	0
(France) J Golmard	6^{5}	6	6

==== Section 2 ====
First round
(Sweden) J Björkman	6^{5}	6	4
(Paraguay) R Delgado	7^{7}	0	6
Q	(Argentina) S Prieto	0	4
WC	(France) S Grosjean	6	6
(Russia) M Safin	4	2
14	(Germany) T Haas	6	6
11	(Croatia) G Ivanišević	1	4
(Morocco) H Arazi	6	6
Q	(France) A Clément	4	2
(Argentina) M Puerta	6	6
(Romania) A Pavel	6	7
(Morocco) Y El Aynaoui	4	5

Second round
5	(Australia) M Philippoussis	7^{7}	6
(Paraguay) R Delgado	6^{4}	4
WC	(France) S Grosjean	7	6
14	(Germany) T Haas	5	2
(Morocco) H Arazi	6	6
(Argentina) M Puerta	1	4
(Romania) A Pavel	6	4	6^{6}
9	(Chile) M Ríos	0	6	7^{8}

Third round
5	(Australia) M Philippoussis	4	7^{7}	6
WC	(France) S Grosjean	6	6^{5}	2
(Morocco) H Arazi	3	3
9	(Chile) M Ríos	6	6

Quarterfinals
5	(Australia) M Philippoussis	2	7^{7}	4
9	(Chile) M Ríos	6	6^{2}	6

=== Bottom half ===
==== Section 3 ====
First round
WC	(Switzerland) R Federer	6^{3}	0
(United States) V Spadea	7^{7}	6
(Spain) F Clavet	6	6
(Czech Republic) D Vacek	1	0
(Slovakia) D Hrbatý	5	7^{7}	2
12	(Sweden) T Enqvist	7	6^{4}	6
13	(Brazil) G Kuerten	6	6
Q	(Brazil) M Carlsson	1	3
(Czech Republic) B Ulihrach	6	6
(Spain) F Vicente	2	2
(Brazil) F Meligeni	6	5	6
(Australia) A Ilie	4	7	2

Second round
6	(Slovakia) K Kučera	4	3
(United States) V Spadea	6	6
(Spain) F Clavet	6	6
12	(Sweden) T Enqvist	2	0
13	(Brazil) G Kuerten	6^{5}	6	6
(Czech Republic) B Ulihrach	7^{7}	2	4
(Brazil) F Meligeni	6^{5}	6	7
3	(United Kingdom) T Henman	7^{7}	4	5

Third round
(United States) V Spadea	6	2	6
(Spain) F Clavet	3	6	3
13	(Brazil) G Kuerten	6	7^{7}
(Brazil) F Meligeni	2	6^{2}

Quarterfinals
(United States) V Spadea	3	3
13	(Brazil) G Kuerten	6	6

==== Section 4 ====
First round
Q	(Czech Republic) J Novák	6	7
(Switzerland) M Rosset	3	5
Q	(Netherlands) J van Lottum	5	6	6
(Netherlands) J Siemerink	7	1	4
(Argentina) M Zabaleta	3	4
10	(Spain) Á Costa	6	6
15	(Spain) F Mantilla	6	6
Q	(Argentina) F Squillari	2	4
(Italy) A Gaudenzi	1	6^{1}
(Ecuador) N Lapentti	6	7^{7}
Q	(Croatia) I Ljubičić	5	6	6
WC	(Ukraine) A Medvedev	7	0	1

Second round
8	(United Kingdom) G Rusedski	2	2
Q	(Czech Republic) J Novák	6	6
Q	(Netherlands) J van Lottum	2	3
10	(Spain) Á Costa	6	6
15	(Spain) F Mantilla	7	7^{7}
(Ecuador) N Lapentti	5	6^{4}
Q	(Croatia) I Ljubičić	6	6
2	(Russia) Y Kafelnikov	1	2

Third round
Q	(Czech Republic) J Novák	6	2	4
10	(Spain) Á Costa	4	6	6
15	(Spain) F Mantilla	6	6
Q	(Croatia) I Ljubičić	2	2

Quarterfinals
10	(Spain) Á Costa	4	7^{7}	6^{4}
15	(Spain) F Mantilla	6	6^{2}	7^{7}
