= 2000 Monte Carlo Masters – Doubles =

Doubles
- 2000 Monte Carlo Masters

Final
- Champions: (South Africa) Wayne Ferreira (Russia) Yevgeny Kafelnikov
- Runners-up: (Netherlands) Paul Haarhuis (Australia) Sandon Stolle
- Score: 6–3, 2–6, 6–1

Details
- Draw: 32 (6WC/2Q)
- Seeds: 8

Events
Singles	Doubles
← 1999 ·	Monte Carlo Masters	· 2001 →

Olivier Delaître and Tim Henman were the defending champions, but lost in second round to tournament runners-up Paul Haarhuis and Sandon Stolle.

Wayne Ferreira and Yevgeny Kafelnikov won the title by defeating Paul Haarhuis and Sandon Stolle 6–3, 2–6, 6–1 in the final.

== Seeds ==
1. (United States) Alex O'Brien / (United States) Jared Palmer (semifinals)
2. (South Africa) Ellis Ferreira / (United States) Rick Leach (quarterfinals)
3. (Netherlands) Paul Haarhuis / (Australia) Sandon Stolle (final)
4. (South Africa) David Adams / (South Africa) John-Laffnie de Jager (second round)
5. (Czech Republic) Jiří Novák / (Czech Republic) David Rikl (quarterfinals)
6. (Sweden) Jonas Björkman / (France) Fabrice Santoro (first round)
7. (South Africa) Piet Norval / (Zimbabwe) Kevin Ullyett (first round)
8. (The Bahamas) Mark Knowles / (Belarus) Max Mirnyi (second round)

== Draw ==
=== Key ===
- Q = Qualifier
- WC = Wild card
- LL = Lucky loser
- Alt = Alternate
- ITF = ITF entry
- PR = Protected ranking
- SR = Special ranking
- SE = Special exempt
- JE = Junior exempt
- JR = Junior Accelerator Programme entrant
- CO = College Accelerator Programme entrant
- NG = Next Gen Accelerator Program entrant
- w/o = Walkover
- r = Retired
- d = Defaulted

=== Finals ===
Semifinals
1	(United States) Alex O'Brien (United States) Jared Palmer	2	3
(South Africa) Wayne Ferreira (Russia) Yevgeny Kafelnikov	6	6
3	(Netherlands) Paul Haarhuis (Australia) Sandon Stolle	7^{7}	6
WC	(France) Nicolas Escudé (Switzerland) Roger Federer	6^{4}	4

Final
(South Africa) Wayne Ferreira (Russia) Yevgeny Kafelnikov	6	2	6
3	(Netherlands) Paul Haarhuis (Australia) Sandon Stolle	3	6	1

=== Top half ===
First round
1	(United States) A O'Brien (United States) J Palmer	4	7^{7}	6
(United States) P Galbraith (United States) B MacPhie	6	6^{4}	3
(Czech Republic) C Suk (Czech Republic) D Vacek	4	6^{5}
(Argentina) L Arnold Ker (Argentina) M García	6	7^{7}
(South Africa) C Haggard (Russia) A Olhovskiy	6	4	5
(United States) S Humphries (United States) E Taino	4	6	7
(Sweden) N Kulti (Sweden) M Tillström	6	3	6
7	(South Africa) P Norval (Zimbabwe) K Ullyett	4	6	1
4	(South Africa) D Adams (South Africa) JL de Jager	2	7^{7}	6
(Australia) W Arthurs (Federal Republic of Yugoslavia) N Zimonjić	6	6^{4}	3
(North Macedonia) A Kitinov (Belgium) T Vanhoudt	3	2
(Spain) T Carbonell (United States) D Johnson	6	6
(Argentina) P Albano (South Africa) R Koenig	2	1
(South Africa) W Ferreira (Russia) Y Kafelnikov	6	6
WC	(Sweden) T Enqvist (Sweden) M Norman	7^{7}	6
6	(Sweden) J Björkman (France) F Santoro	6^{2}	2

Second round
1	(United States) A O'Brien (United States) J Palmer	6	1	7^{7}
(Argentina) L Arnold Ker (Argentina) M García	1	6	6^{5}
(United States) S Humphries (United States) E Taino	4	2
(Sweden) N Kulti (Sweden) M Tillström	6	6
4	(South Africa) D Adams (South Africa) JL de Jager	4	4
(Spain) T Carbonell (United States) D Johnson	6	6
(South Africa) W Ferreira (Russia) Y Kafelnikov	2	6	6
WC	(Sweden) T Enqvist (Sweden) M Norman	6	2	2

Quarterfinals
1	(United States) A O'Brien (United States) J Palmer	7	6
(Sweden) N Kulti (Sweden) M Tillström	5	3
(Spain) T Carbonell (United States) D Johnson	2	3
(South Africa) W Ferreira (Russia) Y Kafelnikov	6	6

Semifinals
1	(United States) A O'Brien (United States) J Palmer	2	3
(South Africa) W Ferreira (Russia) Y Kafelnikov	6	6

=== Bottom half ===
First round
5	(Czech Republic) J Novák (Czech Republic) D Rikl	6	6
WC	(Italy) A Gaudenzi (Italy) D Nargiso	0	4
(Italy) M Bertolini (Italy) C Brandi	1	4
(Australia) J Eagle (Australia) A Florent	6	6
(France) O Delaître (United Kingdom) T Henman	6	6
Q	(Austria) M Hipfl (Germany) R Schüttler	3	4
(United States) R Reneberg (United States) J Tarango	2	7	3
3	(Netherlands) P Haarhuis (Australia) S Stolle	6	5	6
8	(The Bahamas) M Knowles (Belarus) M Mirnyi	6	7^{7}
Q	(United States) F Montana (Japan) T Shimada	1	6^{3}
WC	(Croatia) G Ivanišević (Russia) M Safin	3	6^{1}
WC	(France) N Escudé (Switzerland) R Federer	6	7^{7}
WC	(France) A Clément (France) S Grosjean	6	6
WC	(France) C Pioline (Switzerland) M Rosset	1	3
(Australia) D Macpherson (Sweden) P Nyborg	6^{0}	5
2	(South Africa) E Ferreira (United States) R Leach	7^{7}	7

Second round
5	(Czech Republic) J Novák (Czech Republic) D Rikl	6	6
(Australia) J Eagle (Australia) A Florent	4	4
(France) O Delaître (United Kingdom) T Henman	3	6^{6}
3	(Netherlands) P Haarhuis (Australia) S Stolle	6	7^{8}
8	(The Bahamas) M Knowles (Belarus) M Mirnyi	6^{5}	4
WC	(France) N Escudé (Switzerland) R Federer	7^{7}	6
WC	(France) A Clément (France) S Grosjean	5	3
2	(South Africa) E Ferreira (United States) R Leach	7	6

Quarterfinals
5	(Czech Republic) J Novák (Czech Republic) D Rikl	3	6^{9}
3	(Netherlands) P Haarhuis (Australia) S Stolle	6	7^{11}
WC	(France) N Escudé (Switzerland) R Federer	6	6
2	(South Africa) E Ferreira (United States) R Leach	4	2

Semifinals
3	(Netherlands) P Haarhuis (Australia) S Stolle	7^{7}	6
WC	(France) N Escudé (Switzerland) R Federer	6^{4}	4

== Qualifying ==
=== Qualifying seeds ===
1. (Australia) Michael Hill / (Slovakia) Dominik Hrbatý (first round)
2. (United States) Devin Bowen / (Argentina) Martín Rodríguez (qualifying competition)
3. (Argentina) Daniel Orsanic / (Brazil) Antonio Prieto (first round)
4. (Spain) Albert Portas / (Spain) Germán Puentes (first round)

=== Qualifiers ===
1. (Austria) Markus Hipfl / (Germany) Rainer Schüttler
2. (United States) Francisco Montana / (Japan) Thomas Shimada

=== Qualifying draw ===
==== First qualifier ====
First round
1	(Australia) Michael Hill (Slovakia) Dominik Hrbatý	5	6	2
WC	(Austria) Markus Hipfl (Germany) Rainer Schüttler	7	2	6
WC	(France) Paul-Henri Mathieu (France) Cyril Saulnier	4	6	7
4	(Spain) Albert Portas (Spain) Germán Puentes	6	1	5

Qualifying competition
WC	(Austria) Markus Hipfl (Germany) Rainer Schüttler	6	7
WC	(France) Paul-Henri Mathieu (France) Cyril Saulnier	2	5

==== Second qualifier ====
First round
2	(United States) Devin Bowen (Argentina) Martín Rodríguez	7	6
WC	(France) Julien Boutter (France) Michaël Llodra	5	2
(United States) Francisco Montana (Japan) Thomas Shimada	7	6
3	(Argentina) Daniel Orsanic (Brazil) Antonio Prieto	5	3

Qualifying competition
2	(United States) Devin Bowen (Argentina) Martín Rodríguez	3	7^{7}	5
(United States) Francisco Montana (Japan) Thomas Shimada	6	6^{2}	7
