= 1998 Australian Open – Men's singles =

Men's singles
- 1998 Australian Open

Final
- Champion: (Czech Republic) Petr Korda
- Runner-up: (Chile) Marcelo Ríos
- Score: 6–2, 6–2, 6–2

Details
- Draw: 128
- Seeds: 16

Events
Singles	men	women		boys	girls
Doubles	men	women	mixed	boys	girls
WC Singles	men	women	quad
WC Doubles	men	women	quad
Legends	men	women	mixed
- Australian Open

Petr Korda defeated Marcelo Ríos in the final, 6–2, 6–2, 6–2 to win the men's singles tennis title at the 1998 Australian Open. It was his first and only major title, becoming the first Czech player to win a major singles title (following the Czech Republic's independence from Czechoslovakia at the end of 1992). It was Ríos' only major final; he remains the only man to have held the world No. 1 singles ranking without ever winning a major singles title. Ríos was the first Chilean player to reach the major singles final since Luis Ayala in 1960, and the first Chilean player in hard court final.

Pete Sampras was the defending champion, but lost to Karol Kučera in the quarterfinals. This meant that no Americans made the semifinals at the event for the first time since 1990.

== Seeds ==
1. (United States) Pete Sampras (quarterfinals)
2. (Australia) Patrick Rafter (third round)
3. (United States) Michael Chang (second round)
4. (Sweden) Jonas Björkman (quarterfinals)
5. (United Kingdom) Greg Rusedski (third round)
6. (Czech Republic) Petr Korda (champion)
7. (Spain) Carlos Moyà (second round)
8. (Austria) Thomas Muster (first round)
9. (Chile) Marcelo Ríos (final)
10. (Spain) Sergi Bruguera (first round)
11. (Spain) Àlex Corretja (third round)
12. (Brazil) Gustavo Kuerten (second round)
13. (Croatia) Goran Ivanišević (first round)
14. (Spain) Félix Mantilla (first round)
15. (Australia) Mark Philippoussis (second round)
16. (Spain) Albert Costa (second round)

== Draw ==
Key

- Q = Qualifier
- WC = Wild card
- LL = Lucky loser
- Alt = Alternate
- ITF = ITF entry
- PR = Protected ranking
- SR = Special ranking
- SE = Special exempt
- JE = Junior exempt
- JR = Junior Accelerator Programme entrant
- CO = College Accelerator Programme entrant
- NG = Next Gen Accelerator Program entrant
- w/o = Walkover
- r = Retired
- d = Defaulted

=== Finals ===
Quarterfinals
1	(United States) Pete Sampras	4	2	7^{7}	3
(Slovakia) Karol Kučera	6	6	6^{5}	6
4	(Sweden) Jonas Björkman	6	7	3	4	2
6	(Czech Republic) Petr Korda	3	5	6	6	6
(France) Nicolas Escudé	4	3	6	6	6
(Germany) Nicolas Kiefer	6	6	4	1	2
9	(Chile) Marcelo Ríos	6^{6}	6	6	6
(Spain) Alberto Berasategui	7^{8}	4	4	0

Semifinals
(Slovakia) Karol Kučera	1	4	6	2
6	(Czech Republic) Petr Korda	6	6	1	6
(France) Nicolas Escudé	1	3	2
9	(Chile) Marcelo Ríos	6	6	6

Final
6	(Czech Republic) Petr Korda	6	6	6
9	(Chile) Marcelo Ríos	2	2	2

=== Top half ===
==== Section 1 ====
First round
1	(United States) P Sampras	7	6	6
(Netherlands) S Schalken	5	4	2
(Spain) A Martín	0	6	6^{8}	3
(Italy) D Sanguinetti	6	3	7^{10}	6
(Sweden) M Gustafsson	6	6	6
Q	(Netherlands) D van Scheppingen	4	3	0
(Czech Republic) S Doseděl	6	3	6	7^{7}
(France) A Boetsch	4	6	3	6^{2}
(Spain) F Clavet	2	6	6	6
Q	(Germany) L Burgsmüller	6	2	3	4
(Czech Republic) R Vašek	2	4	6	5
(United States) M Washington	6	6	4	7
(Germany) H Dreekmann	6^{2}	3	2
(Morocco) H Arazi	7^{7}	6	6
(Spain) Á Calatrava	6^{0}	4	6^{4}
15	(Australia) M Philippoussis	7^{7}	6	7^{7}

Second round
1	(United States) P Sampras	6	6	6
(Italy) D Sanguinetti	2	1	2
(Sweden) M Gustafsson	4	6	6	6
(Czech Republic) S Doseděl	6	2	1	3
(Spain) F Clavet	w/o
(United States) M Washington
(Morocco) H Arazi	1	6	4	6	9
15	(Australia) M Philippoussis	6	2	6	1	7

Third round
1	(United States) P Sampras	7	6	6
(Sweden) M Gustafsson	5	3	4
(Spain) F Clavet	6	4	6	2	1
(Morocco) H Arazi	4	6	3	6	6

Fourth round
1	(United States) P Sampras	7^{11}	6	6
(Morocco) H Arazi	6^{9}	4	4

==== Section 2 ====
First round
10	(Spain) S Bruguera	6	5	1	r
(Slovakia) K Kučera	3	7	6
(Czech Republic) D Vacek	6	6	1	2	6
WC	(Australia) L Hewitt	2	4	6	6	3
(Austria) G Schaller	3	0	6^{6}
(Canada) D Nestor	6	6	7^{8}
(Czech Republic) M Damm	6	7^{7}	3
(Australia) M Woodforde	4	6^{3}	0	r
(Sweden) M Tillström	6	6	6
WC	(India) L Paes	3	2	2
Q	(Canada) S Lareau	6	6^{5}	7^{8}	6^{4}	7
(Sweden) M Norman	4	7^{7}	6^{6}	7^{7}	5
(Australia) R Fromberg	2	6	6	3	6
WC	(Australia) T Larkham	6	3	4	6	3
WC	(Australia) P Tramacchi	4	3	7^{8}	6^{3}
7	(Spain) C Moyà	6	6	6^{6}	7^{7}

Second round
(Slovakia) K Kučera	7^{7}	6^{5}	2	6	6
(Czech Republic) D Vacek	6^{4}	7^{7}	6	0	1
(Canada) D Nestor	5	7	6	6
(Czech Republic) M Damm	7	5	2	1
(Sweden) M Tillström	7^{7}	3	3	6	4
Q	(Canada) S Lareau	6^{1}	6	6	4	6
(Australia) R Fromberg	4	6	7^{7}	6
7	(Spain) C Moyà	6	4	6^{2}	4

Third round
(Slovakia) K Kučera	6	7^{7}	6
(Canada) D Nestor	2	6^{3}	1
Q	(Canada) S Lareau	0	2	6	3
(Australia) R Fromberg	6	6	4	6

Fourth round
(Slovakia) K Kučera	6	3	6	7
(Australia) R Fromberg	2	6	2	5

==== Section 3 ====
First round
4	(Sweden) J Björkman	2	6	6	6
WC	(Australia) A Belobrajdic	6	1	1	1
(South Africa) W Ferreira	6	3	6	6
(Slovakia) J Krošlák	4	6	2	3
(Ecuador) N Lapentti	5	6	6	6^{3}	6
(Spain) JA Viloca	7	3	4	7^{7}	1
(Spain) E Benfele Álvarez	6	0	3	7	4
(France) F Santoro	4	6	6	5	6
(United States) J Gimelstob	6	3	6	3	4
Q	(United States) S Campbell	3	6	3	6	6
Q	(United States) J-M Gambill	6	5	1	3
(United States) A O'Brien	3	7	6	6
(France) A Clément	4	6	7	2	4
(Italy) G Pozzi	6	4	5	6	6
(Zimbabwe) B Black	6	6	4	6
14	(Spain) F Mantilla	4	0	6	4

Second round
4	(Sweden) J Björkman	6^{3}	4	6	6	6
(South Africa) W Ferreira	7^{7}	6	4	2	3
(Ecuador) N Lapentti	4	6	6	2	4
(France) F Santoro	6	3	3	6	6
Q	(United States) S Campbell	6	6	6
(United States) A O'Brien	4	3	4
(Italy) G Pozzi	2	0	r
(Zimbabwe) B Black	6	5

Third round
4	(Sweden) J Björkman	7	6	6
(France) F Santoro	5	3	4
Q	(United States) S Campbell	4	0	2
(Zimbabwe) B Black	6	6	6

Fourth round
4	(Sweden) J Björkman	6	6	6
(Zimbabwe) B Black	2	1	4

==== Section 4 ====
First round
11	(Spain) À Corretja	6	7	2	6
(Argentina) L Arnold Ker	4	5	6	3
(Germany) D Prinosil	3	6^{2}	6	6	6
(Belgium) J Van Herck	6	7^{7}	1	4	1
(Brazil) F Meligeni	4	6	5	r
(France) C Pioline	6	1	6
(Armenia) S Sargsian	3	4	6	6	7
(Spain) J Burillo	6	6	1	3	9
Q	(United States) B MacPhie	4	6	4	6	4
(Switzerland) M Rosset	6	0	6	3	6
(United States) V Spadea	6^{4}	6	6	6^{3}	6
WC	(Australia) J Stasiak	7^{7}	1	4	7^{7}	3
(Australia) S Draper	6	7	7
(Slovakia) D Hrbatý	4	5	5
(Spain) A Portas	3	6	1	4
6	(Czech Republic) P Korda	6	4	6	6

Second round
11	(Spain) À Corretja	6	6	6
(Germany) D Prinosil	4	3	0
(France) C Pioline	6	7	3	6
(Spain) J Burillo	3	5	6	3
(Switzerland) M Rosset	3	6	4	3
(United States) V Spadea	6	4	6	6
(Australia) S Draper	6^{3}	3	3
6	(Czech Republic) P Korda	7^{7}	6	6

Third round
11	(Spain) À Corretja	2	1	4
(France) C Pioline	6	6	6
(United States) V Spadea	2	6^{8}	2
6	(Czech Republic) P Korda	6	7^{10}	6

Fourth round
(France) C Pioline	4	4	6	3
6	(Czech Republic) P Korda	6	6	3	6

=== Bottom half ===
==== Section 5 ====
First round
5	(United Kingdom) G Rusedski	7^{7}	6	6
Q	(United States) D Witt	6^{4}	3	4
(United States) J Stark	6	4
(Spain) C Costa	3	1	r
(Australia) T Woodbridge	7	6	7
(Belgium) F Dewulf	5	3	5
(Norway) C Ruud	6^{4}	6	6	4	3
Q	(Belgium) C Van Garsse	7^{7}	4	1	6	6
(Sweden) T Johansson	4	6	3	7^{8}	6
(Argentina) F Squillari	6	2	6	6^{6}	8
(South Africa) M Ondruska	3	1	1
(United States) R Reneberg	6	6	6
(France) N Escudé	5	4	7	6	10
(Sweden) M Larsson	7	6	5	1	8
Q	(Spain) J Díaz	3	6	3	2
12	(Brazil) G Kuerten	6	3	6	6

Second round
5	(United Kingdom) G Rusedski	6	6	1
(United States) J Stark	4	4	0	r
(Australia) T Woodbridge	6	4	6	6
Q	(Belgium) C Van Garsse	4	6	3	4
(Argentina) F Squillari	0	4	6	6	3
(United States) R Reneberg	6	6	1	4	6
(France) N Escudé	5	6	6	7
12	(Brazil) G Kuerten	7	3	1	5

Third round
5	(United Kingdom) G Rusedski	6^{5}	4	2
(Australia) T Woodbridge	7^{7}	6	6
(United States) R Reneberg	6	7^{7}	2	5	4
(France) N Escudé	1	6^{0}	6	7	6

Fourth round
(Australia) T Woodbridge	6^{4}	3	2
(France) N Escudé	7^{7}	6	6

==== Section 6 ====
First round
13	(Croatia) G Ivanišević	2	6^{3}	6	4
(Netherlands) J Siemerink	6	7^{7}	3	6
Q	(France) J Golmard	6	6^{3}	6	3	11
(United Kingdom) T Henman	3	7^{7}	2	6	9
(Germany) M Craca	4	6	3	3
Q	(United States) D Wheaton	6	3	6	6
(Germany) N Kiefer	6	6	6
Q	(Australia) M Draper	4	4	0
WC	(Australia) M Tebbutt	7	7	6^{5}	6
(Uruguay) M Filippini	5	5	7^{7}	4
(Zimbabwe) W Black	6	6	6
(New Zealand) B Steven	4	2	2
(France) G Raoux	2	6	4	6	6
(Australia) S Stolle	6	3	6	2	0
(Denmark) K Carlsen	3	6^{2}	7	3
3	(United States) M Chang	6	7^{7}	5	6

Second round
(Netherlands) J Siemerink	6^{2}	5	7^{7}	6	1
Q	(France) J Golmard	7^{7}	7	6^{5}	3	6
Q	(United States) D Wheaton	6	6	2	6^{3}	2
(Germany) N Kiefer	2	1	6	7^{7}	6
WC	(Australia) M Tebbutt	2	4	7	4
(Zimbabwe) W Black	6	6	5	6
(France) G Raoux	6	7^{7}	7^{7}
3	(United States) M Chang	4	6^{4}	6^{5}

Third round
Q	(France) J Golmard	5	0	r
(Germany) N Kiefer	7	4
(Zimbabwe) W Black	3	2	5
(France) G Raoux	6	6	7

Fourth round
(Germany) N Kiefer	6	6	7
(France) G Raoux	3	4	5

==== Section 7 ====
First round
8	(Austria) T Muster	4	6^{5}	5
Q	(Sweden) J Apell	6	7^{7}	7
(Sweden) T Nydahl	3	6^{5}	3
(France) L Roux	6	7^{7}	6
(Germany) A Rădulescu	6^{0}	7	3	2
(Morocco) K Alami	7^{7}	5	6	6
(Italy) R Furlan	6^{9}	2	6	2
(Spain) J Alonso	7^{11}	6	2	6
(Australia) J Stoltenberg	6
(Spain) G Blanco	2	r
Q	(Australia) A Ilie	6	6	6
(Germany) J Knippschild	4	2	3
(Sweden) T Enqvist	6	6	6
(Spain) JA Marín	3	4	3
(South Africa) G Stafford	1	3	3
9	(Chile) M Ríos	6	6	6

Second round
Q	(Sweden) J Apell	3	7^{7}	3	6	3
(France) L Roux	6	6^{5}	6	3	6
(Morocco) K Alami	6^{5}	6	7^{7}	6
(Spain) J Alonso	7^{7}	3	6^{4}	4
(Australia) J Stoltenberg	3	2	6^{6}
Q	(Australia) A Ilie	6	6	7^{8}
(Sweden) T Enqvist	4	6^{4}	6	4
9	(Chile) M Ríos	6	7^{7}	4	6

Third round
(France) L Roux	7^{7}	6	6
(Morocco) K Alami	6^{2}	2	4
Q	(Australia) A Ilie	2	3	2
9	(Chile) M Ríos	6	6	6

Fourth round
(France) L Roux	2	6	2	4
9	(Chile) M Ríos	6	4	6	6

==== Section 8 ====
First round
16	(Spain) A Costa	7^{7}	6	6
(Germany) T Haas	6^{5}	2	4
Q	(Italy) M Martelli	6	6^{3}	2	2
(United States) A Agassi	3	7^{7}	6	6
(Germany) O Gross	7^{10}	6	6
(Germany) M-K Goellner	6^{8}	4	2
(Italy) A Gaudenzi	6	4	6	6
(Romania) D Pescariu	2	6	2	2
(Spain) A Berasategui	3	6	6	6
Q	(Germany) K Braasch	6	3	4	3
WC	(Australia) L Smith	2	0	2
(Ukraine) A Medvedev	6	6	6
(Spain) J Sánchez	1	4	1
(United States) T Martin	6	6	6
(United States) J Tarango	6^{4}	6^{4}	7^{7}	5
2	(Australia) P Rafter	7^{7}	7^{7}	6^{4}	7

Second round
16	(Spain) A Costa	4	4	6	5
(United States) A Agassi	6	6	2	7
(Germany) O Gross	6	1	4	4
(Italy) A Gaudenzi	4	6	6	6
(Spain) A Berasategui	6	7^{7}	6
(Ukraine) A Medvedev	4	6^{1}	4
(United States) T Martin	6	6^{2}	7^{7}	4	3
2	(Australia) P Rafter	2	7^{7}	6^{4}	6	6

Third round
(United States) A Agassi	6	6	6
(Italy) A Gaudenzi	2	2	0
(Spain) A Berasategui	6^{2}	7^{9}	6	7^{7}
2	(Australia) P Rafter	7^{7}	6^{7}	2	6^{4}

Fourth round
(United States) A Agassi	6	6	2	3	3
(Spain) A Berasategui	3	3	6	6	6

Preceded by 1997 US Open – Men's singles	Grand Slam men's singles	Succeeded by 1998 French Open – Men's singles
