= 2001 Monte Carlo Masters – Singles =

Singles
- 2001 Monte Carlo Masters

Final
- Champion: (Brazil) Gustavo Kuerten
- Runner-up: (Morocco) Hicham Arazi
- Score: 6–3, 6–2, 6–4

Details
- Draw: 64 (8Q / 4WC)
- Seeds: 16

Events
Singles	Doubles
← 2000 ·	Monte Carlo Masters	· 2002 →

Gustavo Kuerten defeated Hicham Arazi in the final, 6–3, 6–2, 6–4 to win the singles tennis title at the 2001 Monte Carlo Masters.

Cédric Pioline was the defending champion, but lost in the third round to Arazi.

== Seeds ==
1. (Russia) Marat Safin (first round)
2. (Brazil) Gustavo Kuerten (champion)
3. (Sweden) Magnus Norman (second round)
4. (Russia) Yevgeny Kafelnikov (first round)
5. (Spain) Àlex Corretja (first round)
6. (France) Arnaud Clément (first round)
7. (Spain) Juan Carlos Ferrero (second round)
8. (United Kingdom) Tim Henman (quarterfinals)
9. (France) Sébastien Grosjean (semifinals)
10. (Slovakia) Dominik Hrbatý (first round)
11. (Sweden) Thomas Enqvist (second round)
12. (Argentina) Franco Squillari (second round)
13. (South Africa) Wayne Ferreira (first round)
14. (France) Cédric Pioline (third round)
15. (Switzerland) Roger Federer (quarterfinals)
16. (Spain) Carlos Moyá (second round)

== Draw ==
=== Key ===
- Q = Qualifier
- WC = Wild card
- LL = Lucky loser
- Alt = Alternate
- ITF = ITF entry
- PR = Protected ranking
- SR = Special ranking
- SE = Special exempt
- JE = Junior exempt
- JR = Junior Accelerator Programme entrant
- CO = College Accelerator Programme entrant
- NG = Next Gen Accelerator Program entrant
- w/o = Walkover
- r = Retired
- d = Defaulted

=== Finals ===
Quarterfinals
15	(Switzerland) Roger Federer	4	3
9	(France) Sébastien Grosjean	6	6
(Morocco) Hicham Arazi	7^{7}	2	7^{7}
8	(United Kingdom) Tim Henman	6^{3}	6	6^{2}
(Argentina) Guillermo Coria	6	4	6
Q	(Spain) Alberto Martín	3	6	3
(Netherlands) Sjeng Schalken	7^{7}	2	4
2	(Brazil) Gustavo Kuerten	6^{1}	6	6

Semifinals
9	(France) Sébastien Grosjean	4	4
(Morocco) Hicham Arazi	6	6
(Argentina) Guillermo Coria	4	2
2	(Brazil) Gustavo Kuerten	6	6

Final
(Morocco) Hicham Arazi	3	2	4
2	(Brazil) Gustavo Kuerten	6	6	6

=== Top half ===
==== Section 1 ====
First round
1	(Russia) M Safin	3	1
(France) A di Pasquale	6	6
(France) J Boutter	6	5	4
(Spain) Á Calatrava	2	7	6
(Italy) D Sanguinetti	7^{7}	6^{2}	6
(Ukraine) A Medvedev	6^{2}	7^{7}	4
(United States) M Chang	4	3
15	(Switzerland) R Federer	6	6
9	(France) S Grosjean	6	7
(Spain) F Clavet	4	5
(Czech Republic) B Ulihrach	6	6
Q	(Spain) J Balcells	4	2
(United Kingdom) G Rusedski	6^{5}	5
(Romania) A Pavel	7^{7}	7
Q	(Sweden) M Gustafsson	6^{5}	6	6
5	(Spain) À Corretja	7^{7}	2	2

Second round
(France) A di Pasquale	6	6
(Spain) Á Calatrava	4	4
(Italy) D Sanguinetti	6^{5}	6^{0}
15	(Switzerland) R Federer	7^{7}	7^{7}
9	(France) S Grosjean	7	6
(Czech Republic) B Ulihrach	5	3
(Romania) A Pavel	2	7^{7}	3
Q	(Sweden) M Gustafsson	6	6^{4}	6

Third round
(France) A di Pasquale	1	2
15	(Switzerland) R Federer	6	6
9	(France) S Grosjean	6	6
Q	(Sweden) M Gustafsson	4	3

Quarterfinals
15	(Switzerland) R Federer	4	3
9	(France) S Grosjean	6	6

==== Section 2 ====
First round
3	(Sweden) M Norman	6	6
(France) N Escudé	2	2
(Argentina) M Puerta	0^{r}
(Morocco) H Arazi	1
(Sweden) T Johansson	2	4
(Australia) A Ilie	6	6
(Germany) D Prinosil	2	1
14	(France) C Pioline	6	6
10	(Slovakia) D Hrbatý	5	4
(Spain) A Costa	7	6
Q	(Slovakia) K Kučera	4	4
(Chile) M Ríos	6	6
(Argentina) G Gaudio	7	6
(Israel) H Levy	5	2
(France) F Santoro	3	0
8	(United Kingdom) T Henman	6	6

Second round
3	(Sweden) M Norman	2	4
(Morocco) H Arazi	6	6
(Australia) A Ilie	6^{2}	2
14	(France) C Pioline	7^{7}	6
(Spain) A Costa	w/o
(Chile) M Ríos
(Argentina) G Gaudio	4	2
8	(United Kingdom) T Henman	6	6

Third round
(Morocco) H Arazi	7^{7}	6
14	(France) C Pioline	6^{4}	1
(Spain) A Costa	6	6^{6}	1
8	(United Kingdom) T Henman	2	7^{8}	6

Quarterfinals
(Morocco) H Arazi	7^{7}	2	7^{7}
8	(United Kingdom) T Henman	6^{3}	6	6^{2}

=== Bottom half ===
==== Section 3 ====
First round
7	(Spain) J C Ferrero	6	6
WC	(Spain) S Bruguera	2	1
(Ecuador) N Lapentti	5	2^{r}
Q	(Spain) G Blanco	7	3
(Sweden) A Vinciguerra	1	4
(Argentina) G Coria	6	6
(Italy) G Pozzi	2	2
12	(Argentina) F Squillari	6	6
13	(South Africa) W Ferreira	5	6	2
(Sweden) J Björkman	7	3	6
Q	(Russia) M Youzhny	6	6
(Germany) N Kiefer	3	0
(Czech Republic) J Novák	5	6^{9}
Q	(Spain) A Martín	7	7^{11}
Q	(Austria) M Hipfl	5	6	7
4	(Russia) Y Kafelnikov	7	2	5

Second round
7	(Spain) J C Ferrero	2	6^{3}
Q	(Spain) G Blanco	6	7^{7}
(Argentina) G Coria	4	6	6
12	(Argentina) F Squillari	6	1	2
(Sweden) J Björkman	4	6	0
Q	(Russia) M Youzhny	6	0	6
Q	(Spain) A Martín	6	6
Q	(Austria) M Hipfl	4	2

Third round
Q	(Spain) G Blanco	5	1
(Argentina) G Coria	7	6
Q	(Russia) M Youzhny	3	4
Q	(Spain) A Martín	6	6

Quarterfinals
(Argentina) G Coria	6	4	6
Q	(Spain) A Martín	3	6	3

==== Section 4 ====
First round
6	(France) A Clément	7^{7}	1	6^{4}
WC	(France) J Golmard	6^{4}	6	7^{7}
(Belarus) V Voltchkov	1	4
(Spain) A Portas	6	6
(Netherlands) S Schalken	6	6
WC	(Morocco) K Alami	2	0
(Germany) R Schüttler	2	6	3
11	(Sweden) T Enqvist	6	4	6
16	(Spain) C Moyá	6	6
WC	(Switzerland) M Rosset	4	4
(Germany) T Haas	6	6
(Belarus) M Mirnyi	0	1
(Spain) F Vicente	0	6	6
Q	(Croatia) I Ljubičić	6	4	1
(Morocco) Y El Aynaoui	4	6	4
2	(Brazil) G Kuerten	6	4	6

Second round
WC	(France) J Golmard	6	7^{7}
(Spain) A Portas	4	6^{2}
(Netherlands) S Schalken	2	6	6
11	(Sweden) T Enqvist	6	4	2
16	(Spain) C Moyá	6	3	3
(Germany) T Haas	1	6	6
(Spain) F Vicente	2	2
2	(Brazil) G Kuerten	6	6

Third round
WC	(France) J Golmard	6	0	1
(Netherlands) S Schalken	3	6	6
(Germany) T Haas	7^{8}	2	3
2	(Brazil) G Kuerten	6^{6}	6	6

Quarterfinals
(Netherlands) S Schalken	7^{7}	2	4
2	(Brazil) G Kuerten	6^{1}	6	6

== Qualifying ==
=== Qualifying seeds ===
1. (Chile) Nicolás Massú (first round)
2. (Spain) Joan Balcells (qualified)
3. (Spain) Alberto Martín (qualified)
4. (Argentina) Agustín Calleri (qualifying competition)
5. (Slovakia) Karol Kučera (qualified)
6. (Croatia) Ivan Ljubičić (qualified)
7. (Argentina) Mariano Zabaleta (first round)
8. (Sweden) Magnus Gustafsson (qualified)
9. (Spain) Galo Blanco (qualified)
10. (Switzerland) Michel Kratochvil (qualifying competition)
11. (Netherlands) Jan Siemerink (first round)
12. (Russia) Mikhail Youzhny (qualified)
13. (France) Antony Dupuis (qualifying competition)
14. (Czech Republic) Sláva Doseděl (first round)
15. (Russia) Andrei Stoliarov (first round)
16. (Armenia) Sargis Sargsian (first round)

=== Qualifiers ===
1. (Austria) Markus Hipfl
2. (Spain) Joan Balcells
3. (Spain) Alberto Martín
4. (Russia) Mikhail Youzhny
5. (Slovakia) Karol Kučera
6. (Croatia) Ivan Ljubičić
7. (Spain) Galo Blanco
8. (Sweden) Magnus Gustafsson

=== Qualifying draw ===
==== First qualifier ====
First round
1	(Chile) Nicolás Massú	3	1
(Italy) Andrea Gaudenzi	6	6
(Austria) Markus Hipfl	7	6
11	(Netherlands) Jan Siemerink	5	3

Qualifying competition
(Italy) Andrea Gaudenzi	3	1
(Austria) Markus Hipfl	6	6

==== Second qualifier ====
First round
2	(Spain) Joan Balcells	7	6
(Russia) Nikolay Davydenko	5	2
(France) Cyril Saulnier	6^{1}	6	6
15	(Russia) Andrei Stoliarov	7^{7}	4	1

Qualifying competition
2	(Spain) Joan Balcells	6	6
(France) Cyril Saulnier	2	4

==== Third qualifier ====
First round
3	(Spain) Alberto Martín	6	6
(France) Stéphane Huet	0	3
WC	(Netherlands) John van Lottum	6	1	6
16	(Armenia) Sargis Sargsian	2	6	3

Qualifying competition
3	(Spain) Alberto Martín	6	7^{10}
WC	(Netherlands) John van Lottum	3	6^{8}

==== Fourth qualifier ====
First round
4	(Argentina) Agustín Calleri	3	6	6
(France) Michaël Llodra	6	1	4
(Spain) Jacobo Díaz	4	6	4
12	(Russia) Mikhail Youzhny	6	2	6

Qualifying competition
4	(Argentina) Agustín Calleri	4	6	6^{5}
12	(Russia) Mikhail Youzhny	6	3	7^{7}

==== Fifth qualifier ====
First round
5	(Slovakia) Karol Kučera	4	6	6
(Germany) Lars Burgsmüller	6	2	3
(Czech Republic) Tomáš Zíb	3	7^{7}	3
10	(Switzerland) Michel Kratochvil	6	6^{1}	6

Qualifying competition
5	(Slovakia) Karol Kučera	6	6
10	(Switzerland) Michel Kratochvil	2	3

==== Sixth qualifier ====
First round
6	(Croatia) Ivan Ljubičić	6	6
WC	(Spain) Juan Albert Viloca	2	3
(Denmark) Kristian Pless	5	7^{7}	3
13	(France) Antony Dupuis	7	6^{4}	6

Qualifying competition
6	(Croatia) Ivan Ljubičić	7^{8}	6
13	(France) Antony Dupuis	6^{6}	4

==== Seventh qualifier ====
First round
7	(Argentina) Mariano Zabaleta	6	6^{4}	2
(Romania) Adrian Voinea	4	7^{7}	6
WC	(Italy) Renzo Furlan	3	1
9	(Spain) Galo Blanco	6	6

Qualifying competition
(Romania) Adrian Voinea	3	3
9	(Spain) Galo Blanco	6	6

==== Eighth qualifier ====
First round
8	(Sweden) Magnus Gustafsson	6	6
(Germany) Christian Vinck	4	3
WC	(France) Paul-Henri Mathieu	3	6	6
14	(Czech Republic) Sláva Doseděl	6	3	1

Qualifying competition
8	(Sweden) Magnus Gustafsson	6	6
WC	(France) Paul-Henri Mathieu	1	4
