= 1999 Monte Carlo Open =

- Date: 19–25 April
- Edition: 93rd
- Category: ATP Super 9
- Draw: 56S / 28D
- Prize money: $2,220,000
- Surface: Clay / outdoor
- Location: Roquebrune-Cap-Martin, France
- Venue: Monte Carlo Country Club

Champions

Singles
- (Brazil) Gustavo Kuerten

Doubles
- (France) Olivier Delaître / (United Kingdom) Tim Henman
← 1998 ·	Monte Carlo Open	· 2000 →

The 1999 Monte Carlo Open was a men's tennis tournament played on outdoor clay courts. It was the 93rd edition of the Monte Carlo Open, and was part of the ATP Super 9 of the 1999 ATP Tour. It took place at the Monte Carlo Country Club in Roquebrune-Cap-Martin, France, near Monte Carlo, Monaco, from 19 April through 25 April 1999.

Thirteenth-seeded Gustavo Kuerten won the singles title.

== Finals ==
=== Singles ===
(Brazil) Gustavo Kuerten defeated (Chile) Marcelo Ríos, 6–4, 2–1, retired

- It was Gustavo Kuerten's 1st title of the year, and his 4th overall. It was his 1st Masters title of the year, and overall.

=== Doubles ===
(France) Olivier Delaître / (United Kingdom) Tim Henman defeated (Czech Republic) Jiří Novák / (Czech Republic) David Rikl, 6–2, 6–3
