= Franco Squillari =

Argentine tennis player

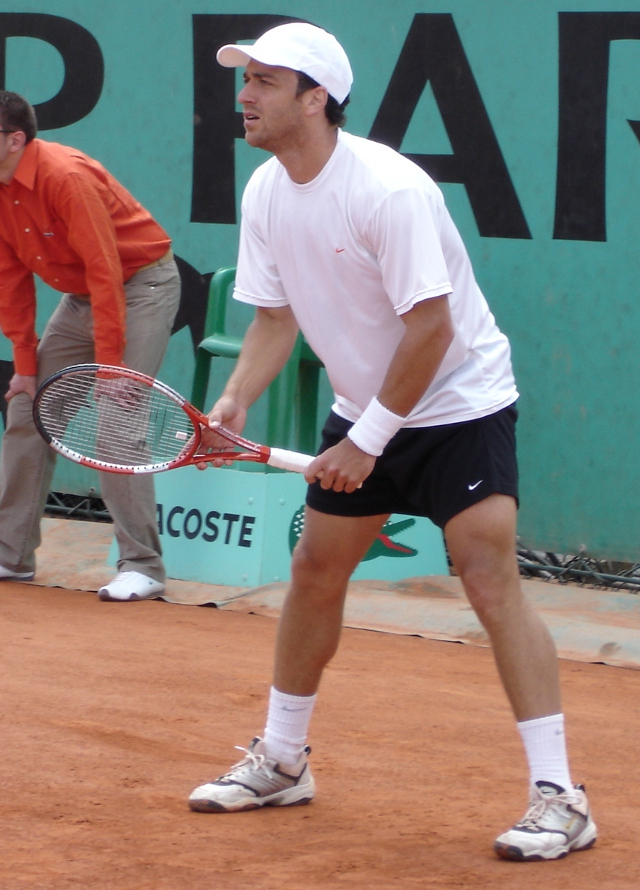
- Country (sports): Argentina
- Residence: Buenos Aires, Argentina
- Born: 22 August 1975 (age 50); Buenos Aires, Argentina
- Height: 1.82 m (5 ft 11 1/2 in)
- Turned pro: 1989
- Retired: 2005
- Plays: Left-handed (one-handed backhand)
- Prize money: $2,504,591

Singles
- Career record: 155–165
- Career titles: 3
- Highest ranking: No. 11 (18 September 2000)

Grand Slam singles results
- Australian Open: 3R (2000)
- French Open: SF (2000)
- Wimbledon: 2R (1998)
- US Open: 2R (2000)

Other tournaments
- Olympic Games: 1R (2000)

Doubles
- Career record: 2–4
- Career titles: 0
- Highest ranking: No. 387 (23 July 2001)

Franco Squillari (Spanish pronunciation: [ˈfɾaŋko (e)skiˈlaɾi]; born 22 August 1975) is an Argentine former professional male tennis player. He won 3 singles titles, reached the semifinals of the 2000 French Open and achieved a career-high singles ranking of World No. 11.

== Career ==
As a junior, Squillari won the 1993 South American Closed Junior Championships (in Paraguay).

Squillari entered the world's top 50 in 1998, and won a total of three ATP Tour singles titles (all in Germany) during his career. He reached the semifinals of the 2000 French Open defeating Alexander Popp, Jiří Vaněk, Karol Kučera, Younes El Aynaoui and future champion Albert Costa, before losing to Magnus Norman. He went on to reach the fourth round of the French Open the following year as well.

He reached three Masters quarterfinals: Rome in 1999 (where he beat world no. 3 Carlos Moya, Cincinnati in 2000 and Hamburg in 2001. He also beat world no. 3 Yevgeny Kafelnikov in Barcelona in 1999.

He is one of the few tennis players to have a perfect 100% record against Roger Federer, having beaten him both times they played, in 2001 and 2003.

Squillari retired in 2005.

== Career finals ==
=== Singles (3 wins, 3 losses) ===
Legend (singles)
Grand Slam (0)
Tennis Masters Cup (0)
ATP Masters Series (0)
ATP International Series Gold (1)
ATP Tour (2)

Result	W/L	Date	Tournament	Surface	Opponent	Score
Loss	0–1	Mar 1997	Casablanca, Morocco	Clay	(Morocco) Hicham Arazi	6–3, 1–6, 2–6
Loss	0–2	Oct 1998	Palermo, Italy	Clay	(Argentina) Mariano Puerta	3–6, 2–6
Win	1–2	May 1999	Munich, Germany	Clay	(Romania) Andrei Pavel	6–4, 6–3
Win	2–2	May 2000	Munich, Germany	Clay	(Germany) Tommy Haas	6–4, 6–4
Win	3–2	Jul 2000	Stuttgart, Germany	Clay	(Argentina) Gastón Gaudio	6–2, 3–6, 4–6, 6–4, 6–2
Loss	3–3	Jul 2002	Sopot, Poland	Clay	(Argentina) José Acasuso	6–2, 1–6, 3–6

== Grand Slam singles performance timeline ==
Key
W	F	SF	QF	#R	RR	Q#	DNQ	A	NH

(W) winner; (F) finalist; (SF) semifinalist; (QF) quarterfinalist; (#R) rounds 4, 3, 2, 1; (RR) round-robin stage; (Q#) qualification round; (DNQ) did not qualify; (A) absent; (NH) not held; (SR) strike rate (events won / competed); (W–L) win–loss record.

Tournament	1996	1997	1998	1999	2000	2001	2002	2003	2004	2005	SR	W–L
Grand Slam tournaments
Australian Open	A	A	2R	2R	3R	2R	1R	1R	A	A	0 / 6	5–6
French Open	2R	1R	A	1R	SF	4R	1R	2R	A	A	0 / 7	10–7
Wimbledon	A	A	2R	1R	1R	1R	1R	1R	A	A	0 / 6	1–6
US Open	A	A	1R	1R	2R	A	A	1R	A	A	0 / 4	1–4
Win–loss	1–1	0–1	2–3	1–4	8–4	4–3	0–3	1–4	0–0	0–0	0 / 23	17–23
ATP Masters Series
Indian Wells Masters	A	A	A	A	1R	1R	2R	A	A	A	0 / 3	1-3
Miami Masters	A	A	A	1R	1R	2R	4R	3R	2R	A	0 / 6	6–6
Monte Carlo Masters	A	A	A	1R	3R	2R	1R	A	A	A	0 / 4	3-4
Rome Masters	A	A	A	QF	2R	3R	1R	A	A	A	0 / 4	6–4
Hamburg Masters	A	A	A	2R	1R	QF	1R	A	A	A	0 / 4	5-4
Canada Masters			A					A	A	A	0 / 0	0–0
Cincinnati Masters			A					A	A	A	0 / 0	0–0
Madrid Masters (Stuttgart)		A	A				A	A	A	A	0 / 0	0–0
Paris Masters							A	A	A	A	0 / 0	0–0
Career Statistics
Titles	1	0	0	3	0	0	0	0	0	0	6	
Overall win–loss												
Year End Ranking	126	102	60	52	14	55	79	124	143	275		
