= Jérôme Golmard =

French tennis player

- Golmard in 2012
- Country (sports): France
- Born: 9 September 1973; Dijon, France
- Died: 31 July 2017 (aged 43)
- Height: 1.88 m (6 ft 2 in)
- Turned pro: 1993
- Retired: 2006
- Plays: Left-handed (two-handed backhand)
- Prize money: $2,215,784

Singles
- Career record: 144–143 (ATP Tour, Grand Slams and in Davis Cup)
- Career titles: 2
- Highest ranking: No. 22 (26 April 1999)

Grand Slam singles results
- Australian Open: 3R (1998, 2002)
- French Open: 2R (1997)
- Wimbledon: 3R (1998, 2000)
- US Open: 3R (2000)

Doubles
- Career record: 19–32 (ATP Tour, Grand Slams and in Davis Cup)
- Career titles: 0
- Highest ranking: No. 143 (12 October 1998)

Grand Slam doubles results
- French Open: 1R (1994, 1995, 1996, 1998, 2001, 2003)
- US Open: 1R (1998)

Grand Slam mixed doubles results
- French Open: QF (2001)
- Last updated on: 27 April 2022.

Jérôme Golmard (French pronunciation: [ʒeʁom ɡɔlmaʁ]; 9 September 1973 – 31 July 2017) was a French tennis player.

The left-hander reached a career-high singles ranking of World No. 22 in April 1999, winning 2 singles titles and reaching the semifinals of Monte Carlo in 1999. Golmard finished his career with over $2.2 million in prize money. Among the many notable players he beat on the ATP Tour are former World No. 1s Andre Agassi, Jim Courier, Gustavo Kuerten, Juan Carlos Ferrero, Marcelo Ríos and Carlos Moyá, as well as Grand Slam champions Richard Krajicek, Goran Ivanišević, Albert Costa, Gastón Gaudio, Thomas Johansson and Michael Chang.

He announced in 2014 that he was diagnosed with motor neuron disease, which causes muscle paralysis, and died of the disease on 31 July 2017.

== After tennis ==
Golmard was diagnosed with motor neurone disease in 2014 and died on 31 July 2017, at the age of 43.

== ATP career finals ==
=== Singles: 4 (2 titles, 2 runners-up) ===
| Legend Grand Slam Tournaments (0–0) ATP World Tour Finals (0–0) ATP Masters 1000 Series (0–0) ATP 500 Series (0–0) ATP 250 Series (2–2) | Finals by surface Hard (2–1) Clay (0–1) Grass (0–0) Carpet (0–0) | Finals by setting Outdoors (2–2) Indoors (0–0) |

| Result | W–L | Date | Tournament | Tier | Surface | Opponent | Score |
|---|---|---|---|---|---|---|---|
| Win | 1–0 | Feb 1999 | Dubai, Qatar | International Series | Hard | (Germany) Nicolas Kiefer | 6–4, 6–2 |
| Win | 2–0 | Jan 2000 | Chennai, India | International Series | Hard | (Germany) Markus Hantschk | 6–3, 7–6^{(7–5)} |
| Loss | 2–1 | Jul 2001 | Zagreb, Croatia | International Series | Clay | (Spain) Carlos Moyá | 4–6, 6–3, 6–7^{(2–7)} |
| Loss | 2–2 | Jan 2002 | Auckland, New Zealand | International Series | Hard | (United Kingdom) Greg Rusedski | 7–6^{(7–0)}, 4–6, 5–7 |

=== Doubles: 1 (1 runner-up) ===
| Legend Grand Slam Tournaments (0–0) ATP World Tour Finals (0–0) ATP Masters 1000 Series (0–0) ATP 500 Series (0–0) ATP 250 Series (0–1) | Finals by surface Hard (0–0) Clay (0–1) Grass (0–0) Carpet (0–0) | Finals by setting Outdoors (0–1) Indoors (0–0) |

| Result | W–L | Date | Tournament | Tier | Surface | Partner | Opponents | Score |
|---|---|---|---|---|---|---|---|---|
| Loss | 0–1 | Jul 2000 | Gstaad, Switzerland | International Series | Clay | (Germany) Michael Kohlmann | (Czech Republic) Jiří Novák (Czech Republic) David Rikl | 6–3, 3–6, 4–6 |

== ATP Challenger and ITF Futures finals ==
=== Singles: 12 (7–5) ===
| Legend ATP Challenger (7–5) ITF Futures (0–0) | Finals by surface Hard (4–2) Clay (3–3) Grass (0–0) Carpet (0–0) |

| Result | W–L | Date | Tournament | Tier | Surface | Opponent | Score |
|---|---|---|---|---|---|---|---|
| Win | 1-0 | Jun 1994 | Campinas, Brazil | Challenger | Clay | (Brazil) Fernando Meligeni | 6–4, 7–5 |
| Win | 2-0 | Jun 1995 | Medellín, Colombia | Challenger | Clay | (Brazil) Gustavo Kuerten | 6–3, 7–6 |
| Win | 3-0 | Jun 1995 | Bogotá, Colombia | Challenger | Clay | (Chile) Gabriel Silberstein | 2–6, 6–3, 6–2 |
| Loss | 3-1 | Jul 1995 | Quito, Ecuador | Challenger | Clay | (Ecuador) Luis Morejon | 4–6, 6–5 ret. |
| Loss | 3-2 | Oct 1995 | Brest, France | Challenger | Hard | (Russia) Andrei Chesnokov | 4–6, 3–6 |
| Win | 4-2 | Aug 1996 | Segovia, Spain | Challenger | Hard | (Spain) Emilio Sánchez | 6–4, 6–3 |
| Win | 5-2 | Mar 1998 | Cherbourg, France | Challenger | Hard | (Italy) Gianluca Pozzi | 3–6, 6–4, 6–3 |
| Win | 6-2 | Nov 1998 | Brest, France | Challenger | Hard | (France) Jean-Baptiste Perlant | 6–4, 6–4 |
| Loss | 6-3 | May 2000 | Budapest, Hungary | Challenger | Clay | (Netherlands) Edwin Kempes | 4–6, ret. |
| Loss | 6-4 | Jun 2000 | Prostějov, Czech Republic | Challenger | Clay | (Sweden) Andreas Vinciguerra | walkover |
| Loss | 6-5 | Nov 2002 | Prague, Czech Republic | Challenger | Hard | (Croatia) Mario Ančić | 1–6, 1–6 |
| Win | 7-5 | Apr 2003 | Calabasas, United States | Challenger | Hard | (Germany) Lars Burgsmüller | 6–3, 7–5 |

=== Doubles: 4 (1–3) ===
| Legend ATP Challenger (1–3) ITF Futures (0–0) | Finals by surface Hard (1–2) Clay (0–1) Grass (0–0) Carpet (0–0) |

| Result | W–L | Date | Tournament | Tier | Surface | Partner | Opponents | Score |
|---|---|---|---|---|---|---|---|---|
| Loss | 0-1 | Oct 1997 | Seoul, South Kores | Challenger | Clay | (France) Régis Lavergne | (Netherlands) Edwin Kempes (Japan) Gouichi Motomura | 5–7, 5–7 |
| Win | 1-1 | Nov 1997 | Andorra la Vella, Andorra | Challenger | Hard | (France) Nicolas Escudé | (Netherlands) Tom Kempers (Netherlands) Menno Oosting | 6–4, 6–4 |
| Loss | 1-2 | Nov 1997 | Reunion Island, Réunion | Challenger | Hard | (Spain) Álex Calatrava | (South Africa) Clinton Ferreira (Netherlands) Jan Siemerink | 2–6, 3–6 |
| Loss | 1-3 | Jan 2005 | Nouméa, New Caledonia | Challenger | Hard | (Israel) Harel Levy | (Australia) Stephen Huss (South Africa) Wesley Moodie | 3–6, 0–6 |

== Performance timeline ==
Key
| W | F | SF | QF | #R | RR | Q# | DNQ | A | NH |

(W) winner; (F) finalist; (SF) semifinalist; (QF) quarterfinalist; (#R) rounds 4, 3, 2, 1; (RR) round-robin stage; (Q#) qualification round; (DNQ) did not qualify; (A) absent; (NH) not held; (SR) strike rate (events won / competed); (W–L) win–loss record.

=== Singles ===
| Tournament | 1994 | 1995 | 1996 | 1997 | 1998 | 1999 | 2000 | 2001 | 2002 | 2003 | 2004 | 2005 | SR | W–L | Win % |
|---|---|---|---|---|---|---|---|---|---|---|---|---|---|---|---|
Grand Slam tournaments
| Australian Open | A | 2R | A | Q1 | 3R | 2R | 1R | A | 3R | 1R | 2R | Q1 | 0 / 7 | 7–7 | 50% |
| French Open | Q3 | 1R | 1R | 2R | 1R | A | 1R | 1R | A | 1R | A | Q1 | 0 / 7 | 1–7 | 13% |
| Wimbledon | A | A | 1R | 2R | 3R | A | 3R | A | 1R | A | Q2 | Q2 | 0 / 5 | 5–5 | 50% |
| US Open | Q2 | 2R | A | 2R | 2R | A | 3R | 2R | 1R | A | 2R | A | 0 / 7 | 7–7 | 50% |
| Win–loss | 0–0 | 2–3 | 0–2 | 3–3 | 5–4 | 1–1 | 4–4 | 1–2 | 2–3 | 0–2 | 2–2 | 0–0 | 0 / 26 | 20–26 | 43% |
ATP World Tour Masters 1000
| Indian Wells | A | 1R | A | Q1 | Q1 | A | 1R | A | A | A | Q1 | A | 0 / 2 | 0–2 | 0% |
| Miami | A | Q3 | A | 2R | 1R | QF | 2R | 3R | A | A | Q1 | A | 0 / 5 | 7–5 | 58% |
| Monte Carlo | Q1 | Q1 | A | A | A | SF | 2R | 3R | A | A | A | A | 0 / 3 | 7–3 | 70% |
| Hamburg | A | Q2 | A | Q1 | A | A | 2R | A | A | A | A | A | 0 / 1 | 1–1 | 50% |
| Rome | A | Q2 | A | 1R | 2R | 1R | 1R | A | A | A | A | A | 0 / 4 | 1–4 | 20% |
| Canada | A | A | A | 1R | A | A | QF | 3R | A | A | A | A | 0 / 3 | 5–3 | 63% |
| Cincinnati | A | 1R | A | 1R | 3R | A | 1R | 1R | A | A | A | A | 0 / 5 | 2–5 | 29% |
| Stuttgart | A | A | A | A | A | A | 1R | A | Not Held | | | | 0 / 1 | 0–1 | 0% |
| Paris | Q2 | 1R | Q1 | A | 3R | A | 1R | A | A | A | A | A | 0 / 3 | 2–3 | 40% |
| Win–loss | 0–0 | 0–3 | 0–0 | 1–4 | 5–4 | 7–3 | 6–9 | 6–4 | 0–0 | 0–0 | 0–0 | 0–0 | 0 / 27 | 25–27 | 48% |
