= John van Lottum =

Dutch tennis player

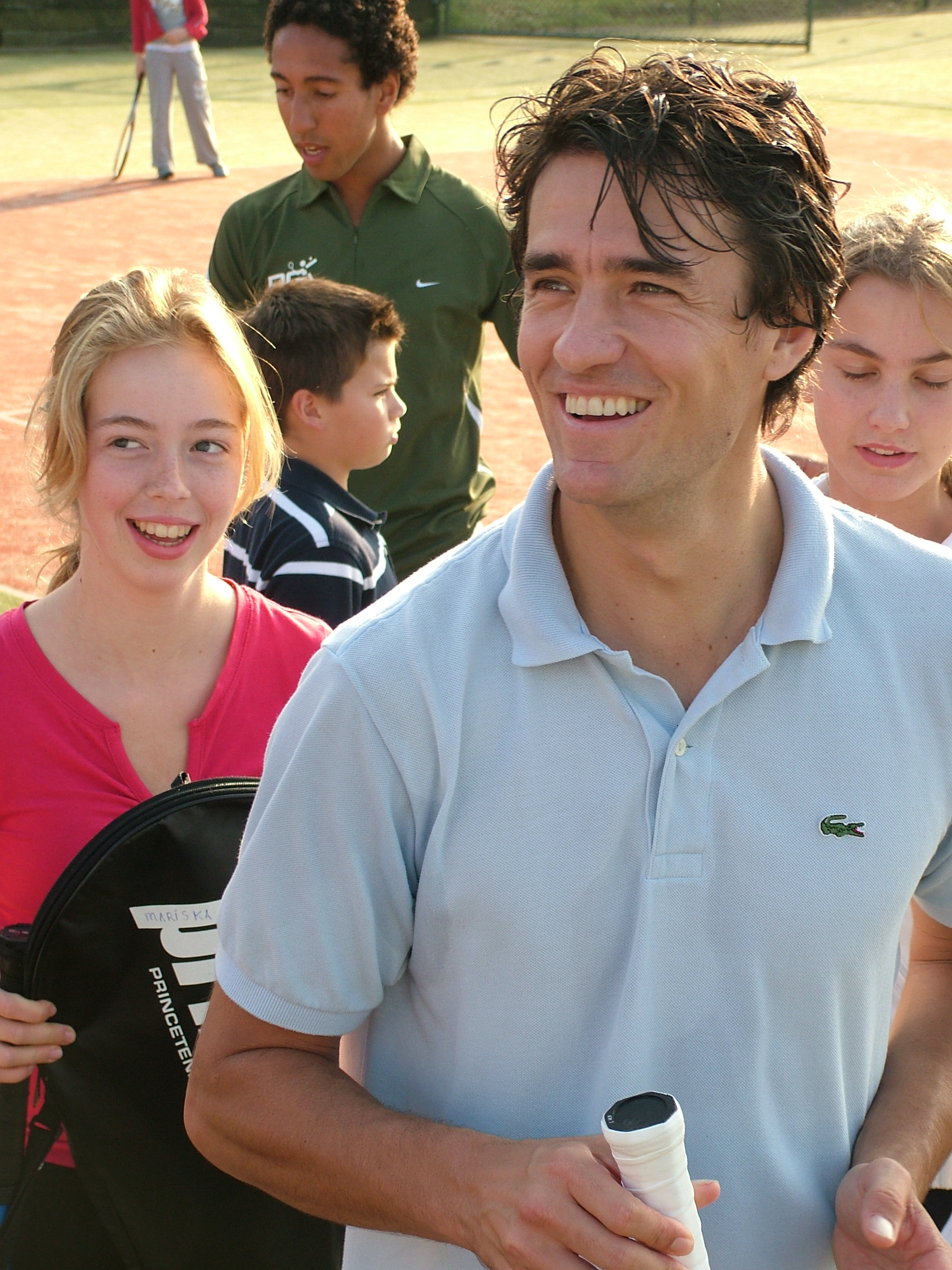
- Country (sports): Netherlands
- Residence: Antwerp, Belgium
- Born: 10 April 1976 (age 49) Antananarivo, Democratic Republic of Madagascar
- Height: 1.85 m (6 ft 1 in)
- Turned pro: 1994
- Retired: 2007
- Plays: Right-handed (2-handed backhand)
- Prize money: $1,188,163

Singles
- Career record: 62–99
- Career titles: 0
- Highest ranking: No. 62 (26 April 1999)

Grand Slam singles results
- Australian Open: 1R (1999, 2000, 2004)
- French Open: 2R (1998, 2003)
- Wimbledon: 4R (1998)
- US Open: 3R (1997, 1999)

Doubles
- Career record: 13–32
- Career titles: 0
- Highest ranking: No. 233 (27 January 2003)

Grand Slam doubles results
- Australian Open: 2R (2003)
- French Open: 2R (2004)
- US Open: 1R (2003)

John van Lottum (born 10 April 1976) is a former tennis player from the Netherlands, who played professionally from 1994 to 2007. During his career, he won 5 Challenger titles in singles; notably defeated Lleyton Hewitt and Todd Martin; and reached the 4th round of Wimbledon in 1998.

The right-hander reached his career-high singles ranking on the ATP Tour in April 1999, when he became world No. 62. He has an older sister, Noëlle van Lottum, who played on the WTA Tour for France circuit from 1987 to 1999, with a career-high ranking of world No. 57 in singles.

After his tennis career he was considered as a coach for Michaëlla Krajicek, but instead joined TV channel Eurosport as a tennis commentator. In June 2008, he coached Elena Dementieva during the Ordina Open and Wimbledon.

== Performance timeline ==
Key
W	F	SF	QF	#R	RR	Q#	DNQ	A	NH

(W) winner; (F) finalist; (SF) semifinalist; (QF) quarterfinalist; (#R) rounds 4, 3, 2, 1; (RR) round-robin stage; (Q#) qualification round; (DNQ) did not qualify; (A) absent; (NH) not held; (SR) strike rate (events won / competed); (W–L) win–loss record.

=== Singles ===
Tournament	1995	1996	1997	1998	1999	2000	2001	2002	2003	2004	2005	2006	SR	W–L	Win%
Grand Slam tournaments
Australian Open	A	A	A	Q1	1R	1R	A	Q1	Q2	1R	A	Q2	0 / 3	0–3	0%
French Open	A	A	A	2R	1R	1R	1R	Q2	2R	1R	A	Q2	0 / 6	2–6	25%
Wimbledon	A	A	3R	4R	1R	A	A	A	1R	1R	A	A	0 / 5	5–5	50%
US Open	Q1	A	3R	1R	3R	1R	1R	2R	2R	A	A	A	0 / 7	6–7	46%
Win–loss	0–0	0–0	4–2	4–3	2–4	0–3	0–2	1–1	2–3	0–3	0–0	0–0	0 / 21	13–21	38%
ATP Tour Masters 1000
Indian Wells	A	A	A	A	A	Q2	A	A	A	1R	A	A	0 / 1	0–1	0%
Miami	A	A	A	A	1R	1R	A	A	A	A	A	A	0 / 2	0–2	0%
Monte Carlo	A	A	A	A	2R	Q1	Q2	A	Q1	Q1	A	A	0 / 1	1–1	50%
Rome	A	A	A	Q2	1R	Q2	A	A	Q2	A	A	A	0 / 1	0–1	0%
Cincinnati Masters	A	A	A	A	2R	A	A	A	A	A	A	A	0 / 1	1–1	50%
Stuttgart	A	A	Q2	Q1	Q1	A	A	Not Held					0 / 0	0–0	–
Paris Masters	A	A	A	Q1	3R	A	A	A	A	A	A	A	0 / 1	2–1	67%
Win–loss	0–0	0–0	0–0	0–0	4–5	0–1	0–0	0–0	0–0	0–1	0–0	0–0	0 / 7	4–7	36%

== ATP Challenger and ITF Futures finals ==
=== Singles: 13 (5–8) ===
Legend ATP Challenger (5–8) ITF Futures (0–0)	Finals by surface Hard (4–4) Clay (0–2) Grass (0–0) Carpet (1–2)

Result	W–L	Date	Tournament	Tier	Surface	Opponent	Score
Loss	0–1	Nov 1997	Neumünster, Germany	Challenger	Carpet	(Belgium) Dick Norman	7–6, 6–7, 6–7
Win	1–1	Feb 1999	Ho Chi Minh City, Vietnam	Challenger	Hard	(Austria) Markus Hipfl	7–6, 6–2
Win	2–1	Mar 2001	Kyoto, Japan	Challenger	Carpet	(Germany) Michael Kohlmann	6–7^{(3–7)}, 6–4, 7–5
Win	3–1	Oct 2001	Bukhara, Uzbekistan	Challenger	Hard	(Uzbekistan) Oleg Ogorodov	6–1, 6–1
Loss	3–2	Dec 2001	San José, Costa Rica	Challenger	Hard	(Germany) Michael Kohlmann	3–6, 4–6
Loss	3–3	Dec 2001	Bangkok, Thailand	Challenger	Hard	(Thailand) Paradorn Srichaphan	2–6, 3–6
Loss	3–4	Sep 2002	Samarkand, Uzbekistan	Challenger	Clay	(Greece) Vasilis Mazarakis	6–7^{(1–7)}, 6–4, 1–6
Win	4–4	Oct 2002	Bukhara, Uzbekistan	Challenger	Hard	(Greece) Vasilis Mazarakis	7–6, 6–1
Loss	4–5	Dec 2002	Yokohama, Japan	Challenger	Carpet	(South Korea) Lee Hyung-taik	6–2, 6–7^{(2–7)}, 6–7^{(6–8)}
Win	5–5	Dec 2002	Bangkok, Thailand	Challenger	Hard	(Germany) Frank Moser	7–5, 6–4
Loss	5–6	Jul 2003	Hilversum, Netherlands	Challenger	Clay	(Netherlands) Martin Verkerk	3–6, 1–6
Loss	5–7	Nov 2003	Nottingham, United Kingdom	Challenger	Hard	(Sweden) Joachim Johansson	4–6, 7–6^{(7–4)}, 2–6
Loss	5–8	Nov 2003	Bratislava, Slovakia	Challenger	Hard	(Switzerland) Marc Rosset	6–3, 3–6, 0–6

=== Doubles: 2 (1–1) ===
Legend ATP Challenger (1–1) ITF Futures (0–0)	Finals by surface Hard (0–1) Clay (0–0) Grass (0–0) Carpet (1–0)

Result	W–L	Date	Tournament	Tier	Surface	Partner	Opponents	Score
Win	1–0	Jan 2000	Heilbronn, Germany	Challenger	Carpet	(Netherlands) Jan Siemerink	(Sweden) Magnus Larsson (Sweden) Fredrik Lovén	7–5, 7–6^{(8–6)}
Loss	1–1	Mar 2002	Osaka, Japan	Challenger	Hard	(Italy) Laurence Tieleman	(Slovakia) Karol Beck (France) Cedric Kauffmann	5–7, 1–6
