= 2000 Ericsson Open – Men's singles =

Men's singles
- 2000 Ericsson Open

Final
- Champion: (United States) Pete Sampras
- Runner-up: (Brazil) Gustavo Kuerten
- Score: 6–1, 6–7^{(2–7)}, 7–6^{(7–5)}, 7–6^{(10–8)}

Details
- Draw: 96 (12Q / 5WC)
- Seeds: 32

Events
Singles	men	women
Doubles	men	women
- Ericsson Open

Pete Sampras defeated Gustavo Kuerten in the final, 6–1, 6–7^{(2–7)}, 7–6^{(7–5)}, 7–6^{(10–8)} to win the men's singles tennis title at the 2000 Miami Open.

Richard Krajicek was the reigning champion, but did not participate this year.

This tournament marked the final professional appearance of former world No. 1 Jim Courier. He beat David Nalbandian in the first round before losing to Thomas Enqvist in the second round in three sets.

== Seeds ==
All thirty-two seeds received a bye to the second round.

1. (United States) Andre Agassi (semifinals)
2. (United States) Pete Sampras (champion)
3. (Russia) Yevgeny Kafelnikov (fourth round)
4. (Germany) Nicolas Kiefer (second round)
5. (Sweden) Magnus Norman (third round)
6. (Brazil) Gustavo Kuerten (final)
7. (Sweden) Thomas Enqvist (fourth round, withdrew)
8. (Chile) Marcelo Ríos (fourth round)
9. (Ecuador) Nicolás Lapentti (quarterfinals)
10. (United Kingdom) Tim Henman (quarterfinals)
11. (France) Cédric Pioline (third round)
12. (Spain) Álex Corretja (second round)
13. (Spain) Álbert Costa (second round)
14. (Australia) Lleyton Hewitt (semifinals)
15. (Australia) Patrick Rafter (fourth round)
16. (Morocco) Younes El Aynaoui (second round)
17. (United Kingdom) Greg Rusedski (fourth round)
18. (France) Sébastien Grosjean (third round)
19. (Germany) Tommy Haas (third round)
20. (Slovakia) Dominik Hrbatý (fourth round)
21. (Austria) Stefan Koubek (second round)
22. (Australia) Mark Philippoussis (fourth round)
23. (Argentina) Mariano Zabaleta (third round)
24. (Spain) Félix Mantilla (third round)
25. (Spain) Juan Carlos Ferrero (second round)
26. (France) Nicolas Escudé (third round)
27. (Morocco) Karim Alami (second round)
28. (United States) Vincent Spadea (second round)
29. (Morocco) Hicham Arazi (second round)
30. (Brazil) Fernando Meligeni (third round)
31. (France) Fabrice Santoro (second round)
32. (Russia) Marat Safin (second round)

== Draw ==
Key

- Q = Qualifier
- WC = Wild card
- LL = Lucky loser
- Alt = Alternate
- ITF = ITF entry
- PR = Protected ranking
- SR = Special ranking
- SE = Special exempt
- JE = Junior exempt
- JR = Junior Accelerator Programme entrant
- CO = College Accelerator Programme entrant
- NG = Next Gen Accelerator Program entrant
- w/o = Walkover
- r = Retired
- d = Defaulted

=== Finals ===
Quarterfinals
1	(United States) Andre Agassi	7	1	7^{12}
10	(United Kingdom) Tim Henman	5	6	6^{10}
(South Africa) Wayne Ferreira	3	1
6	(Brazil) Gustavo Kuerten	6	6
(United States) Jan-Michael Gambill	4	6^{3}
14	(Australia) Lleyton Hewitt	6	7^{7}
9	(Ecuador) Nicolás Lapentti	4	6^{3}
2	(United States) Pete Sampras	6	7^{7}

Semifinals
1	(United States) Andre Agassi	1	4
6	(Brazil) Gustavo Kuerten	6	6
14	(Australia) Lleyton Hewitt	3	6	1
2	(United States) Pete Sampras	6	3	6

Final
6	(Brazil) Gustavo Kuerten	1	7^{7}	6^{5}	6^{8}
2	(United States) Pete Sampras	6	6^{2}	7^{7}	7^{10}

=== Top half ===
==== Section 1 ====
First round
(Spain) F Vicente	4	0
WC	(United States) A Roddick	6	6
(Armenia) S Sargsian	1	3
(Romania) A Pavel	6	6
(Netherlands) S Schalken	6	6
(Austria) M Hipfl	3	1
(Belarus) M Mirnyi	6	3	6
(Sweden) M Tillström	1	6	4

Second round
1	(United States) A Agassi	6	6
WC	(United States) A Roddick	2	3
(Romania) A Pavel	6	4	7^{7}
31	(France) F Santoro	3	6	6^{5}
18	(France) S Grosjean	6	6
(Netherlands) S Schalken	4	3
(Belarus) M Mirnyi	4	2
15	(Australia) P Rafter	6	6

Third round
1	(United States) A Agassi	6	6
(Romania) A Pavel	4	3
18	(France) S Grosjean	6	4	3
15	(Australia) P Rafter	2	6	6

Fourth round
1	(United States) A Agassi	6	6
15	(Australia) P Rafter	4	4

==== Section 2 ====
First round
(Switzerland) M Rosset	7	3	6^{5}
Q	(Argentina) A Calleri	5	6	7^{7}
(Switzerland) R Federer	7	6
WC	(United States) J Gimelstob	5	3
Q	(Australia) W Arthurs	7	6
(Spain) F Clavet	5	3
(Costa Rica) J A Marín	3	4
(United States) M Chang	6	6

Second round
10	(United Kingdom) T Henman	6	6^{5}	6
Q	(Argentina) A Calleri	3	7^{7}	4
(Switzerland) R Federer	4	6^{7}
23	(Argentina) M Zabaleta	6	7^{9}
26	(France) N Escudé	6	6
Q	(Australia) W Arthurs	3	3
(United States) M Chang	4	4
8	(Chile) M Ríos	6	6

Third round
10	(United Kingdom) T Henman	6	6
23	(Argentina) M Zabaleta	3	3
26	(France) N Escudé	2	6	1
8	(Chile) M Ríos	6	3	6

Fourth round
10	(United Kingdom) T Henman	6	1	7^{7}
8	(Chile) M Ríos	1	6	6^{4}

==== Section 3 ====
First round
(United States) J Tarango	6^{5}	6	5
(Australia) R Fromberg	7^{7}	4	7
(South Africa) W Ferreira	4	6	6
Q	(Czech Republic) M Damm	6	1	4
(Belgium) C Rochus	4	6	6
(Argentina) F Squillari	6	3	4
Q	(Switzerland) M Kratochvil	6	6
(Netherlands) J van Lottum	3	3

Second round
4	(Germany) N Kiefer	4	4
(Australia) R Fromberg	6	6
(South Africa) W Ferreira	7	6
29	(Morocco) H Arazi	5	3
20	(Slovakia) D Hrbatý	6	6
(Belgium) C Rochus	1	1
Q	(Switzerland) M Kratochvil	3	7^{7}	6
13	(Spain) Á Costa	6	6^{2}	3

Third round
(Australia) R Fromberg	3	4
(South Africa) W Ferreira	6	6
20	(Slovakia) D Hrbatý	7^{7}	7^{10}
Q	(Switzerland) M Kratochvil	6^{2}	6^{8}

Fourth round
(South Africa) W Ferreira	2	6	6
20	(Slovakia) D Hrbatý	6	4	4

==== Section 4 ====
First round
(Czech Republic) J Novák	6	6
(Spain) A Martín	2	4
Q	(Italy) G Pozzi	0	7^{7}	6
(Sweden) J Björkman	6	6^{3}	3
(Croatia) G Ivanišević	6	6
(Germany) D Prinosil	3	2
(United States) C Woodruff	4	6	4
(France) A Clément	6	3	6

Second round
12	(Spain) Á Corretja	7^{7}	1	1
(Czech Republic) J Novák	6^{4}	6	6
Q	(Italy) G Pozzi	7^{8}	6
21	(Austria) S Koubek	6^{6}	1
28	(United States) V Spadea	5	2
(Croatia) G Ivanišević	7	6
(France) A Clément	7^{7}	6^{4}	5
6	(Brazil) G Kuerten	6^{5}	7^{7}	7

Third round
(Czech Republic) J Novák	3	5
Q	(Italy) G Pozzi	6	7
(Croatia) G Ivanišević	6^{4}	3
6	(Brazil) G Kuerten	7^{7}	6

Fourth round
Q	(Italy) G Pozzi	4	6^{3}
6	(Brazil) G Kuerten	6	7^{7}

=== Bottom half ===
==== Section 5 ====
First round
Q	(Chile) N Massú	6	4	6
(France) A Di Pasquale	4	6	0
(United States) J-M Gambill	6	6
(Czech Republic) S Doseděl	4	1
Q	(France) C Saulnier	4	6	7
(Sweden) T Johansson	6	3	5
(Spain) A Berasategui	4	1
Q	(Zimbabwe) W Black	6	6

Second round
5	(Sweden) M Norman	6	6
Q	(Chile) N Massú	4	0
(United States) J-M Gambill	6	5	6
27	(Morocco) K Alami	4	7	1
22	(Australia) M Philippoussis	4	6	6
Q	(France) C Saulnier	6	3	4
Q	(Zimbabwe) W Black	6^{3}	3
11	(France) C Pioline	7^{7}	6

Third round
5	(Sweden) M Norman	3	6	3
(United States) J-M Gambill	6	3	6
22	(Australia) M Philippoussis	6	7^{7}
11	(France) C Pioline	4	6^{3}

Fourth round
(United States) J-M Gambill	6	6^{6}	6
22	(Australia) M Philippoussis	2	7^{8}	3

==== Section 6 ====
First round
(Argentina) H Gumy	3	3
(Argentina) G Gaudio	6	6
WC	(United States) M Fish	6	0	4
(Spain) G Blanco	4	6	1^{r}
WC	(United States) P Goldstein	6	6
(Norway) C Ruud	2	1
(Argentina) G Cañas	6	7
(Croatia) I Ljubičić	4	5

Second round
14	(Australia) L Hewitt	7^{7}	6^{6}	6
(Argentina) G Gaudio	6^{4}	7^{8}	3
WC	(United States) M Fish	2	1
19	(Germany) T Haas	6	6
30	(Brazil) F Meligeni	7	7^{7}
WC	(United States) P Goldstein	5	6^{5}
(Argentina) G Cañas	3	6	4
3	(Russia) Y Kafelnikov	6	4	6

Third round
14	(Australia) L Hewitt	6	6
19	(Germany) T Haas	1	3
30	(Brazil) F Meligeni	4	3
3	(Russia) Y Kafelnikov	6	6

Fourth round
14	(Australia) L Hewitt	6	6
3	(Russia) Y Kafelnikov	4	3

==== Section 7 ====
First round
(United States) J Courier	6	3	7
Q	(Argentina) D Nalbandian	3	6	5
(Switzerland) G Bastl	6	6
Q	(Finland) T Ketola	4	4
(Czech Republic) D Vacek	4	2
(France) J Golmard	6	6
(Sweden) M Larsson	4	3
Q	(Belgium) X Malisse	6	6

Second round
7	(Sweden) T Enqvist	6^{5}	6	6
(United States) J Courier	7^{7}	3	4
(Switzerland) G Bastl	7^{7}	6
25	(Spain) J C Ferrero	6^{1}	4
24	(Spain) F Mantilla	3	7^{7}	6
(France) J Golmard	6	6^{5}	2
Q	(Belgium) X Malisse	4	4
9	(Ecuador) N Lapentti	6	6

Third round
7	(Sweden) T Enqvist	6	7^{7}
(Switzerland) G Bastl	0	6^{3}
24	(Spain) F Mantilla	7	1	1
9	(Ecuador) N Lapentti	5	6	6

Fourth round
7	(Sweden) T Enqvist
9	(Ecuador) N Lapentti	w/o

==== Section 8 ====
First round
(Germany) R Schüttler	3	5
(Zimbabwe) B Black	6	7
(Ukraine) A Medvedev	7	6
(Australia) A Ilie	5	2
WC	(Sweden) A Vinciguerra	6	6
(Slovakia) K Kučera	1	3
Q	(Spain) J A Viloca	4	2
(Spain) C Moyà	6	6

Second round
16	(Morocco) Y El Aynaoui	3	6	1
(Zimbabwe) B Black	6	1	6
(Ukraine) A Medvedev	4	5
17	(United Kingdom) G Rusedski	6	7
32	(Russia) M Safin	6	1	2
WC	(Sweden) A Vinciguerra	1	6	6
(Spain) C Moyà	1	4
2	(United States) P Sampras	6	6

Third round
(Zimbabwe) B Black	1	6^{4}
17	(United Kingdom) G Rusedski	6	7^{7}
WC	(Sweden) A Vinciguerra	7	6^{3}	4
2	(United States) P Sampras	5	7^{7}	6

Fourth round
17	(United Kingdom) G Rusedski	3	3
2	(United States) P Sampras	6	6
