= 2000 Gold Flake Open – Doubles =

Doubles
- 2000 Gold Flake Open

Final
- Champions: (France) Julien Boutter (Belgium) Christophe Rochus
- Runners-up: (India) Srinath Prahlad (India) Saurav Panja
- Score: 7–5, 6–1

Events
Singles	Doubles
← 1999 ·	Gold Flake Open	· 2001 →

Mahesh Bhupathi and Leander Paes were the defending champions, but Bhupathi did not participate this year. Paes partnered Byron Black, losing in the quarterfinals.

Julien Boutter and Christophe Rochus won in the final 7–5, 6–1, against Srinath Prahlad and Saurav Panja.

== Seeds ==
1. (Zimbabwe) Byron Black / (India) Leander Paes (quarterfinals)
2. (Czech Republic) Martin Damm / (Russia) Yevgeny Kafelnikov (quarterfinals)
3. (Israel) Noam Behr / (Israel) Eyal Ran (first round)
4. (Spain) Álex López Morón / (Italy) Davide Sanguinetti (first round)

== Draw ==
=== Key ===
- Q = Qualifier
- WC = Wild card
- LL = Lucky loser
- Alt = Alternate
- SE = Special exempt
- PR = Protected ranking
- ITF = ITF entry
- JE = Junior exempt
- w/o = Walkover
- r = Retired
- d = Defaulted
- SR = Special ranking

=== Draw ===
First round
1	(Zimbabwe) B Black (India) L Paes	6	7^{8}
(Netherlands) S Groen (Italy) L Tieleman	3	6^{6}
WC	(France) J Boutter (Belgium) C Rochus	6	6
(India) N Kirtane (India) S Kirtane	2	1
4	(Spain) Á López Morón (Italy) D Sanguinetti	6^{3}	2
WC	(France) J Golmard (Slovakia) J Krošlák	7^{7}	6
(Czech Republic) M Tabara (Czech Republic) T Zíb	6	6
(Australia) P Kilderry (Switzerland) L Manta	4	3
WC	(India) S Prahlad (India) S Panja	6	6
(Israel) A Ram (India) F Syed	4	4
Q	(Russia) K Ivanov-Smolensky (Bulgaria) O Stanoytchev	6	7^{7}
3	(Israel) N Behr (Israel) E Ran	2	6^{2}
(India) M Ghouse (India) V Uppal	2	5
(Finland) T Ketola (Uzbekistan) O Ogorodov	6	7
(United Kingdom) B Cowan (United Kingdom) J Delgado	4	6^{5}
2	(Czech Republic) M Damm (Russia) Y Kafelnikov	6	7^{7}

Quarterfinals
1	(Zimbabwe) B Black (India) L Paes	3	4
WC	(France) J Boutter (Belgium) C Rochus	6	6
WC	(France) J Golmard (Slovakia) J Krošlák	6	4	6
(Czech Republic) M Tabara (Czech Republic) T Zíb	4	6	3
WC	(India) S Prahlad (India) S Panja	6	3	7^{7}
Q	(Russia) K Ivanov-Smolensky (Bulgaria) O Stanoytchev	4	6	6^{3}
(Finland) T Ketola (Uzbekistan) O Ogorodov	7	1	6
2	(Czech Republic) M Damm (Russia) Y Kafelnikov	5	6	3

Semifinals
WC	(France) J Boutter (Belgium) C Rochus	6^{5}	6	6
WC	(France) J Golmard (Slovakia) J Krošlák	7^{7}	3	4
WC	(India) S Prahlad (India) S Panja	6	2	7^{7}
(Finland) T Ketola (Uzbekistan) O Ogorodov	3	6	6^{4}

Final
WC	(France) J Boutter (Belgium) C Rochus	7	6
WC	(India) S Prahlad (India) S Panja	5	1
