= 2000 Gold Flake Open – Singles =

Tennis tournament

Singles
- 2000 Gold Flake Open

Final
- Champion: (France) Jérôme Golmard
- Runner-up: (Germany) Markus Hantschk
- Score: 6–3, 6–7^{(6–8)}, 6–3

Details
- Draw: 32
- Seeds: 8

Events
Singles	Doubles
← 1999 ·	Gold Flake Open	· 2001 →

Jérôme Golmard defeated Markus Hantschk 6–3, 6–7^{(6–8)}, 6–3 to win the 2000 Chennai Open singles event. Byron Black was the defending champion but lost in the first round to Jamie Delgado.

== Seeds ==
1. (Russia) Yevgeny Kafelnikov (first round)
2. (France) Cédric Pioline (semifinals)
3. (Spain) ~~Carlos Moyá~~ (withdrew)
4. (France) Jérôme Golmard (champion)
5. (Zimbabwe) Byron Black (first round)
6. (Italy) Laurence Tieleman (first round)
7. (Haiti) Ronald Agénor (second round)
8. (Sweden) Andreas Vinciguerra (second round)

== Draw ==
=== Key ===
- Q = Qualifier
- WC = Wild card
- LL = Lucky loser
- Alt = Alternate
- SE = Special exempt
- PR = Protected ranking
- ITF = ITF entry
- JE = Junior exempt
- w/o = Walkover
- r = Retired
- d = Defaulted
- SR = Special ranking

=== Finals ===
Semifinals
(Czech Republic) Martin Damm	6	3	3
4	(France) Jérôme Golmard	3	6	6
(Germany) Markus Hantschk	6	3	7^{7}
2	(France) Cédric Pioline	4	6	6^{5}

Final
4	(France) Jérôme Golmard	6	6^{6}	6
(Germany) Markus Hantschk	3	7^{8}	3

=== Section 1 ===
First round
1	(Russia) Y Kafelnikov	4	2
(Czech Republic) M Tabara	6	6
(Czech Republic) T Zíb	5	2
(Switzerland) L Manta	7	6
(Belgium) C Rochus	3	0
(Czech Republic) M Damm	6	6
WC	(India) S Kumar	4	4
7	(Haiti) R Agénor	6	6
4	(France) J Golmard	6	6
Q	(Austria) M Spöttl	3	4
(Sweden) F Jonsson	6	6
(Slovakia) J Krošlák	3	3
(Bulgaria) O Stanoytchev	6	7^{7}
WC	(Australia) P Kilderry	4	6^{4}
Q	(United Kingdom) J Delgado	6	7^{7}
5	(Zimbabwe) B Black	2	6^{4}

Second round
(Czech Republic) M Tabara	4	3
(Switzerland) L Manta	6	6
(Czech Republic) M Damm	4	6	6
7	(Haiti) R Agénor	6	2	1
4	(France) J Golmard	6	6
(Sweden) F Jonsson	2	3
(Bulgaria) O Santoytchev	6	2	3
Q	(United Kingdom) J Delgado	4	6	6

Quarterfinals
(Switzerland) L Manta	4	4
(Czech Republic) M Damm	6	6
4	(France) J Golmard	6	6
Q	(United Kingdom) J Delgado	3	4

Semifinals
(Czech Republic) M Damm	6	3	3
4	(France) J Golmard	3	6	6

=== Section 2 ===
First round
6	(Italy) L Tieleman	6^{2}	3
(Germany) M Hantschk	7^{7}	6
(Germany) T Behrend	6	4	6
(Germany) A Popp	4	6	1
Q	(Japan) Y Ishii	3	4
LL	(Czech Republic) J Vaněk	6	6
(Uzbekistan) O Ogorodov	5	6	4
LL	(Finland) T Ketola	7	4	6
8	(Sweden) A Vinciguerra	6	6
(Spain) Á López Morón	4	2
(Italy) D Sanguinetti	7^{9}	6
(Romania) A Voinea	6^{7}	4
WC	(India) L Paes	6	7^{8}
(France) J Boutter	4	6^{6}
Q	(Israel) A Ram	3	1
2	(France) C Pioline	6	6

Second round
(Germany) M Hantschk	6	4	6
(Germany) T Behrend	3	6	3
LL	(Czech Republic) J Vaněk	6	4	4
LL	(Finland) T Ketola	4	6	6
8	(Sweden) A Vinciguerra	6	5	3
(Italy) D Sanguinetti	2	7	6
WC	(India) L Paes	3	4
2	(France) C Pioline	6	6

Quarterfinals
(Germany) M Hantschk	5	7	6
LL	(Finland) T Ketola	7	5	2
(Italy) D Sanguinetti	6	4	6^{3}
2	(France) C Pioline	3	6	7^{7}

Semifinals
(Germany) M Hantschk	6	3	7^{7}
2	(France) C Pioline	4	6	6^{5}
