= Rohan Bopanna =

Indian tennis player (born 1980)

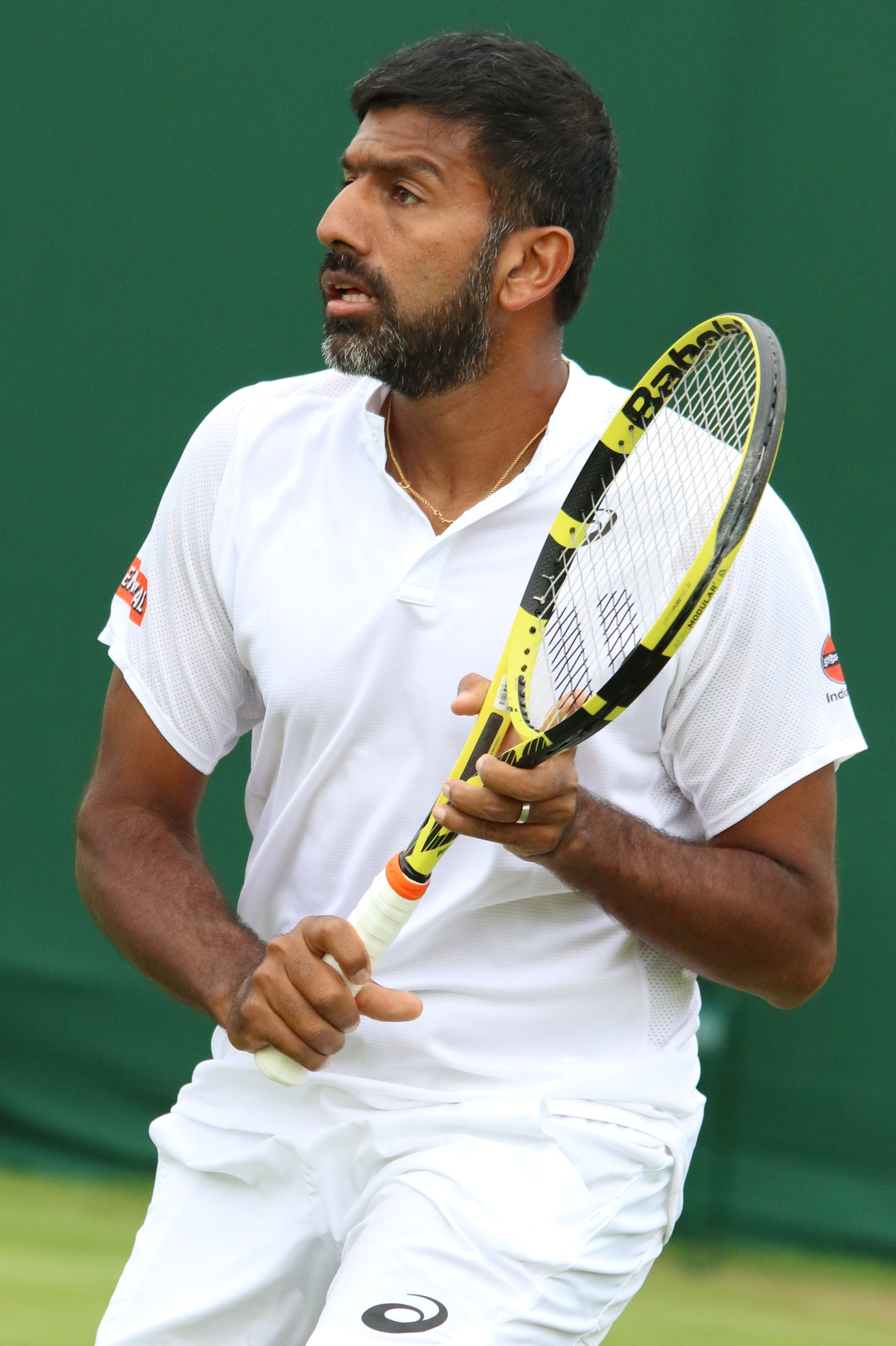
- Bopanna at the 2019 Wimbledon Championships
- Full name: Rohan Machanda Bopanna
- Country (sports): India
- Born: 4 March 1980 (age 46) Bangalore, Karnataka, India
- Height: 1.93 m (6 ft 4 in)
- Turned pro: 2003
- Retired: 1 November 2025
- Plays: Right-handed (one-handed backhand)
- Prize money: $7,455,122

Singles
- Career record: 15–33
- Career titles: 0
- Highest ranking: No. 213 (23 July 2008)

Grand Slam singles results
- Australian Open: Q2 (2006, 2007, 2008)
- French Open: Q1 (2006)
- Wimbledon: Q2 (2006)
- US Open: Q2 (2007)

Doubles
- Career record: 539–410
- Career titles: 26
- Highest ranking: No. 1 (29 January 2024)

Grand Slam doubles results
- Australian Open: W (2024)
- French Open: SF (2022, 2024)
- Wimbledon: SF (2013, 2015, 2023)
- US Open: F (2010, 2023)

Other doubles tournaments
- Tour Finals: F (2012, 2015)
- Olympic Games: 2R (2012)

Mixed doubles
- Career record: 55–42
- Career titles: 1

Grand Slam mixed doubles results
- Australian Open: F (2018, 2023)
- French Open: W (2017)
- Wimbledon: QF (2011, 2012, 2013, 2017)
- US Open: SF (2015, 2024)

Other mixed doubles tournaments
- Olympic Games: SF – 4th (2016)

Team competitions
- Davis Cup: 23–27 (singles 10–17, doubles 13–10)
- Hopman Cup: 6–6 (singles 0–6, doubles 6–0)
Medal record
Men's tennis
Representing India
Asian Games
| Gold medal – first place | 2018 Palembang | Doubles |
| Gold medal – first place | 2022 Hangzhou | Mixed doubles |
Afro-Asian Games
| Gold medal – first place | 2003 Hyderabad | Doubles |
| Gold medal – first place | 2003 Hyderabad | Team |

Rohan Machanda Bopanna (/bəˈpɑːnə/ bə-PAHN-ə; born 4 March 1980) is an Indian former tennis player who specialized in doubles. He attained the world No. 1 ranking after winning his first major men's doubles title at the 2024 Australian Open with Matthew Ebden, becoming the oldest first-time No. 1 at the age of 43. He plays as the marquee player for SG Pipers in the Tennis Premier League.

Bopanna had a partnership with Aisam-ul-Haq Qureshi of Pakistan for several years, with the pair known as the IndoPak Express. They were runners-up at the 2010 US Open. Bopanna was a finalist at the ATP World Tour Finals in 2012 and 2015 with different partners. He has won two major titles in doubles: at the 2017 French Open mixed doubles alongside Gabriela Dabrowski (becoming the fourth Indian major winner after Mahesh Bhupathi, Leander Paes and Sania Mirza) and the 2024 Australian Open men's doubles alongside Matthew Ebden, becoming the oldest major winner in the Open Era in the latter.

Bopanna also reached major finals at the 2018 and 2023 Australian Opens in mixed doubles; and in the 2023 US Open men's doubles. He has also reached the final of every Masters 1000 tournament at least once. Bopanna has also won 26 doubles titles on the ATP Tour, including six at the Masters 1000 level, with a title at the 2024 Miami Open making him the oldest Masters winner.

Bopanna was a member of the Indian Davis Cup team from 2002 to 2023, and he competed at the 2012, 2016, and 2024 Olympic Games.

== Early life ==
Bopanna has been playing tennis since he was 11. His father is a coffee planter and his mother is a housewife.

== Tennis career ==
=== 1996: First Junior Tournament ===
Bopanna entered his 1st ever ITF Junior tournament which was India ITF Junior World Ranking Event 1996. He won his singles 1st round match against Girish Ramchandani in straight sets. This was his 1st win in the junior level on his 1st appearance. But he lost his next match in straight sets to Yeni Sandeep in straight sets. In the doubles, he partnered Akshay Jagdale where they lost in straight sets to Harsh Mankad and Rishi Sridhar.

=== 1997: First Junior Title ===
Bopanna started the year at Indian ITF Junior Tournament 1 where he had qualified for main draw by getting a bye and beating compatriots Vivek Bhakuni, Nikhil Murali and Arjun Shetty respectively all in straight sets. But he lost in the first round to Vijayendra Laad. In the doubles he partnered Samrat Bhasin but they also lost in 1st round to Austrians Christoph Haid and Hubert Suppan in straight sets. Bopanna won the 1st Arab Championships with Rohan Saikia. This was his 1st ever Junior Level Title. He then won Arab Contractors International Junior Championships with Rohan Saikia.

He and Rohan then made it to the semifinals of Kuwait Junior Open where they lost in a high tense match to pair of German Airan Kiebel and Pakistani Syed Nasir AliSherazi 4–6,7–6, 4–6. He ended the year at Duncans ITF Junior World Tennis Championships where he had a second round exit in singles losing to Tembe Kedar and in doubles he partnered with Vijayendra Laad where they lost at semifinals to top seeds and eventual winners Indo-Brit pair of Manoj Mahadevan and James Auckland in straight sets. He achieved his highest ITF Junior Ranking of 601 on 31 December.

=== 1998–99: Last Junior Tournaments and Turning Professional ===
Bopanna started the year by winning Indian ITF Junior Tournament 1 with Bhatt Ravikiran. In the next tournament which was Indian ITF Junior Tournament 2, they were top seeds but got ousted by Saif Ali and Vijay Kannan in first round. He retired in quarterfinals of singles to Vijay Kannan in first set. At Namangan International Junior Tournament, he lost in first round to Sergei Pozdnev in straight sets, he was top seed in doubles with Denis Surotin where easily won their first round in straight sets but lost in quarterfinals. He again had a first round exit in singles at 18th Tashkent International Junior Tournament where he lost to 8th seeded Denis Kurmatov in straight sets but reached semifinals of doubles with Sergei Pozdnev where they lost to 2nd seeds in straight sets. He then again reached semifinals of EA-Generali-Cup with Bhatt Ravikiran where they again lost to 2nd seeds in straight sets. But his bad form in the singles continued as be failed to qualify for main draw after losing to Andreas Reinsprecht in second round after receiving bye in first round as he was seeded 3rd.

He again reached semifinals with Bhatt Ravikiran at ITF Frankfurt Championships where they lost in straight sets. This was his third consecutive semifinal appearance in doubles. He lost to David Sanger in straight sets in final qualifier round of LTA International Junior Championships. But still received entry in main draw as a lucky loser but his luck didn't continued as he lost to Ignacio Gonzalez-King in straight sets of first round. He entered 42nd Van Keeken Tournament where he lost in singles to Julien Cassaigne in straight sets. In the doubles he was seeded 4th with Bhatt Ravikiran where they lost in quarterfinals to Jonas Froberg and Alexander Hartman in straight sets. This was Bopanna's junior Career's last tournament he entered.

Bopanna had a very poor performances in early phase of his senior career. He managed to reach finals of India 2 Masters week 2 with Kedar Shah where they lost in straight sets. Many times his singles campaign ended in qualifying rounds and doubles in quarterfinals.

He ended the 20th century at Jaipur Challenger where he lost to top seed Paradorn Srichaphan in straight sets in first round and in doubles he reached quarterfinals with Rishi Sridhar where they lost to 3rd seeds Slovaks Martin Hromec and Vladimir Platenik in a thrilling match 6–7,7–6,6–7.

=== 2000–01: Professional beginnings ===
Bopanna had started entering ITF Circuit Tournaments but didn't get much success as many times his campaign ended in qualifying rounds or first and second rounds of main draw. He had only some occasional semifinals and finals appearances in this period. Bopanna began the 21st century at 2000 Gold Flake Open where he lost to Denis Golovanov in straight sets in first round of qualifiers. He entered India F1 Futures where he lost to Mikhail Chadunel in 2nd round of singles after receiving bye in first round. In doubles he partnered Rishi Sridhar but they lost to Mustafa Ghouse and Vishal Uppal in first round. He then reached semifinals of India F3 Futures with Rishi Sridhar where they lost to Andy Ram and Nir Welgreen and in singles lost to Ganesh Sundararaju in straight sets in 2nd round after receiving bye un first. He ended the year at India F6 Futures where reached quarterfinals with Vijay Kannan but lost to Viktor Bruthans in singles 2nd round.

He started the year by reaching quarterfinals of India F1 Futures with Vijay Kannan. He reached semifinals of India F2 and F3 Futures with Vijay Kannan where both times they lost in straight sets and both he had a first round exit in singles. He reached the finals of India F4 Futures in both singles and doubles. In singles, he lost to Srinath Prahlad in straight sets. This was his first ITF Circuit final. In doubles, he again lost to Prahlad and Ajay Ramaswami in straight sets partnering Vijay Kannan. He then reached the finals of India F5 Futures where he again lost to Srinath Prahlad in straight sets. He then lost to Eyal Erlich in singles semifinals of India F6 Futures. He ended 2002 season by entering Australia F6 Futures where he had first round exit in singles by Todd Reid in straight sets and reached wuarterfinals in doubles with Ronald Rugimbana.

=== 2002: Success at ITF Circuit, Davis Cup and Asian Games Debut ===
Bopanna had a good success at ITF futures level in 2002. He won the UAE F2 Futures with his Taiwanese partner Lu Yen-hsun. This was his 1st Futures title. He then won the Sri Lanka F1 Futures with compatriot Vijay Kannan. He then won India F2 Futures by defeating Dmitri Mazur 7–5,5–7,6–4. He also won the doubles with Vijay Kannan. He then won the India F5 Futures both singles and doubles with Vijay Kannan. He made his Davis Cup debut in the World Group qualifying match against Australia. He lost his singles match against Scott Draper 3–6,5–7. Eventually India lost the tie in a 0–5 clean sweep. He was selected for 2002 Asian Games. In the singles, he was seeded 11th but he lost to 3rd seed and eventual bronze medallist Takao Suzuki of Japan 5–7,2–6 in the pre-quarters. In the team event, he won his singles and doubles match with Sunil-Kumar Sipaeya as India easily beat Timor-Leste to enter quarterfinals. But in the quarterfinals he lost his important singles match as India lost to Uzbekistan 3–0. He entered Tata Open as a wildcard with his Spanish partner Carlos Cuadrado but they lost in the 1st round in straight sets to Jaroslav Levinský and David Škoch. This was his first ever appearance at main draw of any ATP Tour tournament.

=== 2003: 1st Challenger Series Title ===
Bopanna started the season at Tata Open where he entered the main draw as a wildcard but he lost in 1st round to Željko Krajan in straight sets. Bopanna was selected for Davis Cup tie against Japan. Bopanna defeated Jun Kato in one hour 54 minutes for his first win in Davis Cup. India defeated Japan 4–1 in the Asia-Oceania Group I Davis Cup tie. In the next tie against New Zealand, Bopanna went down to Alistair Hunt in a gruelling five setter. But he won his next singles match against James Shortall in straight sets as India won the tie 4–1 to qualify for world group play-offs.

He won the Denver Challenger with his Pakistani partner Aisam-ul-Haq Qureshi where they were the top seeds. This was his first ATP Challenger Series title(now known as ATP Challenger Tour). Before Denver they have reached the semi-finals of Manchester Trophy. He then won Indonesia F1 Futures title where he defeated Febi Wediyanto in the final.

In the Davis Cup World Group Play-off tie against Netherlands, Bopanna lost his singles match against Martin Verkerk. In the important doubles match, he and Mahesh Bhupathi lost to John van Lottum and Martin Verkerk. India were clean sweep 5–0 by Holland in the tie.

Bopanna won 2 gold medals at Afro-Asian Games. In the doubles, he partnered Mahesh Bhupathi where they defeated Adelo Abadia and Johnny Arcilla of Philippines in semi-finals in straight sets. Then, compatriots Sunil-Kumar Sipaeya and Vinod Sridhar in the gold medal match. In the team event, Bopanna put India on 1–0 lead in the gold medal tie with a run-away win over Rotimi Jegede before Prakash Amritraj overcame Sunday Maku, the top ranked Nigerian, to carve out a victory. In the doubles match, Vijay Kannan and Vishal Uppal blew away Balalola Abdul and Maku as India defeated Nigeria 3–0 in the gold medal match.

=== 2004–05: More Futures Titles and Struggle with Injuries ===
Bopanna was out for 8 weeks due to a bicep injury which made him miss 2004 Chennai Open and Davis Cup tie against New Zealand. He started off the season at India F1A Futures where he lost to Alexey Kedryuk in straight sets and in doubles he was 3rd seed with Vijay Kannan but they lost to Rupesh Roy and Divij Sharan. He won the Kuwait F1 Futures tournament with Mustafa Ghouse. In singles, he reached semi-finals where he lost to the top seed and eventual winner Filip Prpic in straight sets. Before an early end to the season he lastly played at São Paulo Challenger 2 where qualified for main draw after beating Brazilians Alexandre Bonatto, Frederico Casaro and Eduardo Bohrer respectively in straight sets. He again defeated a Brazilian Marcos Daniel in 1st round but he retired in 2nd round match after losing the first set. In doubles he had a first round exit with Mustafa Ghouse.

Bopanna was then out for almost 9 months due to a career threatening shoulder injury for which he had necessitated a surgery. He made his return at India F3 Futures where he was ousted in first round by Chris Kwon in straight sets. In the doubles he was fourth seed with Vijay Kannan where lost in the quarterfinals. But he won India F4 Futures with Vijay. His impressive show in the US$10,000 ITF Sri Lanka F1 Futures ended in anti-climax as he lost in the singles final in straight sets to German Peter Mayer-Tischer to finish runner-up in the clay court event. He then lost to Florin Mergea in straight sets of Kuwait F1 Futures. His disappointment was compoundeded by his loss in the doubles final. In an all-Indian final, he paired with Vijay Kannan but they went down to Vishal Uppal and Ashutosh Singh.

In the Davis Cup World Group Play-off tie against Sweden, he lost his singles match against Thomas Johansson in straight sets. India lost the tie 3–1. The non-playing captain Mats Wilander later reported that Bopanna twisted his left ankle while going for a return of serve, resulting in a torn tendon and would be out of action for three weeks. He reached the finals of Bukhara Challenger with Kyu-Tae Im, he also reached semi-finals in singles where he lost to eventual champion and 3rd seed Denis Istomin in straight sets. He lost to Bart Beks in straight sets at Seoul Challenger. In the doubles he partnered Korean Kyu-Tae Im where they lost to eventual winners Alexander Peya and Bjorn Phau. He lost in the semi-finals of Australia F10 and F11 Futures both times to Australian Luke Bourgeois. In the doubles he was 2nd seed in both tournaments with Romanian Horia Tecau they lost in the final to Australian pair of Carsten Ball and Andrew Coelho in an intense final and in the quarterfinals of the latter one in straight sets. He ended the year at India F7 Futures losing to his occasional partner and eventual winner Aisam-ul-Haq Qureshi.

=== 2006: First ATP Final and Asian Hopman Cup Title ===
The 2006 season was statistically a rising season of Bopanna's career. He started the season by qualifying for main draw of Chennai Open by defeating Marcin Matkowski, Danai Udomchoke and Rajeev Ram in straight sets respectively. He then defeated Cyril Saulnier in first round of main draw in straight sets. But lost to fifth seeded Gilles Müller in straight sets. He entered doubles as a wildcard with Prakash Amritraj where they upset 3rd seeds Yves Allegro and Michael Kohlmann in straight sets in first round, received bye in second round and then upset 2nd seeds Rainer Schüttler and Alexander Waske in semi-finals. But lost to Michal Mertiňák and Petr Pála in straight sets. This was his first ever ATP Tour final. He then made his Grand Slam at 2006 Australian Open where he participated in only men's singles event that too in qualifying round. He defeated Yohny Romero in straight sets in the first round. This was his first ever Grand slam match and first ever win at any grand slam. But his run ended in the second round where he lost to Jean-Christophe Faurel.

In the Davis cup tie against South Korea, he lost his first singles match to Chung Hee-seok after a valiant fight. But he also lost his reverse singles match in straight sets to Lee Hyung-taik. India lost to South Korea 4–1. He then had first round exit at Australian F1 Futures losing to Andrew Coelho and reached quarterfinals with Luke Bourgeois where they lost in a close match. At the Kyoto Challenger, he defeated Phillip King in straight sets but lost to Prakash Amritraj in straight sets in second round. In doubles, he lost in the finals with Prakash to Jonathan Murray and Alun Jones in a high thrilling match. He and Prakash then were second seeds at the Samsung Challenger in Ho Chi Minh City where they lost in the semi-finals to Dudi Sela and Jacob Adaktusson in straight sets and in the singles he lost in first round to Nicolas Devilder in straight sets. He again had a first round exit at UAE F1 Futures and in doubles he had to give walkover in first round as his partner Prakash was injured.

In davis cup tie against Pakistan he lost to his occasional partner Aisam-ul-Haq Qureshi in straight sets. But wins of Prakash Amritraj, Leander Paes and Mahesh Bhupathi secured the victory for India 3–2 against Pakistan. He then had 2 consecutive 2nd round exits at Chikmagalur and Dharwad Challenger losing to Toshihide Matsui and Viktor Troicki in straight sets. Almost the same scenario followed in doubles where ge had 3 consecutive quarterfinals at Chikmagalur, Dharwad and Fergana Challenger. He had lost to Dawid Olejniczak in straight sets of Fergana Challenger. He lost to Dawid Olejniczak in straight sets. He lost to Michael Lammer in straight sets in first qualifying round of French Open. This was his maiden French Open appearance. He had first round exits at Surbiton Trophy in both singles and doubles with Nathan Healey. He qualified for main draw of Halle Open by beating Evgeny Korolev, Simone Bolelli and Kristian Pless. He faced that time world no.1 Roger Federer in first round of main draw. It was his first ever match against Federer. He lost in straight sets. Federer went on to win the title. This remains his only match against any member of Big Three.

He then entered Wimbledon where in men's singles qualifying round he defeated Tomáš Cakl in straight sets in first round but lost to Robert Kendrick in straight sets in second round. He partnered Johan Landsberg in men's doubles qualifying round but they lost in first round to Irakli Labadze and Dušan Vemić. He lost to Rajeev Ram in first round of Aptos Challenger but he took his revenge by defeating Ram and Todd Widom in doubles final with Prakash Amritraj in a hard-fought match. He had quarterfinals exits in both singles and doubles with Prakash at Challenger de Granby. He qualified for main draw of Bukhara Challenger and went on to reach the final where he lost to Janko Tipsarević in straight sets, he also reached the finals of doubles with Aisam-ul-Haq Qureshi where they lost in tie-breaker. He entered main draw of Mumbai Open as a wildcard and lost to 8th seeded Wesley Moodie. But he reached doubles event final with Mustafa Ghouse. They upset top seeds and 4th seeds in the first round and in the semi-finals respectively to reach the finals, they were defeated by Mahesh Bhupathi and Mario Ančić.

Bopanna won the Asian Hopman Cup with Sania Mirza which was the qualifying event for 2007 Hopman Cup. He was selected after Leander Paes withdrew due to an injury. They defeated Chinese Taipei pair. Sania defeated Hwang I-hsuan. Bopanna defeated Chen Ti. In mixed doubles they defeated Hwang/Chan. He was selected for 2006 Asian Games. In Singles event he was seeded 8th which gave him a bye to round of 32. But he lost to Sun Peng in straight sets. In Doubles event he was seeded 4th with Mustafa Ghouse and they reached quarterfinals before bowing out to Koreans Jun Woong-sun and Kim Sun-yong in straight sets. In team event India faced 2nd seeded Chinese Taipei in round of 16. Bopanna won his singles match against Lu Yen-hsun but Karan Rastogi and pair of Mahesh Bhupathi and Leander Paes lost their matches. India lost to Chinese Taipei 2–1. He ended the season at India F3 Futures Tournament. He was top seed in both singles and doubles and managed to reach finals of both events. In singles final he lost to his occasional partner and 4th seeded Aisam-ul-Haq Qureshi, in doubles final he and Mustafa Ghouse lost to 2nd seeds Sunil-Kumar Sipaeya and Alexey Kedryuk in straight sets. He ended the season with 259 rank in singles which still remains with best year end singles rank.

=== 2007: Breakthrough at Challenger Level, Early Success with Qureshi ===
2007 was another breakthrough year for Bopanna. He won 5 challenger titles(4 Doubles, 1 Singles) and reached 11 finals(10 Challengers and 1 ATP). During the season he won 4 consecutive Challenger titles with Aisam-ul-Haq Qureshi. Bopanna distinguished himself as one of India's finest doubles players at the 2007 Hopman Cup. He lost his first singles match, but helped clinch a 2–1 victory with Sania Mirza over the Czech Republic in the final and decisive mixed doubles match. In their second confrontation against Croatia, the scenario was repeated, with Mirza winning her singles match while Bopanna lost. Together they defeated the Croats in mixed doubles to end up with four points out of three matches. India lost to Spain to finish runners-up in Group B, with Mirza and Bopanna losing both their singles matches, but winning in mixed doubles. At Australian Open men's singles qualifiers he defeated Tobias Clemens but lost to Michael Berrer in second round in straight sets. He reached quarterfinals of Dallas Challenger both in singles and doubles. He reached the quarterfinals of Kyoto Challenger with Mustafa Ghouse. He lost to Bastian Knittel in the quarterfinals at the Samsung Challenger in Ho Chi Minh City in a close and hard-fought match.

In Davis Cup tie against Kazakhstan, he win his singles match in straight sets against Dmitriy Makeyev. In doubles match with Leander Paes he again defeated Makeyev and Alexey Kedryuk in straight sets. But he lost rubber singles match against Kedryuk in a five-setter match. India won the tie 3–2 to stay in Group 1. He had first round exit at Karlsruhe Challenger in both singles and doubles. He reached the semi-finals of Surbiton Trophy with Chris Haggard as four seeds losing to eventual champions Mischa Zverev and Alex Kuznetsov in a tie breaker. In singles he was top seed in qualifiers but lost to Gilles Elseneer in last qualifying round.

=== 2008: First ATP title ===
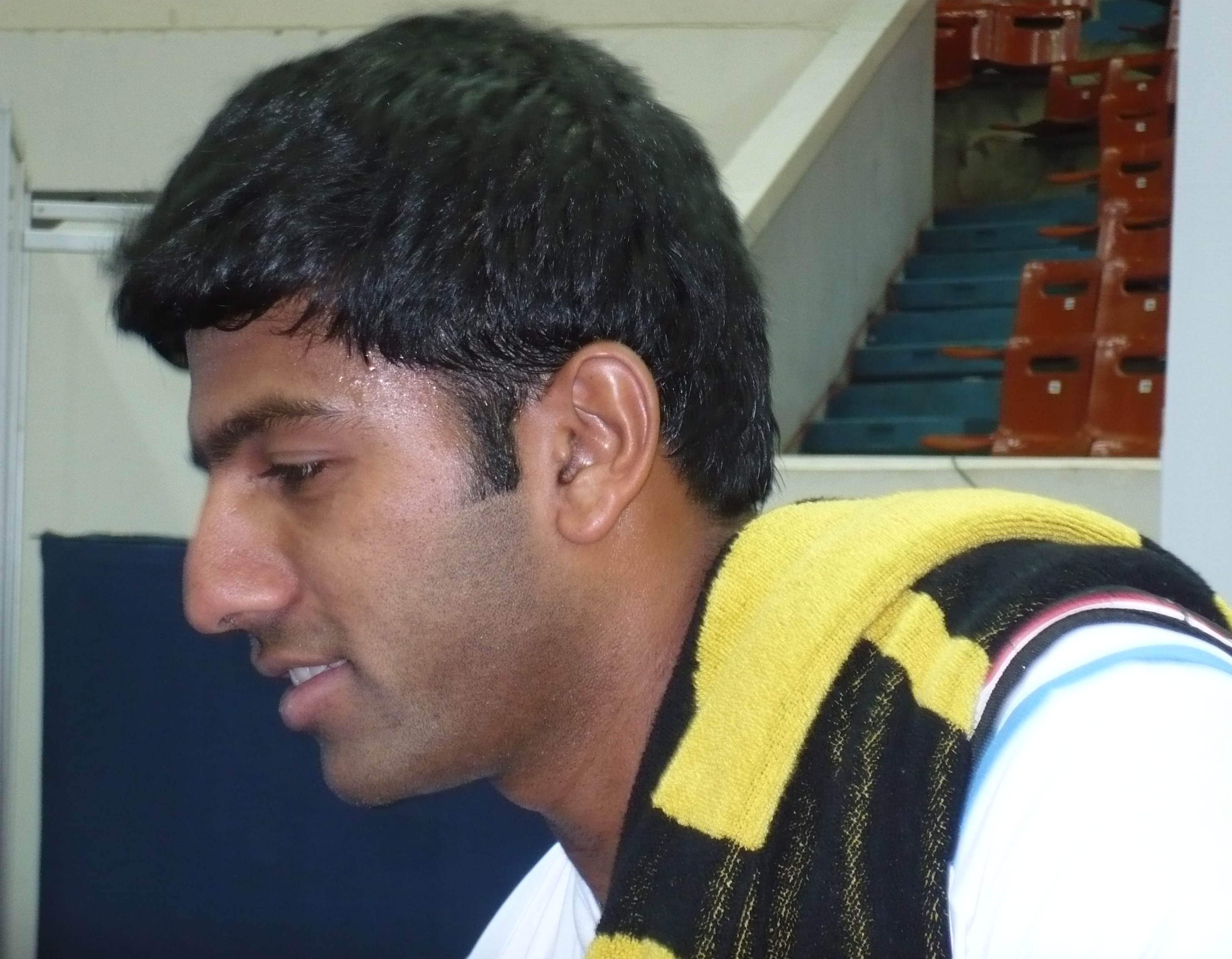
Bopanna at the St. Petersburg Open 2008, doubles quarterfinals

Bopanna won the men's doubles title at the Countrywide Classic in Los Angeles with partner Eric Butorac. This was his first ATP title.

=== 2009: Struggle in Doubles ===
Rohan started the season fairly well by qualifying for the Chennai Open, but lost in the first round of the main draw. In February, he made it to the final of the SAP Open in San Jose, California, partnering with Jarkko Nieminen.

=== 2010s ===
==== 2010: First Grand Slam doubles final ====
Rohan Bopanna started the year on a high, reaching the quarterfinals of the Chennai Open, partnering with Mahesh Bhupathi.

In February, with Aisam-ul-Haq Qureshi, Bopanna won his second, and the duo's first, ATP doubles title, beating Karol Beck and Harel Levy in the final of the SA Tennis Open in a super-tiebreak. The duo reached the final of the Grand Prix Hassan II in Casablanca, Morocco. They reached the final of the Nice Open, before losing to the Brazilian pair of Marcelo Melo and Bruno Soares.

In June, Bopanna and Qureshi made it to the quarterfinals of a Grand Slam event for the first time in their careers at the Wimbledon Championships.

After a successful Wimbledon, Bopanna and Qureshi achieved another finals finish at the Atlanta Open. They beat the world No. 1 pair of the Bryan brothers in straight sets in the quarterfinals of the Legg Mason Tennis Classic in Washington, D.C. They lost their semi-final match to Mardy Fish and Mark Knowles. They then reached the final of the New Haven Open at Yale and the St. Petersburg Open.

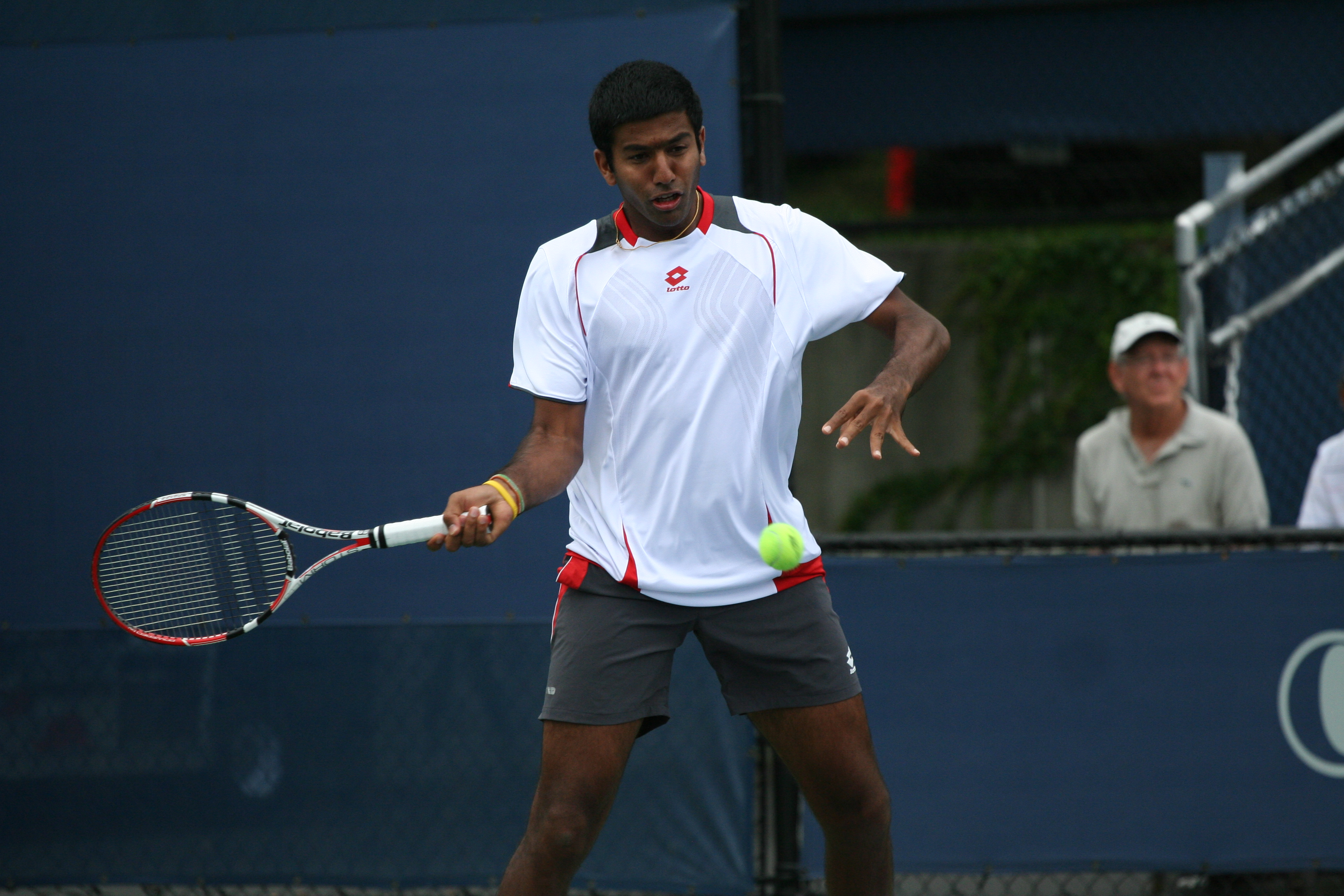
Bopanna at the 2010 US Open

At the US Open, Bopanna reached the final of a Grand Slam tournament for the first time. Bopanna and Qureshi were seeded 16th and beat the American team of Brian Battistone and Ryler DeHeart in the first round. In the second round, they eliminated Kohlmann and Jarkko Nieminen in straight sets. In the third round, the pair upset the second seeds Daniel Nestor and Zimonjic, again in straight sets. In a highly entertaining quarterfinal, Bopanna's big serves made a difference as they knocked out Wesley Moodie and Dick Norman. In their first semi-final appearance, the duo defeated the Argentine pair of Schwank and Zeballos, still in straight sets. The big-serving Bopanna was spot-on again, as he accumulated one ace after another. Bopanna even pounded an overhead over his shoulder, while retrieved a lob to force an error, causing a commentator to compare it to Roger Federer's between-the-legs winners against Novak Djokovic and Brian Dabul. The ambassadors of India and Pakistan to the US supported the duo at the final. The pair took on the world No. 1 and top-seeded Bryan brothers. The pair lost the final in two closely fought set. Bopanna was exceptional on serve and conjured some high-intensity aces.

Bopanna played a decisive role in India's 2010 Davis Cup triumph over Brazil, taking India back to the World Group for the first time since 1998. He won the decider against Ricardo Mello to clinch the tie 3–2 and take India into the World Group for the first time in 19 years.

==== 2011: Top 10 debut in doubles ====
Bopanna began the 2011 season with Qureshi at the Chennai Open in early January. With the IndoPak Express and the re-united Indian pair of Mahesh Bhupathi and Leander Paes on opposite sides of the draw, there were hopes for a dream final. However, Bopanna and Qureshi lost in the quarterfinal to eventual finalists Robin Haase and David Martin.

The duo finished in the semi-finals at the Medibank International in Sydney. They exited the Australian Open in the third round.

At the 2011 Davis Cup in Serbia, Bopanna played in singles and doubles with Somdev Devvarman after Paes and Bhupathi pulled out of the tournament due to injuries. Bopanna had many Serbian fans applauding his impressive winners, but having clawed his way back into the match after falling two sets behind, he lost the match in the fifth set. This match enabled Bopanna to qualify for the singles ties to make it to the main draw of the 2011 BNP Paribas Open in Indian Wells. Bopanna defeated Canada's Peter Polansky in a close encounter before outplaying Germany's Daniel Brands in straight sets to secure his spot in the top draw. Bopanna lost his opening round match against Australian player Bernard Tomic.

With Qureshi, he reached the quarterfinals of French Open. The duo won the Gerry Weber Open and exited in the semi-finals of the US Open. They won the Stockholm Open against Marcelo Melo and Bruno Soares. They reached the quarterfinals in Vienna and Valencia and won in Bercy against Julien Benneteau and Nicolas Mahut.

They participated in the 2011 ATP World Tour Finals in London, losing their first round-robin match to Max Mirnyi and Daniel Nestor.

==== 2012: Olympics, ATP Tour finals runner-up, Paris Masters title ====
In 2012, Bopanna played with compatriot Mahesh Bhupathi. They were seeded fourth at the Australian Open, but only made it to the third round. He and Bhupathi won their first title together at Dubai.

Bopanna has been selected to participate in the 2012 Summer Olympics in London in the Men's Doubles category partnering Bhupathi. Bopanna refused to partner Leander Paes for the doubles event at the Olympics triggering a row which finally led to two participating teams, as Paes partnered with Vishnu Vardhan.

On 20 August 2012 at the Masters 1000 in Cincinnati, Bopanna partnering Mahesh Bhupathi lost to Robert Lindstedt and Horia Tecău in the final.

On 4 November 2012, Bopanna and Bhupathi won the Paris Masters title.

On 6 November 2012, Boppana and Bhupathi lost the opening match of 2012 ATP World Tour Finals against Jonathan Marray and Frederik Nielsen but made it to semi-finals by defeating Max Mirnyi and Daniel Nestor. They defeated fellow Indian Leander Paes and Czech Radek Štěpánek to make the final.

==== 2013: World No. 3 in doubles ====
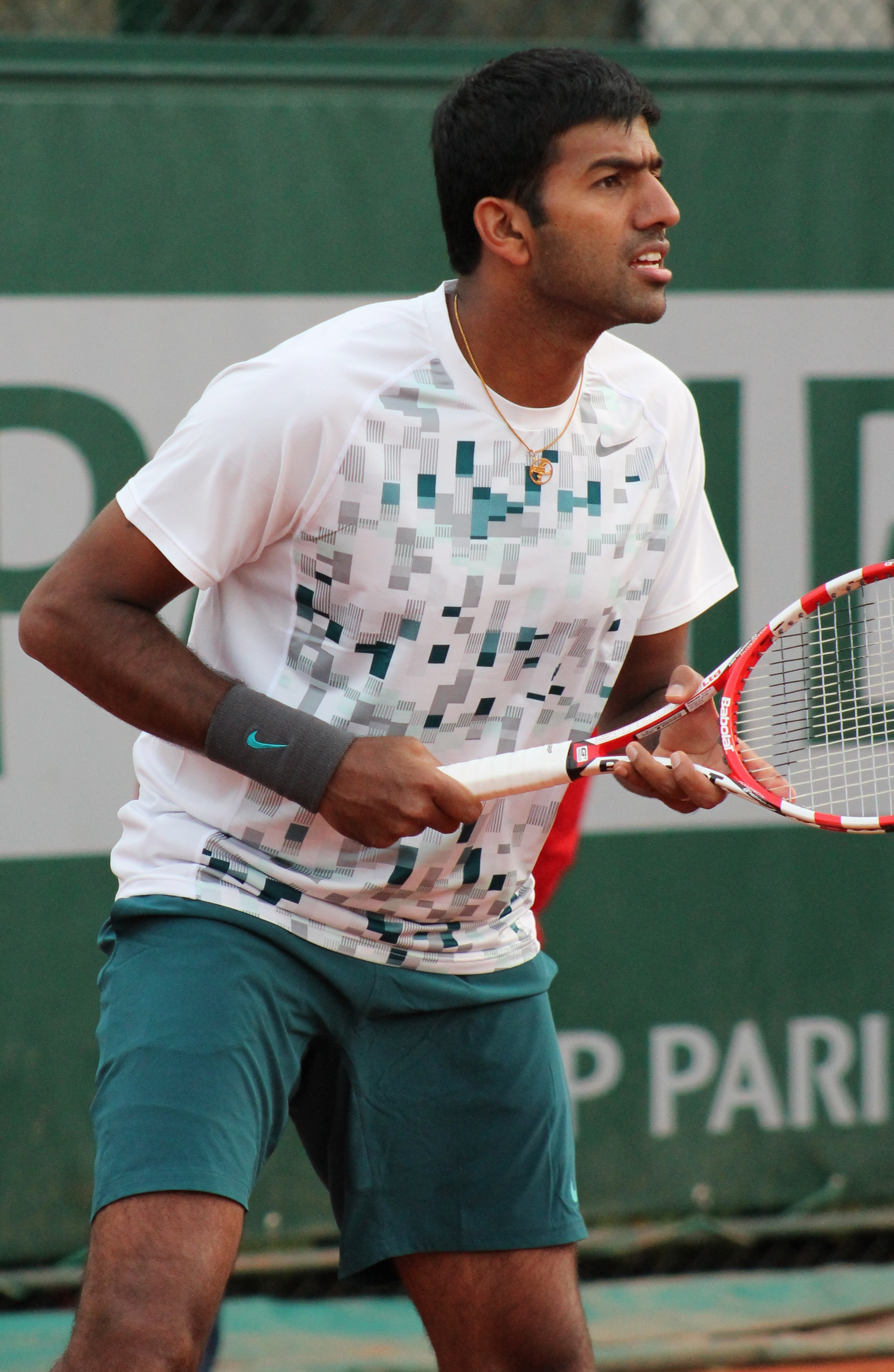
Bopanna at the 2013 French Open

Bopanna and Bhupathi played with different partners for the first three months of 2013, but rejoined forces starting with the Monte-Carlo Masters.

Rohan partnered Édouard Roger-Vasselin in Wimbledon in 2013 and reached the semi-finals before bowing out of the competition in a hard-fought match that ended in five sets against the Bryan brothers.

After the team's run at Wimbledon in 2013, Rohan reached his career best ranking of world No. 3 in doubles on 22 July 2013, and was also the first time he became the highest Indian in the ATP rankings.

==== 2015: ATP Tour finals runner-up, Madrid Masters title ====
In November partnering Romanian Florin Mergea, the pair was the last to qualify for the 2015 ATP World Tour Finals. There, in spite of their seeding, they reached the final against the year-end No. 1 team of Mergea's Davis Cup and former juniors' partner, Romanian Horia Tecău, who played alongside Jean Julien Rojer.

==== 2017: First Grand Slam mixed-doubles title ====
Bopanna started the season with Chennai Open where he partnered with compatriot Jeevan Nedunchezhiyan. He lifted his first title at the tournament by defeating pair of Purav Raja and Divij Sharan in an all Indian final.

He entered the French Open with Canadian Gabriela Dabrowski. They won the title beating pair of Anna-Lena Grönefeld and Robert Farah in the final. This was Bopanna's maiden Grand Slam title making him the fourth Indian player to win a Grand Slam title.

In April, he won his fourth Masters title with Pablo Cuevas at Monte-Carlo Masters. They defeated Spanish pair of Feliciano López and Marc López in the final. In August, he paired with Ivan Dodig to reach second Masters final of the season at Rogers Cup. They lost the finals to French pair of Pierre-Hugues Herbert and Nicolas Mahut. He finished the year with doubles ranking of 18 winning three titles from six final appearances.

==== 2018: Second mixed-doubles final ====
Bopanna entered the Australian Open with Hungarian Tímea Babos. They reached the final but lost to Gabriela Dabrowski and Mate Pavić. This was Bopanna's second Grand Slam mixed-doubles final.

==== 2019: Doubles; ATP 250 title ====
In 2019 he won the Marahashtra Open with Divij Sharan.

==== 2020: Doubles; US Open quarterfinals ====
In 2020, he won the Qatar Open with Wesley Koolhof by beating Luke Bambridge and Santiago Gonzalez6 in the final. He also reached the quarterfinals at the US Open with Denis Shapovalov, where he suffered a defeat to Jean-Julien Rojer and Horia Tecau.

=== 2020s ===
==== 2021: Return to singles and doubles with Qureshi ====
In 2021 Bopanna participated in the Australian Open where he partnered with Ben McLachlan. They were defeated in the first round by Ji-sung Nam and Min-Kyu Song. He later entered as an alternate in the qualifying draw of the 2021 Singapore Tennis Open (hard indoor), a new 250 Series tournament, returning to play singles five years after the last time. He was defeated by Christopher Eubanks.

In March, he returned to play doubles with Qureshi seven years later since the last time he partnered with him at the Shenzhen where they lost in the quarterfinals. They lost in the first round against Jamie Murray and Bruno Soares at the Mexican Open. After five straight first round losses, Bopanna reached the quarterfinals of 2021 Madrid Open. He lastly played as a doubles pair with Qureshi at 2021 Kremlin Cup and reached the second round.

Rohan then paired up with Canadian Denis Shapovalov with whom he had recently reached the quarterfinals of Indian Wells Masters. Bopanna ended the year with a semi-final loss at St. Petersburg Open.

==== 2022: Doubles; three titles, major semi-final, top 20 ====
Rohan started the year with an ATP Tour 250 title at 2022 Adelaide International pairing with compatriot Ramkumar Ramanathan defeating top seeds Marcelo Melo and Ivan Dodig in straight sets in final. Rohan paired up with Édouard Roger-Vasselin for 2022 Adelaide International 2 and 2022 Australian Open but they had first round exits in both tournaments. He also lost in the first round in the Mixed doubles event with Darija Jurak Schreiber. Two weeks later, he won his second title of the year at the Maharastra Open with Ramkumar Ramanathan by defeating Australian pair of Luke Saville and John-Patrick Smith in final. He reached the quarterfinals of the Rotterdam Open and final of the Qatar Open with Denis Shapovalov losing to pair of Wesley Koolhof and Neal Skupski both times. Bopanna had a first round exit at Dubai tennis championships with Aslan Karatsev losing to top seeds and eventual finalists Mate Pavic and Nikola Mektic.

Bopanna began the clay court season with Jamie Murray at 2022 Monte-Carlo Masters en route to semi-finals defeating third and seventh seeded pairs on the way but losing to top seeds and eventual champions Rajeev Ram and Joe Salisbury in tie-breaker. At the 2022 French Open he reached the semi-finals for the first time at this Major, partnering Matwe Middelkoop defeating en route the second seeds, former World No. 1 pair and 2021 Wimbledon champions Nikola Mektic and Mate Pavic. This was Bopanna's first major semi-finals in men's doubles since 2015 Wimbledon. As a result, he returned to the top 25 in the doubles rankings.

Bopanna began the grass court season by reaching the semi-finals of Stuttgart Open with Denis Shapovalov. The pair followed this by also reaching the semi-finals of the 2022 Queen's Club Championships. However, Bopanna decided to skip the 2022 Wimbledon Championships as he decided that there was "no point" trying to compete in Wimbledon as there were going to be no points awarded at the tournament. This marked the first time since 2009 US Open that Bopanna had missed a Grand Slam doubles tournament.

In July, again partnering Middelkoop, Bopanna reached the final of the 2022 Hamburg Open, where they lost in the final to the pair of Lloyd Glasspool and Harri Heliövaara. In August, Bopanna and Middelkoop reached the semi-finals of the 2022 Washington Open. The pair lost in the first round of the 2022 US Open to the Italian duo of Lorenzo Sonego and Andrea Vavassori. Bopanna won his third title of the season when he alongside Middelkoop defeated Santiago González and Andrés Molteni in the final to win the doubles tennis title at the 2022 Tel Aviv Open. In October, the pair lost in the final of the 2022 European Open where they were defeated by the Dutch pair of Tallon Griekspoor and Botic van de Zandschulp.

==== 2023: Doubles; oldest Masters champion and major finalist ====
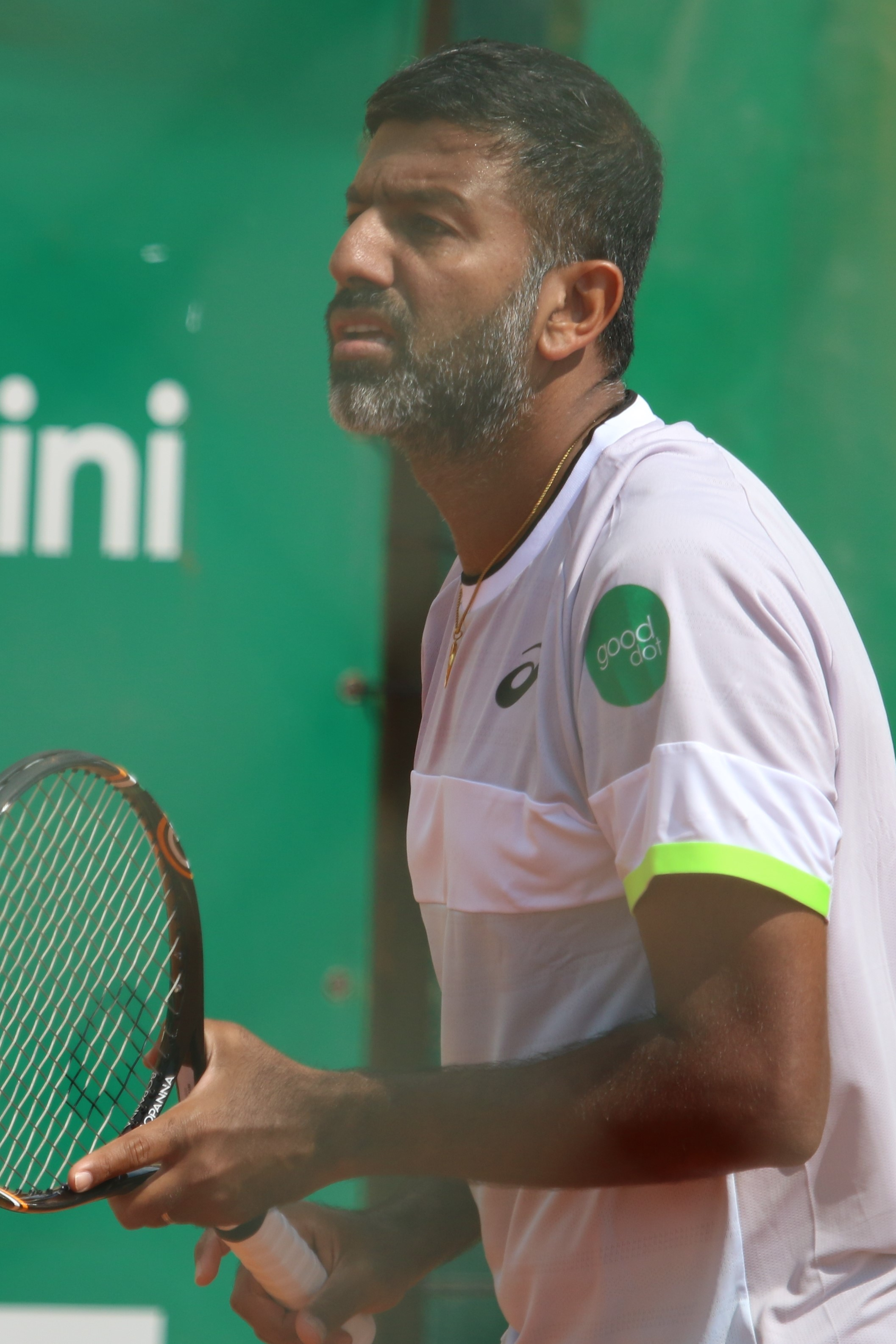
Bopanna at the 2023 Monte-Carlo Masters

In Rotterdam he reached the final with his new partner Matthew Ebden but lost after they held a championship point in the match tiebreak to Ivan Dodig and Austin Krajicek.

He won his first title with Matthew Ebden as a team at the 2023 Qatar ExxonMobil Open. Again partnering Ebden, he won his first title in Indian Wells, defeating defending champions Jack Sock and John Isner in the semi-finals and top seeds and world No. 1 pair Wesley Koolhof and Neal Skupski in the final in a third set super tiebreak becoming the oldest ATP Masters champion at 43 years-old.

He returned to the top 10 following the final in 2023 Mutua Madrid Open with Ebden, where they lost to Andrey Rublev and Karen Khachanov. He also reached the semi-finals at 2023 Wimbledon losing to the eventual champions Wesley Koolhof and Neal Skupski, returning to the top 10 on 17 July 2023. He also reached the finals at the 2023 US Open, thus becoming the oldest finalist at a Major. Continuing with his good form, he reached the finals of two other Masters 1000 events at the 2023 Rolex Shanghai Masters and at the 2023 Rolex Paris Masters. He became the oldest player to win a match at the 2023 ATP Finals with Ebden where the pair reached the semi-finals.

==== 2024–25: Doubles; oldest major champion and world No. 1, retirement ====
Bopanna alongside Ebden reached the Adelaide International final in their first outing of the 2024 season, where they lost to the pair of Rajeev Ram and Joe Salisbury in a tight match.

At the 2024 Australian Open, seeded second for the first time in Bopanna's career, the Indian/Australian duo reached the third round with a straight sets win over the 14th-seeded pair of Wesley Koolhof and Nikola Mektic, Bopanna's 500th doubles win, that assured him a career high ranking of world No. 2. Bopanna was in contention with Austin Krajicek for the ATP No. 1 doubles ranking and he achieved it with the quarterfinal win over the Argentinian pair of Máximo González and Andrés Molteni. He also became the oldest first-time world No. 1 at age 43, and became the highest ranked Indian doubles player since Leander Paes in 1999. Bopanna and Ebden reached their first Australian Open final with a tight win in three sets with a super tiebreaker over the unseeded pair of Tomáš Macháč and Zhizhen Zhang. In the final, they won in straight sets, defeating the Italian duo of Simone Bolelli and Andrea Vavassori. It was Bopanna's first doubles Major title. It took him 61 attempts and 19 partners to accomplish the feat.

The Indo-Aussie pair decided not to defend their points at the 2024 Rotterdam Open and the 2024 Qatar Open. Since Ebden's next-best results for ranking purposes were better than Bopanna's, Ebden attained the World No. 1 doubles ranking when their 2023 points were replaced on 26 February 2024. Bopanna reclaimed the top ranking once again on 4 March 2024 after winning his first round match at the Dubai Tennis Championships. However, he lost the top rank after failing to defend his Indian Wells title at the 2024 Indian Wells Open. He lost in the first round to the Belgian duo of Sander Gille and Joran Vliegen after a closely contested match.

The following week, Bopanna played at the 2024 Miami Open, where he became just the second Indian player to reach the final of all ATP Masters events. The pair went on to lift the trophy by defeating Ivan Dodig and Austin Krajicek in the final. At the age of 44, Bopanna overtook his own record to become the oldest ATP Masters 1000 finalist and champion. It was their second Masters 1000 as a pair, Bopanna's sixth and Ebden's second overall. His semi-final victory over the 4th seeded pair of Marcel Granollers and Horacio Zeballos also meant that he would once again regain the No.1 doubles ranking.

In April, at the 2024 Monte-Carlo Masters, Bopanna lost in the second round to Marcelo Arévalo and Mate Pavić after receiving a bye in the first round. As a result, he also lost his doubles top rank to his partner Ebden. At his next tournament, 2024 Madrid Open, Bopanna lost his opening round match against the eventual champions, Sebastian Korda and Jordan Thompson in the straight sets. The following week at the 2024 Italian Open, the Indo-Aussie pair won their first round match against the wildcard Italian pair of Matteo Arnaldi and Francesco Passaro. In the second round, they lost in the straight sets to the Italian pair of Simone Bolelli and Andrea Vavassori.

== Awards ==
For his efforts in bridging political barriers through sports, Rohan Bopanna was nominated in 2010 as a Champion for Peace by Monaco-based organization, Peace and Sport.

Recognized globally for their campaign "Stop War Start Tennis", Bopanna was awarded the renowned Arthur Ashe Humanitarian of the Year award in 2010, along with Qureshi. The duo were also voted winners of the Peace and Sport's Image of the Year award by their fans. He was also awarded the Ekalavya Award by the Government of Karnataka in 2005 for his achievements on court.

He was a recipient of the Arjuna Award, the second highest sporting honour of India in 2019. His name was announced among the awardees of the Padma Shri, the fourth highest civilian award of India, for the year 2024.

== Charity ==
Rohan Bopanna donates part of the profits generated by sales of 'Stop War Start Tennis' merchandise to the not-for-profit organisation 'GoSports Foundation'. In his hometown Coorg, he works towards generating funds for an Opportunity School that caters to the educational needs of physically handicapped children. Rohan also supports the Coorg Institute of Dental Sciences, which endeavours to provide low cost dental treatment and holds several free health and awareness camps.

He is now a member of the 'Champions for Peace' club, a Monaco-based international organization placed under the High Patronage of Prince Albert II.

== Personal life ==
Rohan, who is married to Supriya Annaiah, resides in Bangalore, where he is also the part owner of a restaurant. A grass-court enthusiast, his favourite tournament is Wimbledon, and his favourite player is Stefan Edberg.

== Career statistics ==
=== Performance timelines ===
Key
| W | F | SF | QF | #R | RR | Q# | DNQ | A | NH |

(W) winner; (F) finalist; (SF) semifinalist; (QF) quarterfinalist; (#R) rounds 4, 3, 2, 1; (RR) round-robin stage; (Q#) qualification round; (DNQ) did not qualify; (A) absent; (NH) not held; (SR) strike rate (events won / competed); (W–L) win–loss record.
To avoid confusion and double counting, these charts are updated at the conclusion of a tournament or when the player's participation has ended.

==== Men's doubles ====
| Tournament | 2006 | 2007 | 2008 | 2009 | 2010 | 2011 | 2012 | 2013 | 2014 | 2015 | 2016 | 2017 | 2018 | 2019 | 2020 | 2021 | 2022 | 2023 | 2024 | 2025 | SR | W–L | Win % |
|---|---|---|---|---|---|---|---|---|---|---|---|---|---|---|---|---|---|---|---|---|---|---|---|
| Australian Open | A | A | 3R | 2R | 1R | 3R | 3R | 2R | 3R | 2R | 3R | 2R | 3R | 1R | 1R | 1R | 1R | 1R | W | 1R | 1 / 18 | 22–17 | 56% |
| French Open | A | A | 1R | 1R | 2R | QF | 1R | 1R | 2R | 3R | QF | 3R | QF | 3R | 1R | QF | SF | 1R | SF | 3R | 0 / 18 | 28–18 | 61% |
| Wimbledon | Q1 | Q1 | 2R | A | QF | 1R | 2R | SF | 2R | SF | 3R | 2R | 2R | 1R | NH | 1R | A | SF | 2R | 1R | 0 / 15 | 23–15 | 61% |
| US Open | A | A | 1R | A | F | SF | 1R | 3R | 1R | QF | 2R | 2R | QF | 3R | QF | 3R | 1R | F | 3R | 1R | 0 / 17 | 31–17 | 65% |
| Win–loss | 0–0 | 0–0 | 3–4 | 1–2 | 9–4 | 9–4 | 3–4 | 7–4 | 4–4 | 10–4 | 8–4 | 5–4 | 9–4 | 3–4 | 2–3 | 4–4 | 4–3 | 9–4 | 12–3 | 2–4 | 1 / 68 | 104–67 | 61% |

==== Mixed doubles ====
| Tournament | 2008 | 2009 | 2010 | 2011 | 2012 | 2013 | 2014 | 2015 | 2016 | 2017 | 2018 | 2019 | 2020 | 2021 | 2022 | 2023 | 2024 | 2025 | SR | W–L | Win % |
|---|---|---|---|---|---|---|---|---|---|---|---|---|---|---|---|---|---|---|---|---|---|
| Australian Open | A | A | A | 1R | QF | QF | QF | 1R | QF | QF | F | 1R | QF | 1R | 1R | F | A | QF | 0 / 14 | 20–14 | 59% |
| French Open | A | A | A | 1R | 1R | 1R | QF | 1R | 2R | W | 1R | 1R | NH | A | 2R | A | 1R | A | 1 / 11 | 8–10 | 44% |
| Wimbledon | 2R | A | 1R | QF | QF | QF | 3R | 2R | 3R | QF | A | 2R | NH | 3R | A | 1R | A | A | 0 / 12 | 13–12 | 52% |
| US Open | A | A | 1R | 1R | 1R | 1R | QF | SF | QF | QF | 1R | 2R | NH | A | 1R | 2R | SF | A | 0 / 13 | 14–13 | 52% |
| Win–loss | 1–1 | 0–0 | 0–2 | 2–4 | 3–4 | 4–4 | 7–4 | 4–4 | 5–4 | 11–4 | 4–3 | 1–4 | 2–1 | 2–2 | 1–3 | 4–3 | 3–2 | 1–1 | 1 / 50 | 55–49 | 53% |

Note: Bopanna received walkovers in the 2nd round of 2012 Wimbledon, the 1st round of 2016 French Open and the quarterfinals of 2023 Australian Open, which do not officially count as a wins.

== Grand Slam tournament finals ==
=== Doubles: 3 (1 title, 2 runner-ups) ===
| Result | Year | Championship | Surface | Partner | Opponents | Score |
|---|---|---|---|---|---|---|
| Loss | 2010 | US Open | Hard | Aisam-ul-Haq Qureshi | Bob Bryan; Mike Bryan | 6–7^{(5–7)}, 6–7^{(4–7)} |
| Loss | 2023 | US Open | Hard | Matthew Ebden | Rajeev Ram; Joe Salisbury | 6–2, 3–6, 4–6 |
| Win | 2024 | Australian Open | Hard | Matthew Ebden | Simone Bolelli; Andrea Vavassori | 7–6^{(7–0)}, 7–5 |

=== Mixed: 3 (1 title, 2 runner-ups) ===
| Result | Year | Championship | Surface | Partner | Opponents | Score |
|---|---|---|---|---|---|---|
| Win | 2017 | French Open | Clay | Gabriela Dabrowski | Anna-Lena Grönefeld; Robert Farah | 2–6, 6–2, [12–10] |
| Loss | 2018 | Australian Open | Hard | Tímea Babos | Gabriela Dabrowski; Mate Pavić | 6–2, 4–6, [9–11] |
| Loss | 2023 | Australian Open | Hard | Sania Mirza | Luisa Stefani; Rafael Matos | 6–7^{(2–7)}, 2–6 |

== Other finals ==
=== Year-end championships finals ===
==== Doubles: 2 (2 runner-ups) ====
| Result | Year | Championship | Surface | Partner | Opponents | Score |
|---|---|---|---|---|---|---|
| Loss | 2012 | London | Hard (i) | Mahesh Bhupathi | Marcel Granollers; Marc López | 5–7, 6–3, [3–10] |
| Loss | 2015 | London | Hard (i) | Florin Mergea | Jean-Julien Rojer; Horia Tecău | 4–6, 3–6 |

=== Masters 1000 finals ===
==== Doubles: 14 (6 titles, 8 runner-ups) ====
| Result | Year | Tournament | Surface | Partner | Opponents | Score |
|---|---|---|---|---|---|---|
| Win | 2011 | Paris | Hard (i) | Aisam-ul-Haq Qureshi | Julien Benneteau; Nicolas Mahut | 6–2, 6–4 |
| Loss | 2012 | Cincinnati | Hard | Mahesh Bhupathi | Robert Lindstedt; Horia Tecău | 5–7, 3–6 |
| Loss | 2012 | Shanghai | Hard | Mahesh Bhupathi | Leander Paes; Radek Štěpánek | 7–6^{(9–7)}, 3–6, [5–10] |
| Win | 2012 | Paris | Hard (i) | Mahesh Bhupathi | Aisam-ul-Haq Qureshi; Jean-Julien Rojer | 7–6^{(8–6)}, 6–3 |
| Loss | 2013 | Rome | Clay | Mahesh Bhupathi | Bob Bryan; Mike Bryan | 2–6, 3–6 |
| Win | 2015 | Madrid | Clay | Florin Mergea | Marcin Matkowski; Nenad Zimonjić | 6–2, 6–7^{(5–7)}, [11–9] |
| Loss | 2016 | Madrid | Clay | Florin Mergea | Jean-Julien Rojer; Horia Tecău | 4–6, 6–7^{(5–7)} |
| Win | 2017 | Monte Carlo | Clay | Pablo Cuevas | Feliciano López; Marc López | 6–3, 3–6, [10–4] |
| Loss | 2017 | Montreal | Hard | Ivan Dodig | Pierre-Hugues Herbert; Nicolas Mahut | 4–6, 6–3, [6–10] |
| Win | 2023 | Indian Wells | Hard | Matthew Ebden | Wesley Koolhof; Neal Skupski | 6–3, 2–6, [10–8] |
| Loss | 2023 | Madrid | Clay | Matthew Ebden | Karen Khachanov; Andrey Rublev | 3–6, 6–3, [3–10] |
| Loss | 2023 | Shanghai | Hard | Matthew Ebden | Marcel Granollers; Horacio Zeballos | 7–5, 2–6, [7–10] |
| Loss | 2023 | Paris | Hard (i) | Matthew Ebden | Santiago González; Édouard Roger-Vasselin | 2–6, 7–5, [7–10] |
| Win | 2024 | Miami | Hard | Matthew Ebden | Ivan Dodig; Austin Krajicek | 6–7^{(3–7)}, 6–3, [10–6] |

=== Olympic finals ===
==== Mixed doubles: 1 runner-up ====
| Result | Year | Championship | Surface | Partner | Opponents | Score |
|---|---|---|---|---|---|---|
| 4th place | 2016 | Rio de Janeiro | Hard | Sania Mirza | Lucie Hradecká; Radek Štěpánek | 1–6, 5–7 |
