= 1999 Gold Flake Open – Doubles =

Doubles
- 1999 Gold Flake Open

Final
- Champions: (India) Mahesh Bhupathi (India) Leander Paes
- Runners-up: (Zimbabwe) Wayne Black (South Africa) Neville Godwin
- Score: 4–6, 7–5, 6–4

Events
Singles	Doubles
← 1998 ·	Gold Flake Open	· 2000 →

Mahesh Bhupathi and Leander Paes were the defending champions. They successfully defended their title, defeating Wayne Black and Neville Godwin in the final 4–6, 7–5, 6–4.

== Seeds ==
1. (India) Mahesh Bhupathi / (India) Leander Paes (champions)
2. (Zimbabwe) Wayne Black / (South Africa) Neville Godwin (final)
3. (Germany) Jens Knippschild / (Sweden) Mikael Tillström (semifinals)
4. (Germany) Michael Kohlmann / (Switzerland) Filippo Veglio (first round)

== Draw ==
=== Key ===
- Q = Qualifier
- WC = Wild card
- LL = Lucky loser
- Alt = Alternate
- ITF = ITF entry
- PR = Protected ranking
- SR = Special ranking
- SE = Special exempt
- JE = Junior exempt
- JR = Junior Accelerator Programme entrant
- CO = College Accelerator Programme entrant
- NG = Next Gen Accelerator Program entrant
- w/o = Walkover
- r = Retired
- d = Defaulted

=== Draw ===
First round
1	(India) M Bhupathi (India) L Paes	6	6
(Italy) M Ardinghi (Italy) V Santopadre	4	3
(United States) M Keil (Brazil) A Sá	6	7
(Netherlands) S Groen (Netherlands) P Wessels	4	5
3	(Germany) J Knippschild (Sweden) M Tillström	6	7
(South Africa) J Coetzee (South Africa) M Wakefield	4	5
(United States) G Grant (United States) T.J. Middleton	6	6
WC	(Armenia) S Sargsian (India) F Syed	3	3
(Czech Republic) O Fukárek (Finland) T Ketola	3	6	6
Q	(United Kingdom) B Cowan (South Africa) W Whitehouse	6	4	2
(United States) P Goldstein (United States) J Stark	4	6	7
4	(Germany) M Kohlmann (Switzerland) F Veglio	6	4	5
(Spain) JI Carrasco (Spain) J Velasco Jr.	3	2
WC	(India) N Kirtane (India) S Kirtane	6	6
WC	(India) M Ghouse (India) S Prahlad	2	1
2	(Zimbabwe) W Black (South Africa) N Godwin	6	6

Quarterfinals
1	(India) M Bhupathi (India) L Paes	6	2	7
(United States) M Keil (Brazil) A Sá	1	6	6
3	(Germany) J Knippschild (Sweden) M Tillström	6	6
(United States) G Grant (United States) T.J. Middleton	4	0
(Czech Republic) O Fukárek (Finland) T Ketola	1	4
(United States) P Goldstein (United States) J Stark	6	6
WC	(India) N Kirtane (India) S Kirtane	4	2
2	(Zimbabwe) W Black (South Africa) N Godwin	6	6

Semifinals
1	(India) M Bhupathi (India) L Paes	4	7	6
3	(Germany) J Knippschild (Sweden) M Tillström	6	5	3
(United States) P Goldstein (United States) J Stark	2	1
2	(Zimbabwe) W Black (South Africa) N Godwin	6	6

Final
1	(India) M Bhupathi (India) L Paes	4	7	6
2	(Zimbabwe) W Black (South Africa) N Godwin	6	5	4
