= 2000 Gold Flake Open =

- Date: 3–10 January
- Edition: 5th
- Category: International Series
- Draw: 32S / 16D
- Prize money: $405,000
- Surface: Hard / outdoor
- Location: Chennai, India

Champions

Singles
- (France) Jérôme Golmard

Doubles
- (France) Julien Boutter / (Belgium) Christophe Rochus
| ← 1999 · | Maharashtra Open | · 2001 → |

The 2000 Gold Flake Open was a men's tennis tournament played on |outdoor hard courts in Chennai, India, that was part of the World Series of the 1999 ATP Tour. It was the fifth edition of the tournament and was held from 3 January until 10 January 2000. Fourth-seeded Jérôme Golmard won the singles title.

== Finals ==
=== Singles ===
(France) Jérôme Golmard defeated (Germany) Markus Hantschk 6–3, 6–7^{(6–8)}, 6–3

- It was Golmard's only title of the year and the 2nd of his career.

=== Doubles ===
(France) Julien Boutter / (Belgium) Christophe Rochus defeated (India) Prahlad Srinath / (India) Saurav Panja 7–5, 6–1

- It was Boutter's 1st title of the year and the 1st of his career. It was Rochus's only title of the year and the 1st of his career.
