= 2022 Hamburg European Open =

- Date: 17–24 July
- Edition: 116th (men); 20th (women)
- Category: ATP 500 (men); WTA 250 (women)
- Draw: 32S / 16D (men); 32S / 16D (women)
- Prize money: €1,030,900 (men) $251,750 (women)
- Surface: Clay
- Location: Hamburg, Germany
- Venue: Am Rothenbaum

Champions

Men's singles
- (Italy) Lorenzo Musetti

Women's singles
- (United States) Bernarda Pera

Men's doubles
- (United Kingdom) Lloyd Glasspool / (Finland) Harri Heliövaara

Women's doubles
- (United States) Sophie Chang / (United States) Angela Kulikov
- Hamburg European Open

The 2022 Hamburg European Open was a combined men's and women's tennis tournament played on outdoor clay courts. It was the 116th edition of the event for the men and the 20th edition for the women. The tournament was classified as a WTA 250 tournament on the 2022 WTA Tour and as an ATP Tour 500 series on the 2022 ATP Tour (called the Hamburg Open). The tournament took place at Am Rothenbaum in Hamburg, Germany between 17 and 24 July 2022.

== Finals ==
=== Men's singles ===
- (Italy) Lorenzo Musetti defeated (Spain) Carlos Alcaraz, 6–4, 6–7^{(6–8)}, 6–4

=== Women's singles ===
- (United States) Bernarda Pera defeated (Estonia) Anett Kontaveit, 6–2, 6–4

This was Pera's second WTA title of the year and her career.

=== Men's doubles ===
- (United Kingdom) Lloyd Glasspool / (Finland) Harri Heliövaara defeated (India) Rohan Bopanna / (Netherlands) Matwé Middelkoop, 6–2, 6–4

=== Women's doubles ===
- (United States) Sophie Chang / (United States) Angela Kulikov defeated (Japan) Miyu Kato / (Indonesia) Aldila Sutjiadi, 6–3, 4–6, [10–6]

== Points and prize money ==
=== Points distribution ===
Event	W	F	SF	QF	Round of 16	Round of 32	Q	Q2	Q1
Men's Singles	500	300	180	90	45	0	10	4	0
Men's Doubles	500	300	180	90	0	—N/a	45	25	—N/a
Women's Singles	280	180	110	60	30	1	18	12	1
Women's Doubles	280	180	110	60	1	—N/a	—N/a	—N/a	—N/a

=== Prize money ===
Event	W	F	SF	QF	Round of 16	Round of 32	Q2	Q1
Men's Singles	€331,125	€178,170	€94,925	€48,550	€25,900	€13,800	€7,080	€4,000
Men's Doubles*	€108,770	€58,000	€29,340	€14,670	€7,600	—N/a	—N/a	—N/a
Women's Singles	€26,770	€15,922	€8,870	€5,000	€3,065	€2,200	€1,613	€1,047
Women's Doubles*	€9,680	€5,400	€3,185	€1,895	€1,450	—N/a	—N/a	—N/a

_{*per team}

== ATP singles main draw entrants ==
=== Seeds ===
Country	Player	Rank^{1}	Seed
ESP	Carlos Alcaraz	6	1
	Andrey Rublev	8	2
ARG	Diego Schwartzman	14	3
ESP	Pablo Carreño Busta	18	4
NED	Botic van de Zandschulp	24	5
GEO	Nikoloz Basilashvili	25	6
	Karen Khachanov	27	7
DEN	Holger Rune	28	8

- ^{1} Rankings are as of 11 July 2022.

=== Other entrants ===
The following players received wildcards into the main draw:

- (Germany) Nicola Kuhn
- (Germany) Max Hans Rehberg
- (Germany) Jan-Lennard Struff

The following players received entry from with a protected ranking:

- (Slovenia) Aljaž Bedene
- (Croatia) Borna Ćorić

The following players received entry from the qualifying draw:

- (Colombia) Daniel Elahi Galán
- (Slovakia) Jozef Kovalík
- (Italy) Luca Nardi
- (Germany) Marko Topo

The following player received entry as a lucky loser:

- (Lithuania) Ričardas Berankis

=== Withdrawals ===
- (Kazakhstan) Alexander Bublik → replaced by (Lithuania) Ričardas Berankis
- (Hungary) Márton Fucsovics → replaced by (Italy) Lorenzo Musetti
- (France) Gaël Monfils → replaced by (Italy) Fabio Fognini
- (Germany) Oscar Otte → replaced by (Argentina) Federico Coria
- (Italy) Jannik Sinner → replaced by (Germany) Daniel Altmaier

== ATP doubles main draw entrants ==
=== Seeds ===
Country	Player	Country	Player	Rank^{1}	Seed
ESP	Marcel Granollers	ARG	Horacio Zeballos	7	1
NED	Wesley Koolhof	GBR	Neal Skupski	11	2
GER	Tim Pütz	NZL	Michael Venus	21	3
IND	Rohan Bopanna	NED	Matwé Middelkoop	45	4

- ^{1} Rankings are as of 11 July 2022.

=== Other entrants ===
The following pairs received wildcards into the doubles main draw:

- (Germany) Daniel Altmaier / (Germany) Jan-Lennard Struff
- (Jamaica) Dustin Brown / (Germany) Tobias Kamke

The following pair received entry from the qualifying draw:

- (Serbia) Ivan Sabanov / (Serbia) Matej Sabanov

The following pair received entry as lucky losers:

- (Netherlands) Sander Arends / (Netherlands) David Pel

=== Withdrawals ===
- (Croatia) Ivan Dodig / (United States) Austin Krajicek → replaced by (Colombia) Nicolás Barrientos / (Mexico) Miguel Ángel Reyes Varela
- (Netherlands) Tallon Griekspoor / (Netherlands) Botic van de Zandschulp → replaced by (Netherlands) Sander Arends / (Netherlands) David Pel
- (Croatia) Nikola Mektić / (Croatia) Mate Pavić → replaced by (Serbia) Nikola Ćaćić / (Serbia) Dušan Lajović

== WTA singles main draw entrants ==
=== Seeds ===
Country	Player	Rank^{1}	Seed
EST	Anett Kontaveit	2	1
	Daria Kasatkina	12	2
CZE	Barbora Krejčíková	17	3
	Aliaksandra Sasnovich	36	4
~~SLO~~	~~Tamara Zidanšek~~	~~55~~	~~5~~
	Varvara Gracheva	60	6
BEL	Maryna Zanevska	62	7
GER	Andrea Petkovic	70	8
ROU	Elena-Gabriela Ruse	72	9

- ^{1} Rankings are as of 11 July 2022.

=== Other entrants ===
The following players received wildcards into the main draw:

- (Estonia) Anett Kontaveit
- (Germany) Eva Lys
- (Germany) Nastasja Schunk

The following players received entry from the qualifying draw:

- (Romania) Alexandra Cadanțu-Ignatik
- (Argentina) María Lourdes Carlé
- (Japan) Nao Hibino
- (Germany) Sabine Lisicki
- Oksana Selekhmeteva
- (Switzerland) Joanne Züger

The following players received entry as lucky losers:

- (Ukraine) Kateryna Baindl
- (Netherlands) Suzan Lamens

=== Withdrawals ===
Before the tournament

- (United States) Danielle Collins → replaced by (Romania) Irina Bara
- (Hungary) Dalma Gálfi → replaced by (Netherlands) Suzan Lamens
- (Ukraine) Anhelina Kalinina → replaced by (United States) Bernarda Pera
- (Ukraine) Marta Kostyuk → replaced by (Japan) Misaki Doi
- (Kazakhstan) Elena Rybakina → replaced by (Brazil) Laura Pigossi
- (Denmark) Clara Tauson → replaced by (Serbia) Aleksandra Krunić
- (Slovenia) Tamara Zidanšek → replaced by (Ukraine) Kateryna Baindl
- (China) Zheng Qinwen → replaced by (Germany) Tamara Korpatsch

== WTA doubles main draw entrants ==
=== Seeds ===
Country	Player	Country	Player	Rank^{1}	Seed
ROU	Irina Bara	ROU	Monica Niculescu	98	1
~~SRB~~	~~Aleksandra Krunić~~	~~POL~~	~~Katarzyna Piter~~	~~120~~	~~2~~
JPN	Miyu Kato	INA	Aldila Sutjiadi	150	3
CHN	Han Xinyun		Alexandra Panova	155	4

- ^{1} Rankings are as of 11 July 2022.

=== Other entrants ===
The following pairs received a wildcard into the doubles main draw:

- (Germany) Anna Klasen / (Germany) Tamara Korpatsch
- (Germany) Nastasja Schunk / (Germany) Ella Seidel

The following pair received entry as alternates:

- (Argentina) María Lourdes Carlé / (Brazil) Laura Pigossi

=== Withdrawals ===
- (Serbia) Aleksandra Krunić / (Poland) Katarzyna Piter → replaced by (Argentina) María Lourdes Carlé / (Brazil) Laura Pigossi
