= 2022 Hamburg European Open – Men's doubles =

Men's doubles
- 2022 Hamburg European Open

Final
- Champion: (United Kingdom) Lloyd Glasspool; (Finland) Harri Heliövaara
- Runner-up: (India) Rohan Bopanna; (Netherlands) Matwé Middelkoop
- Score: 6–2, 6–4

Details
- Draw: 16
- Seeds: 4

Events
Singles	men	women
Doubles	men	women
- Hamburg European Open

Lloyd Glasspool and Harri Heliövaara defeated Rohan Bopanna and Matwé Middelkoop in the final, 6–2, 6–4 to win the men's doubles tennis title at the 2022 Hamburg European Open.

Tim Pütz and Michael Venus were the defending champions, but lost in the semifinals to Glasspool and Heliövaara.

== Seeds ==
1. (Spain) Marcel Granollers / (Argentina) Horacio Zeballos (semifinals)
2. (Netherlands) Wesley Koolhof / (United Kingdom) Neal Skupski (first round)
3. (Germany) Tim Pütz / (New Zealand) Michael Venus (semifinals)
4. (India) Rohan Bopanna / (Netherlands) Matwé Middelkoop (final)

== Draw ==
Key

- Q = Qualifier
- WC = Wild card
- LL = Lucky loser
- Alt = Alternate
- ITF = ITF entry
- PR = Protected ranking
- SR = Special ranking
- SE = Special exempt
- JE = Junior exempt
- JR = Junior Accelerator Programme entrant
- CO = College Accelerator Programme entrant
- NG = Next Gen Accelerator Program entrant
- w/o = Walkover
- r = Retired
- d = Defaulted

=== Draw ===
First round

Quarterfinals

Semifinals

Final

1
- (Spain) M Granollers
- (Argentina) H Zeballos
5
6
[10]

- (Mexico) S González
- (Argentina) A Molteni
7
2
[4]

1
- (Spain) M Granollers
- (Argentina) H Zeballos
w/o

- (Italy) S Bolelli
- (Italy) F Fognini
6
1
[8]

- K Khachanov
- A Rublev

- K Khachanov
- A Rublev
4
6
[10]

1
- (Spain) M Granollers
- (Argentina) H Zeballos
6
3
[3]

4
- (India) R Bopanna
- (Netherlands) M Middelkoop
6
6

4
- (India) R Bopanna
- (Netherlands) M Middelkoop
3
6
[10]

WC
- (Jamaica) D Brown
- (Germany) T Kamke
3
2

4
- (India) R Bopanna
- (Netherlands) M Middelkoop
6
6

Q
- (Serbia) I Sabanov
- (Serbia) M Sabanov
6^{1}
6
[5]

- (Serbia) N Ćaćić
- (Serbia) D Lajović
4
2

- (Serbia) N Ćaćić
- (Serbia) D Lajović
7^{7}
0
[10]

4
- (India) R Bopanna
- (Netherlands) M Middelkoop
2
4

LL
- (Netherlands) S Arends
- (Netherlands) D Pel
4
6^{4}

- (United Kingdom) L Glasspool
- (Finland) H Heliövaara
6
6

WC
- (Germany) D Altmaier
- (Germany) J-L Struff
6
7^{7}

WC
- (Germany) D Altmaier
- (Germany) J-L Struff
3
3

- A Karatsev
- (France) É Roger-Vasselin
5
4

3
- (Germany) T Pütz
- (New Zealand) M Venus
6
6

3
- (Germany) T Pütz
- (New Zealand) M Venus
7
6

3
- (Germany) T Pütz
- (New Zealand) M Venus
4
4

- (Colombia) N Barrientos
- (Mexico) MÁ Reyes Varela
7^{7}
3
[8]

- (United Kingdom) L Glasspool
- (Finland) H Heliövaara
6
6

- (Germany) K Krawietz
- (Germany) A Mies
6^{5}
6
[10]

- (Germany) K Krawietz
- (Germany) A Mies
1
6^{0}

- (United Kingdom) L Glasspool
- (Finland) H Heliövaara
7
6

- (United Kingdom) L Glasspool
- (Finland) H Heliövaara
6
7^{7}

2
- (Netherlands) W Koolhof
- (United Kingdom) N Skupski
5
2

== Qualifying ==
=== Seeds ===
1. (Serbia) Ivan Sabanov / (Serbia) Matej Sabanov (qualified)
2. (France) Fabien Reboul / (New Zealand) Artem Sitak (first round)

=== Qualifiers ===
1. (Serbia) Ivan Sabanov / (Serbia) Matej Sabanov

=== Lucky losers ===
1. (Netherlands) Sander Arends / (Netherlands) David Pel

=== Qualifying draw ===
First round

Qualifying competition

1
- (Serbia) Ivan Sabanov
- (Serbia) Matej Sabanov
6
6

WC
- (Germany) Mats Rosenkranz
- (Germany) Marko Topo
3
2

1
- (Serbia) Ivan Sabanov
- (Serbia) Matej Sabanov
6
3
[10]

PR
- (Netherlands) Sander Arends
- (Netherlands) David Pel
3
6
[8]

PR
- (Netherlands) Sander Arends
- (Netherlands) David Pel
5
6
[11]

2/Alt
- (France) Fabien Reboul
- (New Zealand) Artem Sitak
7
4
[9]
