= 1998 Gold Flake Open – Doubles =

Doubles
- 1998 Gold Flake Open

Final
- Champions: (India) Mahesh Bhupathi (India) Leander Paes
- Runners-up: (France) Olivier Delaître (Belarus) Max Mirnyi
- Score: 6–7, 6–3, 6–2

Events
Singles	Doubles
← 1997 ·	Gold Flake Open	· 1999 →

Mahesh Bhupathi and Leander Paes were the defending champions. They successfully defended their title, defeating Olivier Delaître and Max Mirnyi in the final 6–7, 6–3, 6–2.

== Seeds ==
1. (Australia) Todd Woodbridge / (Australia) Mark Woodforde (quarterfinals)
2. (India) Mahesh Bhupathi / (India) Leander Paes (champions)
3. (United States) Jeff Salzenstein / (United States) Jonathan Stark (first round)
4. (France) Olivier Delaître / (Belarus) Max Mirnyi (final)

== Draw ==
=== Key ===
- Q = Qualifier
- WC = Wild card
- LL = Lucky loser
- Alt = Alternate
- SE = Special exempt
- PR = Protected ranking
- ITF = ITF entry
- JE = Junior exempt
- w/o = Walkover
- r = Retired
- d = Defaulted
- SR = Special ranking

=== Draw ===
First round
1	(Australia) T Woodbridge (Australia) M Woodforde	6	6
(United States) D DiLucia (Australia) P Tramacchi	2	2
WC	(Germany) L Burgsmüller (Germany) R Schüttler	6	1	1
(France) A Clément (France) J Golmard	4	6	6
4	(France) O Delaître (Belarus) M Mirnyi	6	6
WC	(India) H Mankad (India) G Natekar	1	2
(Italy) M Ardinghi (Italy) V Santopadre	6	6
(United Kingdom) A Richardson (South Africa) M Wakefield	2	1
WC	(India) S Kirtane (India) V Uppal	2	4
(United Kingdom) B Cowan (Switzerland) F Veglio	6	6
Q	(South Africa) D Nainkin (South Africa) W Whitehouse	7	6
3	(United States) J Salzenstein (United States) J Stark	6	4
(Czech Republic) P Luxa (Israel) E Ran	6	6
(Germany) M Hilpert (United States) J Thomas	0	2
(Netherlands) S Groen (Romania) A Pavel	3	6	5
2	(India) M Bhupathi (India) L Paes	6	3	7

Quarterfinals
1	(Australia) T Woodbridge (Australia) M Woodforde	6	1
(France) A Clément (France) J Golmard	7	6
4	(France) O Delaître (Belarus) M Mirnyi	6	3	6
(Italy) M Ardinghi (Italy) V Santopadre	3	6	2
(United Kingdom) B Cowan (Switzerland) F Veglio	2	6	7
Q	(South Africa) D Nainkin (South Africa) W Whitehouse	6	4	6
(Czech Republic) P Luxa (Israel) E Ran	6	2	3
2	(India) M Bhupathi (India) L Paes	3	6	6

Semifinals
(France) A Clément (France) J Golmard	3	2
4	(France) O Delaître (Belarus) M Mirnyi	6	6
(United Kingdom) B Cowan (Switzerland) F Veglio	6	1	6
2	(India) M Bhupathi (India) L Paes	2	6	7

Final
4	(France) O Delaître (Belarus) M Mirnyi	7	3	2
2	(India) M Bhupathi (India) L Paes	6	6	6
