= 2022 Hamburg European Open – Women's doubles =

Women's doubles
- 2022 Hamburg European Open

Final
- Champions: (United States) Sophie Chang (United States) Angela Kulikov
- Runners-up: (Japan) Miyu Kato (Indonesia) Aldila Sutjiadi
- Score: 6–3, 4–6, [10–6]

Details
- Draw: 16
- Seeds: 4

Events
Singles	men	women
Doubles	men	women
- Hamburg European Open

Sophie Chang and Angela Kulikov defeated Miyu Kato and Aldila Sutjiadi in the final, 6–3, 4–6, [10–6] to win the women's doubles tennis title at the 2022 Hamburg European Open.

Jasmine Paolini and Jil Teichmann were the reigning champions, but did not defend their title.

== Seeds ==
1. (Romania) Irina Bara / (Romania) Monica Niculescu (semifinals)
2. (Serbia) Aleksandra Krunić / (Poland) Katarzyna Piter (withdrew)
3. (Japan) Miyu Kato / (Indonesia) Aldila Sutjiadi (final)
4. (China) Han Xinyun / Alexandra Panova (quarterfinals)

== Draw ==
Key

- Q = Qualifier
- WC = Wild card
- LL = Lucky loser
- Alt = Alternate
- ITF = ITF entry
- PR = Protected ranking
- SR = Special ranking
- SE = Special exempt
- JE = Junior exempt
- JR = Junior Accelerator Programme entrant
- CO = College Accelerator Programme entrant
- NG = Next Gen Accelerator Program entrant
- w/o = Walkover
- r = Retired
- d = Defaulted

=== Draw ===
First round
1	(Romania) I Bara (Romania) M Niculescu	6	7
SR	(Germany) J Lohoff (Romania) LI Paar	2	5
(Japan) M Doi (Sweden) R Peterson	4	6	[10]
(Norway) U Eikeri (Germany) A-L Friedsam	6	2	[8]
3	(Japan) M Kato (Indonesia) A Sutjiadi	6	6
A Gasanova; V Gracheva	4	3
(France) E Lechemia (United States) S Santamaria	0	1
WC	(Germany) N Schunk (Germany) E Seidel	6	6
A Potapova; Y Sizikova	6	6
(Germany) V Heisen (United Kingdom) S Murray Sharan	1	3
(France) E Cascino (Netherlands) R van der Hoek	0	0^{r}
4	(China) X Han; A Panova	6	1
(United States) S Chang (United States) A Kulikov	6	0	[10]
(United Kingdom) A Barnett (United Kingdom) O Nicholls	3	6	[2]
WC	(Germany) A Klasen (Germany) T Korpatsch	3	3
Alt	(Argentina) ML Carlé (Brazil) L Pigossi	6	6

Quarterfinals
1	(Romania) I Bara (Romania) M Niculescu	6	3	[10]
(Japan) M Doi (Sweden) R Peterson	3	6	[4]
3	(Japan) M Kato (Indonesia) A Sutjiadi	6	6
WC	(Germany) N Schunk (Germany) E Seidel	4	2
A Potapova; Y Sizikova	6	3	[10]
4	(China) X Han; A Panova	1	6	[7]
(United States) S Chang (United States) A Kulikov	6	6
Alt	(Argentina) ML Carlé (Brazil) L Pigossi	4	1

Semifinals
1	(Romania) I Bara (Romania) M Niculescu	4	6	[4]
3	(Japan) M Kato (Indonesia) A Sutjiadi	6	1	[10]
A Potapova; Y Sizikova	6	4	[7]
(United States) S Chang (United States) A Kulikov	0	6	[10]

Final
3	(Japan) M Kato (Indonesia) A Sutjiadi	3	6	[6]
(United States) S Chang (United States) A Kulikov	6	4	[10]
