= 2022 Hamburg European Open – Women's singles =

Women's singles
- 2022 Hamburg European Open

Final
- Champion: (United States) Bernarda Pera
- Runner-up: (Estonia) Anett Kontaveit
- Score: 6–2, 6–4

Details
- Draw: 32
- Seeds: 8

Events
| Singles | men | women |
| Doubles | men | women |
- Hamburg European Open

Bernarda Pera defeated Anett Kontaveit in the final, 6–2, 6–4 to win the women's singles tennis title at the 2022 Hamburg European Open. It was her second WTA Tour title in as many weeks, and she neither dropped a set nor lost more than four games in any set en route to the title.

Elena-Gabriela Ruse was the defending champion, but lost in the first round to Pera.

== Seeds ==
1. (Estonia) Anett Kontaveit (final)
2. Daria Kasatkina (first round)
3. (Czech Republic) Barbora Krejčíková (quarterfinals)
4. Aliaksandra Sasnovich (quarterfinals)
5. (Slovenia) Tamara Zidanšek (withdrew)
6. Varvara Gracheva (first round)
7. (Belgium) Maryna Zanevska (semifinals)
8. (Germany) Andrea Petkovic (quarterfinals, retired)
9. (Romania) Elena-Gabriela Ruse (first round)

== Draw ==
Key

- Q = Qualifier
- WC = Wild card
- LL = Lucky loser
- Alt = Alternate
- ITF = ITF entry
- PR = Protected ranking
- SR = Special ranking
- SE = Special exempt
- JE = Junior exempt
- JR = Junior Accelerator Programme entrant
- CO = College Accelerator Programme entrant
- NG = Next Gen Accelerator Program entrant
- w/o = Walkover
- r = Retired
- d = Defaulted

=== Finals ===
Semifinals
1/WC | (Estonia) Anett Kontaveit | 6 | 7
Anastasia Potapova | 3 | 5
7 | (Belgium) Maryna Zanevska | 2 | 4
(United States) Bernarda Pera | 6 | 6

Final
1/WC | (Estonia) Anett Kontaveit | 2 | 4
(United States) Bernarda Pera | 6 | 6

=== Top half ===
First round
1/WC | (Estonia) A Kontaveit | 6 | 7^{7}
(Romania) I Bara | 3 | 6^{3}
LL | (Ukraine) K Baindl | 3 | 0
(Sweden) R Peterson | 6 | 6
(Japan) M Doi | 7^{12} | 6
Q | O Selekhmeteva | 6^{10} | 0
(Germany) T Korpatsch | 3 | 3
8 | (Germany) A Petkovic | 6 | 6
3 | (Czech Republic) B Krejčíková | 6 | 6
LL | (Netherlands) S Lamens | 2 | 4
A Kalinskaya | 1 | 0^{r}
(Poland) M Fręch | 6 | 0
Q | (Argentina) ML Carlé | 7 | 3 | 6
WC | (Germany) E Lys | 5 | 6 | 2
A Potapova | 7 | 6
6 | V Gracheva | 5 | 3

Second round
1/WC | (Estonia) A Kontaveit | 6 | 6
(Sweden) R Peterson | 3 | 2
(Japan) M Doi | 4 | 3
8 | (Germany) A Petkovic | 6 | 6
3 | (Czech Republic) B Krejčíková | 6 | 6
(Poland) M Fręch | 3 | 0
Q | (Argentina) ML Carlé | 1 | 4
A Potapova | 6 | 6

Quarterfinals
1/WC | (Estonia) A Kontaveit | 6 | 2
8 | (Germany) A Petkovic | 0 | 0^{r}
3 | (Czech Republic) B Krejčíková | 1 | 3
A Potapova | 6 | 6

Semifinals
1/WC | (Estonia) A Kontaveit | 6 | 7
A Potapova | 3 | 5

=== Bottom half ===
First round
7 | (Belgium) M Zanevska | 4 | 6 | 6
(Bulgaria) V Tomova | 6 | 4 | 3
Q | (Romania) A Cadanțu-Ignatik | 6 | 2 | 6
Q | (Japan) N Hibino | 3 | 6 | 2
(Serbia) A Krunić | 6 | 6
Q | (Germany) S Lisicki | 4 | 2
WC | (Germany) N Schunk | 1 | 4
4 | A Sasnovich | 6 | 6
9 | (Romania) E-G Ruse | 0 | 4
(United States) B Pera | 6 | 6
Q | (Switzerland) J Züger | 6 | 0 | 6
(Germany) J Niemeier | 4 | 6 | 4
(Hungary) RL Jani | 6 | 3 | 4
(Brazil) L Pigossi | 1 | 6 | 6
(Czech Republic) K Siniaková | 6 | 2 | 6
2 | D Kasatkina | 2 | 6 | 4

Second round
7 | (Belgium) M Zanevska | 6 | 6
Q | (Romania) A Cadanțu-Ignatik | 4 | 1
(Serbia) A Krunić | 3 | 2
4 | A Sasnovich | 6 | 6
(United States) B Pera | 6 | 6
Q | (Switzerland) J Züger | 1 | 1
(Brazil) L Pigossi | 1 | 1
(Czech Republic) K Siniaková | 6 | 6

Quarterfinals
7 | (Belgium) M Zanevska | 6 | 7
4 | A Sasnovich | 4 | 5
(United States) B Pera | 6 | 6
(Czech Republic) K Siniaková | 3 | 1

Semifinals
7 | (Belgium) M Zanevska | 2 | 4
(United States) B Pera | 6 | 6

== Qualifying ==
=== Seeds ===
1. (Ukraine) Kateryna Baindl (qualifying competition, lucky loser)
2. Anastasia Gasanova (qualifying competition)
3. (Belgium) Ysaline Bonaventure (first round)
4. Oksana Selekhmeteva (qualified)
5. (Argentina) Paula Ormaechea (first round)
6. (Netherlands) Suzan Lamens (qualifying competition, lucky loser)
7. (Netherlands) Arianne Hartono (qualifying competition)
8. (Switzerland) Joanne Züger (qualified)
9. (United States) Grace Min (first round)
10. (Romania) Alexandra Cadanțu-Ignatik (qualified)
11. (Argentina) María Lourdes Carlé (qualified)
12. (Switzerland) Stefanie Vögele (first round)

=== Qualifiers ===
1. (Germany) Sabine Lisicki
2. (Switzerland) Joanne Züger
3. (Japan) Nao Hibino
4. Oksana Selekhmeteva
5. (Romania) Alexandra Cadanțu-Ignatik
6. (Argentina) María Lourdes Carlé

=== Lucky losers ===
1. (Ukraine) Kateryna Baindl
2. (Netherlands) Suzan Lamens

=== Qualifying draw ===
==== First qualifier ====
First round
1 | (Ukraine) Kateryna Baindl | 6 | 6
(Bosnia and Herzegovina) Dea Herdželaš | 0 | 1
WC | (Germany) Sabine Lisicki | 7^{7} | 6
12 | (Switzerland) Stefanie Vögele | 6^{5} | 2

Qualifying competition
1 | (Ukraine) Kateryna Baindl | 6 | 4 | 6^{5}
WC | (Germany) Sabine Lisicki | 3 | 6 | 7^{7}

==== Second qualifier ====
First round
2 | Anastasia Gasanova | 6 | 6
(China) You Xiaodi | 4 | 2
(Czech Republic) Jesika Malečková | 2 | 6 | 3
8 | (Switzerland) Joanne Züger | 6 | 4 | 6

Qualifying competition
2 | Anastasia Gasanova | 6^{6} | 2
8 | (Switzerland) Joanne Züger | 7^{8} | 6

==== Third qualifier ====
First round
3 | (Belgium) Ysaline Bonaventure | 3 | 3
(Japan) Nao Hibino | 6 | 6
(Austria) Sinja Kraus | 2 | 1
7 | (Netherlands) Arianne Hartono | 6 | 6

Qualifying competition
(Japan) Nao Hibino | 3 | 6 | 7^{7}
7 | (Netherlands) Arianne Hartono | 6 | 4 | 6^{2}

==== Fourth qualifier ====
First round
4 | Oksana Selekhmeteva | 5 | 6 | 6
Yuliya Hatouka | 7 | 1 | 0
WC | (Germany) Noma Noha Akugue | 2 | 7 | 7^{7}
9 | (United States) Grace Min | 6 | 5 | 6^{1}

Qualifying competition
4 | Oksana Selekhmeteva | 6 | 6
WC | (Germany) Noma Noha Akugue | 2 | 2

==== Fifth qualifier ====
First round
5 | (Argentina) Paula Ormaechea | 1 | 3
(Germany) Anna-Lena Friedsam | 6 | 6
WC | (Germany) Ella Seidel | 2 | 1
10 | (Romania) Alexandra Cadanțu-Ignatik | 6 | 6

Qualifying competition
(Germany) Anna-Lena Friedsam | 7 | 5 | 6^{6}
10 | (Romania) Alexandra Cadanțu-Ignatik | 5 | 7 | 7^{8}

==== Sixth qualifier ====
First round
6 | (Netherlands) Suzan Lamens | 6 | 6
WC | (Austria) Barbara Haas | 3 | 4
(United States) Sophie Chang | 5 | 4
11 | (Argentina) María Lourdes Carlé | 7 | 6

Qualifying competition
6 | (Netherlands) Suzan Lamens | 0 | 6 | 4
11 | (Argentina) María Lourdes Carlé | 6 | 4 | 6
