= 1998 Gold Flake Open =

- Date: 6–13 April
- Edition: 3rd
- Category: World Series
- Draw: 32S / 16D
- Prize money: $405,000
- Surface: Hard / outdoor
- Location: Chennai, India

Champions

Singles
- (Australia) Patrick Rafter

Doubles
- (India) Leander Paes / (India) Mahesh Bhupathi
← 1997 ·	Maharashtra Open	· 1999 →

The 1998 Gold Flake Open was an ATP men's tennis tournament held in Chennai, India that was part of the World Series of the 1998 ATP Tour. It was the third edition of the tournament and was held on outdoor hard courts from 6 April to 13 April 1998. First-seeded Patrick Rafter won the singles title.

== Finals ==
=== Singles ===
(Australia) Patrick Rafter defeated (Sweden) Mikael Tillström 6–3, 6–4

- It was Rafter's 1st singles title of the year and the 3rd of his career.

=== Doubles ===
(India) Leander Paes / (India) Mahesh Bhupathi defeated (France) Olivier Delaître / (Belarus) Max Mirnyi 6–7, 6–3, 6–2

- It was Paes's 3rd title of the year and the 9th of his career. It was Bhupathi's 3rd title of the year and the 9th of his career.
