= 2022 Hamburg European Open – Men's singles =

Men's singles
- 2022 Hamburg European Open

Final
- Champion: (Italy) Lorenzo Musetti
- Runner-up: (Spain) Carlos Alcaraz
- Score: 6–4, 6–7^{(6–8)}, 6–4

Details
- Draw: 32 (4Q / 3WC)
- Seeds: 8

Events
Singles	men	women
Doubles	men	women
- Hamburg European Open

Lorenzo Musetti defeated Carlos Alcaraz in the final, 6–4, 6–7^{(6–8)}, 6–4 to win the men's singles tennis title at the 2022 Hamburg European Open. It was his first ATP Tour title, and he saved two match points en route, in his first round match against Dušan Lajović. For Alcaraz, it was his first loss in an ATP final.

Pablo Carreño Busta was the defending champion, but lost in the second round to Alex Molčan.

== Seeds ==
1. (Spain) Carlos Alcaraz (final)
2. Andrey Rublev (second round)
3. (Argentina) Diego Schwartzman (first round)
4. (Spain) Pablo Carreño Busta (second round)
5. (Netherlands) Botic van de Zandschulp (first round)
6. (Georgia (country)) Nikoloz Basilashvili (first round)
7. Karen Khachanov (quarterfinals)
8. (Denmark) Holger Rune (first round)

== Draw ==
Key

- Q = Qualifier
- WC = Wild card
- LL = Lucky loser
- Alt = Alternate
- ITF = ITF entry
- PR = Protected ranking
- SR = Special ranking
- SE = Special exempt
- JE = Junior exempt
- JR = Junior Accelerator Programme entrant
- CO = College Accelerator Programme entrant
- NG = Next Gen Accelerator Program entrant
- w/o = Walkover
- r = Retired
- d = Defaulted

=== Finals ===
Semifinals
1	(Spain) Carlos Alcaraz	7^{7}	6
(Slovakia) Alex Molčan	6^{2}	1
(Italy) Lorenzo Musetti	6	7^{7}
(Argentina) Francisco Cerúndolo	3	6^{3}

Final
1	(Spain) Carlos Alcaraz	4	7^{8}	4
(Italy) Lorenzo Musetti	6	6^{6}	6

=== Top half ===
First round
1	(Spain) C Alcaraz	3	6	7^{7}
WC	(Germany) N Kuhn	6	1	6^{3}
(Argentina) S Báez	1	6	6^{6}
(Serbia) F Krajinović	6	4	7^{8}
PR	(Slovenia) A Bedene	3	6	6^{5}
(Italy) F Fognini	6	3	7^{7}
WC	(Germany) J-L Struff	6	3	6^{2}
7	K Khachanov	3	6	7^{7}
4	(Spain) P Carreño Busta	6	6
Q	(Italy) L Nardi	2	1
Q	(Germany) M Topo	5	3
(Slovakia) A Molčan	7	6
(Serbia) L Đere	6	6^{4}	3
PR	(Croatia) B Ćorić	1	7^{7}	6
(Netherlands) T Griekspoor	7^{10}	7
8	(Denmark) H Rune	6^{8}	5

Second round
1	(Spain) C Alcaraz	7^{7}	6
(Serbia) F Krajinović	6^{4}	3
(Italy) F Fognini	3	5
7	K Khachanov	6	7
4	(Spain) P Carreño Busta	3	6	6^{5}
(Slovakia) A Molčan	6	1	7^{7}
PR	(Croatia) B Ćorić	6	6
(Netherlands) T Griekspoor	3	4

Quarterfinals
1	(Spain) C Alcaraz	6	6
7	K Khachanov	0	2
(Slovakia) A Molčan	7^{9}	2
PR	(Croatia) B Ćorić	6^{7}	0^{r}

Semifinals
1	(Spain) C Alcaraz	7^{7}	6
(Slovakia) A Molčan	6^{2}	1

=== Bottom half ===
First round
5	(Netherlands) B van de Zandschulp	4	4
(Spain) A Davidovich Fokina	6	6
Q	(Slovakia) J Kovalík	3	7	6
WC	(Germany) MH Rehberg	6	5	1
(Italy) L Musetti	6^{4}	7^{7}	6
(Serbia) D Lajović	7^{7}	6^{4}	3
(Finland) E Ruusuvuori	7	6
3	(Argentina) D Schwartzman	5	4
6	(Georgia (country)) N Basilashvili	4	0
A Karatsev	6	6
(Argentina) F Coria	6^{4}	4
Q	(Colombia) DE Galán	7^{7}	6
(Argentina) F Cerúndolo	2	6	6
(Germany) D Altmaier	6	4	2
LL	(Lithuania) R Berankis	3	4
2	A Rublev	6	6

Second round
(Spain) A Davidovich Fokina	6	6
Q	(Slovakia) J Kovalík	2	2
(Italy) L Musetti	6	7
(Finland) E Ruusuvuori	4	5
A Karatsev	3	6	6
Q	(Colombia) DE Galán	6	3	4
(Argentina) F Cerúndolo	6	6
2	A Rublev	4	2

Quarterfinals
(Spain) A Davidovich Fokina	4	3
(Italy) L Musetti	6	6
A Karatsev	3	6	6^{4}
(Argentina) F Cerúndolo	6	4	7^{7}

Semifinals
(Italy) L Musetti	6	7^{7}
(Argentina) F Cerúndolo	3	6^{3}

== Qualifying ==
=== Seeds ===
1. (Switzerland) Henri Laaksonen (first round)
2. (Lithuania) Ričardas Berankis (qualifying competition, lucky loser)
3. (Colombia) Daniel Elahi Galán (second round)
4. (Italy) Stefano Travaglia (first round)
5. (France) Manuel Guinard (first round)
6. Alexander Shevchenko (qualifying competition)
7. (Italy) Luca Nardi (first round)
8. (Italy) Riccardo Bonadio (qualifying competition)

=== Qualifiers ===
1. (Slovakia) Jozef Kovalík
2. (Italy) Luca Nardi
3. (Colombia) Daniel Elahi Galán
4. (Germany) Marko Topo

=== Lucky loser ===
1. (Lithuania) Ričardas Berankis

=== Qualifying draw ===
==== First qualifier ====
First round
1	(Switzerland) Henri Laaksonen	4	1
(Slovakia) Jozef Kovalík	6	6
Alt	(Spain) Eduard Esteve Lobato	0	3
6	Alexander Shevchenko	6	6

Qualifying competition
(Slovakia) Jozef Kovalík	7^{8}	4	6
6	Alexander Shevchenko	6^{6}	6	4

==== Second qualifier ====
First round
2	(Lithuania) Ričardas Berankis	6	7^{7}
WC	(Germany) Mats Rosenkranz	4	6^{5}
PR	(Portugal) Pedro Sousa	1^{r}
7	(Italy) Luca Nardi	4

Qualifying competition
2	(Lithuania) Ričardas Berankis	5	2
7	(Italy) Luca Nardi	7	6

==== Third qualifier ====
First round
3	(Colombia) Daniel Elahi Galán	6	6^{5}	6
(Switzerland) Johan Nikles	3	7^{7}	1
Alt	Alexey Vatutin	5	1
8	(Italy) Riccardo Bonadio	7	6

Qualifying competition
3	(Colombia) Daniel Elahi Galán	7	6
8	(Italy) Riccardo Bonadio	5	1

==== Fourth qualifier ====
First round
4	(Italy) Stefano Travaglia	2	2
WC	(Germany) Marko Topo	6	6
WC	(Germany) Rudolf Molleker	3	6	7^{10}
5	(France) Manuel Guinard	6	4	6^{8}

Qualifying competition
WC	(Germany) Marko Topo	6	3	6
WC	(Germany) Rudolf Molleker	3	6	4
