= 1999 Gold Flake Open =

- Date: 5–12 April
- Edition: 4th
- Category: World Series
- Draw: 32S / 16D
- Prize money: $405,000
- Surface: Hard / outdoor
- Location: Chennai, India

Champions

Singles
- (Zimbabwe) Byron Black

Doubles
- (India) Leander Paes / (India) Mahesh Bhupathi
← 1998 ·	Maharashtra Open	· 2000 →

The 1999 Gold Flake Open was a men's tennis tournament played on outdoor hard courts in Chennai, India, that was part of the World Series of the 1999 ATP Tour. It was the fourth edition of the tournament and was held from 5 April until 12 April 1999. Fourth-seeded Byron Black won the singles title.

== Finals ==
=== Singles ===
(Zimbabwe) Byron Black defeated (Germany) Rainer Schüttler, 6–4, 1–6, 6–3.

- It was Black's only singles title of the year and the 2nd and last of his career.

=== Doubles ===
(India) Leander Paes / (India) Mahesh Bhupathi defeated (Zimbabwe) Wayne Black / (South Africa) Neville Godwin, 4–6, 7–5, 6–4.

- It was Paes's 2nd title of the year and the 15th of his career. It was Bhupathi's 2nd title of the year and the 13th of his career.
