= 1999 Gold Flake Open – Singles =

Singles
- 1999 Gold Flake Open

Final
- Champion: (Zimbabwe) Byron Black
- Runner-up: (Germany) Rainer Schüttler
- Score: 6–4, 1–6, 6–3

Details
- Draw: 32
- Seeds: 8

Events
Singles	Doubles
← 1998 ·	Gold Flake Open	· 2000 →

Byron Black defeated Rainer Schüttler 6–4, 1–6, 6–3 to win the 1999 Chennai Open singles event. Patrick Rafter was the defending champion but did not defend his title.

== Seeds ==
1. (Spain) Carlos Moyà (quarterfinals)
2. (Slovakia) Karol Kučera (second round)
3. (Sweden) Thomas Johansson (first round)
4. (Zimbabwe) Byron Black (champion)
5. (Australia) Andrew Ilie (second round)
6. (Netherlands) Sjeng Schalken (first round)
7. (Germany) Rainer Schüttler (final)
8. (Netherlands) John van Lottum (semifinals)

== Draw ==
=== Key ===
- Q = Qualifier
- WC = Wild card
- LL = Lucky loser
- Alt = Alternate
- ITF = ITF entry
- PR = Protected ranking
- SR = Special ranking
- SE = Special exempt
- JE = Junior exempt
- JR = Junior Accelerator Programme entrant
- CO = College Accelerator Programme entrant
- NG = Next Gen Accelerator Program entrant
- w/o = Walkover
- r = Retired
- d = Defaulted

=== Finals ===
Semifinals
7	(Germany) Rainer Schüttler	6	6
(Netherlands) Peter Wessels	1	3
4	(Zimbabwe) Byron Black	6	6
8	(Netherlands) John van Lottum	1	1

Final
7	(Germany) Rainer Schüttler	4	6	3
4	(Zimbabwe) Byron Black	6	1	6

=== Section 1 ===
First round
1	(Spain) C Moyà	4	6	6
(Belarus) V Voltchkov	6	3	3
(Zimbabwe) W Black	7^{8}	6
(United States) P Goldstein	6^{6}	1
WC	(Sweden) A Vinciguerra	6^{2}	6	6
(Brazil) A Sá	7^{7}	2	1
Q	(Argentina) G Etlis	6^{5}	1
7	(Germany) R Schüttler	7^{7}	6
3	(Sweden) T Johansson	4	0^{r}
(Armenia) S Sargsian	6	3
(Netherlands) P Wessels	4	6	7
Q	(Czech Republic) O Fukárek	6	4	5
(Italy) V Santopadre	2	6	6
(United States) G Grant	6	3	4
(Netherlands) D van Scheppingen	3	6	2
5	(Australia) A Ilie	6	3	6

Second round
1	(Spain) C Moyà	6	1	7
(Zimbabwe) W Black	3	6	5
WC	(Sweden) A Vinciguerra	1	2
7	(Germany) R Schüttler	6	6
(Armenia) S Sargsian	6^{5}	7^{8}	4
(Netherlands) P Wessels	7^{7}	6^{6}	6
(Italy) V Santopadre	6	5	6
5	(Australia) A Ilie	2	7	3

Quarterfinals
1	(Spain) C Moyà	1	0^{r}
7	(Germany) R Schüttler	6	3
(Netherlands) P Wessels	6	6
(Italy) V Santopadre	2	4

Semifinals
7	(Germany) R Schüttler	6	6
(Netherlands) P Wessels	1	3

=== Section 2 ===
First round
6	(Netherlands) S Schalken	6	3	1
(Germany) L Burgsmüller	4	6	6
(Australia) R Fromberg	6	7
WC	(India) M Bhupathi	2	5
(India) L Paes	4	6	6
Q	(Argentina) A Zingman	6	3	4
Q	(France) G Carraz	1	3
4	(Zimbabwe) B Black	6	6
8	(Netherlands) J van Lottum	6	6
(Germany) J Knippschild	3	4
(France) N Escudé	2	7^{7}	2
WC	(United States) J Stark	6	6^{2}	6
(Sweden) M Tillström	6	6
(Bulgaria) O Stanoytchev	4	4
(Germany) M Kohlmann	5	1
2	(Slovakia) K Kučera	7	6

Second round
(Germany) L Burgsmüller	4	6	2
(Australia) R Fromberg	6	1	6
(India) L Paes	3	2
4	(Zimbabwe) B Black	6	6
8	(Netherlands) J van Lottum	7^{14}	0	7^{8}
WC	(United States) J Stark	6^{12}	6	6^{6}
(Sweden) M Tillström	7	4	6
2	(Slovakia) K Kučera	5	6	2

Quarterfinals
(Australia) R Fromberg	4	2
4	(Zimbabwe) B Black	6	6
8	(Netherlands) J van Lottum	4	6	6
(Sweden) M Tillström	6	3	2

Semifinals
4	(Zimbabwe) B Black	6	6
8	(Netherlands) J van Lottum	1	1
