= 1998 Gold Flake Open – Singles =

Singles
- 1998 Gold Flake Open

Final
- Champion: (Australia) Patrick Rafter
- Runner-up: (Sweden) Mikael Tillström
- Score: 6–3, 6–4

Details
- Draw: 32
- Seeds: 8

Events
Singles	Doubles
← 1997 ·	Gold Flake Open	· 1999 →

Patrick Rafter defeated Mikael Tillström 6–3, 6–4 to win the 1998 Chennai Open singles event. Tillström was the defending champion.

== Seeds ==
1. (Australia) Patrick Rafter (champion)
2. (Australia) Todd Woodbridge (semifinals)
3. (Australia) Mark Woodforde (quarterfinals)
4. (Germany) Boris Becker (second round)
5. (Sweden) Mikael Tillström (final)
6. (France) Jérôme Golmard (second round)
7. (France) Arnaud Clément (second round)
8. (Romania) Andrei Pavel (quarterfinals)

== Draw ==
=== Key ===
- Q = Qualifier
- WC = Wild card
- LL = Lucky loser
- Alt = Alternate
- SE = Special exempt
- PR = Protected ranking
- ITF = ITF entry
- JE = Junior exempt
- w/o = Walkover
- r = Retired
- d = Defaulted
- SR = Special ranking

=== Finals ===
Semifinals
1	(Australia) Patrick Rafter	6	7^{7}
(India) Leander Paes	3	6^{5}
5	(Sweden) Mikael Tillström	6	6
2	(Australia) Todd Woodbridge	2	2

Final
1	(Australia) Patrick Rafter	6	6
5	(Sweden) Mikael Tillström	3	4

=== Section 1 ===
First round
1	(Australia) P Rafter	6	6
(Bulgaria) O Stanoytchev	2	1
Q	(Australia) P Tramacchi	2	5
(Switzerland) I Heuberger	6	7
(United States) M Sell	0	2
(Germany) L Burgsmüller	6	6
(United Kingdom) A Richardson	2	0
7	(France) A Clément	6	6
4	(Germany) B Becker	7^{7}	7^{7}
Q	(Belarus) V Voltchkov	6^{5}	6^{4}
(France) G Solvès	7^{9}	6
Q	(United States) J Salzenstein	6^{7}	4
(India) L Paes	6	6
WC	(Germany) B Phau	2	2
WC	(South Africa) W Whitehouse	3	3
6	(France) J Golmard	6	6

Second round
1	(Australia) P Rafter	6	6
(Switzerland) I Heuberger	2	4
(Germany) L Burgsmüller	6	6
7	(France) A Clément	3	2
4	(Germany) B Becker	6	3	2
(France) G Solvès	4	6	6
(India) L Paes	7^{7}	2	3
6	(France) J Golmard	6^{4}	6	1^{r}

Quarterfinals
1	(Australia) P Rafter	7^{7}	0	7
(Germany) L Burgsmüller	6^{3}	6	5
(France) G Solvès	7^{7}	4	5
(India) L Paes	6^{3}	6	7

Semifinals
1	(Australia) P Rafter	6	7^{7}
(India) L Paes	3	6^{5}

=== Section 2 ===
First round
5	(Sweden) M Tillström	6	6
(Uzbekistan) O Ogorodov	1	0
(Italy) D Scala	1	3
(France) O Delaître	6	6
(Austria) S Koubek	1	3
(Germany) R Schüttler	6	6
Q	(South Africa) D Nainkin	2	4
3	(Australia) M Woodforde	6	6
8	(Romania) A Pavel	7^{7}	6
(United States) J Stark	6^{4}	4
(Australia) A Belobrajdic	6	6
(Czech Republic) P Luxa	4	3
(Italy) C Caratti	6	6
(Italy) V Santopadre	4	0
WC	(India) M Bhupathi	6	4	4
2	(Australia) T Woodbridge	3	6	6

Second round
5	(Sweden) M Tillström	7	6
(France) O Delaître	5	3
(Germany) R Schüttler	4	2
3	(Australia) M Woodforde	6	6
8	(Romania) A Pavel	6	6
(Australia) A Belobrajdic	4	0
(Italy) C Caratti	0	7^{7}	2
2	(Australia) T Woodbridge	6	6^{5}	6

Quarterfinals
5	(Sweden) M Tillström	6	2	7^{7}
3	(Australia) M Woodforde	3	6	6^{3}
8	(Romania) A Pavel	4	4
2	(Australia) T Woodbridge	6	6

Semifinals
5	(Sweden) M Tillström	6	6
2	(Australia) T Woodbridge	2	2
