= Julien Boutter =

French tennis player (born 1974)

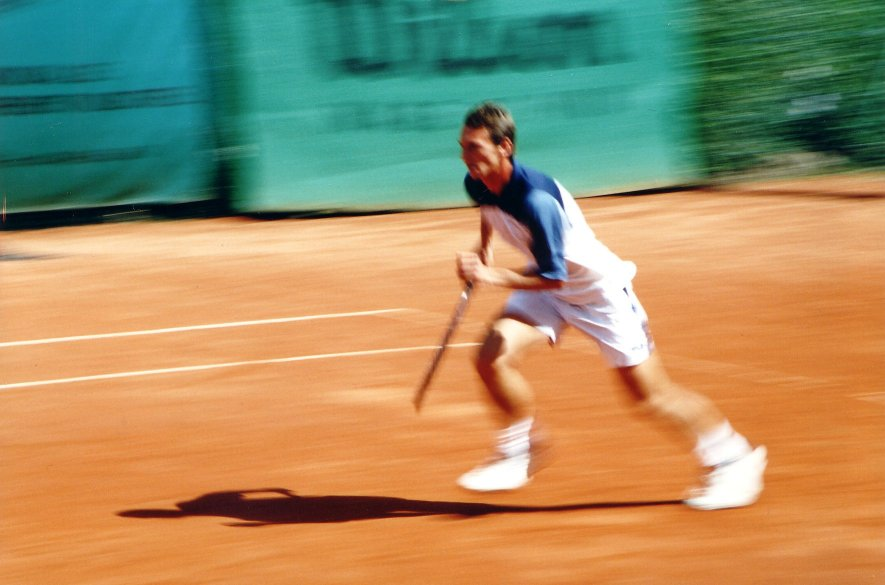
- Country (sports): France
- Residence: Arlon, Belgium
- Born: 5 April 1974 (age 51) Boulay-Moselle, France
- Height: 1.90 m (6 ft 3 in)
- Turned pro: 1996
- Retired: 2005
- Plays: Right-handed (one-handed backhand)
- Prize money: $1,430,283

Singles
- Career record: 62–84 (at ATP Tour level, Grand Slam level, and in Davis Cup)
- Career titles: 1
- Highest ranking: No. 46 (20 May 2002)

Grand Slam singles results
- Australian Open: 2R (2001, 2002)
- French Open: 2R (1998, 2001)
- Wimbledon: 1R (2000, 2001, 2002, 2003, 2004)
- US Open: 2R (2000)

Doubles
- Career record: 51–54 (at ATP Tour level, Grand Slam level, and in Davis Cup)
- Career titles: 4
- Highest ranking: No. 26 (26 August 2002)

Grand Slam doubles results
- Australian Open: SF (2002)
- French Open: 3R (2000)
- Wimbledon: 3R (2002)
- US Open: 2R (2000, 2002)

Julien Boutter (French: [ʒyljɛ̃ bute]; born 5 April 1974) is a former professional male tennis player from France.

== Career ==
At the 2002 Australian Open, Boutter defeated No. 2 seed and former World No. 1 Gustavo Kuerten, despite being down two sets, 3–6, 4–6, 7–5, 6–3, 6–3.

In his career, he won one singles title (2003 Casablanca) and reached the Milan final in 2001, where he lost to future 20-time major winner Roger Federer in what was the latter's first tour victory. He reached two Master Series quarterfinals at Hamburg in 2002 and Monte Carlo in 2003.

In doubles, he reached the semi-finals of the 2002 Australian Open partnering fellow Frenchman Arnaud Clément, only to lose to Michaël Llodra and Fabrice Santoro 3–6, 6–3, 10–12. During the match, Boutter led an impromptu funeral ceremony for a bird inadvertently hit by Llodra as it was chasing a moth.

== Career finals ==
=== Singles: 2 (1–1) ===
Legend Grand Slam Tournaments (0–0) Tennis Masters Cup (0–0) ATP Masters Series (0–0) ATP International Series Gold (0–0) ATP International Series (1–1)	Finals by surface Hard (0–0) Clay (1–0) Grass (0–0) Carpet (0–1)

Result	W/L	Date	Tournament	Surface	Opponent	Score
Loss	0–1	Jan 2001	Milan, Italy	Carpet (i)	(Switzerland) Roger Federer	4–6, 7–6^{(9–7)}, 4–6
Win	1–1	Apr 2003	Casablanca, Morocco	Clay	(Morocco) Younes El Aynaoui	6–2, 2–6, 6–1

=== Doubles: 6 (4–2) ===
Legend Grand Slam Tournaments (0–0) Tennis Masters Cup (0–0) ATP Masters Series (0–0) ATP International Series Gold (0–0) ATP International Series (4–2)	Finals by surface Hard (4–1) Clay (0–0) Grass (0–0) Carpet (0–1)

Result	W/L	Date	Tournament	Surface	Partner	Opponents	Score
Win	1–0	Jan 2000	Chennai, India	Hard	(Belgium) Christophe Rochus	(India) Saurav Panja (India) Srinath Prahlad	7–5, 6–1
Win	2–0	Oct 2000	Toulouse, France	Hard (i)	(France) Fabrice Santoro	(United States) Donald Johnson (South Africa) Piet Norval	7–6^{(10–8)}, 4–6, 7–6^{(7–5)}
Win	3–0	Feb 2001	Marseille, France	Hard (i)	(France) Fabrice Santoro	(Australia) Michael Hill (United States) Jeff Tarango	7–6^{(9–7)}, 7–5
Win	4–0	Sep 2001	Tashkent, Uzbekistan	Hard	(Slovakia) Dominik Hrbatý	(South Africa) Marius Barnard (United States) Jim Thomas	6–4, 3–6, [13–11]
Loss	4–1	Jan 2002	Milan, Italy	Carpet (i)	(Belarus) Max Mirnyi	(Germany) Karsten Braasch (Russia) Andrei Olhovskiy	6–3, 6–7^{(5–7)}, [10–12]
Loss	4–2	Feb 2002	Marseille, France	Hard (i)	(Belarus) Max Mirnyi	(France) Arnaud Clément (France) Nicolas Escudé	4–6, 3–6

== Challengers and Futures finals ==
=== Singles: 7 (3–4) ===
Legend (singles)
Challengers (3–2)
Futures (0–2)

Outcome	No.	Date	Tournament	Surface	Opponent in the final	Score in the final
Runner-up	1.	9 February 1998	Bergheim, Austria	Carpet (i)	(Bulgaria) Ivaylo Traykov	3–6, 2–6
Runner-up	2.	27 April 1998	Esslingen, Germany	Clay	(Spain) Jordi Mas-Rodriguez	2–6, 2–6
Runner-up	3.	28 December 1998	Mumbai, India	Hard	(France) Antony Dupuis	5–7, 6–7
Winner	1.	1 March 1999	Grenoble, France	Hard (i)	(France) Antony Dupuis	6–2, 4–6, 6–4
Runner-up	4.	14 June 1999	Zagreb, Croatia	Clay	(Italy) Andrea Gaudenzi	1–6, 4–6
Winner	2.	28 February 2000	Cherbourg, France	Hard (i)	(Russia) Mikhail Youzhny	6–1, 6–0
Winner	3.	6 March 2000	Besançon, France	Hard (i)	(Austria) Julian Knowle	6–4, 7–6^{4}

=== Doubles: 5 (2–3) ===
Legend
Challengers (2–1)
Futures (0–2)

Outcome	No.	Date	Tournament	Surface	Partner	Opponents in the final	Score in the final
Runner-up	1.	21 July 1997	Ostend, Belgium	Clay	(France) Tarik Benhabiles	(Belgium) Kris Goossens (Belgium) Tom Vanhoudt	6–3, 4–6, 0–6
Runner-up	2.	9 February 1998	Bergheim, Austria	Carpet (i)	(France) Jean-Michel Pequery	(Germany) Markus Menzler (Germany) Markus Wislsperger	6–4, 1–6, 0–6
Runner-up	3.	27 April 1998	Esslingen, Germany	Clay	(France) Jean-René Lisnard	(Argentina) Federico Browne (Argentina) Martín García	6–7, 2–6
Winner	1.	28 February 2000	Cherbourg, France	Hard (i)	(France) Michaël Llodra	(France) Julien Benneteau (France) Nicolas Mahut	2–6, 6–4, 7–5
Winner	2.	6 March 2000	Besançon, France	Hard (i)	(France) Michaël Llodra	(Italy) Stefano Pescosolido (Italy) Vincenzo Santopadre	6–4, ^{6}6–7, 7–6^{5}
