= Christophe Rochus =

Belgian tennis player (born 1978)

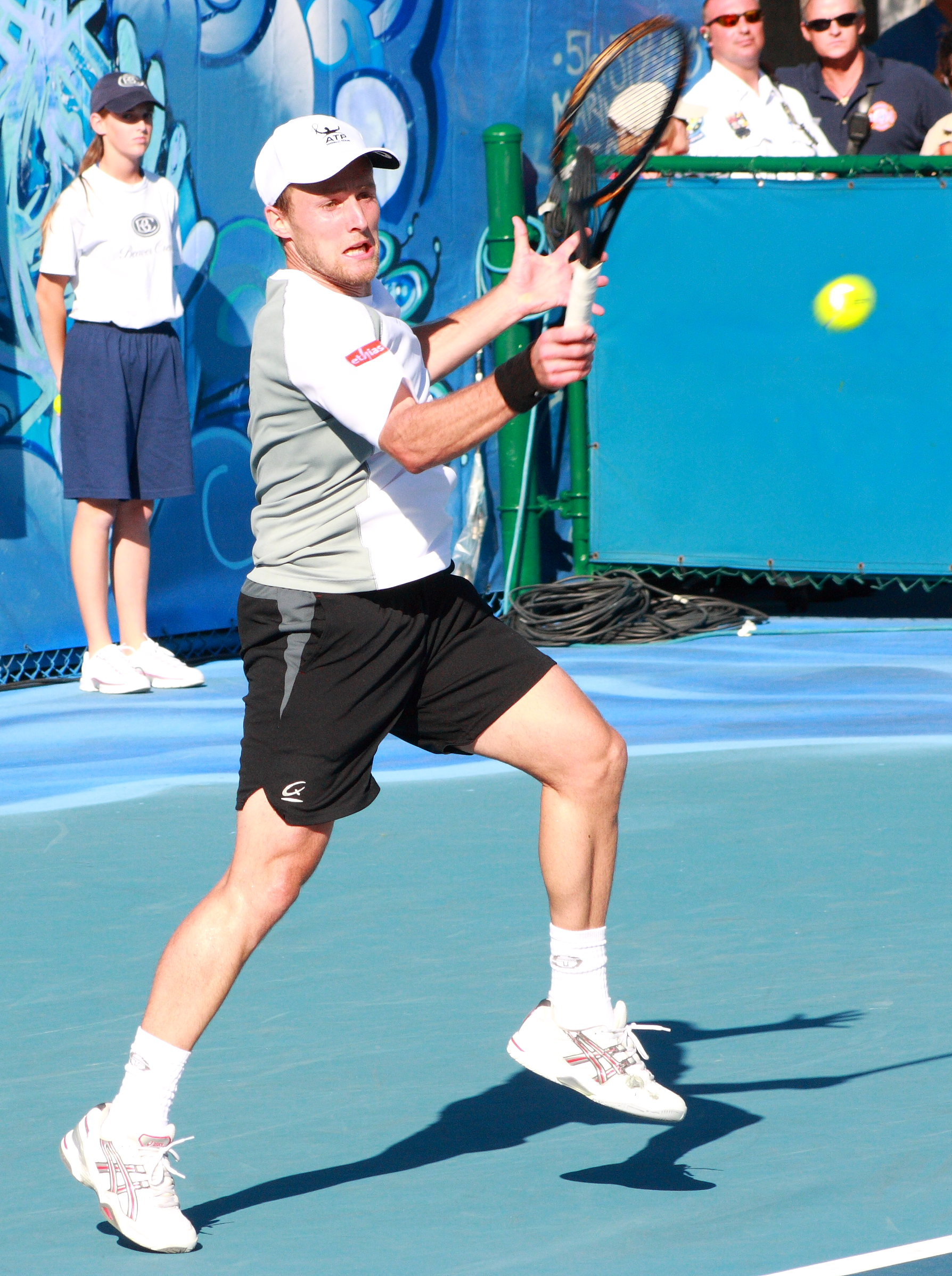
- Country (sports): Belgium
- Residence: Auvelais, Belgium
- Born: 15 December 1978 (age 47) Namur, Belgium
- Height: 1.70 m (5 ft 7 in)
- Turned pro: 1996
- Retired: 2009
- Plays: Right-handed (two-handed backhand)
- Prize money: $2,753,294

Singles
- Career record: 118–219
- Career titles: 0
- Highest ranking: No. 38 (1 May 2006)

Grand Slam singles results
- Australian Open: 4R (2000)
- French Open: 3R (2009)
- Wimbledon: 2R (2000)
- US Open: 2R (2001)

Doubles
- Career record: 34–73
- Career titles: 1
- Highest ranking: No. 62 (15 May 2006)

Grand Slam doubles results
- Australian Open: 3R (2006)
- French Open: 2R (2009)
- Wimbledon: 1R (2005, 2006, 2009)
- US Open: 1R (2005, 2006, 2009)
- Last updated on: 19 August 2021.

Christophe Rochus (French: [kʁis.tɔf ʁɔkys]; born 15 December 1978) is a retired professional male tennis player from Belgium. Rochus' career-high singles ranking was world No. 38, achieved in May 2006.

== Personal information ==
Rochus is the older brother of Olivier Rochus.

== Career ==
He reached the semifinals of the Hamburg Masters in 2005 and was runner-up in two ATP tournaments, the 2003 Valencia Open and 2006 Rotterdam Open.

== ATP career finals ==
=== Singles: 2 (2 runner-ups) ===
Legend Grand Slam tournaments (0–0) ATP World Tour Finals (0–0) ATP World Tour Masters 1000 (0–0) ATP World Tour 500 Series (0–1) ATP World Tour 250 Series (0–1)	Titles by surface Hard (0–1) Clay (0–1) Grass (0–0) Carpet (0–0)	Titles by setting Outdoor (0–1) Indoor (0–1)

Result	W–L	Date	Tournament	Tier	Surface	Opponent	Score
Loss	0–1	Apr 2003	Valencia, Spain	250 Series	Clay	(Spain) Juan Carlos Ferrero	2–6, 4–6
Loss	0–2	Feb 2006	Rotterdam, Netherlands	500 Series	Hard	(Czech Republic) Radek Štěpánek	0–6, 3–6

=== Doubles: 3 (1 title, 2 runner-ups) ===
Legend Grand Slam tournaments (0–0) ATP World Tour Finals (0–0) ATP World Tour Masters 1000 (0–0) ATP World Tour 500 Series (0–0) ATP World Tour 250 Series (1–2)	Titles by surface Hard (1–1) Clay (0–1) Grass (0–0) Carpet (0–0)	Titles by setting Outdoor (1–2) Indoor (0–0)

Result	W–L	Date	Tournament	Tier	Surface	Partner	Opponents	Score
Win	1–0	Jan 2000	Chennai, India	250 Series	Hard	(France) Julien Boutter	(India) Saurav Panja (India) Srinath Prahlad	7–5, 6–1
Loss	1–1	Jul 2005	Kitzbühel, Austria	250 Series	Clay	(Belgium) Olivier Rochus	(Czech Republic) Leoš Friedl (Romania) Andrei Pavel	2–6, 7–6^{(7–5)}, 0–6
Loss	1–2	Jan 2006	Doha, Qatar	250 Series	Hard	(Belgium) Olivier Rochus	(Sweden) Jonas Björkman (Belarus) Max Mirnyi	6–2, 3–6, [8–10]

== Performance timelines ==
Key
W	F	SF	QF	#R	RR	Q#	P#	DNQ	A	Z#	PO	G	S	B	NMS	NTI	P	NH

(W) winner; (F) finalist; (SF) semifinalist; (QF) quarterfinalist; (#R) rounds 4, 3, 2, 1; (RR) round-robin stage; (Q#) qualification round; (P#) preliminary round; (DNQ) did not qualify; (A) absent; (Z#) Davis/Fed Cup Zonal Group (with number indication) or (PO) play-off; (G) gold, (S) silver or (B) bronze Olympic/Paralympic medal; (NMS) not a Masters tournament; (NTI) not a Tier I tournament; (P) postponed; (NH) not held; (SR) strike rate (events won / competed); (W–L) win–loss record.
To avoid confusion and double counting, these charts are updated at the conclusion of a tournament or when the player's participation has ended.

=== Singles ===
Tournament	1998	1999	2000	2001	2002	2003	2004	2005	2006	2007	2008	2009	2010	SR	W–L	Win %
Grand Slam tournaments
Australian Open	A	Q2	4R	3R	2R	2R	1R	2R	1R	1R	Q2	1R	1R	0 / 10	8–10	44%
French Open	Q2	1R	1R	1R	1R	2R	2R	1R	2R	1R	Q1	3R	Q1	0 / 10	5–10	33%
Wimbledon	A	A	2R	1R	1R	1R	1R	1R	1R	Q3	1R	1R	Q1	0 / 9	1–9	10%
US Open	A	Q3	1R	2R	Q1	1R	A	1R	1R	A	A	1R	A	0 / 6	1–6	14%
Win–loss	0–0	0–1	4–4	3–4	1–3	2–4	1–3	1–4	1–4	0–2	0–1	2–4	0–1	0 / 35	15–35	30%
ATP World Tour Masters 1000
Indian Wells	A	A	Q2	A	A	A	A	A	1R	1R	A	1R	1R	0 / 4	0–4	0%
Miami	A	A	2R	A	1R	1R	A	1R	4R	1R	A	1R	1R	0 / 8	4–8	33%
Monte Carlo	A	A	Q1	A	A	Q1	A	1R	1R	A	A	1R	A	0 / 3	0–3	0%
Madrid	Not Held				A	1R	A	2R	A	A	A	A	1R	0 / 3	1–3	25%
Rome	A	A	A	A	Q1	A	Q1	A	A	A	A	2R	A	0 / 1	1–1	50%
Hamburg	A	A	Q1	Q1	Q2	A	A	SF	2R	A	A	NMS		0 / 2	5–2	71%
Canada Masters	A	A	A	A	A	A	A	1R	A	A	A	A	A	0 / 1	0–1	0%
Cincinnati	A	A	A	A	A	A	A	1R	A	A	A	A	A	0 / 1	0–1	0%
Stuttgart	A	A	A	Q1	Not Held									0 / 0	0–0	–
Cincinnati	A	A	1R	3R	A	Q2	2R	1R	2R	A	A	A	A	0 / 5	4–5	44%
Win–loss	0–0	0–0	1–2	2–1	0–1	0–2	1–1	5–7	5–5	0–2	0–0	1–4	0–3	0 / 28	15–28	35%

=== Doubles ===
Tournament	2005	2006	2007	2008	2009	2010	SR	W–L	Win %
Grand Slam tournaments
Australian Open	A	3R	A	A	1R	1R	0 / 3	2–3	25%
French Open	1R	1R	A	A	2R	A	0 / 3	1–3	25%
Wimbledon	1R	1R	A	A	1R	A	0 / 3	0–3	0%
US Open	1R	1R	A	A	1R	A	0 / 3	0–3	0%
Win–loss	0–3	2–4	0–0	0–0	1–4	0–1	0 / 12	3–12	20%

== ATP Challenger and ITF Futures finals ==
=== Singles: 16 (6–10) ===
Legend ATP Challenger (5–10) ITF Futures (1–0)	Finals by surface Hard (1–3) Clay (5–7) Grass (0–0) Carpet (0–0)

Result	W–L	Date	Tournament	Tier	Surface	Opponent	Score
Win	1–0	May 1998	Great Britain F5, Hatfield	Futures	Clay	(United Kingdom) Luke Milligan	6–4, 6–7, 6–1
Loss	1–1	Nov 1998	Puebla, Mexico	Challenger	Hard	(Belarus) Vladimir Voltchkov	3–6, 3–6
Loss	1–2	Oct 1999	Cairo, Egypt	Challenger	Clay	(Morocco) Karim Alami	3–6, 1–6
Win	2–2	Aug 2000	Poznań, Poland	Challenger	Clay	(Romania) Adrian Voinea	6–4, 3–6, 7–6^{(7–4)}
Loss	2–3	Jun 2001	Biella, Italy	Challenger	Clay	(Romania) Adrian Voinea	6–3, 3–6, 4–6
Win	3–3	Jul 2001	Venice, Italy	Challenger	Clay	(France) Nicolas Coutelot	6–7^{(5–7)}, 7–5, 6–4
Loss	3–4	Mar 2004	Saint-Brieuc, France	Challenger	Clay	(France) Olivier Mutis	1–6, 6–4, 2–6
Loss	3–5	Aug 2004	Geneva, Switzerland	Challenger	Clay	(Switzerland) Stan Wawrinka	6–4, 4–6, ret.
Loss	3–6	Feb 2005	Besançon, France	Challenger	Hard	(France) Gaël Monfils	3–6, 6–2, 3–6
Win	4–6	Nov 2005	Luxembourg, Luxembourg	Challenger	Hard	(Switzerland) George Bastl	6–2, 3–6, 6–1
Loss	4–7	Sep 2007	Como, Italy	Challenger	Clay	(Argentina) Máximo González	6–7^{(5–7)}, 4–6
Win	5–7	Apr 2008	Saint-Brieuc, France	Challenger	Clay	(Spain) Marcel Granollers	6–2, 4–6, 6–1
Loss	5–8	May 2008	Rijeka, Croatia	Challenger	Clay	(Chile) Nicolás Massú	2–6, 2–6
Win	6–8	May 2008	Zagreb, Croatia	Challenger	Clay	(Argentina) Carlos Berlocq	6–3, 6–4
Loss	6–9	Aug 2008	Manerbio, Italy	Challenger	Clay	(Romania) Victor Crivoi	6–7^{(10–12)}, 2–6
Loss	6–10	Sep 2008	Orleans, France	Challenger	Hard	(France) Nicolas Mahut	7–5, 1–6, 6–7^{(2–7)}

=== Doubles: 7 (3–4) ===
Legend ATP Challenger (2–3) ITF Futures (1–1)	Finals by surface Hard (0–0) Clay (3–4) Grass (0–0) Carpet (0–0)

Result	W–L	Date	Tournament	Tier	Surface	Partner	Opponents	Score
Loss	0–1	Jul 1998	Tampere, Finland	Challenger	Clay	(Austria) Julian Knowle	(Sweden) Tobias Hildebrand (Sweden) Fredrik Lovén	6–7, 6–1, 0–6
Loss	0–2	Aug 1998	Belgium F1, Louvain-la-Neuve	Futures	Clay	(Belgium) Olivier Rochus	(France) Nicolas Coutelot (France) Johann Potron	3–6, 6–2, 2–6
Loss	0–3	Apr 2003	Napoli, Italy	Challenger	Clay	(Israel) Amir Hadad	(Italy) Massimo Bertolini (Italy) Giorgio Galimberti	6–2, 5–7, 4–6
Win	1–3	Mar 2004	Saint-Brieuc, France	Challenger	Clay	(Belgium) Tom Vanhoudt	(Czech Republic) David Škoch (Czech Republic) Jiří Vaněk	6–0, 6–1
Loss	1–4	Aug 2004	Cordenons, Italy	Challenger	Clay	(Italy) Andrea Merati	(Italy) Leonardo Azzaro (Hungary) Kornél Bardóczky	2–6, 0–6
Win	2–4	Jun 2010	Lugano, Switzerland	Challenger	Clay	(Portugal) Fred Gil	(Mexico) Santiago González (United States) Travis Rettenmaier	7–5, 7–6^{(7–3)}
Win	3–4	Oct 2011	Chile F9, Talca	Futures	Clay	(Belgium) Germain Gigounon	(Chile) Guillermo Hormazábal (Chile) Cristóbal Saavedra Corvalán	7–5, 6–2
