= Srinath Prahlad =

Indian tennis player

- Country (sports): India
- Born: 8 January 1973 (age 52)
- Height: 1.85 m (6 ft 1 in)
- Turned pro: 1997
- Plays: Right-handed
- Prize money: $42,470

Singles
- Career record: 0–5
- Career titles: 0
- Highest ranking: No. 310 (25 October 1999)

Grand Slam singles results
- Australian Open: -
- French Open: -
- Wimbledon: -
- US Open: -

Doubles
- Career record: 4–4
- Career titles: 0
- Highest ranking: No. 223 (21 February 2000)
Medal record
Representing India
Asian Games
Bronze medal – third place	1998 Bangkok	Singles
Bronze medal – third place	1998 Bangkok	Team
- Last updated on: 20 October 2008.

Srinath Prahlad (born 8 January 1973) is an Indian former tennis player. He won two bronze medals at the 1998 Asian Games and competed in the Davis Cup. He reached one ATP doubles final partnering fellow Indian Saurav Panja at the 2000 Chennai Open but lost 7–5, 6–1 to Julien Boutter and Christophe Rochus. He started an academy named SAT Sports at Bangalore.
