= Saurav Panja =

Indian tennis player

- Country (sports): India
- Born: 15 March 1977 (age 48); Kolkata, India
- Plays: Right-handed
- Prize money: $13,164

Singles
- Career record: 0–0 (at ATP Tour level, Grand Slam level, and in Davis Cup)
- Career titles: 0
- Highest ranking: No. 863 (12 July 1999)

Doubles
- Career record: 3–2 (at ATP Tour level, Grand Slam level, and in Davis Cup)
- Career titles: 1 ITF
- Highest ranking: No. 290 (10 July 2000)
- Last updated on: 8 March 2021.

Saurav Panja (born 15 March 1977) is an Indian former tennis player.

Panja has a career high ATP singles ranking of 863 achieved on 12 July 1999. He also has a career high ATP doubles ranking of 290 achieved on 10 July 2000.

Panja reached the doubles final of the 2000 Gold Flake Open with Srinath Prahlad.
