= 2001 ATP Tour =

Men's tennis circuit

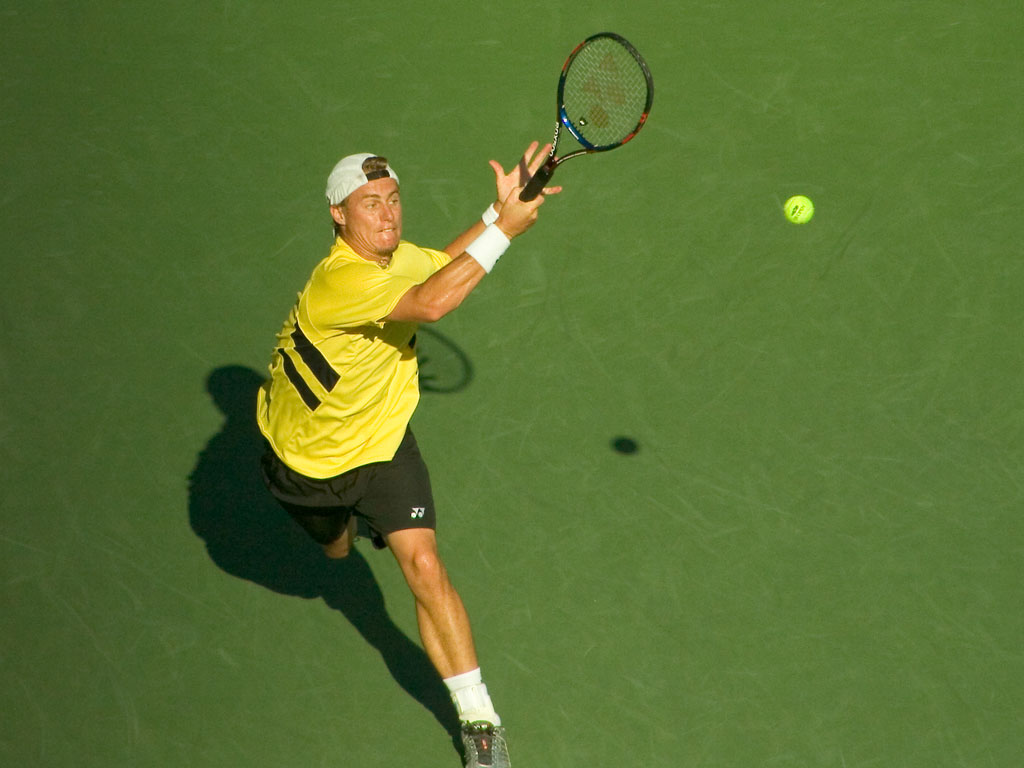
- Lleyton Hewitt finished the year ranked world No. 1 for the first time in his career, becoming the then-youngest man to do so. He won six tournaments during the season, including a major at the US Open, as well as the Tennis Masters Cup.

Details
- Duration: December 30, 2000 – November 12, 2001
- Edition: 32nd
- Tournaments: 70

Achievements (singles)
- Most titles: (Australia) Lleyton Hewitt (6) (Brazil) Gustavo Kuerten (6)
- Most finals: (Brazil) Gustavo Kuerten (8)
- Prize money leader: (Australia) Lleyton Hewitt ($3,770,618)
- Points leader: (Australia) Lleyton Hewitt (4,365)

Awards
- Player of the year: (Australia) Lleyton Hewitt
- Doubles team of the year: (Sweden) Jonas Björkman (Australia) Todd Woodbridge
- Most improved player of the year: (Croatia) Goran Ivanišević
- Newcomer of the year: (United States) Andy Roddick
- Comeback player of the year: (Argentina) Guillermo Cañas

The ATP Tour is the elite tour for professional tennis organized by the ATP. The 2001 ATP Tour included the four Grand Slam tournaments, the Tennis Masters Cup, the Tennis Masters Series, the International Series Gold and the International Series.

== Schedule and results ==
This is the complete schedule of events on the 2001 ATP Tour, with player progression documented from the quarterfinal stage.

Key

Grand Slam
Tennis Masters Cup
Tennis Masters Series
ATP International Series Gold
ATP International Series
Team Events

=== January ===
Week	Tournament	Champions	Runners-up	Semifinalists	Quarterfinalists
1 Jan	Hopman Cup; Perth, Australia; ITF Mixed Team Championships; Hard (i) – 8 teams (RR)	Switzerland; 2–1	United States	Round Robin losers (Group A) South Africa; Thailand; Australia	Round Robin losers (Group B) Russia; Slovakia; Belgium
1 Jan	2001 AAPT Championships; Adelaide, Australia; ATP International Series $375,000 – hard Singles – Doubles	(Germany) Tommy Haas; 6–3, 6–1	(Chile) Nicolás Massú	(Australia) Jason Stoltenberg (United Kingdom) Tim Henman	(Australia) Lleyton Hewitt (Spain) Alberto Martín (Croatia) Ivan Ljubičić (Sweden) Thomas Johansson
1 Jan	2001 AAPT Championships; Adelaide, Australia; ATP International Series $375,000 – hard Singles – Doubles	(Australia) David MacPherson (South Africa) Grant Stafford; 6–7^{(5–7)}, 6–4, 6–4	(Australia) Wayne Arthurs (Australia) Todd Woodbridge	(Australia) Jason Stoltenberg (United Kingdom) Tim Henman	(Australia) Lleyton Hewitt (Spain) Alberto Martín (Croatia) Ivan Ljubičić (Sweden) Thomas Johansson
1 Jan	2001 Gold Flake Open; Chennai, India; ATP International Series $400,000 – hard Singles – Doubles	(Czech Republic) Michal Tabara; 6–2, 7–6^{(7–4)}	(Russia) Andrei Stoliarov	(Denmark) Kristian Pless (Spain) Tommy Robredo	(Romania) Adrian Voinea (France) Cédric Pioline (France) Cyril Saulnier (Netherlands) Peter Wessels
1 Jan	2001 Gold Flake Open; Chennai, India; ATP International Series $400,000 – hard Singles – Doubles	(Zimbabwe) Byron Black (Zimbabwe) Wayne Black; 6–4, 6–3	(United Kingdom) Barry Cowan (Italy) Mosé Navarra	(Denmark) Kristian Pless (Spain) Tommy Robredo	(Romania) Adrian Voinea (France) Cédric Pioline (France) Cyril Saulnier (Netherlands) Peter Wessels
1 Jan	2001 Qatar ExxonMobil Open; Doha, Qatar; ATP International Series $1,000,000 – hard Singles – Doubles	(Chile) Marcelo Ríos; 6–3, 2–6, 6–3	(Czech Republic) Bohdan Ulihrach	(France) Nicolas Escudé (Belarus) Vladimir Voltchkov	(Russia) Yevgeny Kafelnikov (Morocco) Hicham Arazi (Spain) Fernando Vicente (Germany) Nicolas Kiefer
1 Jan	2001 Qatar ExxonMobil Open; Doha, Qatar; ATP International Series $1,000,000 – hard Singles – Doubles	(The Bahamas) Mark Knowles (Canada) Daniel Nestor; 6–1, 6–3	(Spain) Juan Balcells (Russia) Andrei Olhovskiy	(France) Nicolas Escudé (Belarus) Vladimir Voltchkov	(Russia) Yevgeny Kafelnikov (Morocco) Hicham Arazi (Spain) Fernando Vicente (Germany) Nicolas Kiefer
8 Jan	2001 Heineken Open; Auckland, New Zealand; ATP International Series $375,000 – hard Singles – Doubles	(Slovakia) Dominik Hrbatý; 6–4, 2–6, 6–3	(Spain) Francisco Clavet	(United Kingdom) Greg Rusedski (Spain) Juan Balcells	(Austria) Stefan Koubek (United States) Jan-Michael Gambill (United States) Glenn Weiner (Sweden) Thomas Johansson
8 Jan	2001 Heineken Open; Auckland, New Zealand; ATP International Series $375,000 – hard Singles – Doubles	(South Africa) Marius Barnard (United States) Jim Thomas; 7–6^{(12–10)}, 6–4	(South Africa) David Adams (Argentina) Martín García	(United Kingdom) Greg Rusedski (Spain) Juan Balcells	(Austria) Stefan Koubek (United States) Jan-Michael Gambill (United States) Glenn Weiner (Sweden) Thomas Johansson
8 Jan	2001 Adidas International; Sydney, Australia; ATP International Series $400,000 – hard Singles – Doubles	(Australia) Lleyton Hewitt; 6–4, 6–1	(Sweden) Magnus Norman	(Sweden) Jonas Björkman (France) Sébastien Grosjean	(Switzerland) George Bastl (Germany) Rainer Schüttler (Switzerland) Roger Federer (France) Fabrice Santoro
8 Jan	2001 Adidas International; Sydney, Australia; ATP International Series $400,000 – hard Singles – Doubles	(Canada) Daniel Nestor (Australia) Sandon Stolle; 2–6, 7–6, 7–6	(Sweden) Jonas Björkman (Australia) Todd Woodbridge	(Sweden) Jonas Björkman (France) Sébastien Grosjean	(Switzerland) George Bastl (Germany) Rainer Schüttler (Switzerland) Roger Federer (France) Fabrice Santoro
15 Jan; 22 Jan	2001 Australian Open; Melbourne, Australia; Grand Slam $3,568,313 – hard 128S/128Q/64D/32X; Singles – Doubles; Mixed doubles	(United States) Andre Agassi; 6–4, 6–2, 6–2	(France) Arnaud Clément	(France) Sébastien Grosjean (Australia) Patrick Rafter	(Russia) Yevgeny Kafelnikov (Spain) Carlos Moyà (United States) Todd Martin (Slovakia) Dominik Hrbatý
15 Jan; 22 Jan	2001 Australian Open; Melbourne, Australia; Grand Slam $3,568,313 – hard 128S/128Q/64D/32X; Singles – Doubles; Mixed doubles	(Sweden) Jonas Björkman (Australia) Todd Woodbridge; 6–1, 5–7, 6–4, 6–4	(Zimbabwe) Byron Black (Germany) David Prinosil	(France) Sébastien Grosjean (Australia) Patrick Rafter	(Russia) Yevgeny Kafelnikov (Spain) Carlos Moyà (United States) Todd Martin (Slovakia) Dominik Hrbatý
15 Jan; 22 Jan	2001 Australian Open; Melbourne, Australia; Grand Slam $3,568,313 – hard 128S/128Q/64D/32X; Singles – Doubles; Mixed doubles	(South Africa) Ellis Ferreira (United States) Corina Morariu; 6–1, 6–3	(Australia) Joshua Eagle (Austria) Barbara Schett	(France) Sébastien Grosjean (Australia) Patrick Rafter	(Russia) Yevgeny Kafelnikov (Spain) Carlos Moyà (United States) Todd Martin (Slovakia) Dominik Hrbatý
29 Jan	2001 Cerveza Club Colombia Open; Bogotá, Colombia; ATP International Series $400,000 – clay Singles – Doubles	(Spain) Fernando Vicente; 6–4, 7–6^{(8–6)}	(Argentina) Juan Ignacio Chela	(Spain) Juan Albert Viloca (Brazil) Alexandre Simoni	(Colombia) Mauricio Hadad (Argentina) David Nalbandian (Argentina) Guillermo Coria (Russia) Andrei Stoliarov
29 Jan	2001 Cerveza Club Colombia Open; Bogotá, Colombia; ATP International Series $400,000 – clay Singles – Doubles	(Argentina) Mariano Hood (Argentina) Sebastián Prieto; 6–2, 6–4	(Argentina) Martín Rodríguez (Brazil) André Sá	(Spain) Juan Albert Viloca (Brazil) Alexandre Simoni	(Colombia) Mauricio Hadad (Argentina) David Nalbandian (Argentina) Guillermo Coria (Russia) Andrei Stoliarov
29 Jan	2001 Milan Indoor; Milan, Italy; ATP International Series $400,000 – carpet (i); Singles – Doubles	(Switzerland) Roger Federer; 6–4, 6–7^{(7–9)}, 6–4	(France) Julien Boutter	(United Kingdom) Greg Rusedski (Russia) Yevgeny Kafelnikov	(Russia) Marat Safin (United States) Jan-Michael Gambill (Croatia) Goran Ivanišević (Belarus) Vladimir Voltchkov
29 Jan	2001 Milan Indoor; Milan, Italy; ATP International Series $400,000 – carpet (i); Singles – Doubles	(Netherlands) Paul Haarhuis (Netherlands) Sjeng Schalken; 7–6^{(7–5)}, 7–6^{(7–4)}	(Sweden) Johan Landsberg (Belgium) Tom Vanhoudt	(United Kingdom) Greg Rusedski (Russia) Yevgeny Kafelnikov	(Russia) Marat Safin (United States) Jan-Michael Gambill (Croatia) Goran Ivanišević (Belarus) Vladimir Voltchkov

=== February ===
Week	Tournament	Champions	Runners-up	Semifinalists	Quarterfinalists
5 Feb	Davis Cup by BNP Paribas First Round; Perth, Australia – grass Rio de Janeiro, Brazil – clay (red); Helsingborg, Sweden – carpet (i); Bratislava, Slovakia – hard (i); Ghent, Belgium – clay (red) (i); Basel, Switzerland – hard (i); Braunschweig, Germany – carpet (i); Eindhoven, Netherlands – carpet (i)	First-round winners Australia 4–1; Brazil 4–1; Sweden 3–2; Russia 3–2; France 5–0; Switzerland 3–2; Germany 3–2; Netherlands 4–1	First-round losers Ecuador; Morocco; Czech Republic; Slovakia; Belgium; United States; Romania; Spain		
12 Feb	2001 Copenhagen Open; Copenhagen, Denmark; ATP International Series $350,000 – hard (i); Singles – Doubles	(United Kingdom) Tim Henman; 6–3, 6–4	(Sweden) Andreas Vinciguerra	(Netherlands) Jan Siemerink (Russia) Mikhail Youzhny	(Czech Republic) Bohdan Ulihrach (Philippines) Cecil Mamiit (Germany) Lars Burgsmüller (Sweden) Magnus Gustafsson
12 Feb	2001 Copenhagen Open; Copenhagen, Denmark; ATP International Series $350,000 – hard (i); Singles – Doubles	(Zimbabwe) Wayne Black (Zimbabwe) Kevin Ullyett; 6–3, 6–3	(Czech Republic) Jiří Novák (Czech Republic) David Rikl	(Netherlands) Jan Siemerink (Russia) Mikhail Youzhny	(Czech Republic) Bohdan Ulihrach (Philippines) Cecil Mamiit (Germany) Lars Burgsmüller (Sweden) Magnus Gustafsson
12 Feb	2001 Open 13; Marseille, France; ATP International Series $500,000 – hard (i); Singles – Doubles	(Russia) Yevgeny Kafelnikov; 7–6^{(7–5)}, 6–2	(France) Sébastien Grosjean	(Belarus) Max Mirnyi (Switzerland) Roger Federer	(France) Julien Boutter (Slovakia) Karol Kučera (Switzerland) Michel Kratochvil (France) Cédric Pioline
12 Feb	2001 Open 13; Marseille, France; ATP International Series $500,000 – hard (i); Singles – Doubles	(France) Julien Boutter (France) Fabrice Santoro; 7–6^{(9–7)}, 7–5	(Australia) Michael Hill (United States) Jeff Tarango	(Belarus) Max Mirnyi (Switzerland) Roger Federer	(France) Julien Boutter (Slovakia) Karol Kučera (Switzerland) Michel Kratochvil (France) Cédric Pioline
12 Feb	2001 Chevrolet Cup; Viña del Mar, Chile; ATP International Series $375,000 – clay Singles – Doubles	(Argentina) Guillermo Coria; 4–6, 6–2, 7–5	(Argentina) Gastón Gaudio	(Argentina) Mariano Zabaleta (Spain) Albert Portas	(Spain) Alberto Martín (Spain) Feliciano López (Spain) Francisco Clavet (Argentina) David Nalbandian
12 Feb	2001 Chevrolet Cup; Viña del Mar, Chile; ATP International Series $375,000 – clay Singles – Doubles	(Argentina) Lucas Arnold Ker (Spain) Tomás Carbonell; 6–4, 2–6, 6–3	(Argentina) Mariano Hood (Argentina) Sebastián Prieto	(Argentina) Mariano Zabaleta (Spain) Albert Portas	(Spain) Alberto Martín (Spain) Feliciano López (Spain) Francisco Clavet (Argentina) David Nalbandian
19 Feb	2001 Kroger St. Jude International; Memphis, USA; ATP International Series Gold $800,000 – hard (i); Singles – Doubles	(Australia) Mark Philippoussis; 6–3, 6–7^{(5–7)}, 6–3	(Italy) Davide Sanguinetti	(Canada) Sébastien Lareau (Germany) Tommy Haas	(United States) Chris Woodruff (Australia) Jason Stoltenberg (United States) Jan-Michael Gambill (Russia) Dmitry Tursunov
19 Feb	2001 Kroger St. Jude International; Memphis, USA; ATP International Series Gold $800,000 – hard (i); Singles – Doubles	(United States) Bob Bryan (United States) Mike Bryan; 6–3, 7–6^{(7–3)}	(United States) Alex O'Brien (United States) Jonathan Stark	(Canada) Sébastien Lareau (Germany) Tommy Haas	(United States) Chris Woodruff (Australia) Jason Stoltenberg (United States) Jan-Michael Gambill (Russia) Dmitry Tursunov
19 Feb	2001 ABN AMRO World Tennis Tournament; Rotterdam, Netherlands; ATP International Series Gold $850,000 – hard (i); Singles – Doubles	(France) Nicolas Escudé; 7–5, 3–6, 7–6^{(7–5)}	(Switzerland) Roger Federer	(Belarus) Vladimir Voltchkov (Romania) Andrei Pavel	(Sweden) Andreas Vinciguerra (Croatia) Ivan Ljubičić (Spain) Àlex Corretja (Germany) Nicolas Kiefer
19 Feb	2001 ABN AMRO World Tennis Tournament; Rotterdam, Netherlands; ATP International Series Gold $850,000 – hard (i); Singles – Doubles	(Sweden) Jonas Björkman (Switzerland) Roger Federer; 6–3, 6–0	(Czech Republic) Petr Pála (Czech Republic) Pavel Vízner	(Belarus) Vladimir Voltchkov (Romania) Andrei Pavel	(Sweden) Andreas Vinciguerra (Croatia) Ivan Ljubičić (Spain) Àlex Corretja (Germany) Nicolas Kiefer
19 Feb	2001 Copa AT&T; Buenos Aires, Argentina; ATP International Series $625,000 – clay Singles – Doubles	(Brazil) Gustavo Kuerten; 6–1, 6–3	(Argentina) José Acasuso	(Spain) Fernando Vicente (Argentina) Gastón Gaudio	(Argentina) Guillermo Cañas (Austria) Markus Hipfl (Argentina) Guillermo Coria (Argentina) Franco Squillari
19 Feb	2001 Copa AT&T; Buenos Aires, Argentina; ATP International Series $625,000 – clay Singles – Doubles	(Argentina) Lucas Arnold Ker (Spain) Tomás Carbonell; 5–7, 7–5, 7–6^{(7–5)}	(Argentina) Mariano Hood (Argentina) Sebastián Prieto	(Spain) Fernando Vicente (Argentina) Gastón Gaudio	(Argentina) Guillermo Cañas (Austria) Markus Hipfl (Argentina) Guillermo Coria (Argentina) Franco Squillari
26 Feb	2001 Abierto Mexicano Pegaso; Acapulco, Mexico; ATP International Series Gold $800,000 – clay Singles – Doubles	(Brazil) Gustavo Kuerten; 6–4, 6–2	(Spain) Galo Blanco	(Argentina) Guillermo Cañas (Spain) Carlos Moyà	(Brazil) Fernando Meligeni (Argentina) Gastón Gaudio (Spain) Sergi Bruguera (Norway) Christian Ruud
26 Feb	2001 Abierto Mexicano Pegaso; Acapulco, Mexico; ATP International Series Gold $800,000 – clay Singles – Doubles	(United States) Donald Johnson (Brazil) Gustavo Kuerten; 6–3, 7–6^{(7–5)}	(South Africa) David Adams (Argentina) Martín García	(Argentina) Guillermo Cañas (Spain) Carlos Moyà	(Brazil) Fernando Meligeni (Argentina) Gastón Gaudio (Spain) Sergi Bruguera (Norway) Christian Ruud
26 Feb	2001 Dubai Tennis Championships; Dubai, United Arab Emirates; ATP International Series Gold $1,000,000 – hard Singles – Doubles	(Spain) Juan Carlos Ferrero; 6–2, 3–1, ret.	(Russia) Marat Safin	(Sweden) Thomas Johansson (Slovakia) Dominik Hrbatý	(Ukraine) Andrei Medvedev (Belarus) Max Mirnyi (Germany) Lars Burgsmüller (Sweden) Magnus Norman
26 Feb	2001 Dubai Tennis Championships; Dubai, United Arab Emirates; ATP International Series Gold $1,000,000 – hard Singles – Doubles	(Australia) Joshua Eagle (Australia) Sandon Stolle; 6–4, 6–4	(Canada) Daniel Nestor (Federal Republic of Yugoslavia) Nenad Zimonjić	(Sweden) Thomas Johansson (Slovakia) Dominik Hrbatý	(Ukraine) Andrei Medvedev (Belarus) Max Mirnyi (Germany) Lars Burgsmüller (Sweden) Magnus Norman
26 Feb	2001 Sybase Open; San Jose, USA; ATP International Series $400,000 – hard (i); Singles – Doublesa	(United Kingdom) Greg Rusedski; 6–3, 6–4	(United States) Andre Agassi	(United States) Jan-Michael Gambill (Belgium) Xavier Malisse	(Armenia) Sargis Sargsian (Spain) Juan Balcells (Germany) Tommy Haas (Australia) Lleyton Hewitt
26 Feb	2001 Sybase Open; San Jose, USA; ATP International Series $400,000 – hard (i); Singles – Doublesa	(The Bahamas) Mark Knowles (United States) Brian MacPhie; 6–3, 7–6^{(7–4)}	(United States) Jan-Michael Gambill (United States) Jonathan Stark	(United States) Jan-Michael Gambill (Belgium) Xavier Malisse	(Armenia) Sargis Sargsian (Spain) Juan Balcells (Germany) Tommy Haas (Australia) Lleyton Hewitt

=== March ===
Week	Tournament	Champions	Runners-up	Semifinalists	Quarterfinalists
5 Mar	Delray Beach International Tennis Championships; Delray Beach, USA; ATP International Series $350,000 – hard Singles – Doubles	(United States) Jan-Michael Gambill; 7–5, 6–4	(Belgium) Xavier Malisse	(Australia) Wayne Arthurs (Netherlands) Peter Wessels	(Australia) Patrick Rafter (United States) Chris Woodruff (Netherlands) Edwin Kempes (France) Fabrice Santoro
5 Mar	Delray Beach International Tennis Championships; Delray Beach, USA; ATP International Series $350,000 – hard Singles – Doubles	(United States) Jan-Michael Gambill (United States) Andy Roddick; 6–3, 6–4	(Japan) Thomas Shimada (South Africa) Myles Wakefield	(Australia) Wayne Arthurs (Netherlands) Peter Wessels	(Australia) Patrick Rafter (United States) Chris Woodruff (Netherlands) Edwin Kempes (France) Fabrice Santoro
5 Mar	Franklin Templeton Classic; Scottsdale, USA; ATP International Series $400,000 – hard Singles – Doubles	(Spain) Francisco Clavet; 6–4, 6–2	(Sweden) Magnus Norman	(Israel) Harel Levy (Australia) Lleyton Hewitt	(United Kingdom) Tim Henman (United States) Mardy Fish (Chile) Marcelo Ríos (Chile) Nicolás Massú
5 Mar	Franklin Templeton Classic; Scottsdale, USA; ATP International Series $400,000 – hard Singles – Doubles	(United States) Donald Johnson (United States) Jared Palmer; 7–6^{(7–3)}, 6–2	(Chile) Marcelo Ríos (Netherlands) Sjeng Schalken	(Israel) Harel Levy (Australia) Lleyton Hewitt	(United Kingdom) Tim Henman (United States) Mardy Fish (Chile) Marcelo Ríos (Chile) Nicolás Massú
12 Mar	Indian Wells Masters; Indian Wells, USA; Tennis Masters Series $2,450,000 – hard Singles – Doubles	(United States) Andre Agassi; 7–6^{(7–5)}, 7–5, 6–1	(United States) Pete Sampras	(Russia) Yevgeny Kafelnikov (Australia) Lleyton Hewitt	(United States) Jan-Michael Gambill (Australia) Patrick Rafter (Ecuador) Nicolás Lapentti (France) Nicolas Escudé
12 Mar	Indian Wells Masters; Indian Wells, USA; Tennis Masters Series $2,450,000 – hard Singles – Doubles	(South Africa) Wayne Ferreira (Russia) Yevgeny Kafelnikov; 6–2, 7–5	(Sweden) Jonas Björkman (Australia) Todd Woodbridge	(Russia) Yevgeny Kafelnikov (Australia) Lleyton Hewitt	(United States) Jan-Michael Gambill (Australia) Patrick Rafter (Ecuador) Nicolás Lapentti (France) Nicolas Escudé
19 Mar; 26 Mar	Ericsson Open; Key Biscayne, USA; Tennis Masters Series $2,900,000 – hard Singles – Doubles	(United States) Andre Agassi; 7–6^{(7–4)}, 6–1, 6–0	(United States) Jan-Michael Gambill	(Australia) Patrick Rafter (Australia) Lleyton Hewitt	(Switzerland) Roger Federer (Croatia) Ivan Ljubičić (United States) Andy Roddick (Argentina) Gastón Gaudio
19 Mar; 26 Mar	Ericsson Open; Key Biscayne, USA; Tennis Masters Series $2,900,000 – hard Singles – Doubles	(Czech Republic) Jiří Novák (Czech Republic) David Rikl; 7–5, 7–6^{(7–3)}	(Sweden) Jonas Björkman (Australia) Todd Woodbridge	(Australia) Patrick Rafter (Australia) Lleyton Hewitt	(Switzerland) Roger Federer (Croatia) Ivan Ljubičić (United States) Andy Roddick (Argentina) Gastón Gaudio

=== April ===
Week	Tournament	Champions	Runners-up	Semifinalists	Quarterfinalists
2 Apr	Davis Cup quarterfinals Florianópolis, Brazil – clay (red); Malmö, Sweden – hard (i); Neuchâtel, Switzerland – carpet (i) 's-Hertogenbosch, Netherlands – carpet (i)	Quarterfinal winners Australia 4–1; Sweden 4–1; France 3–2; Netherlands 4–1	Quarterfinal losers Brazil; Russia; Switzerland; Germany		
9 Apr	Grand Prix Hassan II; Casablanca, Morocco; ATP International Series $350,000 – clay Singles – Doubles	(Argentina) Guillermo Cañas; 7–5, 6–2	(Spain) Tommy Robredo	(Morocco) Younes El Aynaoui (Spain) Sergi Bruguera	(Argentina) Mariano Zabaleta (Spain) Germán Puentes (Italy) Andrea Gaudenzi (Hungary) Attila Sávolt
9 Apr	Grand Prix Hassan II; Casablanca, Morocco; ATP International Series $350,000 – clay Singles – Doubles	(Australia) Michael Hill (United States) Jeff Tarango; 7–6^{(7–2)}, 6–3	(Argentina) Pablo Albano (Australia) David MacPherson	(Morocco) Younes El Aynaoui (Spain) Sergi Bruguera	(Argentina) Mariano Zabaleta (Spain) Germán Puentes (Italy) Andrea Gaudenzi (Hungary) Attila Sávolt
9 Apr	Estoril Open; Oeiras, Portugal; ATP International Series $625,000 – clay Singles – Doubles	(Spain) Juan Carlos Ferrero; 7–6^{(7–3)}, 4–6, 6–3	(Spain) Félix Mantilla	(Spain) Albert Portas (Romania) Andrei Pavel	(Spain) Albert Montañés (Slovakia) Dominik Hrbatý (Argentina) Franco Squillari (Austria) Markus Hipfl
9 Apr	Estoril Open; Oeiras, Portugal; ATP International Series $625,000 – clay Singles – Doubles	(Czech Republic) Radek Štěpánek (Czech Republic) Michal Tabara; 6–4, 6–2	(United States) Donald Johnson (Federal Republic of Yugoslavia) Nenad Zimonjić	(Spain) Albert Portas (Romania) Andrei Pavel	(Spain) Albert Montañés (Slovakia) Dominik Hrbatý (Argentina) Franco Squillari (Austria) Markus Hipfl
16 Apr	Monte Carlo Masters; Roquebrune-Cap-Martin, France; Tennis Masters Series $2,450,000 – clay Singles – Doubles	(Brazil) Gustavo Kuerten; 6–3, 6–2, 6–4	(Morocco) Hicham Arazi	(France) Sébastien Grosjean (Argentina) Guillermo Coria	(Switzerland) Roger Federer (United Kingdom) Tim Henman (Spain) Alberto Martín (Netherlands) Sjeng Schalken
16 Apr	Monte Carlo Masters; Roquebrune-Cap-Martin, France; Tennis Masters Series $2,450,000 – clay Singles – Doubles	(Sweden) Jonas Björkman (Australia) Todd Woodbridge; 3–6, 6–4, 6–2	(Australia) Joshua Eagle (Australia) Andrew Florent	(France) Sébastien Grosjean (Argentina) Guillermo Coria	(Switzerland) Roger Federer (United Kingdom) Tim Henman (Spain) Alberto Martín (Netherlands) Sjeng Schalken
23 Apr	Open SEAT Godó; Barcelona, Spain; ATP International Series Gold $1,000,000 – clay Singles – Doubles	(Spain) Juan Carlos Ferrero; 4–6, 7–5, 6–3, 3–6, 7–5	(Spain) Carlos Moyà	(Sweden) Thomas Enqvist (Switzerland) Michel Kratochvil	(Italy) Federico Luzzi (Spain) Àlex Corretja (Spain) Félix Mantilla (Spain) Albert Portas
23 Apr	Open SEAT Godó; Barcelona, Spain; ATP International Series Gold $1,000,000 – clay Singles – Doubles	(United States) Donald Johnson (United States) Jared Palmer; 7–6^{(7–2)}, 6–4	(Spain) Tommy Robredo (Spain) Fernando Vicente	(Sweden) Thomas Enqvist (Switzerland) Michel Kratochvil	(Italy) Federico Luzzi (Spain) Àlex Corretja (Spain) Félix Mantilla (Spain) Albert Portas
23 Apr	Verizon Tennis Challenge; Atlanta, US; ATP International Series $400,000 – clay Singles – Doubles	(United States) Andy Roddick; 6–2, 6–4	(Belgium) Xavier Malisse	(France) Jérôme Golmard (Austria) Stefan Koubek	(Belgium) Christophe Rochus (Australia) Andrew Ilie (South Korea) Hyung-Taik Lee (Brazil) Fernando Meligeni
23 Apr	Verizon Tennis Challenge; Atlanta, US; ATP International Series $400,000 – clay Singles – Doubles	(India) Mahesh Bhupathi (India) Leander Paes; 6–3, 7–6^{(9–7)}	(United States) Rick Leach (Australia) David MacPherson	(France) Jérôme Golmard (Austria) Stefan Koubek	(Belgium) Christophe Rochus (Australia) Andrew Ilie (South Korea) Hyung-Taik Lee (Brazil) Fernando Meligeni
30 Apr	U.S. Men's Clay Court Championships; Houston, US; ATP International Series; Clay – $350,000 – 32S/16D; Singles – Doubles	(United States) Andy Roddick; 7–5, 6–3	(South Korea) Hyung-Taik Lee	(France) Jérôme Golmard (Czech Republic) Michal Tabara	(Austria) Stefan Koubek (Czech Republic) Jiří Vaněk (Belgium) Olivier Rochus (Australia) Andrew Ilie
30 Apr	U.S. Men's Clay Court Championships; Houston, US; ATP International Series; Clay – $350,000 – 32S/16D; Singles – Doubles	(India) Mahesh Bhupathi (India) Leander Paes; 7–6^{(7–4)}, 6–2	(United States) Kevin Kim (United States) Jim Thomas	(France) Jérôme Golmard (Czech Republic) Michal Tabara	(Austria) Stefan Koubek (Czech Republic) Jiří Vaněk (Belgium) Olivier Rochus (Australia) Andrew Ilie
30 Apr	Majorca Open; Mallorca, Spain; ATP International Series $500,000 – clay Singles – Doubles	(Spain) Alberto Martín; 6–3, 3–6, 6–2	(Argentina) Guillermo Coria	(Spain) Juan Balcells (Spain) Carlos Moyà	(Argentina) Agustín Calleri (Costa Rica) Juan Antonio Marín (Germany) Nicolas Kiefer (Czech Republic) Slava Doseděl
30 Apr	Majorca Open; Mallorca, Spain; ATP International Series $500,000 – clay Singles – Doubles	(United States) Donald Johnson (United States) Jared Palmer; 7–5, 6–3	(Spain) Feliciano López (Spain) Francisco Roig	(Spain) Juan Balcells (Spain) Carlos Moyà	(Argentina) Agustín Calleri (Costa Rica) Juan Antonio Marín (Germany) Nicolas Kiefer (Czech Republic) Slava Doseděl
30 Apr	BMW Open; Munich, Germany; ATP International Series $400,000 – clay Singles – Doubles	(Czech Republic) Jiří Novák; 6–4, 7–5	(France) Antony Dupuis	(Morocco) Younes El Aynaoui (Czech Republic) Bohdan Ulihrach	(Germany) Tomas Behrend (Brazil) Flávio Saretta (Argentina) Franco Squillari (Australia) Wayne Arthurs
30 Apr	BMW Open; Munich, Germany; ATP International Series $400,000 – clay Singles – Doubles	(Czech Republic) Petr Luxa (Czech Republic) Radek Štěpánek; 5–7, 6–2, 7–6^{(7–5)}	(Brazil) Jaime Oncins (Argentina) Daniel Orsanic	(Morocco) Younes El Aynaoui (Czech Republic) Bohdan Ulihrach	(Germany) Tomas Behrend (Brazil) Flávio Saretta (Argentina) Franco Squillari (Australia) Wayne Arthurs

=== May ===
Week	Tournament	Champions	Runners-up	Semifinalists	Quarterfinalists
7 May	2001 Rome Masters; Rome, Italy; Tennis Masters Series $2,450,000 – clay Singles – Doubles	(Spain) Juan Carlos Ferrero; 3–6, 6–1, 2–6, 6–4, 6–2	(Brazil) Gustavo Kuerten	(Sweden) Andreas Vinciguerra (Ecuador) Nicolás Lapentti	(Spain) Àlex Corretja (Israel) Harel Levy (Spain) Jacobo Díaz (South Africa) Wayne Ferreira
7 May	2001 Rome Masters; Rome, Italy; Tennis Masters Series $2,450,000 – clay Singles – Doubles	(South Africa) Wayne Ferreira (Russia) Yevgeny Kafelnikov; 6–4, 7–6^{(8–6)}	(Canada) Daniel Nestor (Australia) Sandon Stolle	(Sweden) Andreas Vinciguerra (Ecuador) Nicolás Lapentti	(Spain) Àlex Corretja (Israel) Harel Levy (Spain) Jacobo Díaz (South Africa) Wayne Ferreira
14 May	2001 Hamburg Masters; Hamburg, Germany; Tennis Masters Series $2,450,000 – clay Singles – Doubles	(Spain) Albert Portas; 4–6, 6–2, 0–6, 7–6^{(7–5)}, 7–5	(Spain) Juan Carlos Ferrero	(Spain) Albert Costa (Australia) Lleyton Hewitt	(Sweden) Thomas Johansson (France) Fabrice Santoro (Spain) Alberto Martín (Argentina) Franco Squillari
14 May	2001 Hamburg Masters; Hamburg, Germany; Tennis Masters Series $2,450,000 – clay Singles – Doubles	(Sweden) Jonas Björkman (Australia) Todd Woodbridge; 7–6^{(7–2)}, 3–6, 6–3	(Canada) Daniel Nestor (Australia) Sandon Stolle	(Spain) Albert Costa (Australia) Lleyton Hewitt	(Sweden) Thomas Johansson (France) Fabrice Santoro (Spain) Alberto Martín (Argentina) Franco Squillari
21 May	World Team Cup; Düsseldorf, Germany; World Team Cup $2,100,000 – clay Results	Australia; 2–1	Russia	United States; Spain; Sweden	France; Argentina; Germany
21 May	2001 International Raiffeisen Grand Prix; St. Poelten, Austria; ATP International Series $425,000 – clay Singles – Doubles	(Italy) Andrea Gaudenzi; 6–0, 7–5	(Austria) Markus Hipfl	(Czech Republic) Michal Tabara (Sweden) Magnus Gustafsson	(Croatia) Ivan Ljubičić (Belgium) Xavier Malisse (Netherlands) Jan Siemerink (Romania) Andrei Pavel
21 May	2001 International Raiffeisen Grand Prix; St. Poelten, Austria; ATP International Series $425,000 – clay Singles – Doubles	(Czech Republic) Petr Pála (Czech Republic) David Rikl; 6–3, 5–7, 7–5	(Brazil) Jaime Oncins (Argentina) Daniel Orsanic	(Czech Republic) Michal Tabara (Sweden) Magnus Gustafsson	(Croatia) Ivan Ljubičić (Belgium) Xavier Malisse (Netherlands) Jan Siemerink (Romania) Andrei Pavel
28 May; 4 Jun	2001 French Open; Paris, France; Grand Slam $4,458,217 – clay 128S/128Q/64D/32X; Singles – Doubles; Mixed doubles	(Brazil) Gustavo Kuerten; 6–7^{(3–7)}, 7–5, 6–2, 6–0	(Spain) Àlex Corretja	(Spain) Juan Carlos Ferrero (France) Sébastien Grosjean	(Russia) Yevgeny Kafelnikov (Australia) Lleyton Hewitt (United States) Andre Agassi (Switzerland) Roger Federer
28 May; 4 Jun	2001 French Open; Paris, France; Grand Slam $4,458,217 – clay 128S/128Q/64D/32X; Singles – Doubles; Mixed doubles	(India) Mahesh Bhupathi (India) Leander Paes; 7–6^{(7–5)}, 6–3	(Czech Republic) Petr Pála (Czech Republic) Pavel Vízner	(Spain) Juan Carlos Ferrero (France) Sébastien Grosjean	(Russia) Yevgeny Kafelnikov (Australia) Lleyton Hewitt (United States) Andre Agassi (Switzerland) Roger Federer
28 May; 4 Jun	2001 French Open; Paris, France; Grand Slam $4,458,217 – clay 128S/128Q/64D/32X; Singles – Doubles; Mixed doubles	(Spain) Tomás Carbonell (Spain) Virginia Ruano Pascual; 7–5, 6–3	(Brazil) Jaime Oncins (Argentina) Paola Suárez	(Spain) Juan Carlos Ferrero (France) Sébastien Grosjean	(Russia) Yevgeny Kafelnikov (Australia) Lleyton Hewitt (United States) Andre Agassi (Switzerland) Roger Federer

=== June ===
Week	Tournament	Champions	Runners-up	Semifinalists	Quarterfinalists
11 Jun	2001 Gerry Weber Open; Halle, NRW, Germany; ATP International Series $1,000,000 – grass Singles – Doubles	(Sweden) Thomas Johansson; 6–3, 6–7^{(5–7)}, 6–2	(France) Fabrice Santoro	(Russia) Yevgeny Kafelnikov (Australia) Patrick Rafter	(France) Nicolas Escudé (Sweden) Jonas Björkman (Germany) Lars Burgsmüller (Switzerland) Roger Federer
11 Jun	2001 Gerry Weber Open; Halle, NRW, Germany; ATP International Series $1,000,000 – grass Singles – Doubles	(Canada) Daniel Nestor (Australia) Sandon Stolle; 6–4, 6–7^{(5–7)}, 6–1	(Belarus) Max Mirnyi (Australia) Patrick Rafter	(Russia) Yevgeny Kafelnikov (Australia) Patrick Rafter	(France) Nicolas Escudé (Sweden) Jonas Björkman (Germany) Lars Burgsmüller (Switzerland) Roger Federer
11 Jun	2001 Stella Artois Championships; Queen's Club, London, UK; ATP International Series $800,000 – grass Singles – Doubles	(Australia) Lleyton Hewitt; 7–6^{(7–3)}, 7–6^{(7–3)}	(United Kingdom) Tim Henman	(South Africa) Wayne Ferreira (United States) Pete Sampras	(Netherlands) Peter Wessels (Thailand) Paradorn Srichaphan (United Kingdom) Greg Rusedski (United States) Jan-Michael Gambill
11 Jun	2001 Stella Artois Championships; Queen's Club, London, UK; ATP International Series $800,000 – grass Singles – Doubles	(United States) Bob Bryan (United States) Mike Bryan; 6–3, 3–6, 6–1	(United States) Eric Taino (United States) David Wheaton	(South Africa) Wayne Ferreira (United States) Pete Sampras	(Netherlands) Peter Wessels (Thailand) Paradorn Srichaphan (United Kingdom) Greg Rusedski (United States) Jan-Michael Gambill
18 Jun	2001 Heineken Trophy 's-Hertogenbosch, Netherlands; ATP International Series $400,000 – grass Singles – Doubles	(Australia) Lleyton Hewitt; 6–3, 6–4	(Argentina) Guillermo Cañas	(Switzerland) Roger Federer (Spain) Tommy Robredo	(Belgium) Gilles Elseneer (Netherlands) Raemon Sluiter (Belgium) Xavier Malisse (Netherlands) Sjeng Schalken
18 Jun	2001 Heineken Trophy 's-Hertogenbosch, Netherlands; ATP International Series $400,000 – grass Singles – Doubles	(Netherlands) Paul Haarhuis (Netherlands) Sjeng Schalken; 6–4, 6–4	(Czech Republic) Martin Damm (Czech Republic) Suk	(Switzerland) Roger Federer (Spain) Tommy Robredo	(Belgium) Gilles Elseneer (Netherlands) Raemon Sluiter (Belgium) Xavier Malisse (Netherlands) Sjeng Schalken
18 Jun	2001 Samsung Open; Nottingham, UK; ATP International Series $400,000 – grass Singles – Doubles	(Sweden) Thomas Johansson; 7–5, 6–3	(Israel) Harel Levy	(United Kingdom) Greg Rusedski (United States) Andy Roddick	(United Kingdom) Martin Lee (Australia) Wayne Arthurs (Switzerland) Michel Kratochvil (South Africa) Wayne Ferreira
18 Jun	2001 Samsung Open; Nottingham, UK; ATP International Series $400,000 – grass Singles – Doubles	(United States) Donald Johnson (United States) Jared Palmer; 6–4, 6–2	(Australia) Paul Hanley (Australia) Andrew Kratzmann	(United Kingdom) Greg Rusedski (United States) Andy Roddick	(United Kingdom) Martin Lee (Australia) Wayne Arthurs (Switzerland) Michel Kratochvil (South Africa) Wayne Ferreira
25 Jun; 2 Jul	2001 Wimbledon Championships; Wimbledon, London, UK; Grand Slam $5,476,166 – grass 128S/128Q/64D/64X; Singles – Doubles; Mixed doubles	(Croatia) Goran Ivanišević; 6–3, 3–6, 6–3, 2–6, 9–7	(Australia) Patrick Rafter	(United Kingdom) Tim Henman (United States) Andre Agassi	(Switzerland) Roger Federer (Russia) Marat Safin (Sweden) Thomas Enqvist (France) Nicolas Escudé
25 Jun; 2 Jul	2001 Wimbledon Championships; Wimbledon, London, UK; Grand Slam $5,476,166 – grass 128S/128Q/64D/64X; Singles – Doubles; Mixed doubles	(United States) Donald Johnson (United States) Jared Palmer; 6–4, 4–6, 6–3, 7–6^{(8–6)}	(Czech Republic) Jiří Novák (Czech Republic) David Rikl	(United Kingdom) Tim Henman (United States) Andre Agassi	(Switzerland) Roger Federer (Russia) Marat Safin (Sweden) Thomas Enqvist (France) Nicolas Escudé
25 Jun; 2 Jul	2001 Wimbledon Championships; Wimbledon, London, UK; Grand Slam $5,476,166 – grass 128S/128Q/64D/64X; Singles – Doubles; Mixed doubles	(Czech Republic) Leoš Friedl (Slovakia) Daniela Hantuchová; 4–6, 6–3, 6–2	(United States) Mike Bryan (South Africa) Liezel Huber	(United Kingdom) Tim Henman (United States) Andre Agassi	(Switzerland) Roger Federer (Russia) Marat Safin (Sweden) Thomas Enqvist (France) Nicolas Escudé

=== July ===
Week	Tournament	Champions	Runners-up	Semifinalists	Quarterfinalists
9 Jul	2001 Telenordia Swedish Open; Båstad, Sweden; ATP International Series $400,000 – clay Singles – Doubles	(Italy) Andrea Gaudenzi; 7–5, 6–3	(Czech Republic) Bohdan Ulihrach	(Sweden) Magnus Norman (Morocco) Younes El Aynaoui	(Belgium) Christophe Rochus (Spain) Albert Portas (Spain) Tommy Robredo (Czech Republic) Michal Tabara
9 Jul	2001 Telenordia Swedish Open; Båstad, Sweden; ATP International Series $400,000 – clay Singles – Doubles	(Germany) Karsten Braasch (Germany) Jens Knippschild; 7–6^{(7–3)}, 4–6, 7–6^{(7–5)}	(Sweden) Simon Aspelin (Australia) Andrew Kratzmann	(Sweden) Magnus Norman (Morocco) Younes El Aynaoui	(Belgium) Christophe Rochus (Spain) Albert Portas (Spain) Tommy Robredo (Czech Republic) Michal Tabara
9 Jul	2001 UBS Open; Gstaad, Switzerland; ATP International Series $600,00 – clay Singles – Doubles	(Czech Republic) Jiří Novák; 6–1, 6–7^{(5–7)}, 7–5	(Spain) Juan Carlos Ferrero	(Spain) Àlex Corretja (France) Sébastien Grosjean	(Switzerland) Michel Kratochvil (Croatia) Ivan Ljubičić (Argentina) Franco Squillari (France) Cédric Pioline
9 Jul	2001 UBS Open; Gstaad, Switzerland; ATP International Series $600,00 – clay Singles – Doubles	(Switzerland) Roger Federer (Russia) Marat Safin; 1–0 ret.	(Australia) Michael Hill (United States) Jeff Tarango	(Spain) Àlex Corretja (France) Sébastien Grosjean	(Switzerland) Michel Kratochvil (Croatia) Ivan Ljubičić (Argentina) Franco Squillari (France) Cédric Pioline
9 Jul	2001 Miller Lite Hall of Fame Championships; Newport, USA; ATP International Series $400,000 – grass Singles – Doubles	(South Africa) Neville Godwin; 6–1, 6–4	(United Kingdom) Martin Lee	(United States) James Blake (Denmark) Kenneth Carlsen	(United States) Kristian Capalik (Italy) Davide Sanguinetti (France) Michaël Llodra (Germany) Rainer Schüttler
9 Jul	2001 Miller Lite Hall of Fame Championships; Newport, USA; ATP International Series $400,000 – grass Singles – Doubles	(United States) Bob Bryan (United States) Mike Bryan; 6–3, 7–5	(Brazil) André Sá (United States) Glenn Weiner	(United States) James Blake (Denmark) Kenneth Carlsen	(United States) Kristian Capalik (Italy) Davide Sanguinetti (France) Michaël Llodra (Germany) Rainer Schüttler
16 Jul	2001 Mercedes Cup; Stuttgart, Germany; ATP International Series Gold $800,000 – clay Singles – Doubles	(Brazil) Gustavo Kuerten; 6–3, 6–2, 6–4	(Argentina) Guillermo Cañas	(Czech Republic) Jiří Novák (Spain) Marc López	(Ecuador) Nicolás Lapentti (Argentina) Gastón Gaudio (Spain) Alberto Martín (Russia) Yevgeny Kafelnikov
16 Jul	2001 Mercedes Cup; Stuttgart, Germany; ATP International Series Gold $800,000 – clay Singles – Doubles	(Argentina) Guillermo Cañas (Germany) Rainer Schüttler; 4–6, 7–6^{(7–1)}, 6–4	(Australia) Michael Hill (United States) Jeff Tarango	(Czech Republic) Jiří Novák (Spain) Marc López	(Ecuador) Nicolás Lapentti (Argentina) Gastón Gaudio (Spain) Alberto Martín (Russia) Yevgeny Kafelnikov
16 Jul	2001 Energis Open; Amsterdam, Netherlands; ATP International Series $400,000 – clay Singles – Doubles	(Spain) Àlex Corretja; 6–3, 5–7, 7–6^{(7–0)}, 3–6, 6–4	(Morocco) Younes El Aynaoui	(Sweden) Magnus Gustafsson (Netherlands) Sjeng Schalken	(Argentina) Juan Ignacio Chela (Spain) Álex Calatrava (Belgium) Olivier Rochus (Russia) Andrei Stoliarov
16 Jul	2001 Energis Open; Amsterdam, Netherlands; ATP International Series $400,000 – clay Singles – Doubles	(Netherlands) Paul Haarhuis (Netherlands) Sjeng Schalken; 6–4, 6–2	(Spain) Àlex Corretja (Argentina) Luis Lobo	(Sweden) Magnus Gustafsson (Netherlands) Sjeng Schalken	(Argentina) Juan Ignacio Chela (Spain) Álex Calatrava (Belgium) Olivier Rochus (Russia) Andrei Stoliarov
16 Jul	2001 Croatia Open; Umag, Croatia; ATP International Series $400,000 – clay Singles – Doubles	(Spain) Carlos Moyà; 6–4, 3–6, 7–6^{(7–2)}	(France) Jérôme Golmard	(Argentina) David Nalbandian (Romania) Adrian Voinea	(Hungary) Attila Sávolt (Spain) Félix Mantilla (Spain) Albert Montañés (Croatia) Ivan Ljubičić
16 Jul	2001 Croatia Open; Umag, Croatia; ATP International Series $400,000 – clay Singles – Doubles	(Argentina) Sergio Roitman (Argentina) Andrés Schneiter; 6–2, 7–5	(Croatia) Ivan Ljubičić (Croatia) Lovro Zovko	(Argentina) David Nalbandian (Romania) Adrian Voinea	(Hungary) Attila Sávolt (Spain) Félix Mantilla (Spain) Albert Montañés (Croatia) Ivan Ljubičić
23 Jul	2001 Generali Open; Kitzbühel, Austria; ATP International Series Gold $900,000 – clay Singles – Doubles	(Ecuador) Nicolás Lapentti; 1–6, 6–4, 7–5, 7–5	(Spain) Albert Costa	(Spain) Galo Blanco (Argentina) Guillermo Coria	(Spain) Juan Carlos Ferrero (Romania) Andrei Pavel (Austria) Stefan Koubek (United States) Hugo Armando
23 Jul	2001 Generali Open; Kitzbühel, Austria; ATP International Series Gold $900,000 – clay Singles – Doubles	(Spain) Àlex Corretja (Argentina) Luis Lobo; 6–1, 6–4	(Sweden) Simon Aspelin (Australia) Andrew Kratzmann	(Spain) Galo Blanco (Argentina) Guillermo Coria	(Spain) Juan Carlos Ferrero (Romania) Andrei Pavel (Austria) Stefan Koubek (United States) Hugo Armando
23 Jul	2001 Mercedes-Benz Cup; Los Angeles, USA; ATP International Series $400,000 – hard Singles – Doubles	(United States) Andre Agassi; 6–4, 6–2	(United States) Pete Sampras	(Brazil) Gustavo Kuerten (Belgium) Xavier Malisse	(Germany) Tommy Haas (United States) Jan-Michael Gambill (Sweden) Magnus Norman (United States) Taylor Dent
23 Jul	2001 Mercedes-Benz Cup; Los Angeles, USA; ATP International Series $400,000 – hard Singles – Doubles	(United States) Bob Bryan (United States) Mike Bryan; 7–5, 7–6^{(8–6)}	(United States) Jan-Michael Gambill (United States) Andy Roddick	(Brazil) Gustavo Kuerten (Belgium) Xavier Malisse	(Germany) Tommy Haas (United States) Jan-Michael Gambill (Sweden) Magnus Norman (United States) Taylor Dent
23 Jul	2001 Idea Prokom Open; Sopot, Poland; ATP International Series $400,000 – clay Singles – Doubles	(Spain) Tommy Robredo; 1–6, 7–5, 7–6^{(7–2)}	(Spain) Albert Portas	(Argentina) David Nalbandian (Armenia) Sargis Sargsian	(Spain) Óscar Serrano (Georgia (country)) Irakli Labadze (Spain) David Sánchez (Costa Rica) Juan Antonio Marín
23 Jul	2001 Idea Prokom Open; Sopot, Poland; ATP International Series $400,000 – clay Singles – Doubles	(Australia) Paul Hanley (Australia) Nathan Healey; 7–6^{(12–10)}, 6–2	(Georgia (country)) Irakli Labadze (Hungary) Attila Sávolt	(Argentina) David Nalbandian (Armenia) Sargis Sargsian	(Spain) Óscar Serrano (Georgia (country)) Irakli Labadze (Spain) David Sánchez (Costa Rica) Juan Antonio Marín
30 Jul	2001 Canada Masters; Montreal, Canada; Tennis Masters Series $2,450,000 – hard Singles – Doubles	(Romania) Andrei Pavel; 7–6^{(7–3)}, 2–6, 6–3	(Australia) Patrick Rafter	(Germany) Tommy Haas (France) Fabrice Santoro	(United States) Andy Roddick (France) Arnaud Clément (Spain) Juan Carlos Ferrero (Czech Republic) Bohdan Ulihrach
30 Jul	2001 Canada Masters; Montreal, Canada; Tennis Masters Series $2,450,000 – hard Singles – Doubles	(Czech Republic) Jiří Novák (Czech Republic) David Rikl; 6–4, 3–6, 6–3	(United States) Donald Johnson (United States) Jared Palmer	(Germany) Tommy Haas (France) Fabrice Santoro	(United States) Andy Roddick (France) Arnaud Clément (Spain) Juan Carlos Ferrero (Czech Republic) Bohdan Ulihrach

=== August ===
Week	Tournament	Champions	Runners-up	Semifinalists	Quarterfinalists
6 Aug	2001 Cincinnati Masters; Mason, USA; Tennis Masters Series $2,450,000 – hard Singles – Doubles	(Brazil) Gustavo Kuerten; 6–1, 6–3	(Australia) Patrick Rafter	(United Kingdom) Tim Henman (Australia) Lleyton Hewitt	(Russia) Yevgeny Kafelnikov (United States) Jan-Michael Gambill (Croatia) Ivan Ljubičić (United Kingdom) Greg Rusedski
6 Aug	2001 Cincinnati Masters; Mason, USA; Tennis Masters Series $2,450,000 – hard Singles – Doubles	(India) Mahesh Bhupathi (India) Leander Paes; 7–6^{(7–3)}, 6–3	(Czech Republic) Martin Damm (Germany) David Prinosil	(United Kingdom) Tim Henman (Australia) Lleyton Hewitt	(Russia) Yevgeny Kafelnikov (United States) Jan-Michael Gambill (Croatia) Ivan Ljubičić (United Kingdom) Greg Rusedski
13 Aug	2001 RCA Championships; Indianapolis, USA; ATP International Series Gold $800,000 – hard Singles – Doubles	(Australia) Patrick Rafter; 4–2 ret.	(Brazil) Gustavo Kuerten	(Croatia) Goran Ivanišević (Russia) Marat Safin	(United Kingdom) Tim Henman (Morocco) Younes El Aynaoui (Belarus) Max Mirnyi (Sweden) Thomas Enqvist
13 Aug	2001 RCA Championships; Indianapolis, USA; ATP International Series Gold $800,000 – hard Singles – Doubles	(The Bahamas) Mark Knowles (United States) Brian MacPhie; 7–6^{(7–5)}, 5–7, 6–4	(India) Mahesh Bhupathi (Canada) Sébastien Lareau	(Croatia) Goran Ivanišević (Russia) Marat Safin	(United Kingdom) Tim Henman (Morocco) Younes El Aynaoui (Belarus) Max Mirnyi (Sweden) Thomas Enqvist
13 Aug	2001 Legg Mason Tennis Classic; Washington, D.C., USA; ATP International Series Gold $800,000 – hard Singles – Doubles	(United States) Andy Roddick; 6–2, 6–3	(Netherlands) Sjeng Schalken	(United States) Andre Agassi (United States) Michael Chang	(United Kingdom) Greg Rusedski (France) Jérôme Golmard (France) Fabrice Santoro (Chile) Marcelo Ríos
13 Aug	2001 Legg Mason Tennis Classic; Washington, D.C., USA; ATP International Series Gold $800,000 – hard Singles – Doubles	(Czech Republic) Martin Damm (Germany) David Prinosil; 7–6^{(7–5)}, 6–3	(United States) Bob Bryan (United States) Mike Bryan	(United States) Andre Agassi (United States) Michael Chang	(United Kingdom) Greg Rusedski (France) Jérôme Golmard (France) Fabrice Santoro (Chile) Marcelo Ríos
20 Aug	2001 Hamlet Cup; Long Island, USA; ATP International Series $400,000 – hard Singles – Doubles	(Germany) Tommy Haas; 6–2, 3–6, 6–3	(United States) Pete Sampras	(Sweden) Thomas Johansson (France) Arnaud Clément	(Sweden) Thomas Enqvist (Spain) Félix Mantilla (Brazil) Fernando Meligeni (Sweden) Jonas Björkman
20 Aug	2001 Hamlet Cup; Long Island, USA; ATP International Series $400,000 – hard Singles – Doubles	(United States) Jonathan Stark (Zimbabwe) Kevin Ullyett; 6–1, 6–4	(Czech Republic) Leoš Friedl (Czech Republic) Radek Štěpánek	(Sweden) Thomas Johansson (France) Arnaud Clément	(Sweden) Thomas Enqvist (Spain) Félix Mantilla (Brazil) Fernando Meligeni (Sweden) Jonas Björkman
27 Aug; 3 Sep	2001 U.S. Open; Flushing, New York, United States; Grand Slam $6,382,000 – hard 128S/128Q/64D/32X; Singles – Doubles; Mixed doubles	(Australia) Lleyton Hewitt; 7–6^{(7–4)}, 6–1, 6–1	(United States) Pete Sampras	(Russia) Yevgeny Kafelnikov (Russia) Marat Safin	(Brazil) Gustavo Kuerten (United States) Andy Roddick (Argentina) Mariano Zabaleta (United States) Andre Agassi
27 Aug; 3 Sep	2001 U.S. Open; Flushing, New York, United States; Grand Slam $6,382,000 – hard 128S/128Q/64D/32X; Singles – Doubles; Mixed doubles	(Zimbabwe) Wayne Black (Zimbabwe) Kevin Ullyett; 7–6^{(11–9)}, 2–6, 6–3	(United States) Donald Johnson (United States) Jared Palmer	(Russia) Yevgeny Kafelnikov (Russia) Marat Safin	(Brazil) Gustavo Kuerten (United States) Andy Roddick (Argentina) Mariano Zabaleta (United States) Andre Agassi
27 Aug; 3 Sep	2001 U.S. Open; Flushing, New York, United States; Grand Slam $6,382,000 – hard 128S/128Q/64D/32X; Singles – Doubles; Mixed doubles	(Australia) Todd Woodbridge (Australia) Rennae Stubbs; 6–4, 5–7, 11–9	(India) Leander Paes (United States) Lisa Raymond	(Russia) Yevgeny Kafelnikov (Russia) Marat Safin	(Brazil) Gustavo Kuerten (United States) Andy Roddick (Argentina) Mariano Zabaleta (United States) Andre Agassi

=== September ===
Week	Tournament	Champions	Runners-up	Semifinalists	Quarterfinalists
10 Sep	2001 Gelsor Open Romania; Bucharest, Romania; ATP International Series $400,000 – clay Singles – Doubles	(Morocco) Younes El Aynaoui; 7–6^{(7–5)}, 7–6^{(7–2)}	(Spain) Albert Montañés	(Spain) Fernando Vicente (France) Jérôme Golmard	(Germany) Tomas Behrend (Romania) Adrian Voinea (Belgium) Christophe Rochus (Spain) Juan Balcells
10 Sep	2001 Gelsor Open Romania; Bucharest, Romania; ATP International Series $400,000 – clay Singles – Doubles	(North Macedonia) Aleksandar Kitinov (Sweden) Johan Landsberg; 6–4, 6–7^{(5–7)}, 10–6	(Argentina) Pablo Albano (Germany) Marc-Kevin Goellner	(Spain) Fernando Vicente (France) Jérôme Golmard	(Germany) Tomas Behrend (Romania) Adrian Voinea (Belgium) Christophe Rochus (Spain) Juan Balcells
10 Sep	2001 Brasil Open; Salvador, Brazil; ATP International Series $400,000 – hard Singles – Doubles	(Czech Republic) Jan Vacek; 2–6, 7–6^{(7–2)}, 6–3	(Brazil) Fernando Meligeni	(Brazil) Alexandre Simoni (Argentina) Agustín Calleri	(Brazil) Flávio Saretta (Brazil) Ricardo Mello (Paraguay) Ramón Delgado (Argentina) Guillermo Cañas
10 Sep	2001 Brasil Open; Salvador, Brazil; ATP International Series $400,000 – hard Singles – Doubles	(Argentina) Enzo Artoni (Brazil) Daniel Melo; 6–3, 1–6, 7–6^{(7–5)}	(Argentina) Gastón Etlis (South Africa) Brent Haygarth	(Brazil) Alexandre Simoni (Argentina) Agustín Calleri	(Brazil) Flávio Saretta (Brazil) Ricardo Mello (Paraguay) Ramón Delgado (Argentina) Guillermo Cañas
10 Sep	2001 President's Cup; Tashkent, Uzbekistan; ATP International Series $550,000 – hard Singles – Doubles	(Russia) Marat Safin; 6–2, 6–2	(Russia) Yevgeny Kafelnikov	(Armenia) Sargis Sargsian (Slovakia) Dominik Hrbatý	(Denmark) Kristian Pless (Netherlands) Sjeng Schalken (Thailand) Paradorn Srichaphan (Germany) Rainer Schüttler
10 Sep	2001 President's Cup; Tashkent, Uzbekistan; ATP International Series $550,000 – hard Singles – Doubles	(France) Julien Boutter (Slovakia) Dominik Hrbatý; 6–4, 3–6, 13–11	(South Africa) Marius Barnard (United States) Jim Thomas	(Armenia) Sargis Sargsian (Slovakia) Dominik Hrbatý	(Denmark) Kristian Pless (Netherlands) Sjeng Schalken (Thailand) Paradorn Srichaphan (Germany) Rainer Schüttler
17 Sep	Davis Cup by BNP Paribas Semifinals; Sydney, Australia – hard Rotterdam, Netherlands – carpet (i)	Semifinal winners Australia 4–1; France 3–2	Semifinal losers Sweden; Netherlands		
17 Sep	2001 Heineken Open Shanghai; Shanghai, China; ATP International Series $400,000 – hard Singles – Doubles	(Germany) Rainer Schüttler; 6–3, 6–4	(Switzerland) Michel Kratochvil	(Denmark) Kenneth Carlsen (Spain) Francisco Clavet	(Georgia (country)) Irakli Labadze (Netherlands) Edwin Kempes (Japan) Takahiro Terachi (Israel) Noam Behr
17 Sep	2001 Heineken Open Shanghai; Shanghai, China; ATP International Series $400,000 – hard Singles – Doubles	(Zimbabwe) Byron Black (Japan) Thomas Shimada; 6–2, 3–6, 7–5	(South Africa) John-Laffnie de Jager (South Africa) Robbie Koenig	(Denmark) Kenneth Carlsen (Spain) Francisco Clavet	(Georgia (country)) Irakli Labadze (Netherlands) Edwin Kempes (Japan) Takahiro Terachi (Israel) Noam Behr
24 Sep	2001 Salem Open; Hong Kong SAR; ATP International Series $400,000 – hard Singles – Doubles	(Chile) Marcelo Ríos; 7–6^{(7–3)}, 6–2	(Germany) Rainer Schüttler	(Brazil) André Sá (Australia) Andrew Ilie	(Spain) Juan Carlos Ferrero (Sweden) Jonas Björkman (France) Sébastien Grosjean (Sweden) Magnus Larsson
24 Sep	2001 Salem Open; Hong Kong SAR; ATP International Series $400,000 – hard Singles – Doubles	(Germany) Karsten Braasch (Brazil) André Sá; 6–0, 7–5	(Czech Republic) Petr Luxa (Czech Republic) Radek Štěpánek	(Brazil) André Sá (Australia) Andrew Ilie	(Spain) Juan Carlos Ferrero (Sweden) Jonas Björkman (France) Sébastien Grosjean (Sweden) Magnus Larsson
24 Sep	2001 Campionati Internazionali di Sicilia; Palermo, Italy; ATP International Series $400,000 – clay Singles – Doubles	(Spain) Félix Mantilla; 7–6^{(7–2)}, 6–4	(Argentina) David Nalbandian	(Spain) Albert Portas (Spain) Tommy Robredo	(Argentina) Mariano Zabaleta (Spain) David Sánchez (Czech Republic) Jiří Vaněk (Spain) Albert Costa
24 Sep	2001 Campionati Internazionali di Sicilia; Palermo, Italy; ATP International Series $400,000 – clay Singles – Doubles	(Spain) Tomás Carbonell (Argentina) Daniel Orsanic; 6–2, 2–6, 6–2	(Argentina) Enzo Artoni (Spain) Emilio Benfele Álvarez	(Spain) Albert Portas (Spain) Tommy Robredo	(Argentina) Mariano Zabaleta (Spain) David Sánchez (Czech Republic) Jiří Vaněk (Spain) Albert Costa

=== October ===
Week	Tournament	Champions	Runners-up	Semifinalists	Quarterfinalists
1 Oct	2001 AIG Japan Open Tennis Championships; Tokyo, Japan; ATP International Series Gold $800,000 – hard Singles – Doubles	(Australia) Lleyton Hewitt; 6–4, 6–2	(Switzerland) Michel Kratochvil	(United States) James Blake (Slovakia) Karol Kučera	(Spain) Francisco Clavet (Chile) Marcelo Ríos (Japan) Takao Suzuki (Netherlands) Sjeng Schalken
1 Oct	2001 AIG Japan Open Tennis Championships; Tokyo, Japan; ATP International Series Gold $800,000 – hard Singles – Doubles	(United States) Rick Leach (Australia) David MacPherson; 1–6, 7–6^{(8–6)}, 7–6^{(7–4)}	(Australia) Paul Hanley (Australia) Nathan Healey	(United States) James Blake (Slovakia) Karol Kučera	(Spain) Francisco Clavet (Chile) Marcelo Ríos (Japan) Takao Suzuki (Netherlands) Sjeng Schalken
1 Oct	2001 Kremlin Cup; Moscow, Russia; ATP International Series $1,000,000 – carpet (i); Singles – Doubles	(Russia) Yevgeny Kafelnikov; 6–4, 7–5	(Germany) Nicolas Kiefer	(Germany) Tommy Haas (Slovakia) Dominik Hrbatý	(Sweden) Thomas Johansson (Sweden) Magnus Gustafsson (Switzerland) Marc Rosset (Czech Republic) Jiří Novák
1 Oct	2001 Kremlin Cup; Moscow, Russia; ATP International Series $1,000,000 – carpet (i); Singles – Doubles	(Belarus) Max Mirnyi (Australia) Sandon Stolle; 6–3, 6–0	(India) Mahesh Bhupathi (United States) Jeff Tarango	(Germany) Tommy Haas (Slovakia) Dominik Hrbatý	(Sweden) Thomas Johansson (Sweden) Magnus Gustafsson (Switzerland) Marc Rosset (Czech Republic) Jiří Novák
8 Oct	2001 CA-TennisTrophy; Vienna, Austria; ATP International Series Gold $800,000 – hard (i); Singles – Doubles	(Germany) Tommy Haas; 6–2, 7–6^{(8–6)}, 6–4	(Argentina) Guillermo Cañas	(Sweden) Thomas Enqvist (Austria) Stefan Koubek	(Czech Republic) Bohdan Ulihrach (Sweden) Andreas Vinciguerra (Switzerland) Roger Federer (Switzerland) Michel Kratochvil
8 Oct	2001 CA-TennisTrophy; Vienna, Austria; ATP International Series Gold $800,000 – hard (i); Singles – Doubles	(Czech Republic) Martin Damm (Czech Republic) Radek Štěpánek; 6–3, 6–2	(Czech Republic) Jiří Novák (Czech Republic) David Rikl	(Sweden) Thomas Enqvist (Austria) Stefan Koubek	(Czech Republic) Bohdan Ulihrach (Sweden) Andreas Vinciguerra (Switzerland) Roger Federer (Switzerland) Michel Kratochvil
8 Oct	2001 Grand Prix de Tennis de Lyon; Lyon, France; ATP International Series $800,000 – carpet (i); Singles – Doubles	(Croatia) Ivan Ljubičić; 6–3, 6–2	(Morocco) Younes El Aynaoui	(Russia) Marat Safin (Belgium) Xavier Malisse	(Argentina) Gastón Gaudio (Belarus) Max Mirnyi (Sweden) Jonas Björkman (Spain) Juan Carlos Ferrero
8 Oct	2001 Grand Prix de Tennis de Lyon; Lyon, France; ATP International Series $800,000 – carpet (i); Singles – Doubles	(Canada) Daniel Nestor (Federal Republic of Yugoslavia) Nenad Zimonjić; 6–1, 6–2	(France) Arnaud Clément (France) Sébastien Grosjean	(Russia) Marat Safin (Belgium) Xavier Malisse	(Argentina) Gastón Gaudio (Belarus) Max Mirnyi (Sweden) Jonas Björkman (Spain) Juan Carlos Ferrero
15 Oct	2001 Stuttgart Masters; Stuttgart, Germany; Tennis Masters Series $2,450,000 – hard (i); Singles – Doubles	(Germany) Tommy Haas; 6–2, 6–2, 6–2	(Belarus) Max Mirnyi	(Russia) Yevgeny Kafelnikov (Australia) Lleyton Hewitt	(United States) Pete Sampras (Sweden) Thomas Enqvist (South Africa) Wayne Ferreira (United Kingdom) Tim Henman
15 Oct	2001 Stuttgart Masters; Stuttgart, Germany; Tennis Masters Series $2,450,000 – hard (i); Singles – Doubles	(Belarus) Max Mirnyi (Australia) Sandon Stolle; 7–6(0), 7–6^{(7–4)}	(South Africa) Ellis Ferreira (United States) Jeff Tarango	(Russia) Yevgeny Kafelnikov (Australia) Lleyton Hewitt	(United States) Pete Sampras (Sweden) Thomas Enqvist (South Africa) Wayne Ferreira (United Kingdom) Tim Henman
22 Oct	2001 Davidoff Swiss Indoors; Basel, Switzerland; ATP International Series $1,000,000 – carpet (i); Singles – Doubles	(United Kingdom) Tim Henman; 6–3, 6–4, 6–2	(Switzerland) Roger Federer	(France) Julien Boutter (Spain) Carlos Moyà	(Switzerland) George Bastl (United States) Andy Roddick (Russia) Nikolay Davydenko (Switzerland) Michel Kratochvil
22 Oct	2001 Davidoff Swiss Indoors; Basel, Switzerland; ATP International Series $1,000,000 – carpet (i); Singles – Doubles	(South Africa) Ellis Ferreira (United States) Rick Leach; 7–6^{(7–3)}, 6–4	(India) Mahesh Bhupathi (India) Leander Paes	(France) Julien Boutter (Spain) Carlos Moyà	(Switzerland) George Bastl (United States) Andy Roddick (Russia) Nikolay Davydenko (Switzerland) Michel Kratochvil
22 Oct	2001 St. Petersburg Open; St. Petersburg, Russia; ATP International Series $800,000 – hard (i); Singles – Doubles	(Russia) Marat Safin; 3–6, 6–3, 6–3	(Germany) Rainer Schüttler	(France) Michaël Llodra (Russia) Yevgeny Kafelnikov	(Belarus) Max Mirnyi (Austria) Stefan Koubek (Croatia) Goran Ivanišević (France) Fabrice Santoro
22 Oct	2001 St. Petersburg Open; St. Petersburg, Russia; ATP International Series $800,000 – hard (i); Singles – Doubles	(Russia) Denis Golovanov (Russia) Yevgeny Kafelnikov; 7–5, 6–4	(Georgia (country)) Irakli Labadze (Russia) Marat Safin	(France) Michaël Llodra (Russia) Yevgeny Kafelnikov	(Belarus) Max Mirnyi (Austria) Stefan Koubek (Croatia) Goran Ivanišević (France) Fabrice Santoro
22 Oct	2001 If Stockholm Open; Stockholm, Sweden; ATP International Series $800,000 – hard (i); Singles – Doubles	(Netherlands) Sjeng Schalken; 3–6, 6–3, 6–3, 4–6, 6–3	(Finland) Jarkko Nieminen	(Argentina) Guillermo Cañas (Sweden) Thomas Enqvist	(Czech Republic) Jan Vacek (South Africa) Wayne Ferreira (Sweden) Thomas Johansson (Chile) Marcelo Ríos
22 Oct	2001 If Stockholm Open; Stockholm, Sweden; ATP International Series $800,000 – hard (i); Singles – Doubles	(United States) Donald Johnson (United States) Jared Palmer; 6–3, 4–6, 6–3	(Sweden) Jonas Björkman (Australia) Todd Woodbridge	(Argentina) Guillermo Cañas (Sweden) Thomas Enqvist	(Czech Republic) Jan Vacek (South Africa) Wayne Ferreira (Sweden) Thomas Johansson (Chile) Marcelo Ríos
29 Oct	2001 Paris Masters; Paris, France; Tennis Masters Series $2,450,000 – carpet (i); Singles – Doubles	(France) Sébastien Grosjean; 7–6^{(7–3)}, 6–1, 6–7^{(5–7)}, 6–4	(Russia) Yevgeny Kafelnikov	(Sweden) Andreas Vinciguerra (Germany) Tommy Haas	(Netherlands) Sjeng Schalken (Czech Republic) Jiří Novák (Morocco) Hicham Arazi (Sweden) Thomas Johansson
29 Oct	2001 Paris Masters; Paris, France; Tennis Masters Series $2,450,000 – carpet (i); Singles – Doubles	(South Africa) Ellis Ferreira (United States) Rick Leach; 3–6, 6–4, 6–3	(India) Mahesh Bhupathi (India) Leander Paes	(Sweden) Andreas Vinciguerra (Germany) Tommy Haas	(Netherlands) Sjeng Schalken (Czech Republic) Jiří Novák (Morocco) Hicham Arazi (Sweden) Thomas Johansson

=== November ===
Week	Tournament	Champions	Runners-up	Semifinalists	Quarterfinalists
5 Nov	No tournaments scheduled.				
12 Nov	2001 Tennis Masters Cup; Sydney, Australia; Tennis Masters Cup $3,700,000 – hard (i); Singles	(Australia) Lleyton Hewitt; 6–3, 6–3, 6–4	(France) Sébastien Grosjean	(Russia) Yevgeny Kafelnikov (Spain) Juan Carlos Ferrero	(Croatia) Goran Ivanišević (Brazil) Gustavo Kuerten (United States) Andre Agassi (Australia) Patrick Rafter
26 Nov	Davis Cup by BNP Paribas Final; Melbourne, Australia – grass	France; 3–2	Australia		

== Statistical information ==
List of players and titles won (Grand Slam and Masters Cup titles in bold), listed in order of most titles won:

- (Australia) Lleyton Hewitt – Sydney, London Queen's Club, 's-Hertogenbosch, **US Open**, Tokyo and **Masters Cup** (6)
- (Brazil) Gustavo Kuerten – Buenos Aires, Acapulco, Monte Carlo Masters, **French Open**, Stuttgart Outdoor and Cincinnati Masters (6)
- (United States) Andre Agassi – **Australian Open**, Indian Wells Masters, Miami Masters and Los Angeles (4)
- (Spain) Juan Carlos Ferrero – Dubai, Estoril, Barcelona and Rome Masters (4)
- (Germany) Tommy Haas – Adelaide, Long Island, Vienna and Stuttgart Masters (4)
- (United States) Andy Roddick – Atlanta, Houston and Washington, D.C. (3)
- (Italy) Andrea Gaudenzi – St. Poelten and Båstad (2)
- (United Kingdom) Tim Henman – Copenhagen and Basel (2)
- (Sweden) Thomas Johansson – Halle and Nottingham (2)
- (Russia) Yevgeny Kafelnikov – Marseille and Moscow (2)
- (Czech Republic) Jiří Novák – Munich and Gstaad (2)
- (Chile) Marcelo Ríos – Doha and Hong Kong (2)
- (Russia) Marat Safin – Tashkent and St. Petersburg (2)
- (Argentina) Guillermo Cañas – Casablanca (1)
- (Spain) Francisco Clavet – Scottsdale (1)
- (Argentina) Guillermo Coria – Viña del Mar (1)
- (Spain) Àlex Corretja – Amsterdam (1)
- (Morocco) Younes El Aynaoui – Bucharest (1)
- (France) Nicolas Escudé – Rotterdam (1)
- (Switzerland) Roger Federer – Milan (1)
- (United States) Jan-Michael Gambill – Delray Beach (1)
- (South Africa) Neville Godwin – Newport (1)
- (France) Sébastien Grosjean – Paris Masters (1)
- (Slovakia) Dominik Hrbatý – Auckland (1)
- (Croatia) Goran Ivanišević – **Wimbledon** (1)
- (Ecuador) Nicolás Lapentti – Kitzbühel (1)
- (Croatia) Ivan Ljubičić – Lyon (1)
- (Spain) Félix Mantilla – Palermo (1)
- (Spain) Alberto Martín – Mallorca (1)
- (Spain) Carlos Moyà – Umag (1)
- (Romania) Andrei Pavel – Canada Masters (1)
- (Australia) Mark Philippoussis – Memphis (1)
- (Spain) Albert Portas – Hamburg Masters (1)
- (Australia) Patrick Rafter – Indianapolis (1)
- (Spain) Tommy Robredo – Sopot (1)
- (United Kingdom) Greg Rusedski – San Jose (1)
- (Netherlands) Sjeng Schalken – Stockholm (1)
- (Germany) Rainer Schüttler – Shanghai (1)
- (Czech Republic) Michal Tabara – Chennai (1)
- (Czech Republic) Jan Vacek – Salvador (1)
- (Spain) Fernando Vicente – Bogotá (1)

The following players won their first title:

- (Argentina) Guillermo Cañas – Casablanca
- (Argentina) Guillermo Coria – Viña del Mar
- (Switzerland) Roger Federer – Milan
- (South Africa) Neville Godwin – Newport
- (Croatia) Ivan Ljubičić – Lyon
- (Spain) Albert Portas – Hamburg Masters
- (Spain) Tommy Robredo – Sopot
- (United States) Andy Roddick – Atlanta
- (Czech Republic) Michal Tabara – Chennai
- (Czech Republic) Jan Vacek – Salvador

Titles won by nation:

- Spain 12 (Bogotá, Dubai, Scottsdale, Estoril, Barcelona, Mallorca, Rome Masters, Hamburg Masters, Amsterdam, Umag, Sopot and Palermo)
- Australia 8 (Sydney, Memphis, London Queen's Club, 's-Hertogenbosch, Indianapolis, **US Open**, Tokyo and **Masters Cup**)
- United States 8 (**Australian Open**, Delray Beach, Indian Wells Masters, Miami Masters, Atlanta, Houston, Los Angeles and Washington, D.C.)
- Brazil 6 (Buenos Aires, Acapulco, Monte Carlo Masters, **French Open**, Stuttgart Outdoor and Cincinnati Masters)
- Germany 5 (Adelaide, Long Island, Shanghai, Vienna and Stuttgart Masters)
- Czech Republic 4 (Chennai, Munich, Gstaad and Salvador)
- Russia 4 (Marseille, Tashkent, Moscow and St. Petersburg)
- United Kingdom 3 (Copenhagen, San Jose and Basel)
- Argentina 2 (Viña del Mar and Casablanca)
- Chile 2 (Doha and Hong Kong)
- Croatia 2 (**Wimbledon** and Lyon)
- France 2 (Rotterdam and Paris Masters)
- Italy 2 (St. Poelten and Båstad)
- Sweden 2 (Halle and Nottingham)
- Ecuador 1 (Kitzbühel)
- Morocco 1 (Bucharest)
- Netherlands 1 (Stockholm)
- Romania 1 (Canada Masters)
- Slovakia 1 (Auckland)
- South Africa 1 (Newport)
- Switzerland 1 (Milan)

== ATP entry rankings ==
=== Singles ===
ATP rankings

As of 25 December 2000
Rk	Name	Nation	Points
1	Gustavo Kuerten	BRA	4,195
2	Marat Safin	RUS	4,120
3	Pete Sampras	USA	3,385
4	Magnus Norman	SWE	3,110
5	Yevgeny Kafelnikov	RUS	2,935
6	Andre Agassi	USA	2,765
7	Lleyton Hewitt	AUS	2,625
8	Àlex Corretja	ESP	2,475
9	Thomas Enqvist	SWE	2,210
10	Tim Henman	GBR	2,020
11	Mark Philippoussis	AUS	1,865
12	Juan Carlos Ferrero	ESP	1,840
13	Wayne Ferreira	RSA	1,770
14	Franco Squillari	ARG	1,598
15	Patrick Rafter	AUS	1,535
16	Cédric Pioline	FRA	1,520
17	Dominik Hrbatý	SVK	1,395
18	Arnaud Clément	FRA	1,360
19	Sébastien Grosjean	FRA	1,325
20	Nicolas Kiefer	GER	1,265

Year-end rankings 2001 (31 December 2001)
Rk	Name	Nation	Points	High	Low	Change
1	Lleyton Hewitt	AUS	4,365	1	8	▲6
2	Gustavo Kuerten	BRA	3,855	1	2	▼1
3	Andre Agassi	USA	3,520	2	6	▲3
4	Yevgeny Kafelnikov	RUS	3,090	4	7	▲1
5	Juan Carlos Ferrero	ESP	3,040	4	16	▲7
6	Sébastien Grosjean	FRA	2,790	6	19	▲13
7	Patrick Rafter	AUS	2,785	4	15	▲8
8	Tommy Haas	GER	2,285	8	24	▲15
9	Tim Henman	GBR	2,100	8	12	▲1
10	Pete Sampras	USA	1,940	3	12	▼7
11	Marat Safin	RUS	1,920	1	11	▼9
12	Goran Ivanišević	CRO	1,761	12	132	▲117
13	Roger Federer	SUI	1,745	12	30	▲16
14	Andy Roddick	USA	1,573	14	156	▲142
15	Guillermo Cañas	ARG	1,572	15	231	▲216
16	Àlex Corretja	ESP	1,525	7	17	▼8
17	Arnaud Clément	FRA	1,475	10	18	▲1
18	Thomas Johansson	SWE	1,375	14	39	▲21
19	Carlos Moyà	ESP	1,310	16	42	▲22
20	Albert Portas	ESP	1,220	19	57	▲31

== Retirements ==
Following is a list of notable players (winners of a main tour title, and/or part of the ATP rankings top 100 (singles) or top 50 (doubles) for at least one week) who announced their retirement from professional tennis, became inactive (after not playing for more than 52 weeks), or were permanently banned from playing, during the 2001 season:

- ESP Julián Alonso (born August 2, 1977, in Canet de Mar, Spain) He turned professional in 1996 and reached his career-high ranking of no. 30 in 1998. He earned two career titles.
- ESP Alberto Berasategui (born 28 June 1973 in Bilbao, Spain) He turned professional in 1991 and reached a career-high ranking of world no. 7. He reached the final of the French Open in 1994 and the quarterfinals of the Australian Open. He earned 14 ATP titles. He played his last career match in Barcelona in March against Álex Calatrava
- ESP Tomás Carbonell (born 7 August 1968 in Barcelona, Spain) His highest singles ranking was world no. 40. He earned two singles titles and 22 doubles titles. His career-high doubles ranking was no. 22, and he twice reached the semifinals of the French Open (1999 and 2000). He played his last career match in Lyon in October partnering Lucas Arnold Ker.
- BEL Filip Dewulf (born 15 March 1972 in Mol, Belgium) He turned professional in 1990 and reached his career-high ranking of world no. 39 in 1997. He earned two career ATP titles and played his last match in Magdeburg, Germany in March against Michaël Llodra.
- CZE Ctislav Doseděl (born 10 August 1970 in Přerov, Czechoslovakia) He turned professional in 1989 and reached his career-high ranking of no. 26 in 1994. He reached the quarterfinals of the US Open in 1999 and earned three career singles titles and one doubles title.
- ARG Hernán Gumy (born 5 March 1972 in Buenos Aires, Argentina) He turned professional in 1991 and reached his career-high ranking of no. 39 in 1996. He earned one career title and played his last match in Biella, Italy in June against Solon Peppas.
- CAN Sébastien Lareau (born 27 April 1973 in Montreal, Canada) He turned professional in 1991 and reached his highest doubles ranking of world no. 4 in 1999. He earned 17 doubles titles and an Olympic gold medal in 2000. His last career match was at the US Open partnering Ben Ellwood.
- UKR Andriy Medvedev (born 31 August 1974 in Kyiv) He turned professional in 1991 and reached a career-high ranking of world no. 4. He won 11 career ATP titles and was a finalist at the French Open in 1999, a semifinalist at the year-end finals in 1993, and a quarterfinalist at the Australian and US Opens. In all, he won 19 career doubles titles. He played his last career match in St. Petersburg in October against Stefan Koubek.
- RSA Piet Norval (born 7 April 1970 in Bellville, Cape Town, South Africa) He turned professional in 1988 and reached a career-high doubles ranking of world no. 16 in 1995. He was a semifinalist at Wimbledon and a quarterfinalist at the three other Grand Slam tournaments. He also won the year-end doubles finals in 2000 and a silver medal at the 1992 Olympics. He earned a total of 14 doubles ATP titles. His last match was at the Australian Open partnering Donald Johnson.
- BRA Jaime Oncins (born 16 June 1970 in São Paulo, Brazil) He turned professional in 1988 and reached his career-high ranking of world no. 34 in 1993. He earned two career singles ATP titles and five doubles titles. His highest doubles ranking was no. 22. His final singles and doubles matches were both in Brazil in September.
- ESP Francisco Roig, who had retired from singles two years prior, officially retired from doubles at the close of the 2001 season. Nevertheless, his final professional match would take place in 2014.
- USA Jonathan Stark (born 3 April 1971 in Medford, Oregon) He turned professional in 1991 and reached a career-high ranking of world no. 36, earning two singles titles. In doubles, he was ranked world no. 1. He won the French Open in 1994, was a semifinalist at the Australian Open, and a quarterfinalist at Wimbledon and the US Open. He played his last career singles match in June in Nottingham and his last career doubles match in October in St. Petersburg partnering Justin Gimelstob.
- AUS Jason Stoltenberg (born 4 April 1970 in Narrabri, Australia) He turned professional in 1987 and reached a career-high ranking of world no. 19 in 1994. He reached the semifinals at Wimbledon in 1996 and earned four career singles titles. In doubles, he reached a career-high ranking of no. 23 in 1991 and earned five career titles. He played his last career match at Wimbledon against Juan Carlos Ferrero. He had a brilliant Juniors career, winning the Australian Open, being a finalist at the French Open and Wimbledon, and a semifinalist at the US Open, all in 1987. He is perhaps the only player on tour to have gotten started in tennis playing on a crushed termite mound court.
- USA David Wheaton (born 2 June 1969 in Minneapolis, Minnesota) He turned professional in 1988 and reached his career-high singles ranking of world no. 12 in 1991. He reached the semifinals at Wimbledon in 1991 and the quarterfinals of the Australian Open and the US Open in 1990. He earned three career singles titles. In doubles, he was ranked no. 24 in 1991 and earned three titles. He played his last career match in Knoxville, Tennessee, in November partnering Eric Taino.
- USA Chris Woodruff (born 3 January 1973 in Knoxville, Tennessee) He turned professional in 1993 and reached his highest career ranking of world no. 29 in 1997. He reached the quarterfinals of the Australian Open in 2000 and earned two career titles. He played his last career match in Tyler, Texas, in November against Gabriel Trifu.

== See also ==
- 2001 WTA Tour
