= 2001 Gold Flake Open =

- Date: 1–7 January
- Edition: 6th
- Category: International Series
- Draw: 32S / 16D
- Prize money: $375,000
- Surface: Hard / outdoor
- Location: Chennai, India
- Venue: SDAT Tennis Stadium

Champions

Singles
- (Czech Republic) Michal Tabara

Doubles
- (Zimbabwe) Byron Black / (Zimbabwe) Wayne Black
← 2000 ·	Maharashtra Open	· 2002 →

The 2001 Gold Flake Open was a men's tennis tournament played on outdoor hard courts at the SDAT Tennis Stadium in Chennai in India and was part of the International Series of the 2001 ATP Tour. The tournament was held from 1 January through 7 January 2001. Unseeded Michal Tabara won the singles title.

== Finals ==
=== Singles ===
(Czech Republic) Michal Tabara defeated (Russia) Andrei Stoliarov 6–2, 7–6^{(7–4)}

- It was Tabara's only title of the year and the 1st of his career.

=== Doubles ===
(Zimbabwe) Byron Black / (Zimbabwe) Wayne Black defeated (United Kingdom) Barry Cowan / (Italy) Mosé Navarra 6–3, 6–4

- It was Byron Black's 1st title of the year and the 23rd of his career. It was Wayne Black's 1st title of the year and the 5th of his career.
