= 2001 Gold Flake Open – Singles =

Singles
- 2001 Gold Flake Open

Final
- Champion: (Czech Republic) Michal Tabara
- Runner-up: (Russia) Andrei Stoliarov
- Score: 6–2, 7–6^{(7–4)}

Details
- Draw: 32
- Seeds: 8

Events
| Singles | Doubles |
| ← 2000 · | Gold Flake Open | · 2002 → |

Jérôme Golmard was the defending champion but lost in the second round to Adrian Voinea.

Michal Tabara won in the final 6–2, 7–6^{(7–4)} against Andrei Stoliarov.

== Seeds ==
1. (Sweden) Magnus Norman (first round)
2. (Argentina) Franco Squillari (first round)
3. (France) Cédric Pioline (quarterfinals)
4. (Zimbabwe) Byron Black (second round)
5. (France) Jérôme Golmard (second round)
6. (Sweden) Andreas Vinciguerra (second round)
7. (Germany) Markus Hantschk (first round)
8. (Czech Republic) Jiří Vaněk (first round)

== Draw ==
=== Key ===
- Q = Qualifier
- WC = Wild card
- LL = Lucky loser
- Alt = Alternate
- SE = Special exempt
- PR = Protected ranking
- ITF = ITF entry
- JE = Junior exempt
- w/o = Walkover
- r = Retired
- d = Defaulted
- SR = Special ranking

=== Finals ===
Semifinals
Q | (Denmark) Kristian Pless | 0^{r}
(Czech Republic) Michal Tabara | 4
(Spain) Tommy Robredo | 6 | 3 | 4
(Russia) Andrei Stoliarov | 4 | 6 | 6

Final
(Czech Republic) Michal Tabara | 6 | 7^{7}
(Russia) Andrei Stoliarov | 2 | 6^{4}

=== Top half ===
First round
1 | (Sweden) M Norman | 3 | 6^{3}
WC | (United States) T Dent | 6 | 7^{7}
(Zimbabwe) W Black | 2 | 5
Q | (Denmark) K Pless | 6 | 7
WC | (India) F Syed | 4 | 2
(Romania) A Voinea | 6 | 6
(Switzerland) G Bastl | 5 | 7^{7} | 1
7 | (France) J Golmard | 7 | 6^{3} | 6
3 | (France) C Pioline | 3 | 6 | 7^{7}
(Spain) G Blanco | 6 | 3 | 6^{4}
(Czech Republic) T Zíb | 3 | 2
(Haiti) R Agénor | 6 | 6
(Chile) F González | 3 | 3
(Czech Republic) M Tabara | 6 | 6
(Netherlands) E Kempes | 7^{7} | 4 | 6
8 | (Czech Republic) J Vaněk | 6^{5} | 6 | 3

Second round
WC | (United States) T Dent | 6^{9} | 4
Q | (Denmark) K Pless | 7^{11} | 6
(Romania) A Voinea | 1
5 | (France) J Golmard | 2^{r}
3 | (France) C Pioline | 4 | 6 | 6
(Haiti) R Agénor | 6 | 3 | 2
(Czech Republic) M Tabara | 6 | 6
(Netherlands) E Kempes | 4 | 0

Quarterfinals
Q | (Denmark) K Pless | 6 | 7
(Romania) A Voinea | 1 | 5
3 | (France) C Pioline | 4 | 1
(Czech Republic) M Tabara | 6 | 6

Semifinals
Q | (Denmark) K Pless | 0^{r}
(Czech Republic) M Tabara | 4

=== Bottom half ===
First round
7 | (Germany) M Hantschk | 3 | 0
(Spain) D Sánchez | 6 | 6
(India) L Paes | 6^{4} | 0
(Spain) T Robredo | 7^{7} | 6
(Spain) E Benfele Álvarez | 4 | 2
Q | (France) C Saulnier | 6 | 6
Q | (Russia) N Davydenko | 4 | 6 | 3
4 | (Zimbabwe) B Black | 6 | 4 | 6
6 | (Sweden) A Vinciguerra | 7^{7} | 6
(Switzerland) M Kratochvil | 6^{4} | 3
WC | (India) M Bhupathi | 6 | 2 | 6^{2}
(Russia) A Stoliarov | 3 | 6 | 7^{7}
(Netherlands) P Wessels | 7 | 6
Q | (France) L Roux | 5 | 1
(Russia) M Youzhny | 6^{4} | 6 | 6
2 | (Argentina) F Squillari | 7^{7} | 1 | 2

Second round
(Spain) D Sánchez | 6 | 1 | 2
(Spain) T Robredo | 4 | 6 | 6
Q | (France) C Saulnier | 6 | 6
4 | (Zimbabwe) B Black | 3 | 4
6 | (Sweden) A Vinciguerra | 1 | 3
(Russia) A Stoliarov | 6 | 6
(Netherlands) P Wessels | 6 | 6
(Russia) M Youzhny | 0 | 4

Quarterfinals
(Spain) T Robredo | 6 | 6
Q | (France) C Saulnier | 2 | 1
(Russia) A Stoliarov | 1 | 6 | 6
(Netherlands) P Wessels | 6 | 3 | 2

Semifinals
(Spain) T Robredo | 6 | 3 | 4
(Russia) A Stoliarov | 4 | 6 | 6

== Qualifying ==
=== Seeds ===
1. (France) Cyril Saulnier (Qualifier)
2. (Russia) Nikolay Davydenko (Qualifier)
3. (Italy) Laurence Tieleman (final round)
4. (Germany) Tomas Behrend (second round)
5. (Germany) Oliver Gross (first round)
6. (United Kingdom) Arvind Parmar (second round)
7. (United States) Michael Russell (first round)
8. (United Kingdom) Martin Lee (second round)

=== Qualifiers ===
1. (France) Cyril Saulnier
2. (Russia) Nikolay Davydenko
3. (France) Lionel Roux
4. (Denmark) Kristian Pless

=== Draw ===
==== First qualifier ====
First round
1 | (France) Cyril Saulnier | 4 | 6 | 6
(Czech Republic) Robin Vik | 6 | 4 | 2
(India) Harsh Mankad | 4 | 6^{3}
(United Kingdom) Barry Cowan | 6 | 7^{7}
(Israel) Jonathan Erlich | 6 | 3 | 6^{5}
(Uzbekistan) Vadim Kutsenko | 4 | 6 | 7^{7}
WC | (India) Rishi Sridhar | 4 | 2
6 | (United Kingdom) Arvind Parmar | 6 | 6

Second round
1 | (France) Cyril Saulnier | 7^{7} | 4 | 6
(United Kingdom) Barry Cowan | 6^{3} | 6 | 1
(Uzbekistan) Vadim Kutsenko | 7^{7} | 7^{7}
6 | (United Kingdom) Arvind Parmar | 6^{3} | 6^{4}

Final Round
1 | (France) Cyril Saulnier | 7^{8} | 6
(Uzbekistan) Vadim Kutsenko | 6^{6} | 4

==== Second qualifier ====
First round
2 | (Russia) Nikolay Davydenko | 7^{7} | 2
(Czech Republic) Ota Fukárek | 6^{5} | 2^{r}
(Russia) Sergei Krotiouk | 2 | 5
(Israel) Eyal Ran | 6 | 7
(Russia) Yuri Schukin | 6 | 6
(South Africa) Rik de Voest | 4 | 0
(Uzbekistan) Oleg Ogorodov | 6 | 3 | 6
5 | (Germany) Oliver Gross | 3 | 6 | 3

Second round
2 | (Russia) Nikolay Davydenko | 6 | 6
(Israel) Eyal Ran | 4 | 2
(Russia) Yuri Schukin | 6 | 6
(Uzbekistan) Oleg Ogorodov | 4 | 3

Final Round
2 | (Russia) Nikolay Davydenko | 6 | 6
(Russia) Yuri Schukin | 2 | 2

==== Third qualifier ====
First round
3 | (Italy) Laurence Tieleman | 6 | 7^{7}
(Pakistan) Aisam-ul-Haq Qureshi | 2 | 6^{5}
WC | (India) Kamala Kannan | 3 | 2
(Czech Republic) Petr Kralert | 6 | 6
WC | (India) Vijay Kannan | 7^{7} | 5 | 4
(India) Vishal Uppal | 6^{5} | 7 | 6
(France) Lionel Roux | 7^{9} | 6
7 | (United States) Michael Russell | 6^{7} | 4

Second round
3 | (Italy) Laurence Tieleman | 6 | 7^{8}
(Czech Republic) Petr Kralert | 2 | 6^{6}
(India) Vishal Uppal | 2 | 7^{8} | 2
(France) Lionel Roux | 6 | 6^{6} | 6

Final Round
3 | (Italy) Laurence Tieleman | 2 | 3
(France) Lionel Roux | 6 | 6

==== Fourth qualifier ====
First round
4 | (Germany) Tomas Behrend | 3 | 6 | 6
(Italy) Mosé Navarra | 6 | 2 | 1
(Czech Republic) František Čermák | 7^{7} | 6
(Uzbekistan) Dmitri Tomashevich | 6^{4} | 3
WC | (Sweden) Johan Landsberg | 3 | 3
(Denmark) Kristian Pless | 6 | 6
(Slovakia) Viktor Bruthans | 5 | 6 | 5
8 | (United Kingdom) Martin Lee | 7 | 3 | 7

Second round
4 | (Germany) Tomas Behrend | 6 | 3 | 4
(Slovakia) František Čermák | 3 | 6 | 6
(Denmark) Kristian Pless | 2 | 6 | 6
8 | (United Kingdom) Martin Lee | 6 | 3 | 2

Final Round
(Czech Republic) František Čermák | 3 | 6^{4}
(Denmark) Kristian Pless | 6 | 7^{7}
