= 2001 Gold Flake Open – Doubles =

Doubles
- 2001 Gold Flake Open

Final
- Champions: (Zimbabwe) Byron Black (Zimbabwe) Wayne Black
- Runners-up: (United Kingdom) Barry Cowan (Italy) Mosé Navarra
- Score: 6–4, 6–3

Details
- Draw: 16
- Seeds: 4

Events
Singles	Doubles
- Gold Flake Open

Julien Boutter and Christophe Rochus were the defending champions but did not compete that year.

Byron Black and Wayne Black won in the final 6–4, 6–3 against Barry Cowan and Mosé Navarra.

== Seeds ==
1. (Zimbabwe) Byron Black / (Zimbabwe) Wayne Black (champions)
2. (India) Mahesh Bhupathi / (India) Leander Paes (semifinals)
3. (Israel) Eyal Ran / (Spain) Jairo Velasco, Jr. (quarterfinals)
4. (South Africa) Paul Rosner / (South Africa) Jason Weir-Smith (quarterfinals)

== Draw ==
Key

- Q = Qualifier
- WC = Wild card
- LL = Lucky loser
- Alt = Alternate
- ITF = ITF entry
- PR = Protected ranking
- SR = Special ranking
- SE = Special exempt
- JE = Junior exempt
- JR = Junior Accelerator Programme entrant
- CO = College Accelerator Programme entrant
- NG = Next Gen Accelerator Program entrant
- w/o = Walkover
- r = Retired
- d = Defaulted

First round
1	(Zimbabwe) B Black (Zimbabwe) W Black	4	6	6
(Spain) E Benfele Álvarez (Germany) M Hilpert	6	3	2
(Czech Republic) P Kovačka (Czech Republic) P Kudrnáč	6	6^{3}	4
(Uzbekistan) V Kutsenko (Pakistan) A-u-H Qureshi	1	7^{7}	6
3	(Israel) E Ran (Spain) J Velasco, Jr.	6	6
WC	(India) S Panja (India) S Prahlad	3	4
(Czech Republic) F Čermák (Czech Republic) O Fukárek	6	6
WC	(India) M Ghouse (India) V Uppal	2	4
(Russia) Y Schukin (Russia) A Stoliarov	6^{3}	6	1
WC	(United Kingdom) B Cowan (Italy) M Navarra	7^{7}	3	6
(Sweden) M Norman (Uzbekistan) O Ogorodov	7	4	5
4	(South Africa) P Rosner (South Africa) J Weir-Smith	5	6	7
Q	(Czech Republic) M Tabara (Czech Republic) T Zíb	6	3	6
(Israel) J Erlich (Italy) L Tieleman	1	6	1
(Sweden) J Landsberg (Sweden) A Vinciguerra	2	5
2	(India) M Bhupathi (India) L Paes	6	7

Quarterfinals
1	(Zimbabwe) B Black (Zimbabwe) W Black	6	6
(Uzbekistan) V Kutsenko (Pakistan) A-u-H Qureshi	2	0
3	(Israel) E Ran (Spain) J Velasco, Jr.	4	2
(Czech Republic) F Čermák (Czech Republic) O Fukárek	6	6
WC	(United Kingdom) B Cowan (Italy) M Navarra	4	6	6
4	(South Africa) P Rosner (South Africa) J Weir-Smith	6	3	4
Q	(Czech Republic) M Tabara (Czech Republic) T Zíb	6^{4}	3
2	(India) M Bhupathi (India) L Paes	7^{7}	6

Semifinals
1	(Zimbabwe) B Black (Zimbabwe) W Black	6	6
(Czech Republic) F Čermák (Czech Republic) O Fukárek	3	4
WC	(United Kingdom) B Cowan (Italy) M Navarra	2	7^{8}	6
2	(India) M Bhupathi (India) L Paes	6	6^{6}	4

Final
1	(Zimbabwe) B Black (Zimbabwe) W Black	6	6
WC	(United Kingdom) B Cowan (Italy) M Navarra	4	3

== Qualifying ==
=== Seeds ===
1. (Spain) Tommy Robredo / (Russia) Mikhail Youzhny (final round)
2. (Czech Republic) Michal Tabara / (Czech Republic) Tomáš Zíb (Qualifiers)

=== Qualifiers ===
1. (Czech Republic) Michal Tabara / (Czech Republic) Tomáš Zíb

==== Draw ====
First round
1	(Spain) Tommy Robredo (Russia) Mikhail Youzhny	6	5	6
(India) Fazaluddin Syed (Uzbekistan) Dmitri Tomashevich	4	7	4
WC	(India) Sunil-Kumar Sipaeya (India) Vijayendra Vaad	1	6^{2}
2	(Czech Republic) Michal Tabara (Czech Republic) Tomáš Zíb	6	7^{7}

Final Round
1	(Spain) Tommy Robredo (Russia) Mikhail Youzhny	6^{2}	4
2	(Czech Republic) Michal Tabara (Czech Republic) Tomáš Zíb	7^{7}	6
