= 2001 Salem Open =

- Date: September 24–30
- Edition: 26th
- Category: International Series
- Draw: 32S / 16D
- Prize money: $375,000
- Surface: Hard / outdoor
- Location: Hong Kong

Champions

Singles
- (Chile) Marcelo Ríos

Doubles
- (Germany) Karsten Braasch / (Brazil) André Sá
- Salem Open

The 2001 Salem Open was a men's tennis tournament played on outdoor hard courts in Hong Kong and was part of the International Series of the 2001 ATP Tour. The tournament ran from September 24 through September 30, 2001. Eighth-seeded Marcelo Ríos won the singles title.

== Finals ==
=== Singles ===
(Chile) Marcelo Ríos defeated (Germany) Rainer Schüttler 7–6^{(7–3)}, 6–2

- It was Ríos' 2nd title of the year and the 19th of his career.

=== Doubles ===
(Germany) Karsten Braasch / (Brazil) André Sá defeated (Czech Republic) Petr Luxa / (Czech Republic) Radek Štěpánek 6–0, 7–5

- It was Braasch's 2nd title of the year and the 3rd of his career. It was Sá's only title of the year and the 1st of his career.
