= 2001 Verizon Tennis Challenge – Singles =

Singles
- 2001 Verizon Tennis Challenge

Final
- Champion: (United States) Andy Roddick
- Runner-up: (Belgium) Xavier Malisse
- Score: 6–2, 6–4

Details
- Draw: 32 (4Q / 3WC )
- Seeds: 8

Events
Singles	Doubles
- Verizon Tennis Challenge

Andrew Ilie was the defending champion but lost in the quarterfinals to Xavier Malisse. Andy Roddick won in the final 6–2, 6–4 against Malisse, earning the first title of his career.

== Seeds ==
A champion seed is indicated in bold text while text in italics indicates the round in which that seed was eliminated.

1. (United States) Andre Agassi (first round)
2. (United States) Todd Martin (second round)
3. (United States) Michael Chang (second round)
4. (Germany) Rainer Schüttler (second round)
5. (Australia) Andrew Ilie (quarterfinals)
6. (France) Jérôme Golmard (semifinals)
7. (Belgium) Olivier Rochus (first round)
8. (Sweden) Magnus Gustafsson (second round)

== Draw ==
Key

- Q = Qualifier
- WC = Wild card
- LL = Lucky loser
- Alt = Alternate
- ITF = ITF entry
- PR = Protected ranking
- SR = Special ranking
- SE = Special exempt
- JE = Junior exempt
- JR = Junior Accelerator Programme entrant
- CO = College Accelerator Programme entrant
- NG = Next Gen Accelerator Program entrant
- w/o = Walkover
- r = Retired
- d = Defaulted

First round
1	(United States) A Agassi	4	5
Q	(France) **N Thomann**	**6**	**7**
(Belgium) **C Rochus**	**6**	**6**
(Russia) A Stoliarov	2	2
(Germany) **L Burgsmüller**	**6**	**6**
(Netherlands) J Siemerink	4	3
(United States) P Goldstein	0	1
6	(France) **J Golmard**	**6**	**6**
4	(Germany) **R Schüttler**	**6**	3	**6**
Q	(Argentina) M Rodríguez	3	**6**	3
(Belgium) **X Malisse**	**6**	4	**6**
Q	(Brazil) A Sá	4	**6**	2
(United States) C Woodruff	1	4
(Germany) **J Knippschild**	**6**	**6**
WC	(United States) B Bryan	2	**6**	3
5	(Australia) **A Ilie**	**6**	4	**6**
7	(Belgium) O Rochus	3	**6**	4
(Austria) **S Koubek**	**6**	4	**6**
Q	(Czech Republic) **M Tabara**	**7**	**6**
(Canada) S Lareau	5	3
(France) A Dupuis	4	1
(South Korea) **H-T Lee**	**6**	**6**
(Spain) D Sánchez	5	3
WC/3	(United States) **M Chang**	**7**	**6**
8	(Sweden) **M Gustafsson**	**6**	**7**
(Germany) A Popp	1	5
(Italy) A Gaudenzi	3	3
(Brazil) **F Meligeni**	**6**	**6**
(Netherlands) R Sluiter	2	**6**	4
WC	(United States) **A Roddick**	**6**	4	**6**
(Czech Republic) J Vaněk	3	**6**	6^{5}
2	(United States) **T Martin**	**6**	2	**7^{7}**

Second round
Q	(France) N Thomann	**6**	1	2
(Belgium) **C Rochus**	2	**6**	**6**
(Germany) L Burgsmüller	4	**6**	1
6	(France) **J Golmard**	**6**	2	**6**
4	(Germany) R Schüttler	1	1
(Belgium) **X Malisse**	**6**	**6**
(Germany) J Knippschild	5	**6**	3
5	(Australia) **A Ilie**	**7**	4	**6**
(Austria) **S Koubek**	**3**
Q	(Czech Republic) M Tabara	3	r
(South Korea) **H-T Lee**	**6**	**7^{7}**
WC/3	(United States) M Chang	4	6^{3}
8	(Sweden) M Gustafsson	4	**6**	3
(Brazil) **F Meligeni**	**6**	3	**6**
WC	(United States) **A Roddick**	**7**	**6**
2	(United States) T Martin	5	2

Quarterfinals
(Belgium) C Rochus	1	0
6	(France) **J Golmard**	**6**	**6**
(Belgium) **X Malisse**	**7**	**6**
5	(Australia) A Ilie	5	1
(Austria) **S Koubek**	**7^{7}**	6^{5}	**6**
(South Korea) H-T Lee	6^{2}	**7^{7}**	1
(Brazil) F Meligeni	4	4
WC	(United States) **A Roddick**	**6**	**6**

Semifinals
6	(France) J Golmard	6^{1}	**6**	3
(Belgium) **X Malisse**	**7^{7}**	3	**6**
(Austria) S Koubek	2	2
WC	(United States) **A Roddick**	**6**	**6**

Final
(Belgium) Xavier Malisse	2	4
WC	(United States) **Andy Roddick**	**6**	**6**
