= 2001 Verizon Tennis Challenge =

- Date: April 23–29, 2001
- Edition: 16th
- Category: International Series
- Draw: 32S / 16D
- Prize money: $375,000
- Surface: Clay / outdoor
- Location: Johns Creek, Georgia, US

Champions

Singles
- (United States) Andy Roddick

Doubles
- (India) Mahesh Bhupathi / (India) Leander Paes
← 2000 ·	Verizon Tennis Challenge

The 2001 Verizon Tennis Challenge was a men's tennis tournament played on outdoor clay courts at the Atlanta Athletic Club in Johns Creek, Georgia in the United States and was part of the International Series of the 2001 ATP Tour. It was the 16th and last edition of the tournament and ran from April 23 through April 29, 2001. Unseeded Andy Roddick, who entered on a wildcard, won the singles title.

== Finals ==
=== Singles ===
(United States) Andy Roddick defeated (Belgium) Xavier Malisse 6–2, 6–4

- It was Roddick's first singles title of his career.

=== Doubles ===
(India) Mahesh Bhupathi / (India) Leander Paes defeated (United States) Rick Leach / (Australia) David Macpherson 6–3, 7–6^{(9–7)}

- It was Bhupathi's 1st title of the year and the 18th of his career. It was Paes' 1st title of the year and the 21st of his career.
