= 2001 Salem Open – Doubles =

Doubles
- 2001 Salem Open
- 2000 Champions: (Zimbabwe) Wayne Black (Zimbabwe) Kevin Ullyett

Final
- Champions: (Germany) Karsten Braasch (Brazil) André Sá
- Runners-up: (Czech Republic) Petr Luxa (Czech Republic) Radek Štěpánek
- Score: 6–0, 7–5

Details
- Draw: 16
- Seeds: 4

Events
Singles	Doubles
- Salem Open

Wayne Black and Kevin Ullyett were the defending champions but did not compete that year.

Karsten Braasch and André Sá won in the final 6–0, 7–5 against Petr Luxa and Radek Štěpánek.

== Seeds ==
Champion seeds are indicated in bold text while text in italics indicates the round in which those seeds were eliminated.

1. (Sweden) Jonas Björkman / (Australia) Todd Woodbridge (quarterfinals)
2. (Zimbabwe) Byron Black / (Japan) Thomas Shimada (semifinals)
3. (United States) Rick Leach / (Australia) David Macpherson (quarterfinals)
4. (Australia) Wayne Arthurs / (Australia) Paul Hanley (quarterfinals)

== Draw ==
Key

- Q = Qualifier
- WC = Wild card
- LL = Lucky loser
- Alt = Alternate
- ITF = ITF entry
- PR = Protected ranking
- SR = Special ranking
- SE = Special exempt
- JE = Junior exempt
- JR = Junior Accelerator Programme entrant
- CO = College Accelerator Programme entrant
- NG = Next Gen Accelerator Program entrant
- w/o = Walkover
- r = Retired
- d = Defaulted

First round
1	(Sweden) **J Björkman** (Australia) **T Woodbridge**	**7^{7}**	**6**
(United States) S Humphries (United States) J Thomas	6^{3}	2
WC	(South Korea) H-T Lee (United States) C Mamiit	0	6^{3}
(Germany) **K Braasch** (Brazil) **A Sá**	**6**	**7^{7}**
4	(Australia) **W Arthurs** (Australia) **P Hanley**	**6**	**6**
WC	(Hong Kong) J Hui (Australia) A Ross	4	4
(United States) J Gimelstob (Netherlands) S Groen	3	1
(Sweden) **S Aspelin** (Australia) **A Kratzmann**	**6**	**6**
(Czech Republic) **P Luxa** (Czech Republic) **R Štěpánek**	**6**	**7^{8}**
(Sweden) J Landsberg (United States) J Waite	4	6^{6}
(South Africa) J-L de Jager (South Africa) R Koenig	**6**	6^{3}	1
3	(United States) **R Leach** (Australia) **D Macpherson**	3	**7^{7}**	**6**
WC	(Israel) H Levy (Thailand) P Srichaphan	4	**6**	5
WC	(Russia) **M Safin** (Armenia) **S Sargsian**	**6**	3	**7**
(United States) D Bowen (The Bahamas) M Merklein	4	4
2	(Zimbabwe) **B Black** (Japan) **T Shimada**	**6**	**6**

Quarterfinals
1	(Sweden) J Björkman (Australia) T Woodbridge	5	r
(Germany) **K Braasch** (Brazil) **A Sá**	**5**
4	(Australia) W Arthurs (Australia) P Hanley	**7^{8}**	6^{5}	6^{4}
(Sweden) **S Aspelin** (Australia) **A Kratzmann**	6^{6}	**7^{7}**	**7^{7}**
(Czech Republic) **P Luxa** (Czech Republic) **R Štěpánek**	**7^{7}**	**7^{7}**
3	(United States) R Leach (Australia) D Macpherson	6^{4}	6^{4}
WC	(Russia) M Safin (Armenia) S Sargsian	4	2
2	(Zimbabwe) **B Black** (Japan) **T Shimada**	**6**	**6**

Semifinals
(Germany) **K Braasch** (Brazil) **A Sá**	**6**	**7^{7}**
(Sweden) S Aspelin (Australia) A Kratzmann	4	6^{5}
(Czech Republic) **P Luxa** (Czech Republic) **R Štěpánek**	2	**7**	**6**
2	(Zimbabwe) B Black (Japan) T Shimada	**6**	5	3

Final
(Germany) **Karsten Braasch** (Brazil) **André Sá**	**6**	**7**
(Czech Republic) Petr Luxa (Czech Republic) Radek Štěpánek	0	5
