= 2001 Verizon Tennis Challenge – Doubles =

Doubles
- 2001 Verizon Tennis Challenge
- 2000 Champions: (South Africa) Ellis Ferreira (United States) Rick Leach

Final
- Champions: (India) Mahesh Bhupathi (India) Leander Paes
- Runners-up: (United States) Rick Leach (Australia) David Macpherson
- Score: 6–3, 7–6^{(9–7)}

Details
- Draw: 16
- Seeds: 4

Events
Singles	Doubles
← 2000 ·	Verizon Tennis Challenge

Ellis Ferreira and Rick Leach were the defending champions but they competed with different partners that year, Ferreira with Grant Stafford and Leach with David Macpherson.

Ferreira and Stafford lost in the semifinals to Leach and Macpherson.

Leach and Macpherson lost in the final 6–3, 7–6^{(9–7)} against Mahesh Bhupathi and Leander Paes.

== Seeds ==
Champion seeds are indicated in bold text while text in italics indicates the round in which those seeds were eliminated.

1. (United States) Rick Leach / (Australia) David Macpherson (final)
2. (United States) Bob Bryan / (United States) Mike Bryan (semifinals)
3. (South Africa) Ellis Ferreira / (South Africa) Grant Stafford (semifinals)
4. (India) **Mahesh Bhupathi** / (India) **Leander Paes (champions)**

== Draw ==
=== Key ===
- Q = Qualifier
- WC = Wild card
- LL = Lucky loser
- Alt = Alternate
- SE = Special exempt
- PR = Protected ranking
- ITF = ITF entry
- JE = Junior exempt
- w/o = Walkover
- r = Retired
- d = Defaulted
- SR = Special ranking

First round
1	(United States) **R Leach** (Australia) **D Macpherson**	**6**	3	**6**
(South Africa) J Coetzee (South Africa) B Haygarth	3	**6**	3
Q	(Austria) **J Knowle** (Switzerland) **L Manta**	**6**	**6**
WC	(United States) D Flach (United States) A Janasik	3	3
3	(South Africa) **E Ferreira** (South Africa) **G Stafford**	**7**	**6**
WC	(United States) L Jensen (United States) M Jensen	5	2
(Germany) K Braasch (Germany) J Knippschild	**6**	6^{9}	4
(South Africa) **C Haggard** (Netherlands) **J Siemerink**	4	**7^{11}**	**6**
(Japan) **T Shimada** (United States) **E Taino**	**6**	**6**
(Italy) A Gaudenzi (Argentina) S Roitman	4	0
WC	(United States) P Goldstein (United States) A Roddick	4	4
4	(India) **M Bhupathi** (India) **L Paes**	**6**	**6**
(Argentina) **G Etlis** (Argentina) **M Rodríguez**	**7**	**6**
(Australia) P Kilderry (Australia) P Tramacchi	5	4
(United States) J Thomas (United States) J Waite	4	3
2	(United States) **B Bryan** (United States) **M Bryan**	**6**	**6**

Quarterfinals
1	(United States) **R Leach** (Australia) **D Macpherson**	**6**	**6**
Q	(Austria) J Knowle (Switzerland) L Manta	3	3
3	(South Africa) **E Ferreira** (South Africa) **G Stafford**	**7**	**6**
(South Africa) C Haggard (Netherlands) J Siemerink	5	3
(Japan) T Shimada (United States) E Taino	2	4
4	(India) **M Bhupathi** (India) **L Paes**	**6**	**6**
(Argentina) G Etlis (Argentina) M Rodríguez	**7**	6^{3}	4
2	(United States) **B Bryan** (United States) **M Bryan**	5	**7^{7}**	**6**

Semifinals
1	(United States) **R Leach** (Australia) **D Macpherson**	**7^{7}**	2	**7^{7}**
3	(South Africa) E Ferreira (South Africa) G Stafford	6^{5}	**6**	6^{4}
4	(India) **M Bhupathi** (India) **L Paes**	**7**	**7^{7}**
2	(United States) B Bryan (United States) M Bryan	5	6^{2}

Final
1	(United States) Rick Leach (Australia) David Macpherson	3	6^{7}
4	(India) **Mahesh Bhupathi** (India) **Leander Paes**	**6**	**7^{9}**
