= 2001 Salem Open – Singles =

Singles
- 2001 Salem Open
- 2000 Champion: (Germany) Nicolas Kiefer

Final
- Champion: (Chile) Marcelo Ríos
- Runner-up: (Germany) Rainer Schüttler
- Score: 7–6^{(7–3)}, 6–2

Details
- Draw: 32
- Seeds: 8

Events
Singles	Doubles
- Salem Open

Nicolas Kiefer was the defending champion but did not compete that year.

Marcelo Ríos won in the final 7–6^{(7–3)}, 6–2 against Rainer Schüttler.

== Seeds ==
A champion seed is indicated in bold text while text in italics indicates the round in which that seed was eliminated.

1. (Spain) Juan Carlos Ferrero (quarterfinals)
2. (Russia) Marat Safin (second round)
3. (France) Sébastien Grosjean (quarterfinals)
4. (United States) Andy Roddick (first round)
5. (Australia) Mark Philippoussis (second round)
6. (Sweden) Jonas Björkman (quarterfinals)
7. (United States) Michael Chang (second round)
8. (Chile) **Marcelo Ríos (champion)**

== Draw ==
Key

- Q = Qualifier
- WC = Wild card
- LL = Lucky loser
- Alt = Alternate
- ITF = ITF entry
- PR = Protected ranking
- SR = Special ranking
- SE = Special exempt
- JE = Junior exempt
- JR = Junior Accelerator Programme entrant
- CO = College Accelerator Programme entrant
- NG = Next Gen Accelerator Program entrant
- w/o = Walkover
- r = Retired
- d = Defaulted

First round
1	(Spain) **J C Ferrero**	**6**	4	**6**
Q	(Thailand) P Srichaphan	3	**6**	3
Q	(Switzerland) I Heuberger	6^{5}	4
Q	(United States) **C Mamiit**	**7^{7}**	**6**
(United States) M Russell	6^{2}	6^{3}
(Germany) **R Schüttler**	**7^{7}**	**7^{7}**
(Israel) H Levy	3	5
5	(Australia) **M Philippoussis**	**6**	**7**
4	(United States) A Roddick	3	**6**	3/r
(Brazil) **A Sá**	**6**	4	**3**
(Spain) F Clavet	6^{3}	6^{4}
(Switzerland) **M Kratochvil**	**7^{7}**	**7^{7}**
(Australia) **W Arthurs**	**6**	**6**
WC	(Australia) T Woodbridge	2	2
(Armenia) S Sargsian	2	4
6	(Sweden) **J Björkman**	**6**	**6**
8	(Chile) **M Ríos**	**6**	**6**
Q	(Czech Republic) D Vacek	2	1
(South Korea) H-T Lee	1	5
(Denmark) **K Carlsen**	**6**	**7**
(Spain) Á Calatrava	**6**	6^{5}	3
(Chile) **N Massú**	2	**7^{7}**	**6**
(Germany) L Burgsmüller	6^{4}	4
3	(France) **S Grosjean**	**7^{7}**	**6**
7	(United States) **M Chang**	**7^{7}**	**7**
(United States) J Blake	6^{3}	5
(Australia) **A Ilie**	4	**6**	**7^{7}**
WC	(Japan) G Motomura	**6**	4	6^{3}
(South Africa) N Godwin	**6**	4	3
(Sweden) **M Larsson**	2	**6**	**6**
WC	(Hong Kong) J Hui	3	2
2	(Russia) **M Safin**	**6**	**6**

Second round
1	(Spain) **J C Ferrero**	4	**7**	**7^{7}**
Q	(United States) C Mamiit	**6**	5	6^{3}
(Germany) **R Schüttler**	**7^{7}**	4	**6**
5	(Australia) M Philippoussis	6^{5}	**6**	3
(Brazil) **A Sá**	**7**	**6**
(Switzerland) M Kratochvil	5	4
(Australia) W Arthurs	2	4
6	(Sweden) **J Björkman**	**6**	**6**
8	(Chile) **M Ríos**	**7**	**6**
(Denmark) K Carlsen	5	3
(Chile) N Massú	6^{2}	**6**	4
3	(France) **S Grosjean**	**7^{7}**	3	**6**
7	(United States) M Chang	3	1	r
(Australia) **A Ilie**	**6**	**4**
(Sweden) **M Larsson**	**6**	3	**6**
2	(Russia) M Safin	2	**6**	4

Quarterfinals
1	(Spain) J C Ferrero	3	6^{6}
(Germany) **R Schüttler**	**6**	**7^{8}**
(Brazil) **A Sá**	**6**	**6**
6	(Sweden) J Björkman	1	3
8	(Chile) **M Ríos**	**6**	**6**
3	(France) S Grosjean	2	3
(Australia) **A Ilie**	**6**	**6**
(Sweden) M Larsson	3	3

Semifinals
(Germany) **R Schüttler**	**6**	**6**
(Brazil) A Sá	4	0
8	(Chile) **M Ríos**	**6**	**6**
(Australia) A Ilie	4	2

Final
(Germany) Rainer Schüttler	6^{3}	2
8	(Chile) **Marcelo Ríos**	**7^{7}**	**6**
