= Mosé Navarra =

Italian tennis player (born 1974)

- Country (sports): Italy
- Residence: Borghetto Santo Spirito, Italy
- Born: July 18, 1974 (age 51) Loano, Italy
- Height: 5 ft 11 in (1.80 m)
- Turned pro: 1993
- Plays: Left-handed
- Prize money: $309,483

Singles
- Career record: 5–9
- Career titles: 0; 3 Challenger, 0 Futures
- Highest ranking: No. 119 (14 June 1999)

Grand Slam singles results
- Australian Open: Q3 (2001)
- French Open: 2R (1999)
- Wimbledon: 3R (1996)
- US Open: Q3 (1996)

Doubles
- Career record: 8–10
- Career titles: 0; 3 Challenger, 0 Futures
- Highest ranking: No. 170 (1 October 2001)

Grand Slam doubles results
- Wimbledon: 2R (1999)
- US Open: Q2 (1998)
- Last updated on: 19 October 2021.

Mosé Navarra (born 18 July 1974, in Loano) is a retired tennis player from Italy.

Navarra turned professional in 1993. The left-hander reached his highest individual ranking on the ATP Tour on 14 June 1999, when he became the number 119 in the world.

== Personal life ==
Navarra was married to Indian model Sheetal Mallar for three years.

== Junior Grand Slam finals ==
=== Singles: 1 (1 runner-up) ===
Result	Year	Tournament	Surface	Opponent	Score
Loss	1992	French Open	Clay	(Romania) Andrei Pavel	1–6, 6–3, 3–6

== ATP career finals ==
=== Doubles: 1 (1 runner-up) ===
Legend Grand Slam tournaments (0–0) ATP World Tour Finals (0–0) ATP World Tour Masters Series (0–0) ATP World Tour Championship Series (0–0) ATP World Tour World Series (0–1)	Titles by surface Hard (0–1) Clay (0–0) Grass (0–0) Carpet (0–0)	Titles by setting Outdoor (0–1) Indoor (0–0)

Result	W–L	Date	Tournament	Tier	Surface	Partner	Opponents	Score
Loss	0–1	Jan 2001	Chennai, India	World Series	Hard	(United Kingdom) Barry Cowan	(Zimbabwe) Byron Black (Zimbabwe) Wayne Black	4–6, 3–6

== ATP Challenger and ITF Futures finals ==
=== Singles: 5 (3–2) ===
Legend ATP Challenger (3–1) ITF Futures (0–1)	Finals by surface Hard (1–0) Clay (0–0) Grass (1–1) Carpet (1–1)

Result	W–L	Date	Tournament	Tier	Surface	Opponent	Score
Loss	0–1	Feb 1998	Great Britain F1, Bramhall	Futures	Carpet	(Netherlands) Marc Merry	6–4, 6–7, 6–7
Loss	0–2	Feb 1999	Lucknow, India	Challenger	Grass	(Finland) Tuomas Ketola	3–6, 4–6
Win	1–2	Mar 1999	Singapore, Singapore	Challenger	Hard	(Spain) Alberto Martín	6–2, 6–2
Win	2–2	Jul 2000	Manchester, United Kingdom	Challenger	Grass	(United Kingdom) Martin Lee	6–4, 6–3
Win	3–2	Dec 2000	Milan, Italy	Challenger	Carpet	(Italy) Filippo Messori	6–3, 7–6^{(7–3)}

=== Doubles: 7 (3–4) ===
Legend ATP Challenger (3–3) ITF Futures (0–1)	Finals by surface Hard (0–2) Clay (1–1) Grass (1–0) Carpet (1–1)

Result	W–L	Date	Tournament	Tier	Surface	Partner	Opponents	Score
Loss	0–1	Sep 1995	Singapore, Singapore	Challenger	Hard	(Italy) Nicola Bruno	(United Kingdom) Chris Wilkinson (Germany) Martin Zumpft	6–4, 1–6, 4–6
Win	1–1	Jun 1996	Weiden, Germany	Challenger	Clay	(United States) Jonathan Leach	(Soviet Union) Ģirts Dzelde (Sweden) Tomas Nydahl	7–6, 7–5
Loss	1–2	Jul 1996	Quito, Ecuador	Challenger	Clay	(Italy) Nicola Bruno	(Ecuador) Pablo Campana (Ecuador) Nicolás Lapentti	4–6, 4–6
Loss	1–3	Aug 1997	Olbia, Italy	Challenger	Hard	(Italy) Stefano Pescosolido	(United States) Geoff Grant (Venezuela) Maurice Ruah	6–3, 2–6, 5–7
Loss	1–4	Feb 1998	Great Britain F1, Bramhall	Futures	Carpet	(Netherlands) Marc Merry	(Sweden) Mathias Hellström (Sweden) Fredrik Lovén	6–7, 1–6
Win	2–4	Mar 1998	Magdeburg, Germany	Challenger	Carpet	(Israel) Eyal Erlich	(South Africa) Marcos Ondruska (United Kingdom) Chris Wilkinson	4–6, 6–1, 6–4
Win	3–4	Jul 1998	Manchester, United Kingdom	Challenger	Grass	(Italy) Stefano Pescosolido	(Australia) Wayne Arthurs (Australia) Ben Ellwood	6–1, 6–7, 7–6

== Performance timelines ==
Key
W	F	SF	QF	#R	RR	Q#	DNQ	A	NH

(W) winner; (F) finalist; (SF) semifinalist; (QF) quarterfinalist; (#R) rounds 4, 3, 2, 1; (RR) round-robin stage; (Q#) qualification round; (DNQ) did not qualify; (A) absent; (NH) not held; (SR) strike rate (events won / competed); (W–L) win–loss record.

=== Singles ===
Tournament	1993	1994	1995	1996	1997	1998	1999	2000	2001	SR	W–L	Win %
Grand Slam tournaments
Australian Open	A	A	A	A	Q1	A	A	A	Q3	0 / 0	0–0	–
French Open	A	A	A	A	Q1	1R	2R	Q3	Q2	0 / 2	1–2	33%
Wimbledon	A	A	A	3R	Q2	Q1	Q1	Q2	Q2	0 / 1	2–1	67%
US Open	A	A	Q2	Q3	Q2	Q1	Q1	Q2	Q2	0 / 0	0–0	–
Win–loss	0–0	0–0	0–0	2–1	0–0	0–1	1–1	0–0	0–0	0 / 3	3–3	50%
ATP Masters Series
Miami	A	A	A	A	Q1	A	Q2	A	A	0 / 0	0–0	–
Monte Carlo	A	A	A	A	A	A	Q1	A	A	0 / 0	0–-0	–
Rome	Q3	A	Q1	A	Q1	Q2	Q1	A	1R	0 / 1	0–1	0%
Cincinnati	A	A	A	A	A	A	Q2	A	A	0 / 0	0–0	–
Win–loss	0–0	0–0	0–0	0–0	0–0	0–0	0–0	0–0	0–1	0 / 1	0–1	0%

=== Doubles ===
Tournament	1992	1993	1994	1995	1996	1997	1998	1999	2000	2001	2002	SR	W–L	Win %
Grand Slam tournaments
Australian Open	A	A	A	A	A	A	A	A	A	A	A	0 / 0	0–0	–
French Open	A	A	A	A	A	A	A	A	A	A	A	0 / 0	0–0	–
Wimbledon	A	A	A	A	Q1	Q1	Q2	2R	A	Q1	A	0 / 1	1–1	50%
US Open	A	A	A	A	Q1	A	Q2	A	A	A	A	0 / 0	0–0	–
Win–loss	0–0	0–0	0–0	0–0	0–0	0–0	0–0	1–1	0–0	0–0	0–0	0 / 1	1–1	50%
ATP Masters Series
Rome	1R	Q1	A	A	A	A	Q1	1R	A	2R	1R	0 / 4	1–4	20%
Win–loss	0–1	0–0	0–0	0–0	0–0	0–0	0–0	0–1	0–0	1–1	0–1	0 / 4	1–4	20%
