= Wayne Black =

Zimbabwean tennis player

- Country (sports): Zimbabwe
- Residence: Harare, Zimbabwe
- Born: 14 November 1973 (age 52) Harare, Zimbabwe
- Height: 1.70 m (5 ft 7 in)
- Turned pro: 1994
- Retired: 2006
- Plays: Right-handed (two-handed backhand)
- Prize money: $3,300,258

Singles
- Career record: 78–103
- Career titles: 0
- Highest ranking: No. 69 (30 March 1998)

Grand Slam singles results
- Australian Open: 4R (1999)
- French Open: 1R (1997, 1998, 1999)
- Wimbledon: 3R (2001)
- US Open: 2R (1998)

Doubles
- Career record: 319–203
- Career titles: 18
- Highest ranking: No. 4 (31 January 2005)

Grand Slam doubles results
- Australian Open: W (2005)
- French Open: QF (2004)
- Wimbledon: SF (1997, 1998, 2005)
- US Open: W (2001)

Mixed doubles
- Career titles: 2

Grand Slam mixed doubles results
- Australian Open: QF (2005)
- French Open: W (2002)
- Wimbledon: W (2004)
- US Open: SF (2003)

Wayne Hamilton Black (born 14 November 1973) is a Zimbabwean tennis coach and a former professional player. Black turned professional in 1994 and reached his highest singles ranking of No. 69 on 30 March 1998. He is the son of former player Don Black, the younger brother of fellow ATP Tour player Byron Black, with the pair forming the mainstay of the Zimbabwe Davis Cup team for over a decade. He was the coach of Estonian player Mark Lajal in 2024-2025.

Black struggled for consistency in his singles game and by the new millennium had converted to a doubles specialist, in which he experienced greater success. He won two men's doubles Grand Slam titles at the 2001 U.S. Open and 2005 Australian Open with compatriot Kevin Ullyett, as well as two Grand Slam mixed doubles titles at the 2002 French Open and 2004 Wimbledon with sister Cara Black.

He reached his career-high doubles ranking of world No. 4 on 31 January 2005, following his second Grand Slam title win, and retired from professional play in 2006.

== Early life and education ==
Black and his siblings Byron and Cara were drilled in tennis from a young age by their father; they frequently played at least an hour of tennis before the school day began, another hour after school, followed by a third hour once homework had been completed.

He was educated at St. John's College in Harare and the University of Southern California, but left before completing his degree to go professional.

== Personal life ==
Black married Kazakhstani tennis player Irina Selyutina and settled in the United Kingdom following retirement, where both of his children were born. He competed in club tennis for Sutton Tennis & Squash Club for a period of time alongside his former coach Miles Maclagan. Citing a failure to get used to the colder climate of London, he later moved back to his home country and ran a tourist lodge with his wife.

== Career finals ==
=== Doubles: 33 (18 titles / 15 runner-ups) ===
| Legend Grand Slam (2–1) Tennis Masters Cup (0–1) ATP Masters Series (5–6) ATP International Series Gold (1–2) ATP Tour (10–5) | Titles by surface Hard (14–11) Clay (2–2) Grass (1–0) Carpet (1–2) |

| Result | W-L | Date | Tournament | Surface | Partner | Opponents | Score |
|---|---|---|---|---|---|---|---|
| Loss | 0–1 | May 1998 | St. Poelten, Austria | Clay | (South Africa) David Adams | (United States) Jim Grabb (Australia) David Macpherson | 4–6, 4–6 |
| Win | 1–1 | Feb 1999 | Dubai, UAE | Hard | (Australia) Sandon Stolle | (South Africa) David Adams (South Africa) John-Laffnie de Jager | 4–6, 6–1, 6–4 |
| Win | 2–1 | Mar 1999 | Indian Wells, United States | Hard | (Australia) Sandon Stolle | (South Africa) Ellis Ferreira (United States) Rick Leach | 7–6^{(7–4)}, 6–3 |
| Win | 3–1 | Mar 1999 | Miami, United States | Hard | (Australia) Sandon Stolle | (Germany) Boris Becker (United States) Jan-Michael Gambill | 6–1, 6–1 |
| Loss | 3–2 | Apr 1999 | Chennai, India | Hard | (South Africa) Neville Godwin | (India) Mahesh Bhupathi (India) Leander Paes | 6–4, 5–7, 4–6 |
| Loss | 3–3 | Apr 1999 | Tokyo, Japan | Hard | (United States) Brian MacPhie | (United States) Jeff Tarango (Czech Republic) Daniel Vacek | 3–4, RET. |
| Loss | 3–4 | Jan 2000 | Australian Open, Melbourne | Hard | (Australia) Andrew Kratzmann | (South Africa) Ellis Ferreira (United States) Rick Leach | 4–6, 6–3, 3–6, 6–3, 16–18 |
| Win | 4–4 | Oct 2000 | Hong Kong | Hard | (Zimbabwe) Kevin Ullyett | (Slovakia) Dominik Hrbatý (Germany) David Prinosil | 6–1, 6–2 |
| Win | 5–4 | Jan 2001 | Chennai, India | Hard | (Zimbabwe) Byron Black | (United Kingdom) Barry Cowan (Italy) Mosé Navarra | 6–4, 6–3 |
| Win | 6–4 | Feb 2001 | Copenhagen, Denmark | Hard (i) | (Zimbabwe) Kevin Ullyett | (Czech Republic) Jiří Novák (Czech Republic) David Rikl | 6–3, 6–3 |
| Win | 7–4 | Oct 2001 | U.S. Open, New York City | Hard | (Zimbabwe) Kevin Ullyett | (United States) Donald Johnson (United States) Jared Palmer | 7–6^{(11–9)}, 2–6, 6–3 |
| Win | 8–4 | Jan 2002 | Adelaide, Australia | Hard | (Zimbabwe) Kevin Ullyett | (United States) Bob Bryan (United States) Mike Bryan | 7–5, 6–2 |
| Win | 9–4 | Mar 2002 | San Jose, United States | Hard (i) | (Zimbabwe) Kevin Ullyett | (South Africa) John-Laffnie de Jager (South Africa) Robbie Koenig | 6–3, 4–6, [10–5] |
| Loss | 9–5 | May 2002 | Rome, Italy | Clay | (Zimbabwe) Kevin Ullyett | (Czech Republic) Martin Damm (Czech Republic) Cyril Suk | 5–7, 5–7 |
| Win | 10–5 | Jun 2002 | London/Queen's Club, England | Grass | (Zimbabwe) Kevin Ullyett | (India) Mahesh Bhupathi (Belarus) Max Mirnyi | 7–5, 6–3 |
| Win | 11–5 | Aug 2002 | Washington, D.C., United States | Hard | (Zimbabwe) Kevin Ullyett | (United States) Bob Bryan (United States) Mike Bryan | 3–6, 6–3, 7–5 |
| Win | 12–5 | Oct 2002 | Lyon, France | Carpet | (Zimbabwe) Kevin Ullyett | (The Bahamas) Mark Knowles (Canada) Daniel Nestor | 6–4, 3–6, 7–6^{(7–3)} |
| Win | 13–5 | Oct 2002 | Stockholm, Sweden | Hard (i) | (Zimbabwe) Kevin Ullyett | (Australia) Wayne Arthurs (Australia) Paul Hanley | 6–4, 2–6, 7–6^{(7–4)} |
| Loss | 13–6 | Mar 2003 | Dubai, UAE | Hard | (Zimbabwe) Kevin Ullyett | (India) Leander Paes (Czech Republic) David Rikl | 3–6, 0–6 |
| Win | 14–6 | May 2003 | Munich, Germany | Clay | (Zimbabwe) Kevin Ullyett | (Australia) Joshua Eagle (United States) Jared Palmer | 6–3, 7–5 |
| Loss | 14–7 | Oct 2003 | Moscow, Russia | Carpet | (Zimbabwe) Kevin Ullyett | (India) Mahesh Bhupathi (Belarus) Max Mirnyi | 3–6, 5–7 |
| Loss | 14–8 | Oct 2003 | Madrid, Spain | Hard (i) | (Zimbabwe) Kevin Ullyett | (India) Mahesh Bhupathi (Belarus) Max Mirnyi | 2–6, 6–2, 3–6 |
| Loss | 14–9 | Mar 2004 | Indian Wells, United States | Hard | (Zimbabwe) Kevin Ullyett | (France) Arnaud Clément (France) Sébastien Grosjean | 3–6, 6–4, 5–7 |
| Win | 15–9 | Apr 2004 | Miami, United States | Hard | (Zimbabwe) Kevin Ullyett | (Sweden) Jonas Björkman (Australia) Todd Woodbridge | 6–2, 7–6^{(14–12)} |
| Win | 16–9 | May 2004 | Hamburg, Germany | Clay | (Zimbabwe) Kevin Ullyett | (United States) Bob Bryan (United States) Mike Bryan | 6–4, 6–2 |
| Loss | 16–10 | Jul 2004 | Indianapolis, United States | Hard | (Zimbabwe) Kevin Ullyett | (Australia) Jordan Kerr (United States) Jim Thomas | 7–6^{(9–7)}, 6–7^{(3–7)}, 3–6 |
| Loss | 16–11 | Nov 2004 | Paris, France | Carpet | (Zimbabwe) Kevin Ullyett | (Sweden) Jonas Björkman (Australia) Todd Woodbridge | 3–6, 4–6 |
| Loss | 16–12 | Nov 2004 | Tennis Masters Cup, Houston | Hard | (Zimbabwe) Kevin Ullyett | (United States) Bob Bryan (United States) Mike Bryan | 6–4, 5–7, 4–6, 2–6 |
| Win | 17–12 | Jan 2005 | Australian Open, Melbourne | Hard | (Zimbabwe) Kevin Ullyett | (United States) Bob Bryan (United States) Mike Bryan | 6–4, 6–4 |
| Loss | 17–13 | Apr 2005 | Miami, United States | Hard | (Zimbabwe) Kevin Ullyett | (Sweden) Jonas Björkman (Belarus) Max Mirnyi | 1–6, 2–6 |
| Loss | 17–14 | Aug 2005 | Washington, D.C., United States | Hard | (Zimbabwe) Kevin Ullyett | (United States) Bob Bryan (United States) Mike Bryan | 4–6, 2–6 |
| Win | 18–14 | Aug 2005 | Montreal, Canada | Hard | (Zimbabwe) Kevin Ullyett | (Israel) Jonathan Erlich (Israel) Andy Ram | 6–7^{(5–7)}, 6–3, 6–0 |
| Loss | 18–15 | Aug 2005 | Cincinnati, United States | Hard | (Zimbabwe) Kevin Ullyett | (Sweden) Jonas Björkman (Belarus) Max Mirnyi | 6–7^{(3–7)}, 2–6 |

== Doubles performance timeline ==
Key
| W | F | SF | QF | #R | RR | Q# | DNQ | A | NH |

(W) winner; (F) finalist; (SF) semifinalist; (QF) quarterfinalist; (#R) rounds 4, 3, 2, 1; (RR) round-robin stage; (Q#) qualification round; (DNQ) did not qualify; (A) absent; (NH) not held; (SR) strike rate (events won / competed); (W–L) win–loss record.

| Tournament | 1992 | 1993 | 1994 | 1995 | 1996 | 1997 | 1998 | 1999 | 2000 | 2001 | 2002 | 2003 | 2004 | 2005 | 2006 | Career SR | Career win–loss |
|---|---|---|---|---|---|---|---|---|---|---|---|---|---|---|---|---|---|
Grand Slam tournaments
| Australian Open | A | A | A | A | 1R | A | 2R | 3R | F | QF | QF | 3R | QF | W | A | 1 / 9 | 25–8 |
| French Open | A | A | A | A | 1R | 3R | 3R | 3R | 2R | 3R | 3R | 2R | QF | 1R | A | 0 / 10 | 15–10 |
| Wimbledon | A | A | A | A | 1R | SF | SF | QF | 1R | 1R | 2R | 3R | QF | SF | 1R | 0 / 11 | 21–11 |
| U.S. Open | A | A | A | A | A | SF | 1R | QF | 1R | W | QF | 3R | QF | SF | A | 1 / 9 | 25–8 |
| Grand Slam SR | 0 / 0 | 0 / 0 | 0 / 0 | 0 / 0 | 0 / 3 | 0 / 3 | 0 / 4 | 0 / 4 | 0 / 4 | 1 / 4 | 0 / 4 | 0 / 4 | 0 / 4 | 1 / 4 | 0 / 1 | 2 / 39 | N/A |
| Annual win–loss | 0–0 | 0–0 | 0–0 | 0–0 | 0–3 | 10–3 | 7–4 | 10–4 | 6–4 | 11–3 | 9–4 | 7–4 | 12–4 | 14–3 | 0–1 | 0–0 | 86–37 |
Masters Series
| Indian Wells | A | A | 1R | A | A | A | 1R | W | 2R | 1R | QF | A | F | QF | A | 1 / 8 | 14–7 |
| Miami | A | A | A | A | A | A | 3R | W | 2R | 3R | 3R | 2R | W | F | A | 2 / 8 | 18–6 |
| Monte Carlo | A | A | A | A | A | A | A | A | A | A | A | A | A | A | A | 0 / 0 | 0–0 |
| Rome | A | A | A | A | A | A | A | 1R | 1R | 1R | F | 2R | QF | 2R | A | 0 / 7 | 5–7 |
| Hamburg | A | A | A | A | A | A | A | A | 1R | 2R | 1R | 2R | W | 2R | A | 1 / 6 | 5–5 |
| Canada | A | A | A | A | A | A | QF | 2R | A | 2R | 2R | 1R | 2R | W | A | 1 / 7 | 8–6 |
| Cincinnati | A | A | A | 2R | A | A | QF | QF | 1R | 1R | 2R | 1R | 2R | F | A | 0 / 9 | 8–9 |
| Madrid (Stuttgart) | A | A | A | A | A | 2R | A | A | A | 2R | 2R | F | A | SF | A | 0 / 5 | 6–5 |
| Paris | A | A | A | 1R | A | 1R | 1R | 2R | A | SF | 2R | QF | F | SF | A | 0 / 9 | 8–9 |
| Masters Series SR | 0 / 0 | 0 / 0 | 0 / 1 | 0 / 2 | 0 / 0 | 0 / 2 | 0 / 5 | 2 / 6 | 0 / 5 | 0 / 8 | 0 / 8 | 0 / 7 | 2 / 7 | 1 / 8 | 0 / 0 | 5 / 59 | N/A |
| Annual win–loss | 0–0 | 0–0 | 0–1 | 1–2 | 0–0 | 1–2 | 5–5 | 11–4 | 1–5 | 5–8 | 9–8 | 5–7 | 17–5 | 17–7 | 0–0 | 0–0 | 72–54 |
| Year-end ranking | 541 | 1056 | 302 | 146 | 158 | 38 | 46 | 14 | 42 | 12 | 13 | 23 | 8 | 5 | 576 | N/A | |
