= Michal Tabara =

Czech tennis player (born 1979)

- Country (sports): Czech Republic
- Residence: Napajedla, Czech Republic
- Born: 16 October 1979 (age 45); Uherské Hradiště, Czechoslovakia
- Height: 1.75 m (5 ft 9 in)
- Turned pro: 1997
- Retired: 2009
- Plays: Right-handed (two-handed backhand)
- Prize money: $842,256

Singles
- Career record: 40–55
- Career titles: 1
- Highest ranking: No. 47 (23 July 2001)

Grand Slam singles results
- Australian Open: 3R (2001)
- French Open: 1R (2001, 2002, 2005)
- Wimbledon: 1R (2001, 2005)
- US Open: 3R (2004)

Doubles
- Career record: 7–9
- Career titles: 1
- Highest ranking: No. 142 (23 August 1999)

Michal Tabara (born 16 October 1979) is a former tennis player from the Czech Republic, who turned professional in 1997. The right-hander has won one singles title (2001, Chennai) so far in his career. Tabara reached his highest singles ATP-ranking on 23 July 2001, when he became world No. 47.

Tabara was involved in a minor controversy at the 2001 US Open. After losing a first-round match to Justin Gimelstob in five sets, Tabara, who was allegedly frustrated by Gimelstob's frequent injury time-outs, spat in Gimelstob's direction as they approached the net to shake hands. Tabara was subsequently fined $1,000 for unsportmanslike behavior.

== Tennis career ==
=== Juniors ===
As a junior Tabara reached as high as No. 9 in the junior world singles rankings in 1996 (and No. 24 in doubles).

== Singles titles ==
=== Wins (1) ===
Legend (singles)
Grand Slam (0)
Tennis Masters Cup (0)
ATP Masters Series (0)
ATP Tour (1)

| No. | Date | Tournament | Surface | Opponent | Score |
|---|---|---|---|---|---|
| 1. | 8 January 2001 | Chennai, India | Hard | (Russia) Andrei Stoliarov | 6–2, 7–6^{(7–4)} |

== Doubles titles ==
=== Wins (1) ===
Legend
Grand Slam (0)
Tennis Masters Cup (0)
ATP Masters Series (0)
ATP Tour (1)

| No. | Date | Tournament | Surface | Partner | Opponent | Score |
|---|---|---|---|---|---|---|
| 1. | 9 April 2001 | Estoril, Portugal | Clay | (Czech Republic) Radek Štěpánek | (United States) Donald Johnson (Serbia) Nenad Zimonjić | 6–4, 6–1 |
