= Barry Cowan (tennis) =

British tennis player

- Country (sports): (United Kingdom) Great Britain
- Residence: Lathom, England
- Born: 25 August 1974 (age 51) Southport, England
- Height: 6 ft 2 in (188 cm)
- Turned pro: 1991
- Retired: 2002
- Plays: Left-handed (one-handed backhand)
- Coach: David Sammel
- Prize money: $315,856

Singles
- Career record: 5–21
- Career titles: 0
- Highest ranking: No. 162 (11 September 2000)

Grand Slam singles results
- Australian Open: Q2 (1999, 2000)
- French Open: Q1 (1994, 2000, 2001, 2002)
- Wimbledon: 2R (2001, 2002)
- US Open: 1R (2000)

Doubles
- Career record: 11-26
- Career titles: 0
- Highest ranking: No. 136 (9 August 1999)

Grand Slam doubles results
- Wimbledon: 3R (1999)
- US Open: Q2 (1999)

Grand Slam mixed doubles results
- Wimbledon: 1R (1999, 2000, 2001, 2002)

Barry Cowan (born 25 August 1974) is a British former tennis player, best known for taking Pete Sampras to five sets at Wimbledon in 2001.

== Early years ==
Born in Southport, Merseyside, Cowan attended the LTA Rover School at Bisham Abbey. He was also a member of Aughton Tennis Club.

A left-hander, Cowan was a versatile sportsman in his junior years; he represented the North of England at under-15 level hockey and is also a member of Ormskirk Golf Club. After success in junior tournaments, Cowan first competed at the All England Club in 1994 as a wild card, losing in the first round to that year's French Open champion Sergi Bruguera in four sets.

== 2000 ==
Cowan was only to appear regularly in Grand Slams as a Wimbledon wild card. However he was successful in qualifying for the U.S. Open at Flushing Meadows in 2000, though he lost in straight sets to Jens Knippschild. Cowan later represented Britain at the Sydney Olympics taking the first set but eventually losing to Daniel Nestor in round one.

== Wimbledon 2001 ==
In 2001, Cowan received a wild card entry into Wimbledon, and won his first ever SW19 singles match against Mark Hilton in straight sets. His second round match was won by World No. 1, Pete Sampras, in five sets, Cowan winning the third and fourth.

== Davis Cup ==
In September 2001, Cowan played in his only Davis Cup singles match representing Britain in a World Group Qualifier against Ecuador, he lost in straight sets to Luis Adrijan Moreon 6–1, 6–4, although the result did not affect Britain's performance, as they beat Ecuador 4–1 overall.

== 2002 and retirement ==
In 2002 Cowan reach the second round at Wimbledon, losing in four sets to Ecuador's Nicolás Lapentti. He subsequently announced his retirement from professional tennis.

== After retirement ==
Since retiring, Cowan has commentated on tennis for Sky Sports. He is a keen supporter of Liverpool Football Club.
