= 1997 BMW Open =

- Date: 28 April – 5 May
- Edition: 81st
- Category: World Series
- Surface: Clay / outdoor
- Location: Munich, Germany
- Venue: MTTC Iphitos

Champions

Singles
- (Australia) Mark Philippoussis

Doubles
- (Argentina) Pablo Albano / (Spain) Àlex Corretja
← 1996 ·	BMW Open	· 1998 →

The 1997 BMW Open was an Association of Tennis Professionals men's tennis tournament held in Munich, Germany. The tournament was held from 28 April to 5 May 1997. Eighth-seeded Mark Philippoussis won the singles title.

== Finals ==
=== Singles ===
(Australia) Mark Philippoussis defeated (Spain) Àlex Corretja 7–6^{(7–3)}, 1–6, 6–4

- It was Philippoussis's second title of the year and the fifth of his career

=== Doubles ===
(Argentina) Pablo Albano / (Spain) Àlex Corretja defeated (Germany) Karsten Braasch / (Germany) Jens Knippschild 3–6, 7–5, 6–2

- It was Albano's first title of the year and the fifth of his career. It was Corretja's second title of the year and the fourth of his career
