= 1996 BMW Open – Singles =

Singles
- 1996 BMW Open

Final
- Champion: (Czech Republic) Ctislav Doseděl
- Runner-up: (Spain) Carlos Moyá
- Score: 6–4, 4–6, 6–3

Details
- Draw: 32
- Seeds: 8

Events
Singles	Doubles
← 1995 ·	BMW Open	· 1997 →

Wayne Ferreira was the defending champion but lost in the first round to Marc-Kevin Goellner.

Ctislav Doseděl won in the final 6–4, 4–6, 6–3 against Carlos Moyá.

== Seeds ==
1. (Austria) Thomas Muster (semifinals)
2. (Germany) Boris Becker (semifinals)
3. (Croatia) Goran Ivanišević (quarterfinals)
4. (South Africa) Wayne Ferreira (first round)
5. (United States) MaliVai Washington (first round)
6. (Austria) Gilbert Schaller (second round)
7. (Italy) Andrea Gaudenzi (first round)
8. (Australia) Mark Philippoussis (quarterfinals)

== Draw ==
=== Key ===
- Q = Qualifier
- WC = Wild card
- LL = Lucky loser
- Alt = Alternate
- ITF = ITF entry
- PR = Protected ranking
- SR = Special ranking
- SE = Special exempt
- JE = Junior exempt
- JR = Junior Accelerator Programme entrant
- CO = College Accelerator Programme entrant
- NG = Next Gen Accelerator Program entrant
- w/o = Walkover
- r = Retired
- d = Defaulted

=== Finals ===
Semifinals
1	(Austria) Thomas Muster	3	3
(Spain) Carlos Moyá	6	6
(Czech Republic) Ctislav Doseděl	7^{7}	2	7^{8}
WC/2	(Germany) Boris Becker	6^{2}	6	6^{6}

Final
(Spain) Carlos Moyá	4	6	3
(Czech Republic) Ctislav Doseděl	6	4	6

=== Top half ===
First round
1	(Austria) T Muster	6	6
(Italy) S Pescosolido	1	1
(Spain) À Corretja	0	5
(Germany) H Dreekmann	6	7
(South Africa) M Ondruska	1	2
(Czech Republic) P Korda	6	6
WC	(Germany) N Kiefer	4	5
8	(Australia) M Philippoussis	6	7
WC/3	(Croatia) G Ivanišević	6	6
(Sweden) T Johansson	1	4
Q	(Spain) R Carretero	7	6
(Germany) D Prinosil	5	4
Q	(France) G Solvès	4	3^{r}
(Spain) T Carbonell	6	4
(Spain) C Moyá	6	6
5	(United States) M Washington	3	2

Second round
1	(Austria) T Muster	4	6	7
(Germany) H Dreekmann	6	2	5
(Czech Republic) P Korda
8	(Australia) M Philippoussis	w/o
WC/3	(Croatia) G Ivanišević	6^{1}	6	6
Q	(Spain) R Carretero	7^{7}	3	4
(Spain) T Carbonell	7^{8}	2	2
(Spain) C Moyá	6^{6}	6	6

Quarterfinals
1	(Austria) T Muster	6	0	6
8	(Australia) M Philippoussis	3	6	2
WC/3	(Croatia) G Ivanišević	3	4
(Spain) C Moyá	6	6

Semifinals
1	(Austria) T Muster	3	3
(Spain) C Moyá	6	6

=== Bottom half ===
First round
6	(Austria) G Schaller	3	6	6
(Germany) C-U Steeb	6	0	4
Q	(Italy) O Camporese	1	0
(Czech Republic) C Doseděl	6	6
(Argentina) H Gumy	6	6
(Sweden) M Larsson	2	4
(Germany) M-K Goellner	6	6
4	(South Africa) W Ferreira	3	4
7	(Italy) A Gaudenzi	5	3
(Germany) B Karbacher	7	6
(Spain) A Berasategui	3	2
(Sweden) S Edberg	6	6
(Romania) A Voinea	3	5
(Spain) J Burillo	6	7
Q	(Spain) F Roig	4	4
WC/2	(Germany) B Becker	6	6

Second round
6	(Austria) G Schaller	2	5
(Czech Republic) C Doseděl	6	7
(Argentina) H Gumy	6	1	6
(Germany) M-K Goellner	2	6	3
(Germany) B Karbacher	6	6
(Sweden) S Edberg	4	2
(Spain) J Burillo	5	6	3
WC/2	(Germany) B Becker	7	4	6

Quarterfinals
(Czech Republic) C Doseděl	6	6
(Argentina) H Gumy	1	3
(Germany) B Karbacher	6^{1}	6^{3}
WC/2	(Germany) B Becker	7^{7}	7^{7}

Semifinals
(Czech Republic) C Doseděl	7^{7}	2	7^{8}
WC/2	(Germany) B Becker	6^{2}	6	6^{6}
