= 2002 BMW Open =

- Date: 29 April – 5 May
- Edition: 87th
- Category: International Series
- Draw: 32S / 16D
- Prize money: $356,000
- Surface: Clay / outdoor
- Location: Munich, Germany
- Venue: MTTC Iphitos

Champions

Singles
- (Morocco) Younes El Aynaoui

Doubles
- (Czech Republic) Petr Luxa / (Czech Republic) Radek Štěpánek
← 2001 ·	BMW Open	· 2003 →

The 2002 BMW Open was a men's tennis tournament played on outdoor clay courts in Munich, Germany and was part of the International Series of the 2002 ATP Tour. The tournament was held from 29 April until 5 May 2002. Sixth-seeded Younes El Aynaoui won the singles title.

== Finals ==
=== Singles ===
(Morocco) Younes El Aynaoui defeated (Germany) Rainer Schüttler 6–4, 6–4

- It was El Aynaoui's 3rd title of the year and the 5th of his career.

=== Doubles ===
(Czech Republic) Petr Luxa / (Czech Republic) Radek Štěpánek defeated (Czech Republic) Petr Pála / (Czech Republic) Pavel Vízner 6–0, 6–7^{(4–7)}, [11–9]

- It was Luxa's only title of the year and the 2nd of his career. It was Štěpánek's only title of the year and the 5th of his career.
