= 2009 SAP Open =

- Date: February 9–15
- Edition: 121st
- Category: International Series
- Draw: 32S / 16D
- Prize money: $531,000
- Surface: Hard / indoor
- Location: San Jose, California, U.S.
- Venue: HP Pavilion

Champions

Singles
- (Czech Republic) Radek Štěpánek

Doubles
- (Germany) Tommy Haas / (Czech Republic) Radek Štěpánek
- Pacific Coast Championships

The 2009 SAP Open was a tennis tournament played on indoor hard courts. It was the 121st edition of the SAP Open, and was part of the International Series of the 2009 ATP Tour. It took place at the HP Pavilion in San Jose, California, United States, from February 9 through February 15, 2009.

The singles draw featured ATP No. 6, 2009 Australian Open semi-finalist and 2009 Dubai finalist Andy Roddick, 2009 Australian Open quarterfinalist and 2008 U.S Open quarterfinalist Juan Martín del Potro, Other names include James Blake, Radek Štěpánek, Mardy Fish, Sam Querrey, Igor Kunitsyn and Robby Ginepri.

== Entrants ==
=== Seeds ===
Athlete	Nationality	Ranking*	Seeding
Andy Roddick	United States	6	1
Juan Martín del Potro	Argentina	7	2
James Blake	United States	11	3
Radek Štěpánek	Czech Republic	21	4
Mardy Fish	United States	24	5
Sam Querrey	United States	34	6
Igor Kunitsyn	Russia	43	7
Robby Ginepri	United States	44	8

*Rankings as of February 9, 2009.

=== Other entrants ===
The following players received wildcards into the main draw:

- (Germany) Lars Poerschke
- (Cyprus) Marcos Baghdatis
- (United States) John Isner

The following players received entry from the qualifying draw:

- (Sweden) Michael Ryderstedt
- (Germany) Dominik Meffert
- (United States) Todd Widom
- (Italy) Andrea Stoppini
- (Paraguay) Ramón Delgado (as a lucky loser, replacing Guillermo García-López)

== Finals ==
=== Singles ===
(Czech Republic) Radek Štěpánek defeated (United States) Mardy Fish, 3–6, 6–4, 6–2

- It was Štěpánek's second title of the year and 4th of his career.

=== Doubles ===
(Germany) Tommy Haas / (Czech Republic) Radek Štěpánek defeated (India) Rohan Bopanna / (Finland) Jarkko Nieminen 6–2, 6–3
