= 2001 BMW Open =

- Date: 30 April – 6 May
- Edition: 85th
- Category: International Series
- Draw: 32S / 16D
- Prize money: $375,000
- Surface: Clay / outdoor
- Location: Munich, Germany
- Venue: MTTC Iphitos

Champions

Singles
- (Czech Republic) Jiří Novák

Doubles
- (Czech Republic) Petr Luxa / (Czech Republic) Radek Štěpánek
← 2000 ·	BMW Open	· 2002 →

The 2001 BMW Open was a men's tennis tournament played on outdoor clay courts in Munich, Germany and was part of the International Series of the 2001 ATP Tour. The tournament ran from 30 April through 6 May 2001. Unseeded Jiří Novák won the singles title.

== Finals ==
=== Singles ===
(Czech Republic) Jiří Novák defeated (France) Antony Dupuis 6–4, 7–5

- It was Novák's 2nd title of the year and the 17th of his career.

=== Doubles ===
(Czech Republic) Petr Luxa / (Czech Republic) Radek Štěpánek defeated (Brazil) Jaime Oncins / (Argentina) Daniel Orsanic 5–7, 6–2, 7–6^{(7–5)}

- It was Luxa's only title of the year and the 1st of his career. It was Štěpánek's 2nd title of the year and the 3rd of his career.
