= 1998 BMW Open – Singles =

Singles
- 1998 BMW Open

Final
- Champion: (Sweden) Thomas Enqvist
- Runner-up: (United States) Andre Agassi
- Score: 6–7^{(4–7)}, 7–6^{(8–6)}, 6–3

Details
- Draw: 32
- Seeds: 8

Events
Singles	Doubles
← 1997 ·	BMW Open	· 1999 →

Mark Philippoussis was the defending champion, but lost in the second round this year.

Thomas Enqvist won the title, defeating Andre Agassi 6–7^{(4–7)}, 7–6^{(8–6)}, 6–3 in the final.

== Seeds ==
1. (United Kingdom) Greg Rusedski (first round)
2. (Sweden) Jonas Björkman (quarterfinals)
3. (Brazil) Gustavo Kuerten (second round)
4. (United Kingdom) Tim Henman (second round)
5. (Australia) Mark Philippoussis (second round)
6. (Spain) Sergi Bruguera (first round)
7. (Sweden) Thomas Enqvist (champion)
8. (United States) Andre Agassi (final)

== Draw ==
=== Key ===
- Q = Qualifier
- WC = Wild card
- LL = Lucky loser
- Alt = Alternate
- SE = Special exempt
- PR = Protected ranking
- ITF = ITF entry
- JE = Junior exempt
- w/o = Walkover
- r = Retired
- d = Defaulted
- SR = Special ranking

=== Finals ===
Semifinals
7	(Sweden) Thomas Enqvist	6	6
(Sweden) Magnus Gustafsson	3	4
(Spain) Galo Blanco	4	4
8	(United States) Andre Agassi	6	6

Final
7	(Sweden) Thomas Enqvist	6^{4}	7^{8}	6
8	(United States) Andre Agassi	7^{7}	6^{6}	3

=== Top half ===
First round
1	(United Kingdom) G Rusedski	4	0
(Germany) O Gross	6	6
Q	(Italy) M Martelli	6	6^{13}	5
Q	(Spain) J Imaz-Ruiz	4	7^{15}	7
(Germany) T Haas	3	7^{7}	4
(Switzerland) M Rosset	6	6^{2}	6
(Sweden) M Norman	5	3
7	(Sweden) T Enqvist	7	6
3	(Brazil) G Kuerten	6	7^{8}
WC	(Croatia) G Ivanišević	4	6^{6}
Q	(France) S Grosjean	3	1
(Sweden) M Gustafsson	6	6
(France) N Escudé	4	6	6
(Slovakia) D Hrbatý	6	3	1
(Spain) J Alonso	5	4
5	(Australia) M Philippoussis	7	6

Second round
(Germany) O Gross	6	6
Q	(Spain) J Imaz-Ruiz	1	0
(Switzerland) M Rosset	2	3
7	(Sweden) T Enqvist	6	6
3	(Brazil) G Kuerten	6^{2}	3
(Sweden) M Gustafsson	7^{7}	6
(France) N Escudé	6	7^{7}
5	(Australia) M Philippoussis	4	6^{4}

Quarterfinals
(Germany) O Gross	3	3
7	(Sweden) T Enqvist	6	6
(Sweden) M Gustafsson	6	6
(France) N Escudé	3	1

Semifinals
7	(Sweden) T Enqvist	6	6
(Sweden) M Gustafsson	3	4

=== Bottom half ===
First round
WC/6	(Spain) S Bruguera	1	6^{3}
(Spain) G Blanco	6	7^{7}
(Germany) A Rădulescu	6^{5}	4
LL	(Austria) G Mandl	7^{7}	6
(Sweden) T Nydahl	7	2	6
LL	(Germany) C Vinck	5	6	3
WC	(Germany) J Knippschild	4	6	1
4	(United Kingdom) T Henman	6	4	6
8	(United States) A Agassi	6	3	6
(Australia) T Woodbridge	1	6	3
(Australia) M Woodforde	4	6^{2}
(Germany) R Schüttler	6	7^{7}
Q	(Belgium) C van Garsse	7	6
(New Zealand) B Steven	5	1
(Ukraine) A Medvedev	6	4	0
2	(Sweden) J Björkman	2	6	6

Second round
(Spain) G Blanco	6	6
LL	(Austria) G Mandl	4	2
(Sweden) T Nydahl	6	6
4	(United Kingdom) T Henman	3	1
8	(United States) A Agassi	6	6
(Germany) R Schüttler	1	4
Q	(Belgium) C van Garsse	4	0	r
2	(Sweden) J Björkman	6	2

Quarterfinals
(Spain) G Blanco	7	5	7^{7}
(Sweden) T Nydahl	5	7	6^{1}
8	(United States) A Agassi	6	6
2	(Sweden) J Björkman	2	2

Semifinals
(Spain) G Blanco	4	4
8	(United States) A Agassi	6	6
