= 1996 BMW Open – Doubles =

Doubles
- 1996 BMW Open

Final
- Champions: (South Africa) Lan Bale (Netherlands) Stephen Noteboom
- Runners-up: (France) Olivier Delaître (Italy) Diego Nargiso
- Score: 4–6, 7–6, 6–4

Details
- Draw: 16
- Seeds: 4

Events
Singles	Doubles
← 1995 ·	BMW Open	· 1997 →

Trevor Kronemann and David Macpherson were the defending champions but only Kronemann competed that year with John-Laffnie de Jager.

de Jager and Kronemann lost in the quarterfinals to Lan Bale and Stephen Noteboom.

Bale and Noteboom won in the final 4–6, 7–6, 6–4 against Olivier Delaître and Diego Nargiso.

== Seeds ==
1. (Spain) Tomás Carbonell / (Spain) Francisco Roig (quarterfinals)
2. (Sweden) Stefan Edberg / (Czech Republic) Petr Korda (quarterfinals)
3. (South Africa) Piet Norval / (Netherlands) Menno Oosting (first round)
4. (South Africa) John-Laffnie de Jager / (United States) Trevor Kronemann (quarterfinals)

== Draw ==
=== Key ===
- Q = Qualifier
- WC = Wild card
- LL = Lucky loser
- Alt = Alternate
- ITF = ITF entry
- PR = Protected ranking
- SR = Special ranking
- SE = Special exempt
- JE = Junior exempt
- JR = Junior Accelerator Programme entrant
- CO = College Accelerator Programme entrant
- NG = Next Gen Accelerator Program entrant
- w/o = Walkover
- r = Retired
- d = Defaulted

First round
1	(Spain) T Carbonell (Spain) F Roig	6	6	6
WC	(Australia) M Philippoussis (Germany) C-U Steeb	3	7	0
(Italy) A Gaudenzi (Croatia) G Ivanišević	6	3	6
Q	(Italy) O Camporese (Italy) S Pescosolido	2	6	4
4	(South Africa) J-L de Jager (United States) T Kronemann	6	6
(South Africa) D Adams (South Africa) M Barnard	2	2
(South Africa) L Bale (Netherlands) S Noteboom	6	6
(South Africa) W Ferreira (South Africa) M Ondruska	4	3
WC	(Germany) D Elsner (Sweden) T Nydahl	1	3
(Netherlands) T Nijssen (United States) G Van Emburgh	6	6
(Germany) M-K Goellner (Germany) D Prinosil	6	2	6
3	(South Africa) P Norval (Netherlands) M Oosting	1	6	3
(France) O Delaître (Italy) D Nargiso	6	6	6
WC	(Germany) H Dreekmann (Germany) P Kühnen	4	7	1
(Australia) J Eagle (Australia) A Florent	1	3
2	(Sweden) S Edberg (Czech Republic) P Korda	6	6

Quarterfinals
1	(Spain) T Carbonell (Spain) F Roig	4	2
(Italy) A Gaudenzi (Croatia) G Ivanišević	6	6
4	(South Africa) J-L de Jager (United States) T Kronemann	4	4
(South Africa) L Bale (Netherlands) S Noteboom	6	6
(Netherlands) T Nijssen (United States) G Van Emburgh	4	6
(Germany) M-K Goellner (Germany) D Prinosil	6	7
(France) O Delaître (Italy) D Nargiso	w/o
2	(Sweden) S Edberg (Czech Republic) P Korda

Semifinals
(Italy) A Gaudenzi (Croatia) G Ivanišević	6	3	2
(South Africa) L Bale (Netherlands) S Noteboom	4	6	6
(Germany) M-K Goellner (Germany) D Prinosil	1	2
(France) O Delaître (Italy) D Nargiso	6	6

Final
(South Africa) L Bale (Netherlands) S Noteboom	4	7	6
(France) O Delaître (Italy) D Nargiso	6	6	4
