= 1995 BMW Open =

- Date: 1–8 May
- Edition: 79th
- Category: World Series
- Draw: 32S / 16D
- Prize money: $400,000
- Surface: Clay / outdoor
- Location: Munich, Germany
- Venue: MTTC Iphitos

Champions

Singles
- (South Africa) Wayne Ferreira

Doubles
- (United States) Trevor Kronemann / (Australia) David Macpherson
← 1994 ·	BMW Open	· 1996 →

The 1995 BMW Open was a men's Association of Tennis Professionals tennis tournament held in Munich, Germany and played on outdoor clay courts. The event was part of the World Series of the 1995 ATP Tour. It was the 79th edition of the tournament and was held from 1 May through 8 May 1995. Wayne Ferreira won the singles title.

== Finals ==
=== Singles ===
(South Africa) Wayne Ferreira defeated (Germany) Michael Stich 7–5, 7–6^{(8–6)}

- It was Ferreira's 2nd title of the year and the 13th of his career.

=== Doubles ===
(United States) Trevor Kronemann / (Australia) David Macpherson defeated (Argentina) Luis Lobo / (Spain) Javier Sánchez 6–3, 6–4

- It was Kronemann's 3rd title of the year and the 5th of his career. It was Macpherson's 3rd title of the year and the 11th of his career.
