= 1999 BMW Open – Singles =

Singles
- 1999 BMW Open

Final
- Champion: (Argentina) Franco Squillari
- Runner-up: (Romania) Andrei Pavel
- Score: 6–4, 6–3

Details
- Draw: 32
- Seeds: 8

Events
Singles	Doubles
← 1998 ·	BMW Open	· 2000 →

The 1999 BMW Open was a men's tennis tournament played on Clay courts in Munich, Germany that was part of the World Series of the 1999 ATP Tour. It was the eighty-third edition of the tournament and was held from April 26 – May 3.

Thomas Enqvist was the defending champion, but lost in the first round this year.

Franco Squillari won the title, defeating Andrei Pavel 6–4, 6–3 in the final.

== Seeds ==
1. (Slovakia) Karol Kučera (withdrew)
2. (Sweden) Thomas Enqvist (first round)
3. (Brazil) Gustavo Kuerten (first round)
4. (Germany) Tommy Haas (second round)
5. (South Africa) Wayne Ferreira (second round)
6. (Switzerland) Marc Rosset (first round)
7. (Netherlands) Jan Siemerink (first round)
8. (Argentina) Mariano Puerta (first round)

== Draw ==
=== Key ===
- Q = Qualifier
- WC = Wild card
- LL = Lucky loser
- Alt = Alternate
- ITF = ITF entry
- PR = Protected ranking
- SR = Special ranking
- SE = Special exempt
- JE = Junior exempt
- JR = Junior Accelerator Programme entrant
- CO = College Accelerator Programme entrant
- NG = Next Gen Accelerator Program entrant
- w/o = Walkover
- r = Retired
- d = Defaulted

=== Finals ===
Semifinals
(Argentina) Mariano Zabaleta	6	1	2
(Argentina) Franco Squillari	4	6	6
(Spain) Alberto Berasategui	5	4
(Romania) Andrei Pavel	7	6

Final
(Argentina) Franco Squillari	6	6
(Romania) Andrei Pavel	4	3

=== Top half ===
First round
LL	(Germany) C Vinck	6	3	7
(Paraguay) R Delgado	4	6	5
(Argentina) M Zabaleta	6	6
(Spain) A Portas	3	4
Q	(France) G Solvès	6	3	2
WC	(Germany) L Burgsmüller	3	6	6
(Germany) O Gross	7^{7}	7
8	(Argentina) M Puerta	6^{5}	5
4	(Germany) T Haas	4	7^{7}	6
(Spain) Á Calatrava	6	6^{2}	4
(Argentina) F Squillari	6	6
Q	(Italy) D Scala	2	2
WC	(Germany) M Kohlmann	7	6
(Netherlands) J van Lottum	5	4
(Germany) B Becker	6	3	4
5	(South Africa) W Ferreira	3	6	6

Second round
LL	(Germany) C Vinck	4	4
(Argentina) M Zabaleta	6	6
WC	(Germany) L Burgsmüller	6	6
(Germany) O Gross	1	3
4	(Germany) T Haas	2	7^{7}	1
(Argentina) F Squillari	6	6^{1}	6
WC	(Germany) M Kohlmann	6^{4}	6	7
5	(South Africa) W Ferreira	7^{7}	4	5

Quarterfinals
(Argentina) M Zabaleta	6	6
WC	(Germany) L Burgsmüller	2	1
(Argentina) F Squillari	6	6
WC	(Germany) M Kohlmann	2	2

Semifinals
(Argentina) M Zabaleta	6	1	2
(Argentina) F Squillari	4	6	6

=== Bottom half ===
First round
6	(Switzerland) M Rosset	6	3	1
(Spain) A Berasategui	2	6	6
(Germany) R Schüttler	6^{2}	4
(Germany) B Karbacher	7^{7}	6
(Italy) A Gaudenzi	4	2
(Romania) A Voinea	6	6
(Italy) V Santopadre	6	6
WC/3	(Brazil) G Kuerten	3	2
7	(Netherlands) J Siemerink	4	4
(France) A Clément	6	6
Q	(Croatia) I Ljubičić	6	4	4
(Germany) H Dreekmann	6	4	4
(Romania) A Pavel	6	6
Q	(Russia) I Kornienko	4	0
(Romania) D Pescariu	6	3	6
2	(Sweden) T Enqvist	3	6	3

Second round
(Spain) A Berasategui	6	7^{7}
(Germany) B Karbacher	4	6^{3}
(Romania) A Voinea	6^{2}	5
(Italy) V Santopadre	7^{7}	7
(France) A Clément	6	2	1
(Germany) H Dreekmann	3	6	6
(Romania) A Pavel	6^{3}	6	6
(Romania) D Pescariu	7^{7}	0	3

Quarterfinals
(Spain) A Berasategui	7^{8}	6
(Italy) V Santopadre	6^{6}	2
(Germany) H Dreekmann	1	4
(Romania) A Pavel	6	6

Semifinals
(Spain) A Berasategui	5	4
(Romania) A Pavel	7	6
