= 1998 BMW Open – Doubles =

Doubles
- 1998 BMW Open

Final
- Champions: (Australia) Todd Woodbridge (Australia) Mark Woodforde
- Runners-up: (Australia) Joshua Eagle (Australia) Andrew Florent
- Score: 6–0, 6–3

Events
Singles	Doubles
← 1997 ·	BMW Open	· 1999 →

Pablo Albano and Àlex Corretja were the defending champions, but Corretja did not participate this year. Albano partnered Jonas Björkman, losing in the semifinals.

Todd Woodbridge and Mark Woodforde won the title, defeating Joshua Eagle and Andrew Florent 6–0, 6–3 in the final.

== Seeds ==
1. (Australia) Todd Woodbridge / (Australia) Mark Woodforde (champions)
2. (Australia) Joshua Eagle / (Australia) Andrew Florent (final)
3. (Argentina) Pablo Albano / (Sweden) Jonas Björkman (semifinals)
4. (South Africa) David Adams / (New Zealand) Brett Steven (quarterfinals)

== Draw ==
=== Key ===
- Q = Qualifier
- WC = Wild card
- LL = Lucky loser
- Alt = Alternate
- SE = Special exempt
- PR = Protected ranking
- ITF = ITF entry
- JE = Junior exempt
- w/o = Walkover
- r = Retired
- d = Defaulted
- SR = Special ranking

=== Draw ===
First round
1	(Australia) T Woodbridge (Australia) M Woodforde	6	6
(South Africa) J-L de Jager (South Africa) R Koenig	4	4
(South Africa) M Barnard (Italy) F Messori	6	6
(United Kingdom) T Henman (Switzerland) M Rosset	3	3
3	(Argentina) P Albano (Sweden) J Björkman	7	7
(Spain) J Alonso (Hungary) G Köves	6	5
(North Macedonia) A Kitinov (Russia) A Olhovskiy	5	6	5
(Brazil) N Aerts (Brazil) G Kuerten	7	0	7
WC	(Germany) A Rădulescu (Germany) R Schüttler	6	5
WC	(Croatia) S Hiršzon (Croatia) G Ivanišević	7	7
WC	(Germany) N Kiefer (Germany) J Knippschild	6	5	2
4	(South Africa) D Adams (New Zealand) B Steven	4	7	6
(Netherlands) T Kempers (Netherlands) M Oosting	6	5	6
Q	(Argentina) G Etlis (Brazil) J Oncins	4	7	3
(Italy) M Ardinghi (Netherlands) S Groen	3	4
2	(Australia) J Eagle (Australia) A Florent	6	6

Quarterfinals
1	(Australia) T Woodbridge (Australia) M Woodforde	6	6
(South Africa) M Barnard (Italy) F Messori	4	3
3	(Argentina) P Albano (Sweden) J Björkman	7	3	6
(Brazil) N Aerts (Brazil) G Kuerten	6	6	3
WC	(Croatia) S Hiršzon (Croatia) G Ivanišević	6	5	6
4	(South Africa) D Adams (New Zealand) B Steven	4	7	3
(Netherlands) T Kempers (Netherlands) M Oosting	5	6
2	(Australia) J Eagle (Australia) A Florent	7	7

Semifinals
1	(Australia) T Woodbridge (Australia) M Woodforde	7	6
3	(Argentina) P Albano (Sweden) J Björkman	6	1
WC	(Croatia) S Hiršzon (Croatia) G Ivanišević	6	2
2	(Australia) J Eagle (Australia) A Florent	7	6

Final
1	(Australia) T Woodbridge (Australia) M Woodforde	6	6
2	(Australia) J Eagle (Australia) A Florent	0	3
