= 2002 BMW Open – Singles =

Singles
- 2002 BMW Open

Final
- Champion: (Morocco) Younes El Aynaoui
- Runner-up: (Germany) Rainer Schüttler
- Score: 6–4, 6–4

Details
- Draw: 32 (4 Q / 3 WC )
- Seeds: 8

Events
Singles	Doubles
- BMW Open

Jiří Novák was the defending champion but lost in the second round to Julien Boutter.

Younes El Aynaoui won in the final 6–4, 6–4 against Rainer Schüttler.

== Seeds ==
1. (Russia) Yevgeny Kafelnikov (first round)
2. (Germany) Tommy Haas (quarterfinals, retired because of a back muscle strain)
3. (Sweden) Thomas Johansson (first round)
4. (Czech Republic) Jiří Novák (second round)
5. (Argentina) ~~Guillermo Cañas~~ (withdrew because of a quadriceps muscle strain)
6. (Morocco) Younes El Aynaoui (champion)
7. (Ecuador) Nicolás Lapentti (quarterfinals)
8. (France) Fabrice Santoro (first round)

== Draw ==
Key

- Q = Qualifier
- WC = Wild card
- LL = Lucky loser
- Alt = Alternate
- ITF = ITF entry
- PR = Protected ranking
- SR = Special ranking
- SE = Special exempt
- JE = Junior exempt
- JR = Junior Accelerator Programme entrant
- CO = College Accelerator Programme entrant
- NG = Next Gen Accelerator Program entrant
- w/o = Walkover
- r = Retired
- d = Defaulted

=== Finals ===
Semifinals
Q	(Czech Republic) Radek Štěpánek	4	3
(Germany) Rainer Schüttler	6	6
6	(Morocco) Younes El Aynaoui	4	7	7^{7}
(Russia) Mikhail Youzhny	6	5	6^{3}

Final
(Germany) Rainer Schüttler	4	4
6	(Morocco) Younes El Aynaoui	6	6

=== Top half ===
First round
1	(Russia) Y Kafelnikov	4	7^{9}	3
(Germany) N Kiefer	6	6^{7}	6
Q	(Czech Republic) R Štěpánek	6	6
Q	(Netherlands) D van Scheppingen	3	0
(Brazil) F Meligeni	2	6	6
Q	(Croatia) Ž Krajan	6	1	0
WC	(Germany) P Kohlschreiber	6	4	5
7	(Ecuador) N Lapentti	4	6	7
3	(Sweden) T Johansson	5	3
(Germany) R Schüttler	7	6
WC	(Germany) B Phau	4	3
WC	(Germany) A Popp	6	6
(Argentina) F Squillari	7^{7}	3	4
(Argentina) J I Chela	6^{5}	6	6
(Spain) F Clavet	7^{9}	2	6
8	(France) F Santoro	6^{7}	6	4

Second round
(Germany) N Kiefer	2	2
Q	(Czech Republic) R Štěpánek	6	6
(Brazil) F Meligeni	4	4
7	(Ecuador) N Lapentti	6	6
(Germany) R Schüttler	6	6
WC	(Germany) A Popp	3	2
(Argentina) J I Chela	6^{5}	6	3
(Spain) F Clavet	7^{7}	4	6

Quarterfinals
Q	(Czech Republic) R Štěpánek	7^{7}	6
7	(Ecuador) N Lapentti	6^{5}	2
(Germany) R Schüttler	4	6	6
(Spain) F Clavet	6	4	1

Semifinals
Q	(Czech Republic) R Štěpánek	4	3
(Germany) R Schüttler	6	6

=== Bottom half ===
First round
6	(Morocco) Y El Aynaoui	6	6
(Belarus) M Mirnyi	4	4
(Germany) L Burgsmüller	3	3
(Czech Republic) B Ulihrach	6	6
(Australia) M Philippoussis	5	6^{4}
(France) J Boutter	7	7^{7}
Q	(Norway) J F Andersen	6	1	4
4	(Czech Republic) J Novák	4	6	6
LL	(Germany) O Gross	4	7	6
LL	(Netherlands) R Sluiter	6	5	1
(Russia) M Youzhny	6	1	6
(Morocco) H Arazi	2	6	1
(Romania) A Pavel	6	6
(Italy) A Gaudenzi	3	4
(Argentina) D Nalbandian	5	6	1
2	(Germany) T Haas	7	4	6

Second round
6	(Morocco) Y El Aynaoui	6	4	6
(Czech Republic) B Ulihrach	4	6	4
(France) J Boutter	6	7
4	(Czech Republic) J Novák	2	5
LL	(Germany) O Gross	6^{4}	6^{2}
(Russia) M Youzhny	7^{7}	7^{7}
(Romania) A Pavel	7	6^{2}	2
2	(Germany) T Haas	5	7^{7}	6

Quarterfinals
6	(Morocco) Y El Aynaoui	6	7
(France) J Boutter	4	5
(Russia) M Youzhny	6	2
2	(Germany) T Haas	2	0^{r}

Semifinals
6	(Morocco) Y El Aynaoui	4	7	7^{7}
(Russia) M Youzhny	6	5	6^{3}
