= 1995 BMW Open – Doubles =

Doubles
- 1995 BMW Open

Final
- Champions: (United States) Trevor Kronemann (Australia) David Macpherson
- Runners-up: (Argentina) Luis Lobo (Spain) Javier Sánchez
- Score: 6–3, 6–4

Details
- Draw: 16
- Seeds: 4

Events
Singles	Doubles
← 1994 ·	BMW Open	· 1996 →

Yevgeny Kafelnikov and David Rikl were the defending champions, but did not participate this year.

Trevor Kronemann and David Macpherson won the title, defeating Luis Lobo and Javier Sánchez 6–3, 6–4 in the final.

== Seeds ==
1. (Canada) Grant Connell / (United States) Patrick Galbraith (first round)
2. (United States) Trevor Kronemann / (Australia) David Macpherson (champions)
3. (Czech Republic) Cyril Suk / (Czech Republic) Daniel Vacek (first round)
4. (South Africa) Gary Muller / (South Africa) Piet Norval (first round)

== Draw ==
=== Key ===
- Q = Qualifier
- WC = Wild card
- LL = Lucky loser
- Alt = Alternate
- SE = Special exempt
- PR = Protected ranking
- ITF = ITF entry
- JE = Junior exempt
- w/o = Walkover
- r = Retired
- d = Defaulted
- SR = Special ranking

=== Draw ===
First round
1	(Canada) G Connell (United States) P Galbraith	3	6
(Sweden) S Edberg (Italy) D Nargiso	6	7
(Argentina) L Lobo (Spain) J Sánchez	6	4	6
(United States) M Bauer (United States) S Melville	4	6	3
3	(Czech Republic) C Suk (Czech Republic) D Vacek	6	1	4
WC	(Germany) B Becker (Germany) U Riglewski	2	6	6
(Czech Republic) V Flégl (Australia) J Ireland	6	3	3
(South Africa) W Ferreira (South Africa) M Ondruska	4	6	6
(Germany) M Sinner (Germany) M Stich	7	3	5
(South Africa) L Bale (South Africa) J-L de Jager	6	6	7
(Czech Republic) P Korda (Czech Republic) K Nováček	7	6
4	(South Africa) G Muller (South Africa) P Norval	5	4
WC	(Germany) B Karbacher (Germany) D Prinosil	6	3	4
Q	(Australia) M Philippoussis (Australia) P Rafter	1	6	6
WC	(Germany) C-U Steeb (Germany) M Zoecke	2	5
2	(United States) T Kronemann (Australia) D Macpherson	6	7

Quarterfinals
(Sweden) S Edberg (Italy) D Nargiso	3	3
(Argentina) L Lobo (Spain) J Sánchez	6	6
WC	(Germany) B Becker (Germany) U Riglewski	7	7
(South Africa) W Ferreira (South Africa) M Ondruska	5	6
(South Africa) L Bale (South Africa) J-L de Jager	7	7
(Czech Republic) P Korda (Czech Republic) K Nováček	6	6
Q	(Australia) M Philippoussis (Australia) P Rafter	7	4	4
2	(United States) T Kronemann (Australia) D Macpherson	5	6	6

Semifinals
(Argentina) L Lobo (Spain) J Sánchez	3	7	6
WC	(Germany) B Becker (Germany) U Riglewski	6	6	4
(South Africa) L Bale (South Africa) J-L de Jager	3	3
2	(United States) T Kronemann (Australia) D Macpherson	6	6

Final
(Argentina) L Lobo (Spain) J Sánchez	3	4
2	(United States) T Kronemann (Australia) D Macpherson	6	6
