= 2001 BMW Open – Doubles =

Doubles
- 2001 BMW Open

Final
- Champions: (Czech Republic) Petr Luxa (Czech Republic) Radek Štěpánek
- Runners-up: (Brazil) Jaime Oncins (Argentina) Daniel Orsanic
- Score: 5–7, 6–2, 7–6^{(7–5)}

Events
Singles	Doubles
← 2000 ·	BMW Open	· 2002 →

David Adams and John-Laffnie de Jager were the defending champions but they competed with different partners that year, Adams with Andrei Olhovskiy and de Jager with Jason Weir-Smith.

Adams and Olhovskiy lost in the first round to de Jager and Weir-Smith.

de Jager and Weir-Smith lost in the semifinals to Petr Luxa and Radek Štěpánek.

Luxa and Štěpánek won in the final 5–7, 6–2, 7–6^{(7–5)} against Jaime Oncins and Daniel Orsanic.

== Seeds ==
1. (Australia) Wayne Arthurs / (Australia) Sandon Stolle (quarterfinals)
2. (Czech Republic) David Rikl / (Czech Republic) Cyril Suk (quarterfinals)
3. (Brazil) Jaime Oncins / (Argentina) Daniel Orsanic (final)
4. (South Africa) David Adams / (Russia) Andrei Olhovskiy (first round)

== Draw ==
=== Key ===
- Q = Qualifier
- WC = Wild card
- LL = Lucky loser
- Alt = Alternate
- SE = Special exempt
- PR = Protected ranking
- ITF = ITF entry
- JE = Junior exempt
- w/o = Walkover
- r = Retired
- d = Defaulted
- SR = Special ranking

First round
1	(Australia) W Arthurs (Australia) S Stolle	6	6
(Czech Republic) T Cibulec (Czech Republic) L Friedl	2	3
(Czech Republic) P Pála (Czech Republic) P Vízner	6	3	6
WC	(Ecuador) N Lapentti (Chile) M Ríos	3	6	4
3	(Brazil) J Oncins (Argentina) D Orsanic	7^{7}	6
(South Africa) R Koenig (South Africa) M Wakefield	6^{3}	2
(Australia) J Eagle (Australia) P Hanley	6	6
WC	(Germany) M Kohlmann (Germany) R Schüttler	2	2
(France) J Boutter (France) F Santoro	4	7^{9}	5
(Argentina) G Etlis (Argentina) M Rodríguez	6	6^{7}	7
(South Africa) J-L de Jager (South Africa) J Weir-Smith	7^{7}	7
4	(South Africa) D Adams (Russia) A Olhovskiy	6^{5}	5
WC	(Sweden) T Enqvist (Sweden) T Johansson	6	2	3
Q	(Czech Republic) P Luxa (Czech Republic) R Štěpánek	3	6	6
(Australia) A Florent (Australia) N Healey	6^{3}	3
2	(Czech Republic) D Rikl (Czech Republic) C Suk	7^{7}	6

Quarterfinals
1	(Australia) W Arthurs (Australia) S Stolle	4	4
(Czech Republic) P Pála (Czech Republic) P Vízner	6	6
3	(Brazil) J Oncins (Argentina) D Orsanic	6	2	6
(Australia) J Eagle (Australia) P Hanley	4	6	1
(Argentina) G Etlis (Argentina) M Rodríguez	6	3	5
(South Africa) J-L de Jager (South Africa) J Weir-Smith	1	6	7
Q	(Czech Republic) P Luxa (Czech Republic) R Štěpánek	7^{7}	6
2	(Czech Republic) D Rikl (Czech Republic) C Suk	6^{5}	3

Semifinals
(Czech Republic) P Pála (Czech Republic) P Vízner	1	5
3	(Brazil) J Oncins (Argentina) D Orsanic	6	7
(South Africa) J-L de Jager (South Africa) J Weir-Smith	7	2	r
Q	(Czech Republic) P Luxa (Czech Republic) R Štěpánek	5	4

Final
3	(Brazil) J Oncins (Argentina) D Orsanic	7	2	6^{5}
Q	(Czech Republic) P Luxa (Czech Republic) R Štěpánek	5	6	7^{7}
