= 2006 Hamburg Masters – Singles =

Singles
- 2006 Hamburg Masters

Final
- Champion: (Spain) Tommy Robredo
- Runner-up: (Czech Republic) Radek Štěpánek
- Score: 6–1, 6–3, 6–3

Details
- Draw: 64
- Seeds: 16

Events
Singles	Doubles
← 2005 ·	Hamburg Masters	· 2007 →

Tommy Robredo defeated Radek Štěpánek in the final, 6–1, 6–3, 6–3 to win the singles tennis title at the 2006 Hamburg Masters.

Roger Federer was the two-time reigning champion, but withdrew due to fatigue.

== Seeds ==
A champion seed is indicated in bold text while text in italics indicates the round in which that seed was eliminated.

1. (Switzerland) ~~Roger Federer~~ (withdrew due to fatigue)
2. (Spain) ~~Rafael Nadal~~ (withdrew due to fatigue)
3. (Croatia) Ivan Ljubičić (second round)
4. (Russia) Nikolay Davydenko (quarterfinals)
5. (United States) James Blake (third round)
6. (Argentina) Gastón Gaudio (second round)
7. (Chile) Fernando González (third round)
8. (Spain) **Tommy Robredo (champion)**
9. (Germany) Nicolas Kiefer (second round)
10. (Argentina) Guillermo Coria (first round)
11. (Sweden) Thomas Johansson (first round)
12. (Croatia) Mario Ančić (semifinals)
13. (Finland) Jarkko Nieminen (third round)
14. (United States) Robby Ginepri (first round)
15. (Czech Republic) Radek Štěpánek (final)
16. (Spain) David Ferrer (quarterfinals)

== Draw ==
=== Key ===
- Q = Qualifier
- WC = Wild card
- LL = Lucky loser
- Alt = Alternate
- SE = Special exempt
- PR = Protected ranking
- ITF = ITF entry
- JE = Junior exempt
- w/o = Walkover
- r = Retired
- d = Defaulted
- SR = Special ranking

=== Finals ===
Semifinals
8	(Spain) **Tommy Robredo**	**7**	**6**
12	(Croatia) Mario Ančić	5	4
(Argentina) José Acasuso	4	6^{5}
15	(Czech Republic) **Radek Štěpánek**	**6**	**7^{7}**

Final
8	(Spain) **Tommy Robredo**	**6**	**6**	**6**
15	(Czech Republic) Radek Štěpánek	1	3	3

=== Top half ===
==== Section 1 ====
First round
LL	(Czech Republic) L Dlouhý	**6**	3	2
WC	(Germany) **R Schüttler**	4	**6**	**6**
(Belgium) O Rochus	6^{4}	**7**	3
(Spain) **J C Ferrero**	**7^{7}**	5	**6**
(Russia) M Safin	**7**	0	4
Q	(Brazil) **F Saretta**	5	**6**	**6**
(Spain) F López	4	2
16	(Spain) **D Ferrer**	**6**	**6**
11	(Sweden) T Johansson	3	4
(France) **P-H Mathieu**	**6**	**6**
(France) R Gasquet	4	2
(Belgium) **K Vliegen**	**6**	**6**
(Czech Republic) T Berdych	4	**6**	5
(France) **F Serra**	**6**	0	**7**
(Czech Republic) J Novák	3	2
8	(Spain) **T Robredo**	**6**	**6**

Second round
WC	(Germany) R Schüttler	3	**6**	2
(Spain) **J C Ferrero**	**6**	3	**6**
Q	(Brazil) F Saretta	1	6^{9}
16	(Spain) **D Ferrer**	**6**	**7^{11}**
(France) **P-H Mathieu**	**6**	**6**
(Belgium) K Vliegen	2	4
(France) F Serra	**6**	3	2
8	(Spain) **T Robredo**	3	**6**	**6**

Third round
(Spain) J C Ferrero	2	4
16	(Spain) **D Ferrer**	**6**	**6**
(France) P-H Mathieu	3	3
8	(Spain) **T Robredo**	**6**	**6**

Quarterfinals
16	(Spain) D Ferrer	6^{8}	4
8	(Spain) **T Robredo**	**7^{10}**	**6**

==== Section 2 ====
First round
4	(Russia) **N Davydenko**	**6**	**6**
(Chile) N Massú	3	4
(Switzerland) S Wawrinka	**6**	6^{4}	1
(Italy) **A Seppi**	2	**7^{7}**	**6**
(Thailand) P Srichaphan	5	1
(Belgium) **C Rochus**	**7**	**6**
(Italy) D Sanguinetti	**7**	1	4
13	(Finland) **J Nieminen**	5	**6**	**6**
12	(Croatia) **M Ančić**	**6**	**7**
Q	(Germany) A Waske	2	5
Q	(Spain) **G García-López**	**6**	**6**
(Russia) M Youzhny	0	4
(France) G Monfils	4	1
(United Kingdom) **A Murray**	**6**	**6**
(Spain) C Moyà	3	**6**	5
5	(United States) **J Blake**	**6**	3	**7**

Second round
4	(Russia) **N Davydenko**	**6**	**6**
(Italy) A Seppi	1	2
(Belgium) C Rochus	1	0
13	(Finland) **J Nieminen**	**6**	**6**
12	(Croatia) **M Ančić**	3	**6**	**6**
Q	(Spain) G García-López	**6**	4	0
(United Kingdom) A Murray	3	3
5	(United States) **J Blake**	**6**	**6**

Third round
4	(Russia) **N Davydenko**	**6**	**6**
13	(Finland) J Nieminen	1	3
12	(Croatia) **M Ančić**	4	**7**	**7^{7}**
5	(United States) J Blake	**6**	5	6^{3}

Quarterfinals
4	(Russia) N Davydenko	**7**	6^{4}	3
12	(Croatia) **M Ančić**	5	**7^{7}**	**6**

=== Bottom half ===
==== Section 3 ====
First round
7	(Chile) **F González**	**6**	**6**
(Russia) D Tursunov	4	3
(Slovakia) **D Hrbatý**	**6**	**6**
WC	(Germany) F Mayer	4	2
(Argentina) J I Chela	**6**	4	2
(Spain) **F Verdasco**	1	**6**	**6**
Q	(Serbia and Montenegro) **N Djokovic**	**6**	3	**6**
10	(Argentina) G Coria	3	**6**	3
14	(United States) R Ginepri	5	5
(France) **S Grosjean**	**7**	**7**
(Italy) **F Volandri**	**6**	**6**
(Serbia and Montenegro) B Pašanski	2	2
(Argentina) **J Acasuso**	**6**	**6**
WC	(Germany) S Greul	2	1
Q	(Germany) P Kohlschreiber	**7^{7}**	3	3
3	(Croatia) **I Ljubičić**	6^{3}	**6**	**6**

Second round
7	(Chile) **F González**	6^{4}	**6**	**6**
(Slovakia) D Hrbatý	**7^{7}**	1	3
(Spain) **F Verdasco**	**6**	**6**
Q	(Serbia and Montenegro) N Djokovic	4	3
(France) **S Grosjean**	**7**	**7^{7}**
(Italy) F Volandri	5	6^{4}
(Argentina) **J Acasuso**	**6**	**6**
3	(Croatia) I Ljubičić	2	0

Third round
7	(Chile) F González	**6**	2	3
(Spain) **F Verdasco**	3	**6**	**6**
(France) S Grosjean	5	4
(Argentina) **J Acasuso**	**7**	**6**

Quarterfinals
(Spain) F Verdasco	1	**7^{8}**	3
(Argentina) **J Acasuso**	**6**	6^{6}	**6**

==== Section 4 ====
First round
6	(Argentina) **G Gaudio**	**6**	3	**6**
(Spain) A Martín	2	**6**	4
(United Kingdom) G Rusedski	1	1
Q	(France) **G Simon**	**6**	**6**
(Peru) L Horna	6^{5}	5
(Belarus) **M Mirnyi**	**7^{7}**	**7**
Q	(Austria) J Melzer	2	**6**	3
9	(Germany) **N Kiefer**	**6**	3	**6**
15	(Czech Republic) **R Štěpánek**	**6**	3
(Cyprus) M Baghdatis	3	1^{r}
(France) F Santoro	**6**	1	4
WC	(Germany) **B Phau**	3	**6**	**6**
(Belgium) X Malisse	3	0^{r}
Q	(Argentina) **J Mónaco**	**6**	2
(Germany) T Haas	2	1^{r}
LL	(Sweden) **R Söderling**	**6**	2

Second round
6	(Argentina) G Gaudio	4	**6**	4
Q	(France) **G Simon**	**6**	3	**6**
(Belarus) **M Mirnyi**	**6**	**6**
9	(Germany) N Kiefer	2	2
15	(Czech Republic) **R Štěpánek**	**6**	**6**
WC	(Germany) B Phau	4	3
Q	(Argentina) J Mónaco	4	4
LL	(Sweden) **R Söderling**	**6**	**6**

Third round
Q	(France) G Simon	3	2
(Belarus) **M Mirnyi**	**6**	**6**
15	(Czech Republic) **R Štěpánek**	**6**	**6**
LL	(Sweden) R Söderling	3	2

Quarterfinals
(Belarus) M Mirnyi	6^{5}	1
15	(Czech Republic) **R Štěpánek**	**7^{7}**	**6**
