= 2002 BMW Open – Doubles =

Doubles
- 2002 BMW Open

Final
- Champions: (Czech Republic) Petr Luxa (Czech Republic) Radek Štěpánek
- Runners-up: (Czech Republic) Petr Pála (Czech Republic) Pavel Vízner
- Score: 6–0, 6–7^{(4–7)}, [11–9]

Events
Singles	Doubles
← 2001 ·	BMW Open	· 2003 →

Petr Luxa and Radek Štěpánek were the defending champions and won in the final 6–0, 6–7^{(4–7)}, [11–9] against Petr Pála and Pavel Vízner.

== Seeds ==
1. (Australia) Joshua Eagle / (Australia) Sandon Stolle (quarterfinals)
2. (Czech Republic) Petr Pála / (Czech Republic) Pavel Vízner (final)
3. (Germany) David Prinosil / (United States) Jeff Tarango (first round)
4. (Argentina) Juan Ignacio Chela / (Argentina) David Nalbandian (first round)

== Draw ==
=== Key ===
- Q = Qualifier
- WC = Wild card
- LL = Lucky loser
- Alt = Alternate
- SE = Special exempt
- PR = Protected ranking
- ITF = ITF entry
- JE = Junior exempt
- w/o = Walkover
- r = Retired
- d = Defaulted
- SR = Special ranking

First round
1	(Australia) J Eagle (Australia) S Stolle	3	6	[10]
(Ecuador) N Lapentti (Australia) M Philippoussis	6	4	[5]
(Czech Republic) L Friedl (Japan) T Shimada	5	3
(Czech Republic) P Luxa (Czech Republic) R Štěpánek	7	6
3	(Germany) D Prinosil (United States) J Tarango	3	7^{7}	[6]
(Czech Republic) T Cibulec (Czech Republic) C Suk	6	6^{2}	[10]
WC	(Germany) L Burgsmüller (Germany) J Knippschild	6	5	[7]
(Australia) W Arthurs (Australia) P Hanley	4	7	[10]
WC	(Germany) R Schüttler (Russia) M Youzhny	6	3	[7]
(Argentina) D Orsanic (Argentina) M Rodríguez	3	6	[10]
WC	(Germany) N Kiefer (Romania) A Pavel	6	3	[10]
4	(Argentina) J I Chela (Argentina) D Nalbandian	3	6	[4]
(Zimbabwe) B Black (South Africa) R Koenig	6	4	[4]
(Australia) A Florent (Australia) D Macpherson	3	6	[10]
(Germany) T Haas (Belarus) M Mirnyi	5	6^{4}
2	(Czech Republic) P Pála (Czech Republic) P Vízner	7	7^{7}

Quarterfinals
1	(Australia) J Eagle (Australia) S Stolle	6^{1}	7^{7}	[8]
(Czech Republic) P Luxa (Czech Republic) R Štěpánek	7^{7}	6^{1}	[10]
(Czech Republic) T Cibulec (Czech Republic) C Suk	3	4
(Australia) W Arthurs (Australia) P Hanley	6	6
(Argentina) D Orsanic (Argentina) M Rodríguez	6	0	[7]
WC	(Germany) N Kiefer (Romania) A Pavel	4	6	[10]
(Australia) A Florent (Australia) D Macpherson	5	6	[11]
2	(Czech Republic) P Pála (Czech Republic) P Vízner	7	3	[13]

Semifinals
(Czech Republic) P Luxa (Czech Republic) R Štěpánek	6	6
(Australia) W Arthurs (Australia) P Hanley	2	4
WC	(Germany) N Kiefer (Romania) A Pavel	4	6	[3]
2	(Czech Republic) P Pála (Czech Republic) P Vízner	6	4	[10]

Final
(Czech Republic) P Luxa (Czech Republic) R Štěpánek	6	6^{4}	[11]
2	(Czech Republic) P Pála (Czech Republic) P Vízner	0	7^{7}	[9]
