= 1999 BMW Open =

- Date: 26 April – 3 May
- Edition: 83rd
- Category: World Series
- Draw: 32S / 16D
- Prize money: $500,000
- Surface: Clay / outdoor
- Location: Munich, Germany
- Venue: MTTC Iphitos

Champions

Singles
- (Argentina) Franco Squillari

Doubles
- (Argentina) Daniel Orsanic / (Argentina) Mariano Puerta
← 1998 ·	BMW Open	· 2000 →

The 1999 BMW Open was a men's tennis tournament played on Clay courts in Munich, Germany that was part of the World Series of the 1999 ATP Tour. It was the eighty-third edition of the tournament and was held from 26 April until 3 May 1999. Unseeded Franco Squillari won the singles title.

== Finals ==
=== Singles ===
(Argentina) Franco Squillari defeated (Romania) Andrei Pavel, 6–4, 6–3.

- It was Squillari's only title of the year and the 1st of his career.

=== Doubles ===
(Argentina) Daniel Orsanic / (Argentina) Mariano Puerta defeated (Italy) Massimo Bertolini / (Italy) Cristian Brandi, 7–6^{(7–3)}, 3–6, 7–6^{(7–3)}.

- It was Orsanic's 1st title of the year and the 6th of his career. It was Puerta's 1st title of the year and the 3rd of his career.
