= 1998 BMW Open =

- Date: 27 April – 4 May
- Edition: 82nd
- Category: World Series
- Draw: 32S / 16D
- Surface: Clay / outdoor
- Location: Munich, Germany
- Venue: MTTC Iphitos

Champions

Singles
- (Sweden) Thomas Enqvist

Doubles
- (Australia) Todd Woodbridge / (Australia) Mark Woodforde
← 1997 ·	BMW Open	· 1999 →

The 1998 BMW Open was an Association of Tennis Professionals men's tennis tournament held in Munich, Germany. The tournament was held from 27 April to 4 May 1998. Seventh-seeded Thomas Enqvist won the singles title.

== Finals ==
=== Singles ===
(Sweden) Thomas Enqvist defeated (United States) Andre Agassi 6–7^{(4–7)}, 7–6^{(8–6)}, 6–3

- It was Enqvist's 2nd title of the year and the 14th of his career.

=== Doubles ===
(Australia) Todd Woodbridge / (Australia) Mark Woodforde defeated (Australia) Joshua Eagle / (Australia) Andrew Florent 6–0, 6–3

- It was Woodbridge's 4th title of the year and the 57th of his career. It was Woodforde's 4th title of the year and the 60th of his career.
