= 2000 BMW Open =

- Date: 1–8 May
- Edition: 84th
- Category: International Series
- Draw: 32S / 16D
- Prize money: $375,000
- Surface: Clay / outdoor
- Location: Munich, Germany
- Venue: MTTC Iphitos

Champions

Singles
- (Argentina) Franco Squillari

Doubles
- (South Africa) David Adams / (South Africa) John-Laffnie de Jager
← 1999 ·	BMW Open	· 2001 →

The 2000 BMW Open was an Association of Tennis Professionals men's tennis tournament played on outdoor clay courts at the MTTC Iphitos in Munich, Germany. It was the 84th edition of the tournament and was held from 1 May to 8 May 2000. Seventh-seeded Franco Squillari won the singles title.

== Finals ==
=== Singles ===
(Argentina) Franco Squillari defeated (Germany) Tommy Haas 6–4, 6–4

- It was Squillari's 1st title of the year and the 2nd of his career.

=== Doubles ===
(South Africa) David Adams / (South Africa) John-Laffnie de Jager defeated (Belarus) Max Mirnyi / (Federal Republic of Yugoslavia) Nenad Zimonjić 6–4, 6–4

- It was Adams's 3rd title of the year and the 16th of his career. It was de Jager's 3rd title of the year and the 7th of his career.
