= 2009 SAP Open – Singles =

Singles
- 2009 SAP Open

Final
- Champion: (Czech Republic) Radek Štěpánek
- Runner-up: (United States) Mardy Fish
- Score: 3–6, 6–4, 6–2

Details
- Draw: 32 (4Q / 3WC)
- Seeds: 8

Events
Singles	Doubles
- Pacific Coast Championships

Andy Roddick was the defending champion, but lost to Radek Štěpánek in the semifinals.

== Seeds ==
1. (United States) Andy Roddick (semifinals)
2. (Argentina) Juan Martín del Potro (quarterfinals)
3. (United States) James Blake (semifinals)
4. (Czech Republic) Radek Štěpánek (champion)
5. (United States) Mardy Fish (final)
6. (United States) Sam Querrey (quarterfinals)
7. (Russia) Igor Kunitsyn (first round)
8. (United States) Robby Ginepri (first round)

== Draw ==
Key

- Q = Qualifier
- WC = Wild card
- LL = Lucky loser
- Alt = Alternate
- ITF = ITF entry
- PR = Protected ranking
- SR = Special ranking
- SE = Special exempt
- JE = Junior exempt
- JR = Junior Accelerator Programme entrant
- CO = College Accelerator Programme entrant
- NG = Next Gen Accelerator Program entrant
- w/o = Walkover
- r = Retired
- d = Defaulted

=== Finals ===
Semifinals
1	(United States) Andy Roddick	6	6^{5}	4
4	(Czech Republic) Radek Štěpánek	3	7	6
3	(United States) James Blake	3	2
5	(United States) Mardy Fish	6	6

Final
4	(Czech Republic) Radek Štěpánek	3	6	6
5	(United States) Mardy Fish	6	4	2

=== Top half ===
First round
1	(United States) A Roddick	6	7
Q	(Sweden) M Ryderstedt	0	6^{3}
(Latvia) E Gulbis	7	6
LL	(Brazil) R Mello	6^{4}	4
(Germany) T Haas	6	7
WC	(Germany) L Pörschke	1	6^{8}
(Belgium) C Rochus	6	7
7	(Russia) I Kunitsyn	2	6^{7}
4	(Czech Republic) R Štěpánek	5	6	6
Q	(Germany) D Meffert	7	3	1
(Argentina) G Cañas	6^{7}	5
(Australia) C Guccione	7	7
(United States) T Dent	6	6
(United States) B Reynolds	3	4
Q	(United States) T Widom	3	7	6
8	(United States) R Ginepri	6	6^{2}	4

Second round
1	(United States) A Roddick	6	7
(Latvia) E Gulbis	3	6^{3}
(Germany) T Haas	6	7
(Belgium) C Rochus	2	5
4	(Czech Republic) R Štěpánek	6	7
(Australia) C Guccione	2	6^{1}
(United States) T Dent	7	3	2
Q	(United States) T Widom	6^{5}	6	6

Quarterfinals
1	(United States) A Roddick	7	6
(Germany) T Haas	5	4
4	(Czech Republic) R Štěpánek	5	6	6
Q	(United States) T Widom	7	0	0

Semifinals
1	(United States) A Roddick	6	6^{5}	4
4	(Czech Republic) R Štěpánek	3	7	6

=== Bottom half ===
First round
6	(United States) S Querrey	6	5	7
WC	(Cyprus) M Baghdatis	3	7	6^{5}
(Croatia) R Karanušić	6	6^{4}	2
(Germany) D Gremelmayr	3	7	6
(Finland) J Nieminen	5	7	4
(France) F Serra	7	6^{1}	6
(United States) V Spadea	3	4
3	(United States) J Blake	6	6
5	(United States) M Fish	7	6
(Australia) L Hewitt	6^{5}	3
WC	(United States) J Isner	7	6
LL	(Paraguay) R Delgado	6^{9}	4
(Japan) K Nishikori	7	6
(Luxembourg) G Müller	5	2
Q	(Italy) A Stoppini	6^{5}	6^{5}
2	(Argentina) JM del Potro	7	7

Second round
6	(United States) S Querrey	6	6
(Germany) D Gremelmayr	3	2
(France) F Serra	4	3
3	(United States) J Blake	6	6
5	(United States) M Fish	6	6^{4}	7
WC	(United States) J Isner	2	7	5
(Japan) K Nishikori	2	2
2	(Argentina) JM del Potro	6	6

Quarterfinals
6	(United States) S Querrey	6^{9}	3
3	(United States) J Blake	7	6
5	(United States) M Fish	6	6
2	(Argentina) JM del Potro	3	4

Semifinals
3	(United States) J Blake	3	2
5	(United States) M Fish	6	6

== Qualifying ==
=== Seeds ===
1. (United States) Robert Kendrick (second round)
2. (Japan) Go Soeda (first round)
3. (United States) Donald Young (second round)
4. (India) Somdev Devvarman (second round)
5. (Belgium) Xavier Malisse (first round)
6. (Brazil) Ricardo Mello (qualifying competition, lucky loser)
7. (Canada) Peter Polansky (first round)
8. (Italy) Andrea Stoppini (qualified)

=== Qualifiers ===
1. (Germany) Dominik Meffert
2. (Italy) Andrea Stoppini
3. (Sweden) Michael Ryderstedt
4. (United States) Todd Widom

=== Lucky losers ===
1. (Brazil) Ricardo Mello
2. (Paraguay) Ramón Delgado

=== Draw ===
==== First qualifier ====
First round
1	(United States) Robert Kendrick	3	7^{7}	6
(Philippines) Cecil Mamiit	6	6^{5}	2
(United States) Alex Kuznetsov	6	6
(United States) Travis Rettenmaier	3	3
(Germany) Dominik Meffert	6	6
(United States) Michael Yani	2	4
(Canada) Frédéric Niemeyer	6	6
5	(Belgium) Xavier Malisse	3	2

Second round
1	(United States) Robert Kendrick	6^{7}	1
(United States) Alex Kuznetsov	7^{9}	6
(Germany) Dominik Meffert	6	6
(Canada) Frédéric Niemeyer	3	3

Qualifying competition
(United States) Alex Kuznetsov	5	6^{1}
(Germany) Dominik Meffert	7	7^{7}

==== Second qualifier ====
First round
2	(Japan) Go Soeda	3	3
(Paraguay) Ramón Delgado	6	6
(South Korea) Jun Woong-sun	7	6
(United States) Lester Cook	5	3
(United States) Tim Smyczek	6	6
(Japan) Hiroki Kondo	2	1
WC	(United States) Chris Wettengel	2	3
8	(Italy) Andrea Stoppini	6	6

Second round
(Paraguay) Ramón Delgado	6	6
(South Korea) Jun Woong-sun	3	4
(United States) Tim Smyczek	2	1
8	(Italy) Andrea Stoppini	6	6

Qualifying competition
(Paraguay) Ramón Delgado	2	5
8	(Italy) Andrea Stoppini	6	7

==== Third qualifier ====
First round
3	(United States) Donald Young	6	6
WC	(United States) John Lamble	4	0
(Sweden) Michael Ryderstedt	6	6
(Slovenia) Luka Gregorc	2	3
(Ecuador) Giovanni Lapentti	3	7^{8}	6
(United States) Michael McClune	6	6^{6}	3
(Moldova) Roman Borvanov	4	4
6	(Brazil) Ricardo Mello	6	6

Second round
3	(United States) Donald Young	3	2
(Sweden) Michael Ryderstedt	6	6
(Ecuador) Giovanni Lapentti	2	6^{4}
6	(Brazil) Ricardo Mello	6	7^{7}

Qualifying competition
(Sweden) Michael Ryderstedt	6	6^{6}	6
6	(Brazil) Ricardo Mello	3	7^{8}	3

==== Fourth qualifier ====
First round
4	(India) Somdev Devvarman	4	6	6
WC	(Serbia) Filip Krajinović	6	3	1
(New Zealand) Artem Sitak	4	0
(United States) Todd Widom	6	6
(France) Jean-Christophe Faurel	6	6
WC	(United States) Robert Yim	3	4
(United States) Eric Nunez	7^{9}	7^{7}
7	(Canada) Peter Polansky	6^{7}	6^{3}

Second round
4	(India) Somdev Devvarman	3	6^{4}
(United States) Todd Widom	6	7^{7}
(France) Jean-Christophe Faurel	6^{3}	4
(United States) Eric Nunez	7^{7}	6

Qualifying competition
(United States) Todd Widom	7	4	6
(United States) Eric Nunez	5	6	1
