= 1995 BMW Open – Singles =

Singles
- 1995 BMW Open

Final
- Champion: (South Africa) Wayne Ferreira
- Runner-up: (Germany) Michael Stich
- Score: 7–5, 7–6^{(8–6)}

Details
- Draw: 32
- Seeds: 8

Events
Singles	Doubles
← 1994 ·	BMW Open	· 1996 →

Michael Stich was the defending champion, but lost in the final this year.

Wayne Ferreira won the title, defeating Stich 7–5, 7–6^{(8–6)} in the final.

== Seeds ==
1. (Germany) Boris Becker (first round)
2. (Russia) Yevgeny Kafelnikov (first round)
3. (Germany) Michael Stich (final)
4. (South Africa) Wayne Ferreira (champion)
5. (Ukraine) Andrei Medvedev (first round)
6. (Sweden) Stefan Edberg (quarterfinals)
7. (Germany) Bernd Karbacher (second round)
8. (Czech Republic) Karel Nováček (first round)

== Draw ==
=== Key ===
- Q = Qualifier
- WC = Wild card
- LL = Lucky loser
- Alt = Alternate
- SE = Special exempt
- PR = Protected ranking
- ITF = ITF entry
- JE = Junior exempt
- w/o = Walkover
- r = Retired
- d = Defaulted
- SR = Special ranking

=== Finals ===
Semifinals
(Uruguay) Marcelo Filippini	4	3
3	(Germany) Michael Stich	6	6
4	(South Africa) Wayne Ferreira	6	2	6
(Spain) Àlex Corretja	3	6	4

Final
3	(Germany) Michael Stich	6	2	6
4	(South Africa) Wayne Ferreira	2	6	3

=== Top half ===
First round
1	(Germany) B Becker	7	2	2
(Germany) H Dreekmann	5	6	6
(Uruguay) M Filippini	6	6
Q	(Sweden) J Svensson	4	3
(Spain) J Sánchez	6	6^{4}	6
(Czech Republic) S Doseděl	2	7^{7}	3
(Austria) G Schaller	6	7^{8}
8	(Czech Republic) K Nováček	4	6^{6}
3	(Germany) M Stich	4	6	7
(Peru) J Yzaga	6	4	5
(Austria) H Skoff	2	0
(Slovakia) K Kučera	6	6
(France) A Boetsch	6	7
(Russia) A Chesnokov	3	5
(Australia) P Rafter	6^{2}	3
WC/6	(Sweden) S Edberg	7^{7}	6

Second round
(Germany) H Dreekmann	1	6	3
(Uruguay) M Filippini	6	3	6
(Spain) J Sánchez	3	2
(Austria) G Schaller	6	6
3	(Germany) M Stich	6	5	6
(Slovakia) K Kučera	2	7	3
(France) A Boetsch	7^{7}	4	6^{3}
WC/6	(Sweden) S Edberg	6^{3}	6	7^{7}

Quarterfinals
(Uruguay) M Filippini	7	6
(Austria) G Schaller	5	1
3	(Germany) M Stich	6	6
WC/6	(Sweden) S Edberg	4	0

Semifinals
(Uruguay) M Filippini	4	3
3	(Germany) M Stich	6	6

=== Bottom half ===
First round
5	(Ukraine) A Medvedev	6	4	2
(Italy) R Furlan	4	6	6
Q	(Spain) J Burillo	7	5	1
WC	(Germany) O Gross	5	7	6
Q	(Romania) D Pescariu	6	6
(Germany) M Zoecke	4	2
(Czech Republic) D Vacek	4	2
4	(South Africa) W Ferreira	6	6
7	(Germany) B Karbacher	6	6
(France) C Pioline	2	2
Q	(Netherlands) S Schalken	6	3	6
(Czech Republic) P Korda	4	6	3
(Spain) C Costa	2	3
(Spain) À Corretja	6	6
WC	(Germany) M Sinner	6	6
2	(Russia) Y Kafelnikov	4	3

Second round
(Italy) R Furlan	6^{9}	4
WC	(Germany) O Gross	7^{11}	6
Q	(Romania) D Pescariu	3	6^{2}
4	(South Africa) W Ferreira	6	7^{7}
7	(Germany) B Karbacher	6^{4}	7^{7}	6^{3}
Q	(Netherlands) S Schalken	7^{7}	6^{4}	7^{7}
(Spain) À Corretja	6	6
WC	(Germany) M Sinner	2	2

Quarterfinals
WC	(Germany) O Gross	6^{4}	3
4	(South Africa) W Ferreira	7^{7}	6
Q	(Netherlands) S Schalken	5	2
(Spain) À Corretja	7	6

Semifinals
4	(South Africa) W Ferreira	6	2	6
(Spain) À Corretja	3	6	4
