= 2001 BMW Open – Singles =

Singles
- 2001 BMW Open

Final
- Champion: (Czech Republic) Jiří Novák
- Runner-up: (France) Antony Dupuis
- Score: 6–4, 7–5

Details
- Draw: 32 (4 Q / 3 WC )
- Seeds: 8

Events
Singles	Doubles
- BMW Open

Franco Squillari was the defending champion but lost in the quarterfinals to Bohdan Ulihrach.

Jiří Novák won in the final 6–4, 7–5 against Antony Dupuis.

== Seeds ==
1. (Russia) Yevgeny Kafelnikov (first round)
2. (Sweden) Thomas Enqvist (second round)
3. (Argentina) Franco Squillari (quarterfinals)
4. (South Africa) Wayne Ferreira (first round)
5. (Sweden) Thomas Johansson (second round)
6. (Chile) Marcelo Ríos (second round)
7. (Morocco) ~~Hicham Arazi~~ (withdrew)
8. (Netherlands) Sjeng Schalken (second round)

== Draw ==
Key

- Q = Qualifier
- WC = Wild card
- LL = Lucky loser
- Alt = Alternate
- ITF = ITF entry
- PR = Protected ranking
- SR = Special ranking
- SE = Special exempt
- JE = Junior exempt
- JR = Junior Accelerator Programme entrant
- CO = College Accelerator Programme entrant
- NG = Next Gen Accelerator Program entrant
- w/o = Walkover
- r = Retired
- d = Defaulted

=== Finals ===
Semifinals
(Morocco) Younes El Aynaoui	7	1	2
(France) Antony Dupuis	5	6	6
(Czech Republic) Bohdan Ulihrach	4	4
(Czech Republic) Jiří Novák	6	6

Final
(France) Antony Dupuis	4	5
(Czech Republic) Jiří Novák	6	7

=== Top half ===
First round
1	(Russia) Y Kafelnikov	7^{7}	5	3
Q	(Austria) W Eschauer	6^{2}	7	6
(Switzerland) M Rosset	6^{7}	2
Q	(Germany) T Behrend	7^{9}	6
(France) J Boutter	6	6^{5}	6^{3}
(Morocco) Y El Aynaoui	3	7^{7}	7^{7}
(Russia) N Davydenko	6^{1}	3
5	(Sweden) T Johansson	7^{7}	6
4	(South Africa) W Ferreira	6	2	1
(France) A Dupuis	3	6	6
(Sweden) A Vinciguerra	6	6
Q	(Czech Republic) T Zíb	4	1
WC	(Germany) B Phau	7	1	1
Q	(Brazil) F Saretta	5	6	6
(Armenia) S Sargsian	2	4
6	(Chile) M Ríos	6	6

Second round
Q	(Austria) W Eschauer	6	1	0
Q	(Germany) T Behrend	2	6	6
(Morocco) Y El Aynaoui	6	6
5	(Sweden) T Johansson	4	4
(France) A Dupuis	7^{7}	6
(Sweden) A Vinciguerra	6^{5}	4
Q	(Brazil) F Saretta	6	6
6	(Chile) M Ríos	3	2

Quarterfinals
Q	(Germany) T Behrend	2	4
(Morocco) Y El Aynaoui	6	6
(France) A Dupuis	3	7^{8}	6
Q	(Brazil) F Saretta	6	6^{6}	2

Semifinals
(Morocco) Y El Aynaoui	7	1	2
(France) A Dupuis	5	6	6

=== Bottom half ===
First round
8	(Netherlands) S Schalken	6^{6}	6	6
(Ecuador) N Lapentti	7^{8}	3	4
(Czech Republic) B Ulihrach	6	3	6
(Italy) D Sanguinetti	4	6	0
(Germany) C Vinck	7	6
(France) F Santoro	5	1
WC	(Croatia) G Ivanišević	3	3
3	(Argentina) F Squillari	6	6
LL	(Brazil) D Melo	5	7^{7}	3
(Australia) W Arthurs	7	6^{2}	6
WC	(Spain) E Benfele Álvarez	1	6	5
(Germany) R Schüttler	6	3	7
(Czech Republic) J Novák	6	7
LL	(Austria) M Hipfl	1	5
(Germany) D Elsner	4	1
2	(Sweden) T Enqvist	6	6

Second round
8	(Netherlands) S Schalken	7	3	6^{6}
(Czech Republic) B Ulihrach	5	6	7^{8}
(Germany) C Vinck	2	5
3	(Argentina) F Squillari	6	7
(Australia) W Arthurs	6	6
(Germany) R Schüttler	4	4
(Czech Republic) J Novák	1	6	7^{7}
2	(Sweden) T Enqvist	6	2	6^{2}

Quarterfinals
(Czech Republic) B Ulihrach	6	6
3	(Argentina) F Squillari	4	4
(Australia) W Arthurs	6^{3}	1
(Czech Republic) J Novák	7^{7}	6

Semifinals
(Czech Republic) B Ulihrach	4	4
(Czech Republic) J Novák	6	6
