= 1999 BMW Open – Doubles =

Doubles
- 1999 BMW Open

Final
- Champions: (Argentina) Daniel Orsanic (Argentina) Mariano Puerta
- Runners-up: (Italy) Massimo Bertolini (Italy) Cristian Brandi
- Score: 7–6^{(7–3)}, 3–6, 7–6^{(7–3)}

Events
Singles	Doubles
← 1998 ·	BMW Open	· 2000 →

The 1999 BMW Open was a men's tennis tournament played on Clay courts in Munich, Germany that was part of the World Series of the 1999 ATP Tour. It was the eighty-third edition of the tournament and was held from April 26 – May 3.

Todd Woodbridge and Mark Woodforde were the defending champions, but did not participate this year.

Daniel Orsanic and Mariano Puerta won the title, defeating Massimo Bertolini and Cristian Brandi 7–6, 3–6, 7–6 in the final.

== Seeds ==
1. (South Africa) David Adams / (South Africa) John-Laffnie de Jager (quarterfinals)
2. (South Africa) Piet Norval / (South Africa) Kevin Ullyett (semifinals)
3. (Spain) Tomás Carbonell / (United States) Jim Grabb (semifinals)
4. (Australia) David Macpherson / (Australia) Peter Tramacchi (quarterfinals)

== Draw ==
=== Key ===
- Q = Qualifier
- WC = Wild card
- LL = Lucky loser
- Alt = Alternate
- ITF = ITF entry
- PR = Protected ranking
- SR = Special ranking
- SE = Special exempt
- JE = Junior exempt
- JR = Junior Accelerator Programme entrant
- CO = College Accelerator Programme entrant
- NG = Next Gen Accelerator Program entrant
- w/o = Walkover
- r = Retired
- d = Defaulted

=== Finals ===
First round
1	(South Africa) D Adams (South Africa) J-L de Jager	6	6
(South Africa) W Ferreira (South Africa) M Ondruska	3	4
(Argentina) D Orsanic (Argentina) M Puerta	6	2	7
(South Africa) M Barnard (Germany) M Kohlmann	4	6	6
3	(Spain) T Carbonell (United States) J Grabb	6	7
Q	(Italy) V Santopadre (Netherlands) J Siemerink	2	6
WC	(Germany) H Dreekmann (Germany) C Vinck	4	2
WC	(Germany) B Becker (Germany) T Haas	6	6
(Australia) A Florent (North Macedonia) A Kitinov	6	5	4
(Italy) M Bertolini (Italy) C Brandi	4	7	6
(New Zealand) J Greenhalgh (Netherlands) T Kempers	1	4
4	(Australia) D Macpherson (Australia) P Tramacchi	6	6
(Sweden) P Nyborg (Russia) A Olhovskiy	5	6
(United Kingdom) N Broad (South Africa) R Koenig	7	7
WC	(Germany) L Burgsmüller (Germany) R Schüttler	5	1
2	(South Africa) P Norval (Zimbabwe) K Ullyett	7	6

Quarterfinals
1	(South Africa) D Adams (South Africa) J-L de Jager	4	2
(Argentina) D Orsanic (Argentina) M Puerta	6	6
3	(Spain) T Carbonell (United States) J Grabb	7	7
WC	(Germany) B Becker (Germany) T Haas	5	5
(Italy) M Bertolini (Italy) C Brandi	6	6
4	(Australia) D Macpherson (Australia) P Tramacchi	4	2
(United Kingdom) N Broad (South Africa) R Koenig	6	2	6
2	(South Africa) P Norval (Zimbabwe) K Ullyett	2	6	7

Semifinals
(Argentina) D Orsanic (Argentina) M Puerta	3	7	6
3	(Spain) T Carbonell (United States) J Grabb	6	6	2
(Italy) M Bertolini (Italy) C Brandi	6	6
2	(South Africa) P Norval (Zimbabwe) K Ullyett	4	4

Final
(Argentina) D Orsanic (Argentina) M Puerta	7	3	7
(Italy) M Bertolini (Italy) C Brandi	6^{3}	6	6^{3}
