= 2009 SAP Open – Doubles =

Doubles
- 2009 SAP Open

Final
- Champions: (Germany) Tommy Haas (Czech Republic) Radek Štěpánek
- Runners-up: (India) Rohan Bopanna (Finland) Jarkko Nieminen
- Score: 6–2, 6–3

Details
- Draw: 16
- Seeds: 4

Events
Singles	Doubles
← 2008 ·	Pacific Coast Championships	· 2010 →

Scott Lipsky and David Martin are the defending champions, but lost in the first round to Eric Butorac and Ashley Fisher.

== Seeds ==
1. (United States) Bob Bryan / (United States) Mike Bryan (quarterfinals)
2. (United States) Travis Parrott / (Slovakia) Filip Polášek (first round)
3. (Australia) Paul Hanley / (Australia) Jordan Kerr (first round)
4. (Australia) Stephen Huss / (United Kingdom) Ross Hutchins (semifinals)

== Draw ==
=== Key ===
- Q = Qualifier
- WC = Wild card
- LL = Lucky loser
- Alt = Alternate
- SE = Special exempt
- PR = Protected ranking
- ITF = ITF entry
- JE = Junior exempt
- w/o = Walkover
- r = Retired
- d = Defaulted
- SR = Special ranking

=== Draw ===
First round
1	(United States) B Bryan (United States) M Bryan	6	6
WC	(Thailand) S Ratiwatana (Thailand) S Ratiwatana	0	3
(United States) R Ram (United States) B Reynolds	2	4
(India) R Bopanna (Finland) J Nieminen	6	6
4	(Australia) S Huss (United Kingdom) R Hutchins	6	6
(Latvia) E Gulbis (Russia) I Kunitsyn	3	3
(Germany) F Moser (France) F Serra	6	4	[5]
WC	(United States) R Ginepri (United States) T Rettenmaier	2	6	[10]
(United States) S Lipsky (United States) D Martin	4	5
(United States) E Butorac (Australia) A Fisher	6	7
(Germany) T Haas (Czech Republic) R Štěpánek	7	2	[10]
3	(Australia) P Hanley (Australia) J Kerr	5	6	[5]
(Argentina) G Cañas (Argentina) JM del Potro
(United States) J Cerretani (United States) S Querrey	w/o
(United States) J Blake (United States) M Fish	7	7
2	(United States) T Parrott (Slovakia) F Polášek	5	6^{4}

Quarterfinals
1	(United States) B Bryan (United States) M Bryan	4	6	[5]
(India) R Bopanna (Finland) J Nieminen	6	4	[10]
4	(Australia) S Huss (United Kingdom) R Hutchins	6	7
WC	(United States) R Ginepri (United States) T Rettenmaier	4	6^{4}
(United States) E Butorac (Australia) A Fisher	6	4	[6]
(Germany) T Haas (Czech Republic) R Štěpánek	4	6	[10]
(United States) J Cerretani (United States) S Querrey	1	4
(United States) J Blake (United States) M Fish	6	6

Semifinals
(India) R Bopanna (Finland) J Nieminen	3	7	[10]
4	(Australia) S Huss (United Kingdom) R Hutchins	6	6^{5}	[5]
(Germany) T Haas (Czech Republic) R Štěpánek	w/o
(United States) J Blake (United States) M Fish

Final
(India) R Bopanna (Finland) J Nieminen	2	3
(Germany) T Haas (Czech Republic) R Štěpánek	6	6
