= 2000 BMW Open – Doubles =

Doubles
- 2000 BMW Open

Final
- Champions: (South Africa) David Adams (South Africa) John-Laffnie de Jager
- Runners-up: (Belarus) Max Mirnyi (Serbia and Montenegro) Nenad Zimonjić
- Score: 6–4, 6–4

Events
Singles	Doubles
← 1999 ·	BMW Open	· 2001 →

Daniel Orsanic and Mariano Puerta were the defending champions, but Puerta did not participate this year. Orsanic partnered with Jaime Oncins, losing in the quarterfinals.

David Adams and John-Laffnie de Jager won the title, defeating Max Mirnyi and Nenad Zimonjić 6–4, 6–4 in the final.

== Seeds ==
1. (South Africa) David Adams / (South Africa) John-Laffnie de Jager (champions)
2. (Zimbabwe) Wayne Black / (Australia) Andrew Kratzmann (final)
3. N/A
4. N/A

== Draw ==
=== Key ===
- Q = Qualifier
- WC = Wild card
- LL = Lucky loser
- Alt = Alternate
- SE = Special exempt
- PR = Protected ranking
- ITF = ITF entry
- JE = Junior exempt
- w/o = Walkover
- r = Retired
- d = Defaulted
- SR = Special ranking

=== Draw ===
First round
1	(South Africa) D Adams (South Africa) J-L de Jager	7	6
WC	(Germany) R Nicklisch (Sweden) T Nydahl	5	3
(Brazil) J Oncins (Argentina) D Orsanic	6	6
(Japan) T Shimada (South Africa) M Wakefield	4	3
LL	(Australia) B Ellwood (Germany) M Kohlmann	3	6	5
WC	(Germany) J Knippschild (Croatia) I Ljubičić	6	3	7
(Australia) J Eagle (Australia) A Florent	7^{7}	6
WC	(Germany) L Burgsmüller (Germany) R Schüttler	6^{3}	0
(Sweden) P Nyborg (Czech Republic) C Suk	5	6^{4}
Q	(Sweden) T Enqvist (Sweden) T Johansson	7	7^{7}
(Belarus) M Mirnyi (Serbia and Montenegro) N Zimonjić	6	6
LL	(Czech Republic) M Damm (Italy) S Pescosolido	3	4
(North Macedonia) A Kitinov (Czech Republic) D Vacek	2	6	7
(Italy) M Bertolini (Italy) C Brandi	6	4	5
(Argentina) G Etlis (Israel) E Ran	6	6^{5}	7
2	(Zimbabwe) W Black (Australia) A Kratzmann	2	7^{7}	5

Quarterfinals
1	(South Africa) D Adams (South Africa) J-L de Jager	4	6	6
(Brazil) J Oncins (Argentina) D Orsanic	6	4	2
WC	(Germany) J Knippschild (Croatia) I Ljubičić	7	6
(Australia) J Eagle (Australia) A Florent	5	4
Q	(Sweden) T Enqvist (Sweden) T Johansson	3	4
(Belarus) M Mirnyi (Serbia and Montenegro) N Zimonjić	6	6
(North Macedonia) A Kitinov (Czech Republic) D Vacek	6^{2}	6	1
(Argentina) G Etlis (Israel) E Ran	7^{7}	2	6

Semifinals
1	(South Africa) D Adams (South Africa) J-L de Jager	3	6	7^{8}
WC	(Germany) J Knippschild (Croatia) I Ljubičić	6	4	6^{6}
(Belarus) M Mirnyi (Serbia and Montenegro) N Zimonjić	7	6
(Argentina) G Etlis (Israel) E Ran	5	3

Final
1	(South Africa) D Adams (South Africa) J-L de Jager	6	6
(Belarus) M Mirnyi (Serbia and Montenegro) N Zimonjić	4	4
