= 1996 BMW Open =

- Date: 29 April – 5 May 1996
- Edition: 80th
- Category: World Series
- Surface: Clay / outdoor
- Location: Munich, Germany
- Venue: MTTC Iphitos

Champions

Singles
- (Czech Republic) Ctislav Doseděl

Doubles
- (South Africa) Lan Bale / (Netherlands) Stephen Noteboom
- BMW Open

The 1996 BMW Open was a men's tennis tournament played on outdoor clay courts in Munich in Germany and was part of the World Series of the 1996 ATP Tour. The tournament ran from 29 April through 5 May 1996. Unseeded Ctislav Doseděl won the singles title.

== Finals ==
=== Singles ===
(Czech Republic) Ctislav Doseděl defeated (Spain) Carlos Moyá 6–4, 4–6, 6–3

- It was Doseděl's 1st title of the year and the 2nd of his career.

=== Doubles ===
(South Africa) Lan Bale / (Netherlands) Stephen Noteboom defeated (France) Olivier Delaître / (Italy) Diego Nargiso 4–6, 7–6, 6–4

- It was Bale's only title of the year and the 4th of his career. It was Noteboom's only title of the year and the 2nd of his career.
