= 1997 BMW Open – Doubles =

Doubles
- 1997 BMW Open

Final
- Champions: (Argentina) Pablo Albano (Spain) Àlex Corretja
- Runners-up: (Germany) Karsten Braasch (Germany) Jens Knippschild
- Score: 3–6, 7–5, 6–2

Details
- Draw: 16
- Seeds: 4

Events
Singles	Doubles
- BMW Open

Lan Bale and Stephen Noteboom were the defending champions, but did not participate this year.

Pablo Albano and Àlex Corretja won the title, defeating Karsten Braasch and Jens Knippschild 3–6, 7–5, 6–2 in the final.

== Seeds ==
1. (South Africa) Ellis Ferreira / (United States) Patrick Galbraith (first round)
2. (Netherlands) Hendrik Jan Davids / (Netherlands) Menno Oosting (quarterfinals)
3. (Australia) Joshua Eagle / (Australia) Andrew Florent (first round)
4. (South Africa) David Adams / (Netherlands) Fernon Wibier (quarterfinals)

== Draw ==
Key

- Q = Qualifier
- WC = Wild card
- LL = Lucky loser
- Alt = Alternate
- ITF = ITF entry
- PR = Protected ranking
- SR = Special ranking
- SE = Special exempt
- JE = Junior exempt
- JR = Junior Accelerator Programme entrant
- CO = College Accelerator Programme entrant
- NG = Next Gen Accelerator Program entrant
- w/o = Walkover
- r = Retired
- d = Defaulted

=== Draw ===
First round
1	(South Africa) E Ferreira (United States) P Galbraith	1	1
(Germany) M-K Goellner (Germany) D Prinosil	6	6
(Hungary) G Köves (Uzbekistan) O Ogorodov	6	6	4
WC	(Germany) D Elsner (Sweden) T Nydahl	3	7	6
4	(South Africa) D Adams (Netherlands) F Wibier	7	6
(South Africa) B Haygarth (North Macedonia) A Kitinov	5	3
WC	(Australia) M Philippoussis (Switzerland) M Rosset	4	1
(Argentina) P Albano (Spain) À Corretja	6	6
(Germany) K Braasch (Germany) J Knippschild	4	6	6
(South Africa) W Ferreira (South Africa) G Muller	6	2	3
Q	(United States) B Behrens (United States) D DiLucia	6	7
3	(Australia) J Eagle (Australia) A Florent	1	5
WC	(Germany) L Burgsmüller (Germany) A Rădulescu	3	2
(Argentina) L Arnold Ker (Argentina) D Orsanic	6	6
(Italy) C Brandi (Italy) F Messori	3	5
2	(Netherlands) HJ Davids (Netherlands) M Oosting	6	7

Quarterfinals
(Germany) M-K Goellner (Germany) D Prinosil	7	6
WC	(Germany) D Elsner (Sweden) T Nydahl	5	1
4	(South Africa) D Adams (Netherlands) F Wibier	6	4
(Argentina) P Albano (Spain) À Corretja	7	6
(Germany) K Braasch (Germany) J Knippschild	7	6
Q	(United States) B Behrens (United States) D DiLucia	6	3
(Argentina) L Arnold Ker (Argentina) D Orsanic	6	6
2	(Netherlands) HJ Davids (Netherlands) M Oosting	2	4

Semifinals
(Germany) M-K Goellner (Germany) D Prinosil	2	4
(Argentina) P Albano (Spain) À Corretja	6	6
(Germany) K Braasch (Germany) J Knippschild	6	2	7
(Argentina) L Arnold Ker (Argentina) D Orsanic	2	6	6

Final
(Argentina) P Albano (Spain) À Corretja	3	7	6
(Germany) K Braasch (Germany) J Knippschild	6	5	2
