= 2000 BMW Open – Singles =

Singles
- 2000 BMW Open

Final
- Champion: (Argentina) Franco Squillari
- Runner-up: (Germany) Tommy Haas
- Score: 6–4, 6–4

Details
- Draw: 32 (4 Q / 3 WC )
- Seeds: 8

Events
Singles	Doubles
- BMW Open

Franco Squillari was the defending champion.

Squillari successfully defended his title, defeating Tommy Haas 6–4, 6–4 in the final.

== Seeds ==
1. (Sweden) Thomas Enqvist (semifinals)
2. (Morocco) Younes El Aynaoui (quarterfinals)
3. (Germany) Tommy Haas (final)
4. (Argentina) Mariano Zabaleta (first round)
5. (Ukraine) Andrei Medvedev (first round)
6. (Brazil) Fernando Meligeni (quarterfinals)
7. (Argentina) Franco Squillari (champion)
8. (Czech Republic) Slava Doseděl (second round)

== Draw ==
Key

- Q = Qualifier
- WC = Wild card
- LL = Lucky loser
- Alt = Alternate
- ITF = ITF entry
- PR = Protected ranking
- SR = Special ranking
- SE = Special exempt
- JE = Junior exempt
- JR = Junior Accelerator Programme entrant
- CO = College Accelerator Programme entrant
- NG = Next Gen Accelerator Program entrant
- w/o = Walkover
- r = Retired
- d = Defaulted

=== Finals ===
Semifinals
1	(Sweden) Thomas Enqvist	6^{5}	6	4
3	(Germany) Tommy Haas	7^{7}	1	6
(Belarus) Max Mirnyi	2	4
7	(Argentina) Franco Squillari	6	6

Final
3	(Germany) Tommy Haas	4	4
7	(Argentina) Franco Squillari	6	6

=== Top half ===
First round
1	(Sweden) T Enqvist	3	6	6
(Romania) A Pavel	6	4	2
(Croatia) I Ljubičić	6	6
WC	(Germany) A Fahlke	3	4
(Czech Republic) J Novák	6	3
(Germany) R Schüttler	1	2^{r}
WC	(Germany) O Gross	3	2
8	(Czech Republic) S Doseděl	6	6
3	(Germany) T Haas	6	4
(Germany) D Prinosil	1	2^{r}
Q	(Belgium) F Dewulf	3	1
Q	(Czech Republic) B Ulihrach	6	6
LL	(Argentina) F Browne	4	6	7^{7}
WC	(Germany) T Behrend	6	4	6^{3}
(Sweden) J Björkman	6	2	6
5	(Ukraine) A Medvedev	0	6	4

Second round
1	(Sweden) T Enqvist	6	6^{1}	7^{7}
(Croatia) I Ljubičić	2	7^{7}	6^{5}
(Czech Republic) J Novák	6	4	7
8	(Czech Republic) S Doseděl	3	6	5
3	(Germany) T Haas	7	3	6
Q	(Czech Republic) B Ulihrach	5	6	3
LL	(Argentina) F Browne	7	7^{7}
(Sweden) J Björkman	5	6^{3}

Quarterfinals
1	(Sweden) T Enqvist	6	6
(Czech Republic) J Novák	3	4
3	(Germany) T Haas	6	6
LL	(Argentina) F Browne	3	4

Semifinals
1	(Sweden) T Enqvist	6^{5}	6	4
3	(Germany) T Haas	7^{7}	1	6

=== Bottom half ===
First round
6	(Brazil) F Meligeni	6	4	6
(Switzerland) M Rosset	3	6	3
(Croatia) G Ivanišević	6^{3}	1
Q	(Argentina) G Etlis	7^{7}	6
(Czech Republic) D Vacek	0	4
(Argentina) H Gumy	6	6
(Belarus) M Mirnyi	6^{4}	6	7
4	(Argentina) M Zabaleta	7^{7}	3	5
7	(Argentina) F Squillari	6^{6}	6	6
(Germany) J Knippschild	7^{8}	4	1
(Sweden) T Johansson	7^{8}	6^{5}	3
(Czech Republic) M Damm	6^{6}	7^{7}	6
(Australia) R Fromberg	7	6
(France) A Clément	5	1
Q	(France) A di Pasquale	5	4
2	(Morocco) Y El Aynaoui	7	6

Second round
6	(Brazil) F Meligeni	7	3	6
Q	(Argentina) G Etlis	5	6	4
(Argentina) H Gumy	3	0
(Belarus) M Mirnyi	6	6
7	(Argentina) F Squillari	6	6
(Czech Republic) M Damm	2	2
(Australia) R Fromberg	7^{7}	3	1
2	(Morocco) Y El Aynaoui	6^{4}	6	6

Quarterfinals
6	(Brazil) F Meligeni	5	3
(Belarus) M Mirnyi	7	6
7	(Argentina) F Squillari	2	6	7^{8}
2	(Morocco) Y El Aynaoui	6	2	6^{6}

Semifinals
(Belarus) M Mirnyi	2	4
7	(Argentina) F Squillari	6	6
