= 1997 BMW Open – Singles =

Singles
- 1997 BMW Open

Final
- Champion: (Australia) Mark Philippoussis
- Runner-up: (Spain) Àlex Corretja
- Score: 7–6^{(7–3)}, 1–6, 6–4

Details
- Draw: 32
- Seeds: 8

Events
Singles	Doubles
- BMW Open

Mark Philippoussis won the title, defeating Àlex Corretja 7–6^{(7–3)}, 1–6, 6–4 in the final.

Slava Doseděl was the defending champion, but was defeated by Mark Philippoussis in the semifinals.

== Seeds ==
1. (Sweden) Thomas Enqvist (second round)
2. (Spain) Carlos Moyà (quarterfinals)
3. (South Africa) Wayne Ferreira (second round)
4. (Spain) Félix Mantilla (first round)
5. (Spain) Alberto Berasategui (second round)
6. (Spain) Àlex Corretja (final)
7. (Switzerland) Marc Rosset (semifinals)
8. (Australia) Mark Philippoussis (champion)

== Draw ==
Key

- Q = Qualifier
- WC = Wild card
- LL = Lucky loser
- Alt = Alternate
- ITF = ITF entry
- PR = Protected ranking
- SR = Special ranking
- SE = Special exempt
- JE = Junior exempt
- JR = Junior Accelerator Programme entrant
- CO = College Accelerator Programme entrant
- NG = Next Gen Accelerator Program entrant
- w/o = Walkover
- r = Retired
- d = Defaulted

=== Finals ===
Semifinals
8	(Australia) Mark Philippoussis	7	7
(Czech Republic) Slava Doseděl	5	5
5	(Spain) Àlex Corretja	6	6
7	(Switzerland) Marc Rosset	3	1

Final
8	(Australia) Mark Philippoussis	7^{7}	1	6
5	(Spain) Àlex Corretja	6^{3}	6	4

=== Top half ===
First round
1	(Sweden) T Enqvist	6	6
(Slovakia) D Hrbatý	3	4
(Italy) A Gaudenzi	6	3	6
(Russia) A Volkov	4	6	2
(Argentina) H Gumy	3	6	6
(Spain) J Burillo	6	1	2
(Germany) A Rădulescu	6^{3}	6^{5}
8	(Australia) M Philippoussis	7^{7}	7^{7}
WC/3	(South Africa) W Ferreira	3	4
(Germany) M-K Goellner	6	6
Q	(Denmark) F Fetterlein	7^{7}	6
(Spain) R Carretero	6^{4}	4
(Czech Republic) S Doseděl	6	6
(Germany) J Knippschild	4	1
Q	(Argentina) G Cañas	7^{8}	1	4
5	(Spain) A Berasategui	6^{6}	6	6

Second round
1	(Sweden) T Enqvist	6	3	2
(Italy) A Gaudenzi	3	6	6
(Argentina) H Gumy	7^{7}	4	4
8	(Australia) M Philippoussis	6^{2}	6	6
(Germany) M-K Goellner	4	4
Q	(Denmark) F Fetterlein	6	6
(Czech Republic) S Doseděl	4	6	6
5	(Spain) A Berasategui	6	1	4

Quarterfinals
(Italy) A Gaudenzi	5	6	4
8	(Australia) M Philippoussis	7	4	6
Q	(Denmark) F Fetterlein	6^{4}	4
(Czech Republic) S Doseděl	7^{7}	6

Semifinals
8	(Australia) M Philippoussis	7	7
(Czech Republic) S Doseděl	5	5

=== Bottom half ===
First round
6	(Spain) À Corretja	6	6
Q	(Italy) O Camporese	1	3
WC	(Germany) D Elsner	4	4
(Ukraine) A Medvedev	6	6
(Argentina) M Charpentier	4	6	6
(Australia) S Draper	6	4	3
Q	(Germany) M Sinner	5	6	4
4	(Spain) F Mantilla	7	4	0^{d}
7	(Switzerland) M Rosset	2	6	6
(Germany) D Prinosil	6	3	2
(Morocco) K Alami	7	6
(Argentina) L Arnold Ker	5	4
(Italy) R Furlan	2	6	6
(Uzbekistan) O Ogorodov	6	4	1
(Russia) A Olhovskiy	1	6	4
2	(Spain) C Moyà	6	4	6

Second round
6	(Spain) À Corretja	7	2	6
(Ukraine) A Medvedev	5	6	1
(Argentina) M Charpentier	2	1^{r}
Q	(Germany) M Sinner	6	4
7	(Switzerland) M Rosset	6	2	6
(Morocco) K Alami	4	6	4
(Italy) R Furlan	4	7^{7}	5
2	(Spain) C Moyà	6	6^{2}	7

Quarterfinals
6	(Spain) À Corretja	5	6	6
Q	(Germany) M Sinner	7	2	1
7	(Switzerland) M Rosset	7	7^{7}
2	(Spain) C Moyà	5	6^{5}

Semifinals
5	(Spain) À Corretja	6	6
7	(Switzerland) M Rosset	3	1
