= Stephen Noteboom =

Dutch tennis player

- Country (sports): Netherlands
- Born: 31 July 1969 (age 56) Geldrop, Netherlands
- Height: 6 ft 1 in (185 cm)
- Plays: Right-handed
- Prize money: $301,344

Singles
- Career record: 1–2
- Highest ranking: No. 333 (1 November 1993)

Doubles
- Career record: 50–103
- Career titles: 2
- Highest ranking: No. 52 (31 March 1997)

Grand Slam doubles results
- Australian Open: 3R (1997)
- French Open: 3R (1996)
- Wimbledon: 3R (1997)
- US Open: 2R (1996, 1997)

Grand Slam mixed doubles results
- French Open: 1R (1995, 1996, 1998)
- Wimbledon: 2R (1995)

Stephen Noteboom (born 31 July 1969) is a former professional tennis player from the Netherlands.

Noteboom enjoyed most of his tennis success while playing doubles. During his career he won 2 doubles titles. He achieved a career-high doubles ranking of world No. 52 in 1997.

== Career finals ==
=== Doubles (2 titles) ===
Legend
Grand Slam tournaments (0)
Tennis Masters Cup (0)
ATP Masters Series (0)
ATP Championship Series (0)
ATP Tour (2)

Result	W/L	Date	Tournament	Surface	Partner	Opponents	Score
Win	1–0	Jun 1994	Rosmalen, Netherlands	Grass	(Netherlands) Fernon Wibier	(Italy) Diego Nargiso (Sweden) Peter Nyborg	6–3, 1–6, 7–6
Win	2–0	May 1996	Munich, Germany	Clay	(South Africa) Lan Bale	(France) Olivier Delaître (Italy) Diego Nargiso	4–6, 7–6, 6–4
