= Radek Štěpánek =

Czech tennis player (born 1978)

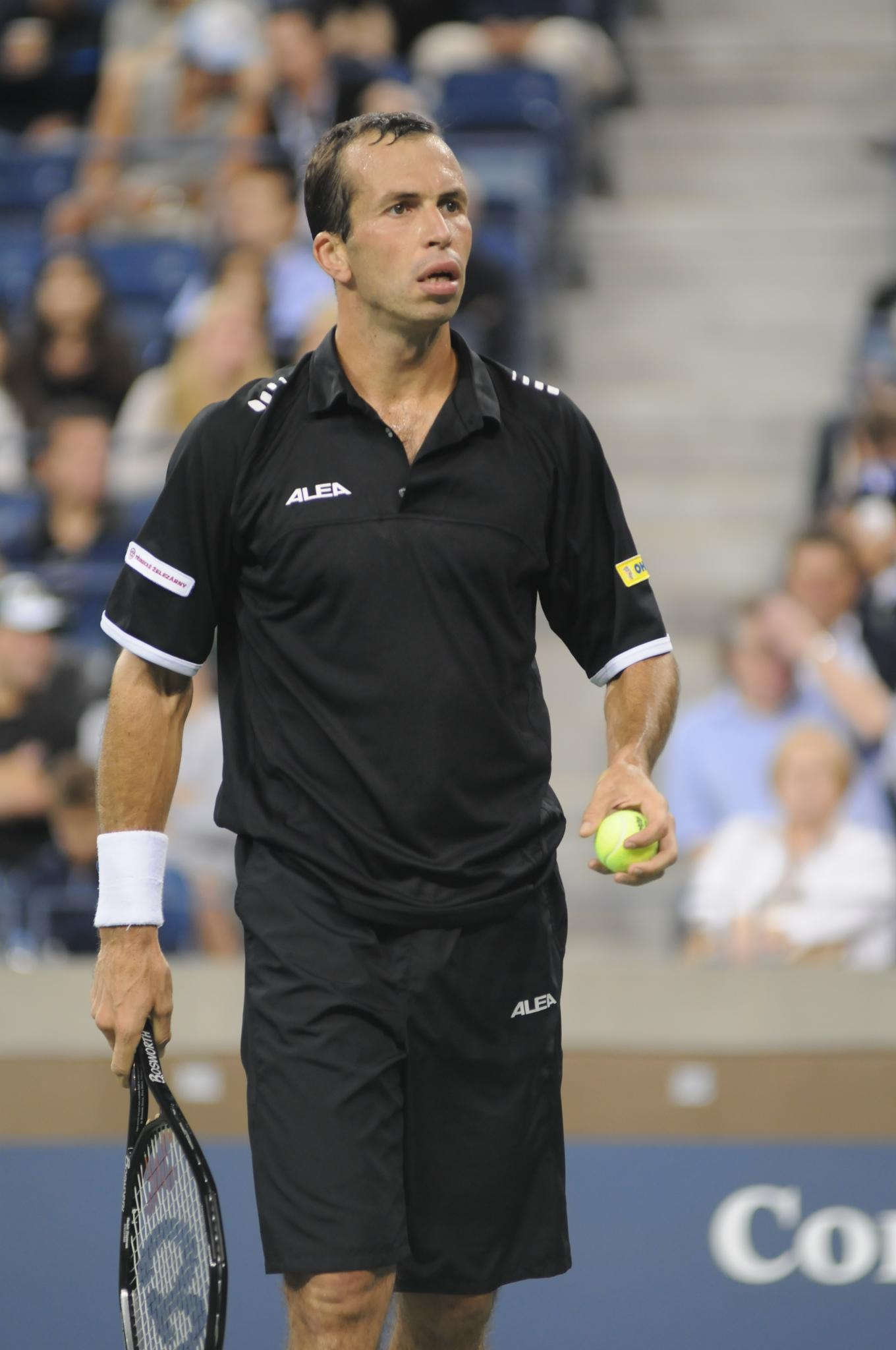
- Štěpánek in 2009
- Country (sports): Czech Republic
- Residence: Monte Carlo, Monaco
- Born: 27 November 1978 (age 47) Karviná, Czechoslovakia (now Czech Republic)
- Height: 1.85 m (6 ft 1 in)
- Turned pro: 1996
- Retired: 2017
- Plays: Right-handed (two-handed backhand)
- Prize money: US$11,343,464

Singles
- Career record: 384–302 (56.0%) (in ATP and Grand Slam level, and in Davis Cup)
- Career titles: 5
- Highest ranking: No. 8 (10 July 2006)

Grand Slam singles results
- Australian Open: 3R (2003, 2005, 2007, 2009, 2013)
- French Open: 4R (2008)
- Wimbledon: QF (2006)
- US Open: 4R (2009)

Other tournaments
- Tour Finals: RR (2008)
- Olympic Games: 1R (2008, 2012)

Doubles
- Career record: 313–197 (ATP and Grand Slam level, and in Davis Cup)
- Career titles: 18
- Highest ranking: No. 4 (12 November 2012)

Grand Slam doubles results
- Australian Open: W (2012)
- French Open: SF (2007)
- Wimbledon: SF (2013, 2014)
- US Open: W (2013)

Other doubles tournaments
- Tour Finals: SF (2012)

Grand Slam mixed doubles results
- Australian Open: 1R (2017)
- Wimbledon: 3R (2016)

Team competitions
- Davis Cup: W (2012, 2013)

Coaching career (2018–)
- Novak Djokovic (2018) Grigor Dimitrov (2019) Sebastian Korda (2022–)
Medal record
Representing Czech Republic
Olympic Games
Bronze medal – third place	2016 Rio de Janeiro	Mixed doubles
- Last updated on: 27 November 2017.

Radek Štěpánek (Czech pronunciation: [ˈradɛk ˈʃcɛpaːnɛk]; born 27 November 1978) is a Czech former professional tennis player. His career-high singles ranking was world No. 8 and best doubles ranking was world No. 4. Štěpánek's biggest achievements are reaching two Masters 1000 event finals and the quarterfinals of Wimbledon in 2006, as well as winning the deciding match for Czech Republic's Davis Cup winning team in 2012 and again in 2013. In doubles, he won his first Grand Slam title at the 2012 Australian Open, along with Indian partner Leander Paes, defeating the Bryan Brothers in the final. Paes and Štěpánek also won the men's doubles title at the 2013 US Open, defeating Bruno Soares and Alexander Peya in the final. In November 2017, he became a coach of Novak Djokovic and in May 2019, he joined Andre Agassi as part of Grigor Dimitrov's coaching staff.

== Early life ==
Born in Karviná, Moravia-Silesia, Štěpánek began playing tennis at age three with his father Vlastimil, who was a tennis coach. Štěpánek's brother is a policeman and his mother a librarian. His cousin is Jaromír Blažek, who represented the Czech Republic as a football goalkeeper. Štěpánek grew up admiring Czech tennis player Ivan Lendl, particularly noting "he was the one who brought professionalism to the sport with his conditioning."

== Career ==
Štěpánek turned professional in 1996. He started on tour as a doubles specialist, winning 12 ATP titles. Since 2002, Štěpánek has focused on being a better singles player while still playing top-level doubles. He is known for his after-the-shot grunting, his over-the-top celebrations and his many relationships with WTA players.

Štěpánek first came to mainstream notice when he defeated former World No. 1 Gustavo Kuerten in five sets on his way to the third round of the 2003 Australian Open.

=== 2006: First ATP title & Wimbledon quarterfinal ===
2006 was Štěpánek's best year to date; he found himself on the verge of getting into the top ten of ATP rankings, as he defeated José Acasuso in the semi-finals of the Masters Series event in Hamburg. He went on to lose the final in straight sets against Spain's Tommy Robredo. At that point, he achieved a career-high ATP world ranking of No. 11 in singles.

Earlier in 2006, he won his first ATP singles title, beating Christophe Rochus in Rotterdam, but he had yet to progress beyond the third round of a Grand Slam tournament until he got into the quarter-finals at Wimbledon beating Frank Dancevic, Xavier Malisse, Juan Carlos Ferrero and Fernando Verdasco, before he was eliminated by 34-year-old Jonas Björkman, after holding match point at 7–6 in the fourth-set tie-break.

This performance helped Štěpánek break into the top 10 and achieve his highest world ranking of no. 8. However, after Wimbledon, Štěpánek was out of action for the rest of the year due to a chronic neck injury.

=== 2007: 2nd ATP title ===
In the second round of the 2007 US Open, Štěpánek played a match against third seed Novak Djokovic, which he ended up losing after 4 hours and 44 minutes of play in a fifth-set tiebreak.

Earlier in 2007, he won his second ATP singles title, beating James Blake in Los Angeles in three sets.

=== 2008 ===
In 2008, he achieved some good results such as reaching the final in San Jose, but losing to Andy Roddick. He also made it to the semifinals in the Rome Masters, losing to Novak Djokovic after he retired due to heat exhaustion. In the 2008 Summer Olympics, he lost to Michaël Llodra in the first round in three sets. Štěpánek finished the season ranked no. 27, but attended the year-end Masters Cup as an alternate. He was vacationing in Thailand and so was able to come to the tournament held in Shanghai without delay. Since he did not have his own tennis gear which got stuck in customs (they were sent from home), he had to borrow a racquet from Novak Djokovic and socks from Andy Murray. After Andy Roddick pulled out due to injury before his second match, Štěpánek entered the tournament with two round-robin ties to play against Roger Federer and Gilles Simon. He gave the second seed Federer a tough match, but lost. He was also beaten by Simon.

=== 2009: 3rd & 4th ATP titles ===
Štěpánek started his 2009 season at the Brisbane International with a new Bosworth racquet, where he claimed his third ATP title after coming back from a set down to defeat Fernando Verdasco in the final. Then, at the Australian Open, he made it to the third round and was overpowered by Verdasco in straight sets.

At the SAP Open in San Jose, he won his fourth ATP singles title, beating American Mardy Fish in a three-set final. He also snapped a four-match losing streak in the tournament against Andy Roddick, upsetting him in the semifinals. He also captured the doubles title teaming up with German Tommy Haas, making it his first time to win the singles and doubles titles at the same tournament.

In the Davis Cup first round tie against France, he lost his opening match to Jo-Wilfried Tsonga in straight sets. However, he regained his confidence and won the doubles rubber the next day and his second singles match against Gilles Simon in straight sets to give the Czech Republic a berth in the quarterfinals. Then, in the Davis Cup quarterfinals, he won the deciding fifth rubber to lead his country to the semifinals. In the semifinals, Štěpánek battled Ivo Karlović to victory in a marathon opener in which the 82 games played equalled the highest number in a Davis Cup rubber since the introduction of the tiebreak in 1989. In that match, he was aced 78 times, but overall hit more winners, over 170 (including service winners). The match was one of the longest in the history of the Davis Cup, lasting 5 hours and 59 minutes. There were only three breaks of serve in the match. In the finals of the Davis Cup versus Spain, Štěpánek lost to David Ferrer after being two sets up. The Czech Republic lost 5–0 to Spain.

=== 2010 ===
Štěpánek returned to the Brisbane International to defend his title. He made a second final appearance, but failed to defend the title, losing to Andy Roddick in straight sets. He also teamed up with Tomáš Berdych to reach the doubles quarterfinals, only to lose to eventual champions Jérémy Chardy and Marc Gicquel. Seeded 13th at the 2010 Australian Open, he lost in the first round to Ivo Karlović in five sets.

=== 2011: 5th ATP title ===
Štěpánek began the 2011 season with a third successive appearance at the 2011 Brisbane International, hoping for a third successive finals appearance, despite only being ranked no. 62. For the first round he was drawn against world no. 67, German Tobias Kamke. Despite struggling for the first set, he eventually won, 5–7, 6–1, 6–4, to set up a second-round match against Mardy Fish, the fourth seed in the tournament. Štěpánek blazed through the match, thrashing the world no. 16 Fish, 6–3, 6–1. In the quarterfinals against seventh seed and world no. 37 Florian Mayer, he had a dominant start, leading 5–1 in the first set, before Mayer managed to break his serve. However, he continued his winning streak, emerging victorious, 6–3, 6–3, to place himself in the first semifinal against Robin Söderling, where he lost.

Štěpánek exited the 2011 French Open in the first round, losing in straight sets to Frenchman Richard Gasquet. He defeated Gaël Monfils in the final of the Legg Mason Tennis Classic.

=== 2012: Australian Open doubles title ===
In January 2012, Štěpánek won the Australian Open Men's doubles title, partnering Leander Paes. They beat top seeds Bob and Mike Bryan in the final.

In April 2012, Serbia's Janko Tipsarević defeated him in five sets to level the Davis Cup quarterfinal at 1–1, after a stormy five-hour match. Tipsarević, Serbia's top player in the absence of world no. 1 Novak Djokovic, saved three match points before securing victory. After the match, Tipsarević accused Štěpánek of using his middle finger inappropriately during their handshake and calling him a "stinky bastard". Štěpánek denied that he did either of these things, and none of the footage taken at the match showed clearly what happened. An online photo of the hands of both players showed Štěpánek's finger folded in, but Štěpánek claims the picture was taken after he was already pulling his hand back. Neither this photo nor footage provided by a Czech TV station conclusively support Tipsarević's version of the events. Štěpánek later stated that what he actually said to Tipsarević was "You don't need to cheat", referring to Tipsarević's winning a point after the ball had bounced twice and erasing a mark before the chair umpire could check whether the ball was in or out.

Štěpánek and Paes made it to the finals of US Open, this time losing to the Bryan brothers in straight sets. On 7 November 2012, Štěpánek and Leander Paes started off with a win in the ATP world tour tournament.

He won the Davis Cup together with Tomáš Berdych against Spain playing both singles and doubles. In the Hollywood-script-like final in Prague, Štěpánek won the decisive rubber against Nicolás Almagro, at the time ranked 21 spots above Štěpánek on the ATP ranking ladder, becoming only the second player 30 or older to win a deciding Davis Cup final match in the history of the competition.

=== 2013: US Open doubles title ===
Štěpánek underwent neck surgery on 21 January to relieve pressure where a disc was pressing on a nerve rendering his right hand numb and weak. He recovered well and won US Open in doubles with Leander Paes.

Later in the year, at New York, he won his second major double title, again with Paes. They defeated the top seeds Mike and Bob Bryan in the semifinals, ending their streak of four major titles. Paes and Štěpánek went on to defeat the second seeds Bruno Soares and Alexander Peya in straight sets in the finals.

In the Davis Cup semifinal, he helped the Czech Republic beat Argentina as he beat Juan Mónaco in the opening singles match and continued to win the doubles with Berdych. In the final against Serbia, he won the doubles and the deciding singles match to defend their title. He became the first person in Davis Cup history to win consecutive live deciding singles rubbers.

=== 2014: Return to top 40 ===
Štěpánek played on the successful Czech Davis Cup that beat the Netherlands at home in the first round and Japan on the road in the quarterfinals.

Štěpánek then had an impressive run in the AEGON Championships, defeating Mikhail Kukushkin, Bernard Tomic, and then 2013's champion Andy Murray. He then took out Kevin Anderson in the quarterfinals, before losing to the eventual runner-up, Feliciano López.

He also reached the semifinals in the 250 event in Bogota, Colombia, losing to Ivo Karlović.

The rest of his singles season was disappointing, and he did not play any singles tournaments after the US Open. In August he brought his ranking up to no. 35.

In doubles, he reached the quarterfinals in Rome and London, before reaching the semifinals at Wimbledon partnering Leander Paes, where they lost to Vasek Pospisil and Jack Sock, the eventual champions.

=== 2015 ===
In the first half of the year, Štěpánek played mostly in Challenger events. He lost in the second round of the French Open to Tomáš Berdych.

=== 2016: Australian Open Doubles runner-up and Olympics mixed doubles bronze medal ===
On 30 January 2016, Štěpánek and his doubles partner, Daniel Nestor, were defeated by Jamie Murray and Bruno Soares in a three-set match in the 2016 Australian Open final.

At 2016 Summer Olympics in Rio de Janeiro, Štěpánek won bronze medal in mixed doubles with partner Lucie Hradecká. They defeated Indian pair of Sania Mirza and Rohan Bopanna.

=== 2017: Retirement ===
In 2017 Stepanek underwent back surgery after the Australian Open. He did not play again and chose to retire in November.

== Playing style ==
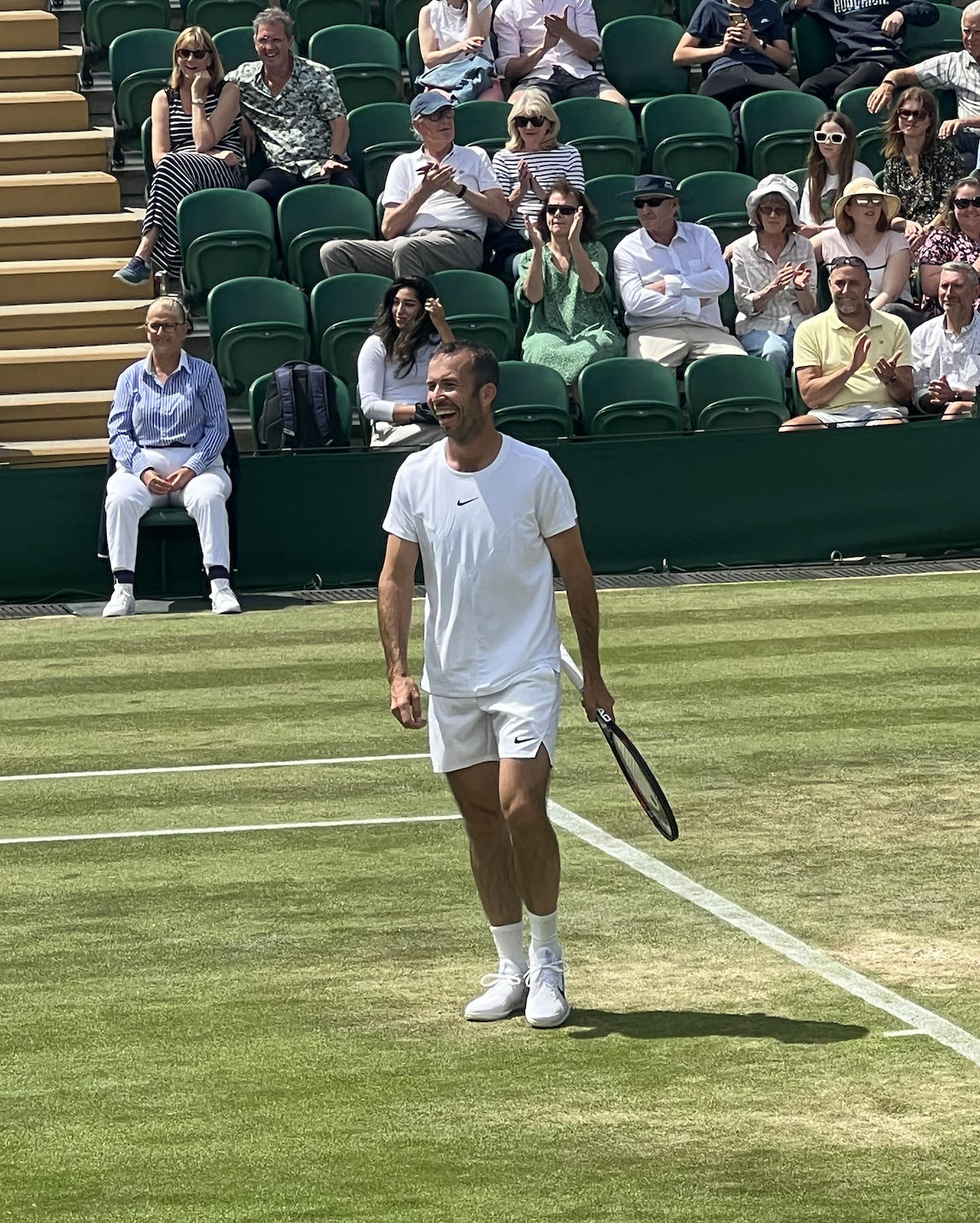
Štěpánek having fun at Wimbledon in the Invitational Doubles tournament in 2023.

Štěpánek is noted for being one of the few serve and volley players on the tour. He is known for his resilience at the net as well as his entertaining and at times comedic plays during matches. Štěpánek has a strong and accurate first serve, often reaching up to 210 km/h with it. Štěpánek's second serve is slower, but like most serve and volley players, it has a great amount of top-spin, giving him time to come up to the net. On his serve, Štěpánek often immediately comes up to the net and volleys, finishing off points quickly. His net play is considered one of the best on the tour. He is known for his reach and anticipation at the net, which allows him to put away would-be passing shots at the net as well as engage in volley-to-volley exchanges, often coming out on top.

However, unlike most serve and volley players, Štěpánek usually does not employ a Chip and charge form of play when receiving. Instead, he engages in baseline rallies. His groundstrokes are not exceptionally powerful, but are consistent and accurate on both wings, allowing him to maintain solid ground at the baseline. If caught up too long in a baseline rally, however, Štěpánek will often place a deep, accurate groundstroke or a drop-shot and come up to the net to volley, finishing off the point quickly. He is often more willing to use a slice than his double-handed backhand.

One of the signature characteristics of Štěpánek is his comedic and entertaining play. Due to the fact that he comes up to the net a lot, he often employs unconventional shots, as well as the occasional trick shot.

== Personal life ==
Štěpánek was engaged to Swiss tennis star Martina Hingis, but they split up in August 2007. He married former top-ten Czech tennis player Nicole Vaidišová in 2010. They separated in 2013. For several months, he dated Czech Wimbledon Champion Petra Kvitová. They split in April 2014. In 2018, he married Vaidišová again, and they have a daughter Stella.

Štěpánek was coached by former Australian Open champion Petr Korda. He endorses ALEA clothing and Nike shoes and was sponsored by Bosworth racquets but later was seen also using Head racquets.

Czech football goalkeeper Jaromír Blažek is his cousin. His brother-in-law is American tennis player Toby Kodat.

== Significant finals ==
=== Grand Slam finals ===
==== Doubles: 5 (2–3) ====
Result	Year	Championship	Surface	Partner	Opponents	Score
Loss	2002	US Open	Hard	(Czech Republic) Jiří Novák	(Belarus) Max Mirnyi (India) Mahesh Bhupathi	3–6, 6–3, 4–6
Win	2012	Australian Open	Hard	(India) Leander Paes	(United States) Bob Bryan (United States) Mike Bryan	7–6^{(7–1)}, 6–2
Loss	2012	US Open	Hard	(India) Leander Paes	(United States) Bob Bryan (United States) Mike Bryan	3–6, 4–6
Win	2013	US Open	Hard	(India) Leander Paes	(Austria) Alexander Peya (Brazil) Bruno Soares	6–1, 6–3
Loss	2016	Australian Open	Hard	(Canada) Daniel Nestor	(United Kingdom) Jamie Murray (Brazil) Bruno Soares	6–2, 4–6, 5–7

=== Masters 1000 finals ===
==== Singles: 2 (0–2) ====
Result	Year	Tournament	Surface	Opponent	Score
Loss	2004	Paris, France	Carpet (i)	(Russia) Marat Safin	3–6, 6–7^{(5–7)}, 3–6
Loss	2006	Hamburg, Germany	Clay	(Spain) Tommy Robredo	1–6, 3–6, 3–6

==== Doubles: 2 (2–0) ====
Result	Year	Tournament	Surface	Partner	Opponents	Score
Win	2012	Miami, U.S.	Hard	(India) Leander Paes	(Belarus) Max Mirnyi (Canada) Daniel Nestor	6–3, 1–6, [10–8]
Win	2012	Shanghai, China	Hard	(India) Leander Paes	(India) Mahesh Bhupathi (India) Rohan Bopanna	6–7^{(7–9)}, 6–3, [10–5]

== Olympic medal matches ==
=== Mixed doubles: (1 Bronze medal) ===
Result	Year	Location	Surface	Partner	Opponents	Score
Bronze	2016	Rio de Janeiro	Hard	(Czech Republic) Lucie Hradecká	(India) Sania Mirza (India) Rohan Bopanna	6–1, 7–5

== ATP career finals ==
=== Singles: 12 (5 titles, 7 runner-ups) ===
Legend Grand Slam tournaments (0–0) ATP World Tour Finals (0–0) ATP World Tour Masters 1000 (0–2) ATP World Tour 500 Series (2–1) ATP World Tour 250 Series (3–4)	Titles by surface Hard (5–4) Clay (0–1) Grass (0–0) Carpet (0–2)	Titles by setting Outdoor (3–2) Indoor (2–5)

Result	W–L	Date	Tournament	Tier	Surface	Opponent	Score
Loss	0–1	Nov 2004	Paris Masters, France	Masters	Carpet (i)	(Russia) Marat Safin	3–6, 6–7^{(5–7)}, 3–6
Loss	0–2	Feb 2005	Milan Indoor, Italy	International	Carpet (i)	(Sweden) Robin Söderling	3–6, 7–6^{(7–2)}, 6–7^{(5–7)}
Loss	0–3	Oct 2005	Vietnam Open, Vietnam	International	Hard (i)	(Sweden) Jonas Björkman	3–6, 6–7^{(4–7)}
Win	1–3	Feb 2006	Rotterdam Open, Netherlands	Intl. Gold	Hard (i)	(Belgium) Christophe Rochus	6–0, 6–3
Loss	1–4	May 2006	German Open, Germany	Masters	Clay	(Spain) Tommy Robredo	1–6, 3–6, 3–6
Win	2–4	Jul 2007	Los Angeles Open, United States	International	Hard	(United States) James Blake	7–6^{(9–7)}, 5–7, 6–2
Loss	2–5	Feb 2008	Pacific Coast Championships, United States	International	Hard (i)	(United States) Andy Roddick	4–6, 5–7
Win	3–5	Jan 2009	Brisbane International, Australia	250 Series	Hard	(Spain) Fernando Verdasco	3–6, 6–3, 6–4
Win	4–5	Feb 2009	Pacific Coast Championships, United States	250 Series	Hard (i)	(United States) Mardy Fish	3–6, 6–4, 6–2
Loss	4–6	Feb 2009	U.S. National Indoor Tennis Championships, United States	500 Series	Hard (i)	(United States) Andy Roddick	5–7, 5–7
Loss	4–7	Jan 2010	Brisbane International, Australia	250 Series	Hard	(United States) Andy Roddick	6–7^{(2–7)}, 6–7^{(7–9)}
Win	5–7	Aug 2011	Washington Open, United States	500 Series	Hard	(France) Gaël Monfils	6–4, 6–4

=== Doubles: 33 (18 titles, 15 runner-ups) ===
Legend Grand Slam tournaments (2–3) ATP World Tour Finals (0–0) ATP World Tour Masters 1000 (2–0) ATP World Tour 500 Series (4–5) ATP World Tour 250 Series (10–7)	Titles by surface Hard (12–14) Clay (5–0) Grass (0–0) Carpet (1–1)	Titles by setting Outdoor (12–12) Indoor (6–3)

Result	W–L	Date	Tournament	Tier	Surface	Partner	Opponents	Score
Win	1–0	May 1999	Prague Open, Czech Republic	World Series	Clay	(Czech Republic) Martin Damm	(United States) Mark Keil (Ecuador) Nicolás Lapentti	6–0, 6–2
Win	2–0	Apr 2001	Estoril Open, Portugal	World Series	Clay	(Czech Republic) Michal Tabara	(United States) Donald Johnson (Federal Republic of Yugoslavia) Nenad Zimonjić	6–4, 6–1
Win	3–0	May 2001	Bavarian Championships, Germany	International	Clay	(Czech Republic) Petr Luxa	(Brazil) Jaime Oncins (Argentina) Daniel Orsanic	5–7, 6–2, 7–6^{(7–5)}
Loss	3–1	Aug 2001	Long Island Open, United States	International	Hard	(Czech Republic) Leoš Friedl	(United States) Jonathan Stark (Zimbabwe) Kevin Ullyett	1–6, 4–6
Loss	3–2	Sep 2001	Hong Kong Open, China	International	Hard	(Czech Republic) Petr Luxa	(Germany) Karsten Braasch (Brazil) André Sá	0–6, 5–7
Win	4–2	Oct 2001	Vienna Open, Austria	Intl. Gold	Hard (i)	(Czech Republic) Martin Damm	(Czech Republic) Jiří Novák (Czech Republic) David Rikl	6–3, 6–2
Loss	4–3	Feb 2002	Copenhagen Open, Denmark	International	Hard (i)	(Czech Republic) Jiří Novák	(Austria) Julian Knowle (Germany) Michael Kohlmann	6–7^{(8–10)}, 5–7
Win	5–3	May 2002	Bavarian Championships, Germany (2)	International	Clay	(Czech Republic) Petr Luxa	(Czech Republic) Petr Pála (Czech Republic) Pavel Vízner	6–0, 6–7^{(4–7)}, [11–9]
Loss	5–4	Sep 2002	US Open, United States	Grand Slam	Hard	(Czech Republic) Jiří Novák	(India) Mahesh Bhupathi (Belarus) Max Mirnyi	3–6, 6–4, 4–6
Loss	5–5	Oct 2002	Vienna Open, Austria	Intl. Gold	Hard (i)	(Czech Republic) Jiří Novák	(Australia) Joshua Eagle (Australia) Sandon Stolle	4–6, 3–6
Win	6–5	Feb 2003	Milan Indoor, Italy	International	Carpet (i)	(Czech Republic) Petr Luxa	(Czech Republic) Tomáš Cibulec (Czech Republic) Pavel Vízner	6–4, 7–6^{(7–4)}
Loss	6–6	Jan 2004	Auckland Open, New Zealand	International	Hard	(Czech Republic) Jiří Novák	(India) Mahesh Bhupathi (France) Fabrice Santoro	6–4, 5–7, 3–6
Win	7–6	Feb 2004	Rotterdam Open, Netherlands	Intl. Gold	Hard (i)	(Australia) Paul Hanley	(Israel) Jonathan Erlich (Israel) Andy Ram	5–7, 7–6^{(7–5)}, 7–5
Win	8–6	Jul 2004	Stuttgart Open, Germany	Intl. Gold	Clay	(Czech Republic) Jiří Novák	(Sweden) Simon Aspelin (Australia) Todd Perry	6–2, 6–4
Win	9–6	Sep 2004	Delray Beach Open, United States	International	Hard	(India) Leander Paes	(Argentina) Gastón Etlis (Argentina) Martín Rodríguez	6–0, 6–3
Loss	9–7	Oct 2004	Grand Prix de Tennis de Lyon, France	International	Carpet (i)	(Sweden) Jonas Björkman	(Israel) Jonathan Erlich (Israel) Andy Ram	6–7^{(2–7)}, 2–6
Win	10–7	Feb 2005	Open 13, France	International	Hard (i)	(Czech Republic) Martin Damm	(The Bahamas) Mark Knowles (Canada) Daniel Nestor	7–6^{(7–4)}, 7–6^{(7–5)}
Win	11–7	Mar 2005	Dubai Championships, United Arab Emirates	Intl. Gold	Hard	(Czech Republic) Martin Damm	(Sweden) Jonas Björkman (France) Fabrice Santoro	6–2, 6–4
Win	12–7	Feb 2006	Open 13, France (2)	International	Hard (i)	(Czech Republic) Martin Damm	(The Bahamas) Mark Knowles (Canada) Daniel Nestor	6–2, 6–7^{(4–7)}, [10–3]
Loss	12–8	Jan 2007	Adelaide International, Australia	International	Hard	(Serbia) Novak Djokovic	(South Africa) Wesley Moodie (Australia) Todd Perry	4–6, 6–3, [13–15]
Loss	12–9	Mar 2007	Dubai Championships, United Arab Emirates	Intl. Gold	Hard	(India) Mahesh Bhupathi	(France) Fabrice Santoro (Serbia) Nenad Zimonjić	5–7, 7–6^{(7–3)}, [7–10]
Win	13–9	Feb 2009	Pacific Coast Championships, United States	250 Series	Hard (i)	(Germany) Tommy Haas	(India) Rohan Bopanna (Finland) Jarkko Nieminen	6–2, 6–3
Loss	13–10	Aug 2010	Washington Open, United States	500 Series	Hard	(Czech Republic) Tomáš Berdych	(United States) Mardy Fish (The Bahamas) Mark Knowles	6–4, 6–7^{(7–9)}, [7–10]
Win	14–10	Jan 2012	Australian Open, Australia	Grand Slam	Hard	(India) Leander Paes	(United States) Bob Bryan (United States) Mike Bryan	7–6^{(7–1)}, 6–2
Win	15–10	Mar 2012	Miami Open, United States	Masters 1000	Hard	(India) Leander Paes	(Belarus) Max Mirnyi (Canada) Daniel Nestor	3–6, 6–1, [10–8]
Loss	15–11	Sep 2012	US Open, United States	Grand Slam	Hard	(India) Leander Paes	(United States) Bob Bryan (United States) Mike Bryan	3–6, 4–6
Loss	15–12	Oct 2012	Japan Open, Japan	500 Series	Hard	(India) Leander Paes	(Austria) Alexander Peya (Brazil) Bruno Soares	3–6, 6–7^{(5–7)}
Win	16–12	Oct 2012	Shanghai Masters, China	Masters 1000	Hard	(India) Leander Paes	(India) Mahesh Bhupathi (India) Rohan Bopanna	6–7^{(7–9)}, 6–3, [10–5]
Loss	16–13	Aug 2013	Washington Open, United States	500 Series	Hard	(United States) Mardy Fish	(France) Julien Benneteau (Serbia) Nenad Zimonjić	6–7^{(5–7)}, 5–7
Win	17–13	Sep 2013	US Open, United States	Grand Slam	Hard	(India) Leander Paes	(Austria) Alexander Peya (Brazil) Bruno Soares	6–1, 6–3
Win	18–13	Jul 2015	Colombia Open, Colombia	250 Series	Hard	(France) Édouard Roger-Vasselin	(Croatia) Mate Pavić (New Zealand) Michael Venus	7–5, 6–3
Loss	18–14	Jan 2016	Australian Open, Australia	Grand Slam	Hard	(Canada) Daniel Nestor	(United Kingdom) Jamie Murray (Brazil) Bruno Soares	2–6, 6–4, 7–5
Loss	18–15	Jan 2017	Qatar Open, Qatar	250 Series	Hard	(Canada) Vasek Pospisil	(France) Jérémy Chardy (France) Fabrice Martin	4–6, 6–7^{(3–7)}

== Performance timelines ==
Key
W	F	SF	QF	#R	RR	Q#	P#	DNQ	A	Z#	PO	G	S	B	NMS	NTI	P	NH

(W) winner; (F) finalist; (SF) semifinalist; (QF) quarterfinalist; (#R) rounds 4, 3, 2, 1; (RR) round-robin stage; (Q#) qualification round; (P#) preliminary round; (DNQ) did not qualify; (A) absent; (Z#) Davis/Fed Cup Zonal Group (with number indication) or (PO) play-off; (G) gold, (S) silver or (B) bronze Olympic/Paralympic medal; (NMS) not a Masters tournament; (NTI) not a Tier I tournament; (P) postponed; (NH) not held; (SR) strike rate (events won / competed); (W–L) win–loss record.

As of 2017 Australian Open.

=== Singles ===
Tournament	1997	1998	1999	2000	2001	2002	2003	2004	2005	2006	2007	2008	2009	2010	2011	2012	2013	2014	2015	2016	2017	W–L
Grand Slam tournaments
Australian Open	A	A	A	Q2	A	A	3R	2R	3R	2R	3R	1R	3R	1R	2R	1R	3R	1R	A	2R	2R	15–14
French Open	A	Q3	A	A	A	Q1	2R	1R	3R	3R	2R	4R	3R	A	1R	1R	1R	3R	2R	1R	A	14–13
Wimbledon	A	A	Q2	Q2	Q1	3R	3R	2R	2R	QF	1R	3R	4R	A	1R	3R	2R	2R	1R	1R	A	19–14
US Open	A	A	A	Q1	A	1R	3R	1R	2R	A	2R	3R	4R	1R	2R	1R	1R	1R	1R	1R	A	10–14
Win–loss	0–0	0–0	0–0	0–0	0–0	2–2	7–4	2–4	6–4	7–3	4–4	7–4	10–4	0–2	2–4	2–4	3–4	3–4	1–3	1–4	1–1	58–55
Year-end championship
ATP Finals	Did not qualify											RR	Did not qualify									0–2
National representation
Summer Olympics	Not Held			A	Not Held			A	Not Held			1R	Not Held			1R	Not Held			A	NH	0–2
Davis Cup	A	A	A	A	A	A	1R	1R	A	A	PO	QF	F	SF	PO	W	W	SF	PO	QF	A	15–13
Win–loss	0–0	0–0	0–0	0–0	0–0	0–0	0–2	1–2	0–0	0–0	1–1	2–1	3–1	2–1	1–0	2–4	2–2	1–1	0–0	0–0	0–0	15–15
ATP Masters Series
Indian Wells	A	A	A	A	A	A	1R	1R	2R	2R	2R	3R	2R	2R	1R	3R	A	2R	A	Q2	A	3–11
Miami	A	A	Q2	A	A	A	4R	3R	4R	4R	4R	4R	4R	A	2R	3R	A	2R	A	Q1	A	18–10
Monte Carlo	A	A	A	A	A	A	1R	1R	2R	2R	2R	1R	1R	A	2R	1R	1R	2R	A	A	A	5–11
Rome	A	A	A	A	A	A	3R	2R	QF	3R	2R	SF	3R	A	A	2R	1R	2R	A	Q2	A	17–10
Hamburg	A	A	A	A	A	A	1R	A	2R	F	1R	A	Not Masters Series									6–4
Canada	A	A	A	A	A	3R	1R	A	1R	A	SF	1R	1R	1R	1R	3R	2R	1R	A	3R	A	11–12
Cincinnati	A	A	A	A	A	Q1	1R	Q1	1R	A	2R	1R	3R	1R	3R	3R	2R	1R	A	A	A	8–10
Shanghai	Not Masters Series												QF	1R	2R	QF	A	A	A	A	A	7–4
Madrid	Not Held					A	A	A	QF	A	1R	2R	1R	A	A	2R	2R	1R	A	2R	A	6–8
Paris	A	A	A	A	A	2R	1R	F	SF	A	A	2R	SF	3R	1R	A	A	A	A	A	A	15–8
Win–loss	0–0	0–0	0–0	0–0	0–0	3–2	5–8	8–5	12–9	10–5	9–8	9–8	12–9	2–5	5–7	11–8	3–5	4–7	0–0	3–2	0–0	96–88
Career statistics
	1997	1998	1999	2000	2001	2002	2003	2004	2005	2006	2007	2008	2009	2010	2011	2012	2013	2014	2015	2016	2017	Career
Titles / Finals	0 / 0	0 / 0	0 / 0	0 / 0	0 / 0	0 / 0	0 / 0	0 / 1	0 / 2	1 / 2	1 / 1	0 / 1	2 / 3	0 / 1	1 / 1	0 / 0	0 / 0	0 / 0	0 / 0	0 / 0	0 / 0	5 / 12
Overall win–loss	0–0	0–1	2–4	0–0	0–1	17–14	27–25	30–27	45–26	30–15	27–22	33–23	47–21	18–16	31–24	24–26	16–17	17–18	7–10	10–10	3–2	384–302
Year-end ranking	401	165	169	277	542	63	46	33	20	19	29	26	12	62	28	31	44	68	197	107	354	56%

=== Doubles ===
Tournament	1997	1998	1999	2000	2001	2002	2003	2004	2005	2006	2007	2008	2009	2010	2011	2012	2013	2014	2015	2016	2017	SR	W–L
Grand Slam tournaments
Australian Open	A	A	A	A	A	3R	2R	3R	A	A	QF	A	A	A	A	W	1R	QF	A	F	1R	1 / 9	22–8
French Open	A	A	1R	A	2R	1R	1R	A	A	A	SF	A	A	A	A	A	1R	A	A	3R	A	0 / 7	7–7
Wimbledon	Q2	A	1R	A	1R	2R	2R	3R	A	A	A	A	A	A	A	3R	SF	SF	1R	3R	A	0 / 10	16–9
US Open	A	A	A	A	1R	F	2R	1R	1R	A	A	A	A	A	1R	F	W	3R	3R	1R	A	1 / 11	21–9
Win–loss	0–0	0–0	0–2	0–0	1–3	8–4	3–4	4–3	0–1	0–0	7–2	0–0	0–0	0–0	0–1	13–2	10–3	9–3	2–2	9–4	0–1	2 / 37	66–33
Year-end championship
ATP Finals	Did not qualify															SF	RR	Did not qualify				0 / 2	4–3
National representation
Summer Olympics	Not Held			A	Not Held			A	Not Held			1R	Not Held			2R	Not Held			1R	NH	0 / 3	1–3
Davis Cup	A	A	A	A	A	A	1R	1R	A	A	PO	QF	F	SF	PO	W	W	SF	PO	QF	A	2 / 9	20–5
Win–loss	0–0	0–0	0–0	0–0	0–0	0–0	0–0	2–0	0–0	0–0	1–0	1–2	3–1	2–0	1–0	5–1	2–1	2–1	1–0	1–2	0–0	2 / 12	21–8
ATP Masters Series
Indian Wells	A	A	A	A	A	1R	1R	1R	1R	1R	1R	2R	2R	1R	A	QF	A	QF	A	2R	A	0 / 12	7–12
Miami	A	A	A	A	A	2R	A	1R	A	QF	1R	A	A	A	A	W	A	1R	A	1R	A	1 / 7	6–6
Monte Carlo	A	A	A	A	A	1R	2R	1R	QF	SF	2R	2R	A	A	A	QF	2R	2R	A	2R	A	0 / 11	12–11
Rome	A	A	A	A	A	SF	1R	A	2R	2R	1R	A	A	A	A	2R	QF	QF	A	1R	A	0 / 7	9–7
Hamburg	A	A	A	A	A	SF	1R	A	A	A	2R	A	Not Masters Series									0 / 3	4–3
Canada	A	A	A	A	A	2R	1R	A	A	A	A	A	2R	2R	A	A	2R	2R	A	QF	A	0 / 6	5–6
Cincinnati	A	A	A	A	A	SF	A	A	A	A	A	2R	1R	2R	QF	2R	QF	1R	A	A	A	0 / 6	8–6
Shanghai	Not Masters Series												1R	2R	1R	W	A	A	A	A	A	1 / 4	5–3
Madrid	Not Held					2R	A	A	A	A	A	A	A	A	A	QF	QF	A	A	1R	A	0 / 4	3–4
Paris	A	A	A	A	A	1R	A	A	A	A	A	1R	A	A	A	A	A	A	SF	A	A	0 / 3	3–3
Win–loss	0–0	0–0	0–0	0–0	0–0	10–9	1–5	0–3	3–3	5–4	2–5	3–3	2–3	3–4	2–1	13–5	6–4	5–5	3–1	4–6	0–0	2 / 68	62–61
Career statistics
	1997	1998	1999	2000	2001	2002	2003	2004	2005	2006	2007	2008	2009	2010	2011	2012	2013	2014	2015	2016	2017	Career	
Titles / Finals	0 / 0	0 / 0	1 / 1	0 / 0	3 / 5	1 / 4	1 / 1	3 / 5	2 / 2	1 / 1	0 / 2	0 / 0	1 / 1	0 / 1	0 / 0	3 / 5	1 / 2	0 / 0	1 / 1	0 / 1	0 / 1	18 / 33	
Overall win–loss	0–1	0–0	4–4	0–0	26–11	31–25	14–13	30–16	20–11	11–7	20–12	6–7	10–7	10–8	14–11	42–11	24–14	19–11	13–8	17–17	2–2	313–197	
Year-end ranking	251	155	155	254	38	17	86	33	48	72	36	339	93	92	109	4	9	33	81	38	366	61%	

== Top-10 wins per season ==
Season	1996	1997	1998	1999	2000	2001	2002	2003	2004	2005	2006	2007	2008	2009	2010	2011	2012	2013	2014	2015	2016	2017	Total
Wins	0	0	0	0	0	0	0	4	2	3	1	4	2	5	0	1	1	0	1	0	0	0	24

#	Player	Rank	Event	Surface	Rd	Score
2003
1.	(Czech Republic) Jiří Novák	10	Milan, Italy	Carpet (i)	1R	6–4, 6–3
2.	(Thailand) Paradorn Srichaphan	10	Munich, Germany	Clay	2R	6–3, 6–2
3.	(Germany) Rainer Schüttler	8	Halle, Germany	Grass	2R	6–4, 6–7^{(6–8)}, 6–3
4.	(Germany) Rainer Schüttler	8	Gstaad, Switzerland	Clay	QF	6–4, 6–2
2004
5.	(Germany) Rainer Schüttler	8	Stuttgart, Germany	Clay	2R	6–7^{(6–8)}, 6–3, 6–2
6.	(Russia) Marat Safin	9	Moscow, Russia	Carpet (i)	2R	7–6^{(10–8)}, 4–6, 6–3
2005
7.	(Spain) Carlos Moyá	5	Sydney, Australia	Hard	1R	2–6, 6–4, 6–2
8.	(Argentina) David Nalbandian	10	Rotterdam, Netherlands	Hard (i)	1R	6–2, 4–6, 6–1
9.	(Russia) Nikolay Davydenko	8	Paris, France	Carpet (i)	2R	7–5, 6–4
2006
10.	(Russia) Nikolay Davydenko	6	Rotterdam, Netherlands	Hard (i)	SF	4–6, 6–3, 6–3
2007
11.	(Chile) Fernando González	5	French Open, Paris, France	Clay	1R	6–2, 6–2, 6–4
12.	(United States) James Blake	9	Los Angeles, United States	Hard	F	7–6^{(9–7)}, 5–7, 6–2
13.	(Chile) Fernando González	6	Montreal, Canada	Hard	2R	6–7^{(2–7)}, 7–6^{(7–1)}, 6–4
14.	(Russia) Nikolay Davydenko	5	Montreal, Canada	Hard	QF	6–4, 7–5
2008
15.	(Spain) David Ferrer	5	Rome, Italy	Clay	2R	4–6, 6–2, 6–1
16.	(Switzerland) Roger Federer	1	Rome, Italy	Clay	QF	7–6^{(7–4)}, 7–6^{(9–7)}
2009
17.	(United States) Andy Roddick	6	San Jose, United States	Hard (i)	SF	3–6, 7–6^{(7–5)}, 6–4
18.	(Argentina) Juan Martín del Potro	7	Memphis, United States	Hard (i)	QF	7–6^{(9–7)}, 6–4
19.	(France) Gilles Simon	8	Davis Cup, Ostrava, Czech Republic	Carpet (i)	RR	7–6^{(7–2)}, 6–3, 7–6^{(7–0)}
20.	(United Kingdom) Andy Murray	4	Paris, France	Hard (i)	3R	1–6, 6–3, 6–4
21.	(Argentina) Juan Martín del Potro	5	Paris, France	Hard (i)	QF	4–0 retired
2011
22.	(France) Gaël Monfils	7	Washington, United States	Hard	F	6–4, 6–4
2012
23.	(Argentina) Juan Martín del Potro	8	Toronto, Canada	Hard	2R	6–4, 7–6^{(7–5)}
2014
24.	(United Kingdom) Andy Murray	5	Queen's Club, United Kingdom	Grass	3R	7–6^{(12–10)}, 6–2
