= 2000 CA-TennisTrophy – Singles =

Singles
- 2000 CA-TennisTrophy

Final
- Champion: (United Kingdom) Tim Henman
- Runner-up: (Germany) Tommy Haas
- Score: 6–4, 6–4, 6–4

Details
- Draw: 32 (3WC/4Q/1LL)
- Seeds: 8

Events
Singles	Doubles
← 1999 ·	Vienna Open	· 2001 →

Tim Henman won the title, defeating Tommy Haas in the final, 6–4, 6–4, 6–4. He saved two match points en route to the title, in the semifinals against Roger Federer.

Greg Rusedski was the defending champion, but lost in the second round to Fernando Vicente.

== Seeds ==
1. (Russia) Marat Safin (first round)
2. (Sweden) Magnus Norman (first round)
3. (Sweden) Thomas Enqvist (first round)
4. (Russia) Yevgeny Kafelnikov (first round)
5. (Spain) Àlex Corretja (first round)
6. (United Kingdom) Tim Henman (champion)
7. (Spain) Juan Carlos Ferrero (first round)
8. (France) Cédric Pioline (semifinals)

== Draw ==
=== Key ===
- Q = Qualifier
- WC = Wild card
- LL = Lucky loser
- Alt = Alternate
- SE = Special exempt
- PR = Protected ranking
- ITF = ITF entry
- JE = Junior exempt
- w/o = Walkover
- r = Retired
- d = Defaulted
- SR = Special ranking

=== Final ===
Semifinals
8	(France) Cédric Pioline	7^{7}	2	2
WC	(Germany) Tommy Haas	6^{5}	6	6
6	(United Kingdom) Tim Henman	2	7^{7}	6
(Switzerland) Roger Federer	6	6^{4}	3

Final
WC	(Germany) Tommy Haas	4	4	4
2	(United Kingdom) Tim Henman	6	6	6

=== Section 1 ===
First round
1	(Russia) M Safin	7	3	6^{5}
(France) N Escudé	5	6	7^{7}
(Austria) S Koubek	6	6
LL	(France) C Saulnier	2	0
Q	(Sweden) T Johansson	3	3
(Romania) A Pavel	6	6
(Austria) Z Mlynarik	3	2
8	(France) C Pioline	6	6
3	(Sweden) T Enqvist	3^{r}
Q	(Czech Republic) S Doseděl	5
Q	(Italy) G Pozzi	3	4
(France) J Golmard	6	6
(United States) J Gambill	4	0
(France) A Clement	6	6
WC	(Germany) T Haas	6	6
5	(Spain) À Corretja	1	0

Second round
(France) N Escudé	6	3	2
(Austria) S Koubek	4	6	6
(Romania) A Pavel	6^{5}	6^{3}
8	(France) C Pioline	7^{7}	7^{7}
Q	(Czech Republic) S Doseděl	6	5	4
(France) J Golmard	2	7	6
(France) A Clement	2	1
WC	(Germany) T Haas	6	6

Quarterfinals
(Austria) S Koubek	3	3
8	(France) C Pioline	6	6
(France) J Golmard	6	3	1
WC	(Germany) T Haas	2	6	6

Semifinals
8	(France) C Pioline	7^{7}	2	2
WC	(Germany) T Haas	6^{5}	6	6

=== Section 2 ===
First round
6	(United Kingdom) T Henman	6	6
(Switzerland) M Rosset	3	1
(Spain) F Clavet	4	6	4
(France) F Santoro	6	2	6
(Spain) F Vicente	1	6	6
(France) S Grosjean	6	4	2
(United Kingdom) G Rusedski	6	6^{3}	6
4	(Russia) Y Kafelnikov	4	7^{7}	3
7	(Spain) JC Ferrero	4	4
(Netherlands) R Krajicek	6	6
(Czech Republic) J Novák	1	4
(Sweden) A Vinciguerra	6	6
Q	(Belarus) M Mirnyi	7	6
WC	(France) A Di Pasquale	5	3
(Switzerland) R Federer	4	7^{7}	6
2	(Sweden) M Norman	6	6^{4}	4

Second round
6	(United Kingdom) T Henman	6	6
(France) F Santoro	3	2
(Spain) F Vicente	6	6^{4}	6
(United Kingdom) G Rusedski	2	7^{7}	2
(Netherlands) R Krajicek	7^{7}	6
(Sweden) A Vinciguerra	6^{3}	3
Q	(Belarus) M Mirnyi	3	3
(Switzerland) R Federer	6	6

Quarterfinals
6	(United Kingdom) T Henman	6	7^{7}
(Spain) F Vicente	4	6^{3}
(Netherlands) R Krajicek	4	3
(Switzerland) R Federer	6	6

Semifinals
6	(United Kingdom) T Henman	2	7^{7}	6
(Switzerland) R Federer	6	6^{4}	3

== Qualifying ==
=== Qualifying seeds ===
1. (Belarus) Max Mirnyi (qualified)
2. (Italy) Gianluca Pozzi (qualified)
3. (Sweden) Thomas Johansson (qualified)
4. (Czech Republic) Sláva Doseděl (qualified)
5. (Czech Republic) ~~Martin Damm~~ (withdrew)
6. (Germany) Alexander Popp (qualifying competition)
7. (France) Julien Boutter (first round)
8. (France) Cyril Saulnier (first round, lucky loser)

=== Qualifiers ===
1. (Belarus) Max Mirnyi
2. (Italy) Gianluca Pozzi
3. (Sweden) Thomas Johansson
4. (Czech Republic) Sláva Doseděl

=== Lucky loser ===
1. (France) Cyril Saulnier

=== Qualifying draw ===
==== First qualifier ====
First round
1	(Belarus) Max Mirnyi	6	6
(South Africa) Neville Godwin	4	1
(Federal Republic of Yugoslavia) Nenad Zimonjić	6	6
7/WC	(France) Julien Boutter	3	3

Qualifying competition
1	(Belarus) Max Mirnyi	7^{7}	6
(Federal Republic of Yugoslavia) Nenad Zimonjić	6^{5}	1

==== Second qualifier ====
First round
2	(Italy) Gianluca Pozzi	6	6
(Austria) Herbert Wiltschnig	2	3
(France) Sébastien de Chaunac	6^{5}	7	6
8	(France) Cyril Saulnier	7^{7}	5	3

Qualifying competition
2	(Italy) Gianluca Pozzi	1	7	6
(France) Sébastien de Chaunac	6	5	3

==== Third qualifier ====
First round
3	(Sweden) Thomas Johansson	7^{7}	6
WC	(Austria) Alexander Peya	6^{5}	4
(Czech Republic) Radomír Vašek	2	5
6	(Germany) Alexander Popp	6	7

Qualifying competition
3	(Sweden) Thomas Johansson	6	6
6	(Germany) Alexander Popp	4	2

==== Fourth qualifier ====
First round
4	(Czech Republic) Sláva Doseděl	6^{6}	6	6
(Switzerland) Ivo Heuberger	7^{8}	0	2
(France) Lionel Roux	2	2
Alt	(Italy) Diego Nargiso	6	6

Qualifying competition
4	(Czech Republic) Sláva Doseděl	7^{7}	6^{2}	7
Alt	(Italy) Diego Nargiso	6^{5}	7^{7}	5
