= 2001 CA-TennisTrophy – Singles =

Singles
- 2001 CA-TennisTrophy

Final
- Champion: (Germany) Tommy Haas
- Runner-up: (Argentina) Guillermo Cañas
- Score: 6–2, 7–6^{(8–6)}, 6–4

Details
- Draw: 32 (3WC/4Q/1LL/1SE)
- Seeds: 8

Events
Singles	Doubles
← 2000 ·	Vienna Open	· 2002 →

Tim Henman was the defending champion but lost in the second round to Guillermo Cañas.

Tommy Haas won in the final 6–2, 7–6^{(8–6)}, 6–4 against Cañas.

== Seeds ==
1. (Russia) Yevgeny Kafelnikov (first round)
2. (United Kingdom) Tim Henman (second round)
3. (Spain) Àlex Corretja (first round)
4. (Switzerland) Roger Federer (quarterfinals)
5. (Croatia) Goran Ivanišević (first round)
6. (Germany) Tommy Haas (champion)
7. (France) Fabrice Santoro (first round)
8. (Spain) Carlos Moyá (first round)

== Draw ==
=== Key ===
- Q = Qualifier
- WC = Wild card
- LL = Lucky loser
- Alt = Alternate
- SE = Special exempt
- PR = Protected ranking
- ITF = ITF entry
- JE = Junior exempt
- w/o = Walkover
- r = Retired
- d = Defaulted
- SR = Special ranking

=== Final ===
Semifinals
6	(Germany) Tommy Haas	6^{4}	6	7^{7}
(Sweden) Thomas Enqvist	7^{7}	2	6^{4}
WC	(Austria) Stefan Koubek	2	5
(Argentina) Guillermo Cañas	6	7

Final
6	(Germany) Tommy Haas	6	7^{8}	6
(Argentina) Guillermo Cañas	2	6^{6}	4

=== Section 1 ===
First round
1	(Russia) Y Kafelnikov	6^{6}	3
(Czech Republic) B Ulihrach	7^{8}	6
(Chile) M Ríos	6^{4}	6	2
(Spain) T Robredo	7^{7}	1	6
(Czech Republic) J Novák	6	6
(United Kingdom) G Rusedski	2	2
(France) J Golmard	0^{r}
6	(Germany) T Haas	3
3	(Spain) À Corretja	6	1	4
(Sweden) A Vinciguerra	3	6	6
Q	(Romania) A Voinea	4	6	3
WC	(Austria) J Knowle	6	3	1^{r}
(Spain) A Martín	3	6	6
(Australia) M Philippoussis	6	3	1
(Sweden) T Enqvist	2	6	7^{7}
8	(Spain) C Moyá	6	3	6^{3}

Second round
(Czech Republic) B Ulihrach	1	6	6
(Spain) T Robredo	6	3	4
(Czech Republic) J Novák	6^{3}	3
6	(Germany) T Haas	7^{7}	6
(Sweden) A Vinciguerra	6	7
Q	(Romania) A Voinea	4	5
(Spain) A Martín	2	5
(Sweden) T Enqvist	6	7

Quarterfinals
(Czech Republic) B Ulihrach	1	4
6	(Germany) T Haas	6	6
(Sweden) A Vinciguerra	1	4
(Sweden) T Enqvist	6	6

Semifinals
6	(Germany) T Haas	6^{4}	6	7^{7}
(Sweden) T Enqvist	7^{7}	2	6^{4}

=== Section 2 ===
First round
5	(Croatia) G Ivanišević	7^{7}	3	3
(United States) M Chang	6^{5}	6	6
Q	(Czech Republic) J Vaněk	6	3	2
WC	(Austria) S Koubek	4	6	6
(Spain) A Costa	6	3	6
WC	(Austria) M Hipfl	3	6	4
LL	(Chile) N Massú	6	6^{8}	4
4	(Switzerland) R Federer	4	7^{10}	6
7	(France) F Santoro	7^{10}	4	4
Q	(Austria) J Melzer	6^{8}	6	6
(Slovakia) D Hrbatý	6^{6}	5
SE	(Switzerland) M Kratochvil	7^{8}	7
(Argentina) G Cañas	7^{8}	7
Q	(Russia) N Davydenko	6^{6}	5
(South Africa) W Ferreira	4	0
2	(United Kingdom) T Henman	6	6

Second round
(United States) M Chang	3	6	5
WC	(Austria) S Koubek	6	3	7
(Spain) A Costa	6^{1}	2
4	(Switzerland) R Federer	7^{7}	6
Q	(Austria) J Melzer	6^{4}	6^{5}
SE	(Switzerland) M Kratochvil	7^{7}	7^{7}
(Argentina) G Cañas	3	7^{7}	7^{7}
2	(United Kingdom) T Henman	6	6^{4}	6^{5}

Quarterfinals
WC	(Austria) S Koubek	7^{7}	7
4	(Switzerland) R Federer	6^{3}	5
SE	(Switzerland) M Kratochvil	4	6	2
(Argentina) G Cañas	6	3	6

Semifinals
WC	(Austria) S Koubek	2	5
(Argentina) G Cañas	6	7

== Qualifying ==
=== Qualifying seeds ===
1. (Czech Republic) ~~Jan Vacek~~ (withdrew)
2. (Russia) Andrei Stoliarov (first round)
3. (Chile) Nicolás Massú (first round, lucky loser)
4. (Belgium) Christophe Rochus (first round)
5. (Czech Republic) Jiří Vaněk (qualified)
6. (Russia) Nikolay Davydenko (qualified)
7. (Romania) Adrian Voinea (qualified)
8. (Switzerland) George Bastl (qualifying competition)

=== Qualifiers ===
1. (Czech Republic) Jiří Vaněk
2. (Russia) Nikolay Davydenko
3. (Romania) Adrian Voinea
4. (Austria) Jürgen Melzer

=== Lucky loser ===
1. (Chile) Nicolás Massú (replaced (United States) Jan-Michael Gambill)

=== Special exempt ===
1. (Switzerland) Michel Kratochvil (runner-up at Tokyo)

=== Qualifying draws ===
==== First qualifier ====
First round
Alt	(Czech Republic) Leoš Friedl	6^{11}	6	2
(Italy) Renzo Furlan	7^{13}	4	6
WC	(Slovakia) Ján Krošlák	2	4
5	(Czech Republic) Jiří Vaněk	6	6

Qualifying competition
(Italy) Renzo Furlan	4	2
5	(Czech Republic) Jiří Vaněk	6	6

==== Second qualifier ====
First round
2	(Russia) Andrei Stoliarov	6^{2}	4
(Zimbabwe) Wayne Black	7^{7}	6
WC	(Israel) Dudi Sela	3	1
6	(Russia) Nikolay Davydenko	6	6

Qualifying competition
(Zimbabwe) Wayne Black	1	5
6	(Russia) Nikolay Davydenko	6	7

==== Third qualifier ====
First round
3	(Chile) Nicolás Massú	6	6
WC	(Austria) Markus Kanellos	1	4
(Austria) Zbynek Mlynarik	6^{8}	6^{1}
7	(Romania) Adrian Voinea	7^{10}	7^{7}

Qualifying competition
3	(Chile) Nicolás Massú	3	6^{4}
7	(Romania) Adrian Voinea	6	7^{7}

==== Fourth qualifier ====
First round
4	(Belgium) Christophe Rochus	2	3
(Austria) Jürgen Melzer	6	6
(Austria) Alexander Peya	1	1
8	(Switzerland) George Bastl	6	6

Qualifying competition
(Austria) Jürgen Melzer	4	6	6
8	(Switzerland) George Bastl	6	3	4
