= 2001 Stuttgart Masters – Singles =

Singles
- 2001 Stuttgart Masters
- 2000 Champion: (South Africa) Wayne Ferreira

Final
- Champion: (Germany) Tommy Haas
- Runner-up: (Belarus) Max Mirnyi
- Score: 6–2, 6–2, 6–2

Events
Singles	Doubles
← 2000 ·	Stuttgart Masters	· 2002 →

Tommy Haas defeated Max Mirnyi in the final, 6–2, 6–2, 6–2 to win the singles tennis title at the 2001 Eurocard Open.

Wayne Ferreira was the defending champion, but lost in the quarterfinals to Lleyton Hewitt.

== Seeds ==
All seeds receive a bye into the second round.

1. (Brazil) Gustavo Kuerten (second round)
2. (United States) Andre Agassi (second round)
3. (Australia) Lleyton Hewitt (semifinals)
4. (Spain) Juan Carlos Ferrero (second round)
5. (Russia) Yevgeny Kafelnikov (semifinals)
6. (Russia) Marat Safin (second round)
7. (United Kingdom) Tim Henman (quarterfinals)
8. (France) Sébastien Grosjean (third round)
9. (United States) Pete Sampras (quarterfinals)
10. (Spain) Àlex Corretja (second round)
11. (Switzerland) Roger Federer (second round)
12. (France) Arnaud Clément (second round)
13. (Croatia) Goran Ivanišević (third round)
14. (United States) Andy Roddick (third round)
15. (Germany) Tommy Haas (champion)
16. (Sweden) Thomas Johansson (second round)

== Draw ==
Key

- Q = Qualifier
- WC = Wild card
- LL = Lucky loser
- Alt = Alternate
- ITF = ITF entry
- PR = Protected ranking
- SR = Special ranking
- SE = Special exempt
- JE = Junior exempt
- JR = Junior Accelerator Programme entrant
- CO = College Accelerator Programme entrant
- NG = Next Gen Accelerator Program entrant
- w/o = Walkover
- r = Retired
- d = Defaulted

=== Finals ===
Quarterfinals
Q	(Belarus) Max Mirnyi	6	6
9	(United States) Pete Sampras	4	3
(Sweden) Thomas Enqvist	5	4
5	(Russia) Yevgeny Kafelnikov	7	6
(South Africa) Wayne Ferreira	7^{7}	3	2
3	(Australia) Lleyton Hewitt	6^{5}	6	6
7	(United Kingdom) Tim Henman	6	3	4
15	(Germany) Tommy Haas	2	6	6

Semifinals
Q	(Belarus) Max Mirnyi	7^{7}	6
5	(Russia) Yevgeny Kafelnikov	6^{3}	3
3	(Australia) Lleyton Hewitt	6	4	5
15	(Germany) Tommy Haas	3	6	7

Final
Q	(Belarus) Max Mirnyi	2	2	2
15	(Germany) Tommy Haas	6	6	6

=== Top half ===
==== Section 1 ====
First round
Q	(Belgium) O Rochus	6^{6}	2
Q	(Belarus) M Mirnyi	7^{8}	6
(Australia) M Philippoussis	6	3	6
(Spain) A Martín	3	6	3
SE	(Austria) S Koubek	4	7^{7}	6
(Spain) T Robredo	6	6^{5}	3
(France) F Santoro	6	1	2
WC	(Chile) M Ríos	4	6	6

Second round
1	(Brazil) G Kuerten	6	6^{6}	4
Q	(Belarus) M Mirnyi	4	7^{8}	6
(Australia) M Philippoussis	6^{1}	6	3
13	(Croatia) G Ivanišević	7^{7}	3	6
9	(United States) P Sampras	6	7^{7}
SE	(Austria) S Koubek	3	6^{5}
WC	(Chile) M Ríos	7^{7}	6
6	(Russia) M Safin	6^{4}	3

Third round
Q	(Belarus) M Mirnyi	4	7^{8}	7^{10}
13	(Croatia) G Ivanišević	6	6^{6}	6^{8}
9	(United States) P Sampras	4	7^{7}	6
WC	(Chile) M Ríos	6	6^{3}	4

Quarterfinals
Q	(Belarus) M Mirnyi	6	6
9	(United States) P Sampras	4	2

==== Section 2 ====
First round
(France) N Escudé	5	3
(Sweden) T Enqvist	7	6
(United Kingdom) G Rusedski	3	4
Q	(France) J Boutter	6	6
(Czech Republic) J Novák	6	6
Q	(Chile) N Massú	3	2
(Romania) A Pavel	7	7
(United States) J-M Gambill	5	5

Second round
4	(Spain) J C Ferrero	6	3	6^{4}
(Sweden) T Enqvist	4	6	7^{7}
Q	(France) J Boutter	6^{3}	6^{5}
14	(United States) A Roddick	7^{7}	7^{7}
10	(Spain) À Corretja	6	2	2
(Czech Republic) J Novák	3	6	6
(Romania) A Pavel	6	6^{4}	3
5	(Russia) Y Kafelnikov	4	7^{7}	6

Third round
(Sweden) T Enqvist	6	6^{6}	7^{7}
14	(United States) A Roddick	3	7^{8}	6^{5}
(Czech Republic) J Novák	3	4
5	(Russia) Y Kafelnikov	6	6

Quarterfinals
(Sweden) T Enqvist	5	4
5	(Russia) Y Kafelnikov	7	6

=== Bottom half ===
==== Section 3 ====
First round
(Spain) Á Costa	3	6	7^{8}
(Germany) N Kiefer	6	0	6^{6}
(South Africa) W Ferreira	6	2	6
(Slovakia) D Hrbatý	4	6	4
Q	(Spain) F Clavet	3	2
(Argentina) G Cañas	6	6
(Sweden) A Vinciguerra	3	2
(Czech Republic) B Ulihrach	6	6

Second round
8	(France) S Grosjean	6	6
(Spain) Á Costa	3	4
(South Africa) W Ferreira	7^{7}	3	6
11	(Switzerland) R Federer	6^{1}	6	2
16	(Sweden) T Johansson	6	3	5
(Argentina) G Cañas	3	6	7
(Czech Republic) B Ulihrach	6	3	4
3	(Australia) L Hewitt	3	6	6

Third round
8	(France) S Grosjean	3	6	6^{7}
(South Africa) W Ferreira	6	3	7^{9}
(Argentina) G Cañas	6	1	4
3	(Australia) L Hewitt	3	6	6

Quarterfinals
(South Africa) W Ferreira	7^{7}	3	2
3	(Australia) L Hewitt	6^{5}	6	6

==== Section 4 ====
First round
(Spain) A Portas	3	6	3
Q	(Germany) A Pretzsch	6	4	6
(Ecuador) N Lapentti	4	6	6
(Spain) C Moyá	6	1	3
(Netherlands) S Schalken	6	6
WC	(Germany) D Prinosil	2	4
WC	(Germany) R Schüttler	4	2
(Morocco) H Arazi	6	6

Second round
7	(United Kingdom) T Henman	6	6
Q	(Germany) A Pretzsch	3	0
(Ecuador) N Lapentti	4	6	7
12	(France) A Clément	6	2	5
15	(Germany) T Haas	4	7^{7}	6
(Netherlands) S Schalken	6	6^{2}	2
(Morocco) H Arazi	7^{7}	7
2	(United States) A Agassi	6^{4}	5

Third round
7	(United Kingdom) T Henman	7^{7}	6
(Ecuador) N Lapentti	6^{4}	2
15	(Germany) T Haas	4	6	7^{7}
(Morocco) H Arazi	6	3	6^{1}

Quarterfinals
7	(United Kingdom) T Henman	6	3	4
15	(Germany) T Haas	2	6	6

== Qualifying ==
=== Seeds ===
1. (Spain) Félix Mantilla (first round)
2. (Spain) Fernando Vicente (first round)
3. (Russia) Nikolay Davydenko (first round)
4. (Belarus) Max Mirnyi (qualified)
5. (Italy) Andrea Gaudenzi (first round)
6. (Argentina) Gastón Gaudio (first round)
7. (Spain) Francisco Clavet (qualified)
8. (Spain) Galo Blanco (first round)
9. (Russia) Mikhail Youzhny (qualifying competition)
10. (United States) Michael Chang (first round)
11. (France) Antony Dupuis (qualifying competition)
12. (France) Julien Boutter (qualified)

=== Qualifiers ===
1. (France) Julien Boutter
2. (Belgium) Olivier Rochus
3. (Spain) Francisco Clavet
4. (Belarus) Max Mirnyi
5. (Chile) Nicolás Massú
6. (Germany) Axel Pretzsch

=== Draw ===
==== First qualifier ====
First round
1	(Spain) Félix Mantilla	1	6	6^{6}
(Germany) Lars Burgsmüller	6	4	7^{8}
WC	(Switzerland) Ivo Heuberger	1	2
12	(France) Julien Boutter	6	6

Qualifying competition
(Germany) Lars Burgsmüller	1	4
12	(France) Julien Boutter	6	6

==== Second qualifier ====
First round
2	(Spain) Fernando Vicente	0	3
WC	(Romania) Gabriel Trifu	6	6
(Belgium) Olivier Rochus	4	7^{7}	6
10	(United States) Michael Chang	6	6^{4}	4

Qualifying competition
WC	(Romania) Gabriel Trifu	1	0
(Belgium) Olivier Rochus	6	6

==== Third qualifier ====
First round
3/Alt	(Russia) Nikolay Davydenko	4	4
(Spain) Jacobo Díaz	6	6
(Austria) Markus Hipfl	2	5
7	(Spain) Francisco Clavet	6	7

Qualifying competition
(Spain) Jacobo Díaz	0	2
7	(Spain) Francisco Clavet	6	6

==== Fourth qualifier ====
First round
4	(Belarus) Max Mirnyi	6	4	7^{8}
(Czech Republic) Jan Vacek	4	6	6^{6}
(Belgium) Christophe Rochus	5	6	0
9	(Russia) Mikhail Youzhny	7	4	6

Qualifying competition
4	(Belarus) Max Mirnyi	6	6^{5}	6
9	(Russia) Mikhail Youzhny	3	7^{7}	3

==== Fifth qualifier ====
First round
5	(Italy) Andrea Gaudenzi	6	1	5
(Chile) Nicolás Massú	3	6	7
(Denmark) Kristian Pless	2	2
11	(France) Antony Dupuis	6	6

Qualifying competition
(Chile) Nicolás Massú	7^{7}	6
11	(France) Antony Dupuis	6^{4}	4

==== Sixth qualifier ====
First round
6	(Argentina) Gastón Gaudio	6	3	3
WC	(France) Michaël Llodra	1	6	6
WC	(Germany) Axel Pretzsch	7	6
8	(Spain) Galo Blanco	5	2

Qualifying competition
WC	(France) Michaël Llodra	4	7^{11}	6^{5}
WC	(Germany) Axel Pretzsch	6	6^{9}	7^{7}
