= 2001 CA-TennisTrophy =

- Date: 8–14 October
- Edition: 27th
- Category: International Series Gold
- Draw: 32S / 16D
- Prize money: $700,000
- Surface: Hard / indoor
- Location: Vienna, Austria
- Venue: Wiener Stadthalle

Champions

Singles
- (Germany) Tommy Haas

Doubles
- (Czech Republic) Martin Damm / (Czech Republic) Radek Štěpánek
- Vienna Open

The 2001 CA-TennisTrophy was a men's tennis tournament played on indoor hard courts at the Wiener Stadthalle in Vienna, Austria, and was part of the International Series Gold of the 2001 ATP Tour. It was the 27th edition and took place from 8 October through 14 October 2001. Sixth-seeded Tommy Haas won the singles title.

== Finals ==
=== Singles ===
(Germany) Tommy Haas defeated (Argentina) Guillermo Cañas 6–2, 7–6^{(8–6)}, 6–4

- It was Haas' 3rd title of the year and the 4th of his career.

=== Doubles ===
(Czech Republic) Martin Damm / (Czech Republic) Radek Štěpánek defeated (Czech Republic) Jiří Novák / (Czech Republic) David Rikl 6–3, 6–2

- It was Damm's 2nd title of the year and the 20th of his career. It was Štěpánek's 3rd title of the year and the 4th of his career.
