= 2001 Stuttgart Masters – Doubles =

Doubles
- 2001 Stuttgart Masters
- 2000 Champions: (Czech Republic) Jiří Novák (Czech Republic) David Rikl

Final
- Champions: (Belarus) Max Mirnyi (Australia) Sandon Stolle
- Runners-up: (South Africa) Ellis Ferreira (United States) Jeff Tarango
- Score: 7–6^{(7–0)}, 7–6^{(7–4)}

Events
Singles	Doubles
← 2000 ·	Stuttgart Masters	· 2002 →

Jiří Novák and David Rikl were the defending champions but lost in the semifinals to Ellis Ferreira and Jeff Tarango.

Max Mirnyi and Sandon Stolle won in the final 7–6^{(7–0)}, 7–6^{(7–4)} against Ferreira and Tarango.

== Seeds ==
All seeds receive a bye into the second round.

1. (United States) Donald Johnson / (United States) Jared Palmer (second round)
2. (Czech Republic) Jiří Novák / (Czech Republic) David Rikl (semifinals)
3. (India) Mahesh Bhupathi / (India) Leander Paes (quarterfinals)
4. (Belarus) Max Mirnyi / (Australia) Sandon Stolle (champions)
5. (Zimbabwe) Wayne Black / (Zimbabwe) Kevin Ullyett (second round)
6. (Canada) Daniel Nestor / (Federal Republic of Yugoslavia) Nenad Zimonjić (quarterfinals)
7. (Czech Republic) Petr Pála / (Czech Republic) Pavel Vízner (second round)
8. (United States) Bob Bryan / (United States) Mike Bryan (second round)

== Draw ==
Key

- Q = Qualifier
- WC = Wild card
- LL = Lucky loser
- Alt = Alternate
- ITF = ITF entry
- PR = Protected ranking
- SR = Special ranking
- SE = Special exempt
- JE = Junior exempt
- JR = Junior Accelerator Programme entrant
- CO = College Accelerator Programme entrant
- NG = Next Gen Accelerator Program entrant
- w/o = Walkover
- r = Retired
- d = Defaulted

=== Finals ===
Semifinals

Final

- (Czech Republic) Martin Damm
- (Germany) David Prinosil
3
6^{5}

4
- (Belarus) Max Mirnyi
- (Australia) Sandon Stolle
6
7^{7}

4
- (Belarus) Max Mirnyi
- (Australia) Sandon Stolle
7^{7}
7^{7}

- (South Africa) Ellis Ferreira
- (United States) Jeff Tarango
6^{0}
6^{4}

- (South Africa) Ellis Ferreira
- (United States) Jeff Tarango
7^{8}
6

2
- (Czech Republic) Jiří Novák
- (Czech Republic) David Rikl
6^{6}
4

=== Top half ===
First round

Second round

Quarterfinals

Semifinals

1
- (United States) D Johnson
- (United States) J Palmer
4
4

- (Australia) J Eagle
- (Australia) A Florent
6
6^{8}
0

- (Czech Republic) M Damm
- (Germany) D Prinosil
6
6

- (Czech Republic) M Damm
- (Germany) D Prinosil
3
7^{10}
6

- (Czech Republic) M Damm
- (Germany) D Prinosil
6
6

WC
- (Romania) A Pavel
- (Romania) G Trifu
7^{8}
6^{5}
4

- (South Africa) W Ferreira
- (Russia) Y Kafelnikov
3
3

- (South Africa) W Ferreira
- (Russia) Y Kafelnikov
6^{6}
7^{7}
6

- (South Africa) W Ferreira
- (Russia) Y Kafelnikov
6
6

5
- (Zimbabwe) W Black
- (Zimbabwe) K Ullyett
3
4

- (Czech Republic) M Damm
- (Germany) D Prinosil
3
6^{5}

4
- (Belarus) M Mirnyi
- (Australia) S Stolle
6
7^{7}

4
- (Belarus) M Mirnyi
- (Australia) S Stolle
7^{10}
7^{7}

WC
- (Spain) À Corretja
- (Spain) C Moyá
7^{7}
6

WC
- (Spain) À Corretja
- (Spain) C Moyá
6^{8}
6^{3}

WC
- (Croatia) G Ivanišević
- (Croatia) M Tudor
6^{4}
1

4
- (Belarus) M Mirnyi
- (Australia) S Stolle
6
7^{16}

- (Czech Republic) C Suk
- (Belgium) T Vanhoudt
7
4
4

- (Australia) W Arthurs
- (Australia) M Hill
1
6^{14}

- (Australia) W Arthurs
- (Australia) M Hill
5
6
6

- (Australia) W Arthurs
- (Australia) M Hill
3
6
6

8
- (United States) B Bryan
- (United States) M Bryan
6
4
4

=== Bottom half ===
First round

Second round

Quarterfinals

Semifinals

7
- (Czech Republic) P Pála
- (Czech Republic) P Vízner
1
3

- (The Bahamas) M Knowles
- (United States) B MacPhie
3
4

- (South Africa) E Ferreira
- (United States) J Tarango
6
6

- (South Africa) E Ferreira
- (United States) J Tarango
6
6

- (South Africa) E Ferreira
- (United States) J Tarango
5
7^{7}
6

WC
- (Ecuador) N Lapentti
- (Russia) M Youzhny
3
1

3
- (India) M Bhupathi
- (India) L Paes
7
6^{4}
3

- (South Africa) D Adams
- (Argentina) L Arnold
6
6

- (South Africa) D Adams
- (Argentina) L Arnold
5
3

3
- (India) M Bhupathi
- (India) L Paes
7
6

- (South Africa) E Ferreira
- (United States) J Tarango
7^{8}
6

2
- (Czech Republic) J Novák
- (Czech Republic) D Rikl
6^{6}
4

6
(Canada) D Nestor
(Federal Republic of Yugoslavia) N Zimonjić
7^{7}
6

WC
- (United States) A Agassi
- (Slovakia) D Hrbatý
7
6

WC
- (United States) A Agassi
- (Slovakia) D Hrbatý
6^{3}
3

WC
- (Germany) T Haas
- (United States) G Weiner
5
3

6
(Canada) D Nestor
(Federal Republic of Yugoslavia) N Zimonjić
6^{6}
1

- (Netherlands) P Haarhuis
- (Netherlands) S Schalken
6
7

2
- (Czech Republic) J Novák
- (Czech Republic) D Rikl
7^{8}
6

Alt
- (Spain) A Portas
- (Spain) T Robredo
4
5

- (Netherlands) P Haarhuis
- (Netherlands) S Schalken
6^{6}
2

2
- (Czech Republic) J Novák
- (Czech Republic) D Rikl
7^{8}
6
