= 2001 Stuttgart Masters =

- Date: 15 – 22 October
- Edition: 13th
- Category: Tennis Masters Series
- Location: Stuttgart, Germany
- Venue: Hanns-Martin-Schleyer-Halle

Champions

Singles
- (Germany) Tommy Haas

Doubles
- (Belarus) Max Mirnyi / (Australia) Sandon Stolle
← 2000 ·	Stuttgart Masters	· 2002 →

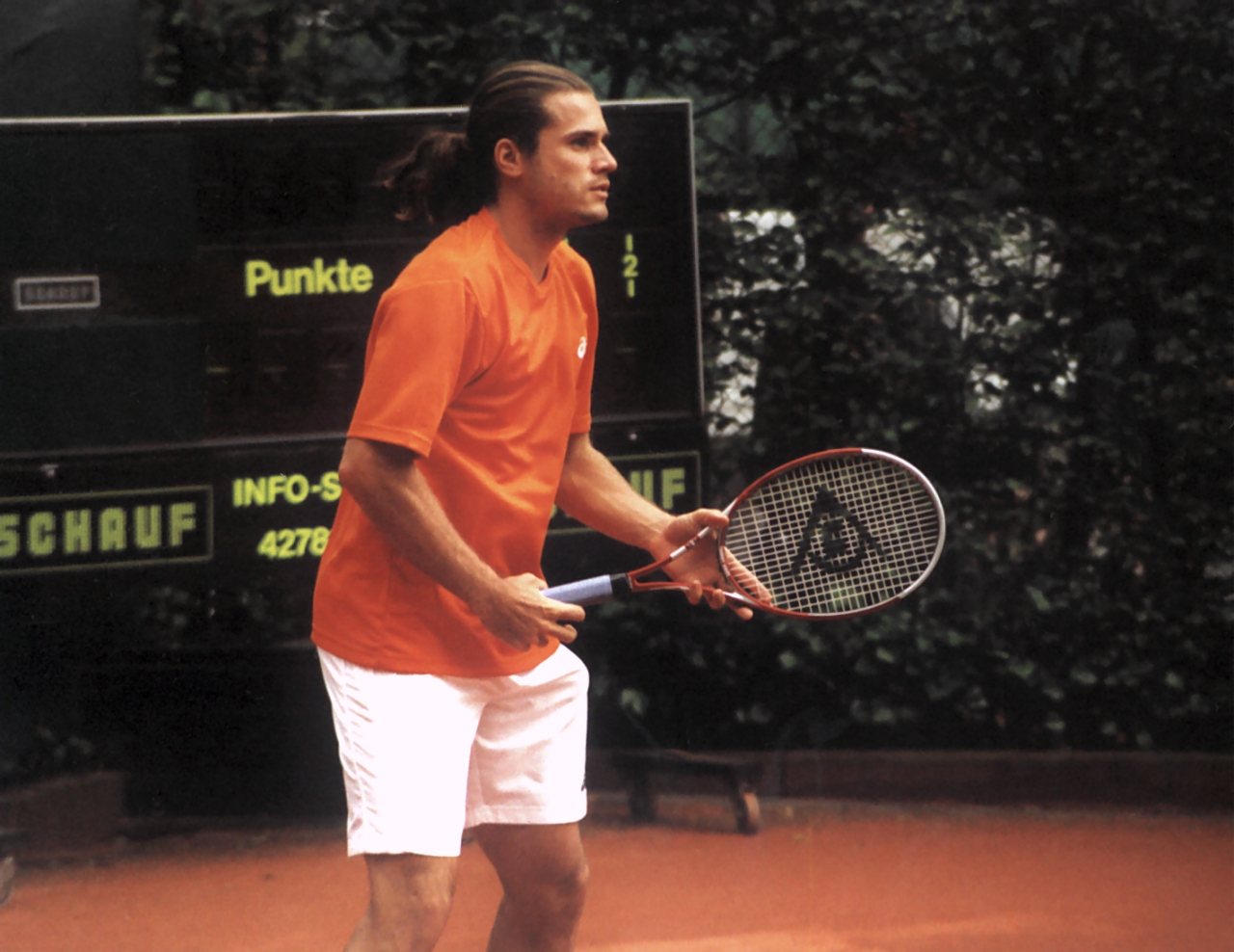
Tommy Haas made and won his first Tennis Masters Series final in Stuttgart, eventually finishing the 2001 season as ATP No. 8.

The 2001 Stuttgart Masters was a men's tennis tournament played on indoor hard courts. It was the 13th edition of the event known that year as the Tennis Masters Series–Stuttgart or Stuttgart Masters, and was part of the Tennis Masters Series events of the 2001 ATP Tour. It took place at the Hanns-Martin-Schleyer-Halle in Stuttgart, Germany, from 15 to 22 October 2001. Tommy Haas won the singles title.

== Finals ==
=== Singles ===
(Germany) Tommy Haas defeated (Belarus) Max Mirnyi, 6–2, 6–2, 6–2

- It was Haas' fourth singles title of the year, and the fifth of his career.

=== Doubles ===
(Belarus) Max Mirnyi / (Australia) Sandon Stolle defeated (South Africa) Ellis Ferreira / (United States) Jeff Tarango, 7–6^{(7–0)}, 7–6^{(7–4)}

- It was Mirnyi's second doubles title of the year, and the 10th of his career.
- It was Stolle's fifth doubles title of the year, and the 21st of his career.
