= 2002 CA-TennisTrophy =

- Date: 7–13 October
- Edition: 28th
- Category: International Series Gold
- Draw: 32S / 16D
- Prize money: $765,000
- Surface: Hard / indoor
- Location: Vienna, Austria
- Venue: Wiener Stadthalle

Champions

Singles
- (Switzerland) Roger Federer

Doubles
- (Australia) Joshua Eagle / (Australia) Sandon Stolle
- Vienna Open

The 2002 CA-TennisTrophy was a men's tennis tournament played on indoor hard courts at the Wiener Stadthalle in Vienna, Austria and was part of the International Series Gold of the 2002 ATP Tour. It was the 28th edition of the tournament and was held from 7 October until 13 October 2002. Sixth-seeded Roger Federer won the singles title.

== Finals ==
=== Singles ===
(Switzerland) Roger Federer defeated (Czech Republic) Jiří Novák 6–4, 6–1, 3–6, 6–4

- It was Federer's 3rd singles title of the year and the 4th of his career.

=== Doubles ===
(Australia) Joshua Eagle / (Australia) Sandon Stolle defeated (Czech Republic) Jiří Novák / (Czech Republic) Radek Štěpánek 6–4, 6–3

- It was Eagle's 3rd title of the year and the 5th of his career. It was Stolle's only title of the year and the 22nd of his career.
