= 2000 Stuttgart Masters =

- Date: 30 October – 6 November
- Edition: 12th
- Category: Tennis Masters Series
- Location: Stuttgart, Germany
- Venue: Hanns-Martin-Schleyer-Halle

Champions

Singles
- (South Africa) Wayne Ferreira

Doubles
- (Czech Republic) Jiří Novák / (Czech Republic) David Rikl
← 1999 ·	Stuttgart Masters	· 2001 →

The 2000 Stuttgart Masters was a men's tennis tournament played on indoor hard courts. It was the 12th edition of the event known that year as the Tennis Masters Series–Stuttgart or Stuttgart Masters, and was part of the Tennis Masters Series events of the 2000 ATP Tour. It took place at the Hanns-Martin-Schleyer-Halle in Stuttgart, Germany, from 30 October to 6 November 2000. Wayne Ferreira won the singles title.

== Finals ==
=== Singles ===
(South Africa) Wayne Ferreira defeated (Australia) Lleyton Hewitt, 7–6^{(8–6)}, 3–6, 6–7^{(5–7)}, 7–6^{(7–2)}, 6–2

- It was Ferreira's first singles title of the year, and the 14th of his career.

=== Doubles ===
(Czech Republic) Jiří Novák/ (Czech Republic) David Rikl defeated (United States) Donald Johnson / (South Africa) Piet Norval, 6–2, 6–2

- It was Novák's fourth doubles title of the year, and the 13th of his career.
- It was Rikl's fourth doubles title of the year, and the 19th of his career.
