= 1999 Eurocard Open =

- Date: 25–31 October
- Edition: 4th
- Category: ATP Super 9
- Draw: 48S / 24D
- Prize money: $2,200,000
- Surface: Hard / indoor
- Location: Stuttgart, Germany
- Venue: Schleyerhalle

Champions

Singles
- (Sweden) Thomas Enqvist

Doubles
- (Sweden) Jonas Björkman / (Zimbabwe) Byron Black
← 1998 ·	Eurocard Open	· 2000 →

The 1999 Stuttgart Masters (known as the Eurocard Open for sponsorship reasons) was a men's tennis tournament played on indoor hard courts. It was the 4th edition of the Stuttgart Masters, and was part of the ATP Super 9 of the 1999 ATP Tour. It took place at the Schleyerhalle in Stuttgart, Germany, from 25 October through 31 October 1999. Thomas Enqvist, seeded 13th, won the singles title.

== Finals ==
=== Singles ===
(Sweden) Thomas Enqvist defeated (Netherlands) Richard Krajicek 6–1, 6–4, 5–7, 7–5

- It was Enqvist's 2nd title of the year and his 15th overall. It was his 1st Super 9 title of the year, and his 2nd overall.

=== Doubles ===
(Sweden) Jonas Björkman / (Zimbabwe) Byron Black defeated (South Africa) David Adams / (South Africa) John-Laffnie de Jager 6–7^{(6–8)}, 7–6^{(7–2)}, 6–0
