= 2000 Stuttgart Masters – Doubles =

Doubles
- 2000 Stuttgart Masters

Final
- Champions: (Czech Republic) Jiří Novák (Czech Republic) David Rikl
- Runners-up: (United States) Donald Johnson (South Africa) Piet Norval
- Score: 3–6, 6–3, 6–4

Details
- Draw: 24 (5WC/1Q)
- Seeds: 8

Events
Singles	Doubles
← 1999 ·	Eurocard Open	· 2001 →

Jonas Björkman and Byron Black were the defending champions, but Black did not compete this year. Björkman teamed up with David Prinosil and lost in semifinals to tournament winners Jiří Novák and David Rikl.

Jiří Novák and David Rikl won the title by defeating Donald Johnson and Piet Norval 3–6, 6–3, 6–4 in the final.

== Seeds ==
All seeds receive a bye into the second round.

1. (Netherlands) Paul Haarhuis / (Australia) Sandon Stolle (second round)
2. (South Africa) Ellis Ferreira / (United States) Rick Leach (quarterfinals)
3. (United States) Alex O'Brien / (United States) Jared Palmer (second round)
4. (South Africa) Wayne Ferreira / (Russia) Yevgeny Kafelnikov (quarterfinals)
5. (Czech Republic) Jiří Novák / (Czech Republic) David Rikl (champions)
6. (Australia) Lleyton Hewitt / (Belarus) Max Mirnyi (second round)
7. (South Africa) David Adams / (South Africa) John-Laffnie de Jager (second round)
8. (Canada) Sébastien Lareau / (Canada) Daniel Nestor (second round)

== Draw ==
=== Key ===
- Q = Qualifier
- WC = Wild card
- LL = Lucky loser
- Alt = Alternate
- ITF = ITF entry
- PR = Protected ranking
- SR = Special ranking
- SE = Special exempt
- JE = Junior exempt
- JR = Junior Accelerator Programme entrant
- CO = College Accelerator Programme entrant
- NG = Next Gen Accelerator Program entrant
- w/o = Walkover
- r = Retired
- d = Defaulted

=== Finals ===
Semifinals
(Australia) Wayne Arthurs (Federal Republic of Yugoslavia) Nenad Zimonjić	4	6	3
(United States) Donald Johnson (South Africa) Piet Norval	6	3	6
5	(Czech Republic) Jiří Novák (Czech Republic) David Rikl	6	6
(Sweden) Jonas Björkman (Germany) David Prinosil	2	4

Final
(United States) Donald Johnson (South Africa) Piet Norval	6	3	4
5	(Czech Republic) Jiří Novák (Czech Republic) David Rikl	3	6	6

=== Top half ===
First round
(Australia) W Arthurs (Federal Republic of Yugoslavia) N Zimonjić	7^{7}	6
WC	(Australia) P Rafter (Australia) M Woodforde	6^{3}	3
WC	(Croatia) G Ivanišević (Russia) M Safin	7^{9}	6
(Sweden) N Kulti (Sweden) M Tillström	6^{7}	4
(United States) D Johnson (South Africa) P Norval	6	7^{7}
(United States) J-M Gambill (United States) S Humphries	3	6^{2}
(Argentina) P Albano (Brazil) J Oncins	6	7^{7}
WC	(Romania) I Moldovan (Romania) A Pavel	2	6^{3}

Second round
1	(Netherlands) P Haarhuis (Australia) S Stolle	3	6^{4}
(Australia) W Arthurs (Federal Republic of Yugoslavia) N Zimonjić	6	7^{7}
WC	(Croatia) G Ivanišević (Russia) M Safin	7^{7}	4	6
8	(Canada) S Lareau (Canada) D Nestor	6^{4}	6	3
3	(United States) A O'Brien (United States) J Palmer	4	4
(United States) D Johnson (South Africa) P Norval	6	6
(Argentina) P Albano (Brazil) J Oncins	6^{5}	6	6
6	(Australia) L Hewitt (Belarus) M Mirnyi	7^{7}	2	3

Quarterfinals
(Australia) W Arthurs (Federal Republic of Yugoslavia) N Zimonjić	6	6
WC	(Croatia) G Ivanišević (Russia) M Safin	3	4
(United States) D Johnson (South Africa) P Norval	6	6
(Argentina) P Albano (Brazil) J Oncins	3	4

Semifinals
(Australia) W Arthurs (Federal Republic of Yugoslavia) N Zimonjić	4	6	3
(United States) D Johnson (South Africa) P Norval	6	3	6

=== Bottom half ===
First round
WC	(Germany) J Knippschild (Germany) R Schüttler	4	6^{3}
(India) M Bhupathi (Zimbabwe) K Ullyett	6	7^{7}
(Australia) J Eagle (Australia) A Florent	6^{6}	5
(Switzerland) R Federer (Slovakia) D Hrbatý	7^{8}	7
Q	(Australia) M Hill (Australia) D Macpherson	5	4
(Sweden) J Björkman (Germany) D Prinosil	7	6
WC	(United States) A Agassi (Armenia) S Sargsian	6^{2}	6	7^{7}
(Spain) T Carbonell (Argentina) M García	7^{7}	3	6^{4}

Second round
5	(Czech Republic) J Novák (Czech Republic) D Rikl	6	6
(India) M Bhupathi (Zimbabwe) K Ullyett	4	3
(Switzerland) R Federer (Slovakia) D Hrbatý	4	2
4	(South Africa) W Ferreira (Russia) Y Kafelnikov	6	6
7	(South Africa) D Adams (South Africa) J-L de Jager	2	2
(Sweden) J Björkman (Germany) D Prinosil	6	6
WC	(United States) A Agassi (Armenia) S Sargsian	3	5
2	(South Africa) E Ferreira (United States) R Leach	6	7

Quarterfinals
5	(Czech Republic) J Novák (Czech Republic) D Rikl	6	6^{7}	6
4	(South Africa) W Ferreira (Russia) Y Kafelnikov	1	7^{9}	2
(Sweden) J Björkman (Germany) D Prinosil	6	6
2	(South Africa) E Ferreira (United States) R Leach	3	2

Semifinals
5	(Czech Republic) J Novák (Czech Republic) D Rikl	6	6
(Sweden) J Björkman (Germany) D Prinosil	2	4

== Qualifying ==
=== Qualifying seeds ===
1. (Argentina) Lucas Arnold Ker / (Argentina) Daniel Orsanic (qualifying competition)
2. (Australia) Michael Hill / (Australia) David Macpherson (qualified)

=== Qualifiers ===
1. (Australia) Michael Hill / (Australia) David Macpherson

=== Qualifying draw ===
First round
1	(Argentina) Lucas Arnold Ker (Argentina) Daniel Orsanic	6	6
WC	(Morocco) Karim Alami (Brazil) Gustavo Kuerten	1	1
(South Africa) Marius Barnard (South Africa) Robbie Koenig	4	4
2	(Australia) Michael Hill (Australia) David Macpherson	6	6

Qualifying competition
1	(Argentina) Lucas Arnold Ker (Argentina) Daniel Orsanic	6^{4}	2
2	(Australia) Michael Hill (Australia) David Macpherson	7^{7}	6
