= 2002 CA-TennisTrophy – Doubles =

Doubles
- 2002 CA-TennisTrophy

Final
- Champions: (Australia) Joshua Eagle (Australia) Sandon Stolle
- Runners-up: (Czech Republic) Jiří Novák (Czech Republic) Radek Štěpánek
- Score: 6–4, 6–3

Details
- Draw: 16
- Seeds: 4

Events
Singles	Doubles
← 2001 ·	Vienna Open	· 2003 →

Martin Damm and Radek Štěpánek were the defending champions but they competed with different partners that year, Damm with Cyril Suk and Štěpánek with Jiří Novák.

Damm and Suk lost in the first round to Simon Aspelin and Andrei Olhovskiy.

Novák and Štěpánek lost in the final 6–4, 6–3 against Joshua Eagle and Sandon Stolle.

== Seeds ==
1. (United States) Bob Bryan / (United States) Mike Bryan (first round)
2. (Czech Republic) Martin Damm / (Czech Republic) Cyril Suk (first round)
3. (Australia) Joshua Eagle / (Australia) Sandon Stolle (champions)
4. (Czech Republic) Jiří Novák / (Czech Republic) Radek Štěpánek (final)

== Draw ==
=== Key ===
- Q = Qualifier
- WC = Wild card
- LL = Lucky loser
- Alt = Alternate
- SE = Special exempt
- PR = Protected ranking
- ITF = ITF entry
- JE = Junior exempt
- w/o = Walkover
- r = Retired
- d = Defaulted
- SR = Special ranking

First round
1	(United States) B Bryan (United States) M Bryan	3	5
(South Africa) J Coetzee (South Africa) C Haggard	6	7
(Ecuador) N Lapentti (Romania) A Pavel	6	6
WC	(Austria) O Marach (Austria) A Peya	1	2
4	(Czech Republic) J Novák (Czech Republic) R Štěpánek	6	7
(Czech Republic) P Pála (Czech Republic) P Vízner	3	5
(Czech Republic) F Čermák (Czech Republic) L Friedl	6	6
WC	(Austria) S Koubek (Austria) J Melzer	4	4
(South Africa) D Adams (United States) J Palmer	4	7^{7}	6
(United States) J Blake (United States) D Bowen	6	6^{4}	4
(Argentina) D Nalbandian (Spain) T Robredo	3	4
3	(Australia) J Eagle (Australia) S Stolle	6	6
(Switzerland) G Bastl (Switzerland) R Federer	6	6^{5}	6
WC	(Germany) T Haas (United States) G Weiner	4	7^{7}	0
(Sweden) S Aspelin (Russia) A Olhovskiy	6	4	6
2	(Czech Republic) M Damm (Czech Republic) C Suk	4	6	2

Quarterfinals
(South Africa) J Coetzee (South Africa) C Haggard	2	7^{7}	4
(Ecuador) N Lapentti (Romania) A Pavel	6	6^{3}	6
4	(Czech Republic) J Novák (Czech Republic) R Štěpánek	6	6^{5}	6
(Czech Republic) F Čermák (Czech Republic) L Friedl	2	7^{7}	4
(South Africa) D Adams (United States) J Palmer	6^{3}	4
3	(Australia) J Eagle (Australia) S Stolle	7^{7}	6
(Switzerland) G Bastl (Switzerland) R Federer	4	6^{3}
(Sweden) S Aspelin (Russia) A Olhovskiy	6	7^{7}

Semifinals
(Ecuador) N Lapentti (Romania) A Pavel	6^{6}	5
4	(Czech Republic) J Novák (Czech Republic) R Štěpánek	7^{8}	7
3	(Australia) J Eagle (Australia) S Stolle	6	7^{7}
(Sweden) S Aspelin (Russia) A Olhovskiy	4	6^{3}

Final
4	(Czech Republic) J Novák (Czech Republic) R Štěpánek	4	3
3	(Australia) J Eagle (Australia) S Stolle	6	6
