= 2000 CA-TennisTrophy =

- Date: 9–15 October
- Edition: 26th
- Category: International Series Gold
- Draw: 32S / 16D
- Prize money: $700,000
- Surface: Hard / indoor
- Location: Vienna, Austria
- Venue: Wiener Stadthalle

Champions

Singles
- (United Kingdom) Tim Henman

Doubles
- (Russia) Yevgeny Kafelnikov / (Serbia and Montenegro) Nenad Zimonjić
- Vienna Open

The 2000 CA-TennisTrophy was a men's tennis tournament played on indoor hard courts at the Wiener Stadthalle in Vienna, Austria and was part of the International Series Gold of the 2000 ATP Tour. It was the 26th edition of the tournament and was held from 9 October through 15 October 2000. Sixth-seeded Tim Henman won the singles title.

== Finals ==
=== Singles ===
(United Kingdom) Tim Henman defeated (Germany) Tommy Haas 6–4, 6–4, 6–4

- It was Henman's 1st title of the year and the 5th of his career.

=== Doubles ===
(Russia) Yevgeny Kafelnikov / (Serbia and Montenegro) Nenad Zimonjić defeated (Czech Republic) Jiří Novák / (Czech Republic) David Rikl 6–4, 6–4

- It was Kafelnikov's 2nd title of the year and the 21st of his career. It was Zimonjić's 2nd title of the year and the 3rd of his career.
