= 1999 Eurocard Open – Doubles =

Doubles
- 1999 Eurocard Open

Final
- Champions: (Sweden) Jonas Björkman (Zimbabwe) Byron Black
- Runners-up: (South Africa) David Adams (South Africa) John-Laffnie de Jager
- Score: 6–7^{(6–8)}, 7–6^{(7–2)}, 6–0

Details
- Draw: 28 (3WC/1Q/1LL)
- Seeds: 8

Events
Singles	Doubles
← 1998 ·	Eurocard Open	· 2000 →

Sébastien Lareau and Alex O'Brien were the defending champions, but lost in quarterfinals to Andrei Olhovskiy and David Prinosil.

Jonas Björkman and Byron Black won the title by defeating David Adams and John-Laffnie de Jager 6–7^{(6–8)}, 7–6^{(7–2)}, 6–0 in the final.

== Seeds ==
All eight seeds received a bye into the second round.

1. (Canada) Sébastien Lareau / (United States) Alex O'Brien (quarterfinals)
2. (Netherlands) Paul Haarhuis / (United States) Jared Palmer (second round)
3. (Sweden) Jonas Björkman / (Zimbabwe) Byron Black (champions)
4. (Australia) Todd Woodbridge / (Australia) Mark Woodforde (semifinals)
5. (France) Olivier Delaître / (France) Fabrice Santoro (second round)
6. (South Africa) Ellis Ferreira / (United States) Rick Leach (second round)
7. (South Africa) David Adams / (South Africa) John-Laffnie de Jager (final)
8. (Russia) Andrei Olhovskiy / (Germany) David Prinosil (semifinals)

== Draw ==
=== Key ===
- Q = Qualifier
- WC = Wild card
- LL = Lucky loser
- Alt = Alternate
- SE = Special exempt
- PR = Protected ranking
- ITF = ITF entry
- JE = Junior exempt
- w/o = Walkover
- r = Retired
- d = Defaulted
- SR = Special ranking

=== Finals ===
Semifinals
8	(Russia) Andrei Olhovskiy (Germany) David Prinosil	6	4	6^{5}
3	(Sweden) Jonas Björkman (Zimbabwe) Byron Black	2	6	7^{7}
4	(Australia) Todd Woodbridge (Australia) Mark Woodforde	4	6	2
7	(South Africa) David Adams (South Africa) John-Laffnie de Jager	6	3	6

Final
3	(Sweden) Jonas Björkman (Zimbabwe) Byron Black	6^{6}	7^{7}	6
7	(South Africa) David Adams (South Africa) John-Laffnie de Jager	7^{8}	6^{2}	0

=== Top half ===
First round
(United States) J Gimelstob (Czech Republic) D Vacek	7^{7}	6
(United States) R Reneberg (United States) J Stark	6^{5}	3
(Czech Republic) J Novák (Czech Republic) D Rikl	7^{7}	3	6
(Croatia) G Ivanišević (United States) J Tarango	6^{5}	6	4
WC	(Germany) M Kohlmann (Germany) R Schüttler	6	6
(The Bahamas) M Knowles (Russia) Y Kafelnikov	4	3
Q	(United States) JM Gambill (Netherlands) S Schalken	w/o
WC	(United States) A Agassi (Germany) N Kiefer

Second round
1	(Canada) S Lareau (United States) A O'Brien	7^{7}	6
(United States) J Gimelstob (Czech Republic) D Vacek	6^{2}	4
(Czech Republic) J Novák (Czech Republic) D Rikl	6	2	4
8	(Russia) A Olhovskiy (Germany) D Prinosil	1	6	6
3	(Sweden) J Björkman (Zimbabwe) B Black	6	6
WC	(Germany) M Kohlmann (Germany) R Schüttler	2	2
Q	(United States) JM Gambill (Netherlands) S Schalken	6	7^{8}
5	(France) O Delaître (France) F Santoro	4	6^{6}

Quarterfinals
1	(Canada) S Lareau (United States) A O'Brien	3	6	3
8	(Russia) A Olhovskiy (Germany) D Prinosil	6	4	6
3	(Sweden) J Björkman (Zimbabwe) B Black	6	3	6
Q	(United States) JM Gambill (Netherlands) S Schalken	3	6	1

Semifinals
8	(Russia) A Olhovskiy (Germany) D Prinosil	6	4	6^{5}
3	(Sweden) J Björkman (Zimbabwe) B Black	2	6	7^{7}

=== Bottom half ===
First round
WC	(Switzerland) I Heuberger (Switzerland) M Rosset	3	4
(Australia) W Arthurs (Australia) A Kratzmann	6	6
(Sweden) N Kulti (Sweden) M Tillström	6^{3}	6	1
(South Africa) W Ferreira (Australia) S Stolle	7^{7}	3	6
(Australia) A Florent (Australia) D Macpherson	7	7^{8}
(South Africa) P Norval (Zimbabwe) K Ullyett	5	6^{6}
(United States) D Johnson (Czech Republic) C Suk	4	7^{7}	4
LL	(Slovakia) D Hrbatý (Romania) A Pavel	6	6^{5}	6

Second round
6	(South Africa) E Ferreira (United States) R Leach	6	6^{2}	3
(Australia) W Arthurs (Australia) A Kratzmann	4	7^{7}	6
(South Africa) W Ferreira (Australia) S Stolle	6	6^{3}	4
4	(Australia) M Woodforde (Australia) T Woodbridge	4	7^{7}	6
7	(South Africa) D Adams (South Africa) JL de Jager	6	6
(Australia) A Florent (Australia) D Macpherson	3	4
LL	(Slovakia) D Hrbatý (Romania) A Pavel	6	6
2	(Netherlands) P Haarhuis (United States) J Palmer	4	4

Quarterfinals
(Australia) W Arthurs (Australia) A Kratzmann	4	4
4	(Australia) M Woodforde (Australia) T Woodbridge	6	6
7	(South Africa) D Adams (South Africa) JL de Jager	6	6
LL	(Slovakia) D Hrbatý (Romania) A Pavel	3	4

Semifinals
4	(Australia) M Woodforde (Australia) T Woodbridge	4	6	2
7	(South Africa) D Adams (South Africa) JL de Jager	6	3	6

== Qualifying ==
=== Qualifying seeds ===
1. (South Africa) Chris Haggard / (Australia) Peter Tramacchi (first round)
2. (United States) Jan-Michael Gambill / (Netherlands) Sjeng Schalken (qualified)

=== Qualifiers ===
1. (United States) Jan-Michael Gambill / (Netherlands) Sjeng Schalken

=== Lucky losers ===
1. (Slovakia) Dominik Hrbatý / (Romania) Andrei Pavel

=== Qualifying draw ===
First round
1	(South Africa) Chris Haggard (Australia) Peter Tramacchi	2	6
(Slovakia) Dominik Hrbatý (Romania) Andrei Pavel	6	7
WC	(Sweden) Thomas Enqvist (Sweden) Magnus Norman	3	3
2	(United States) Jan-Michael Gambill (Netherlands) Sjeng Schalken	6	6

Qualifying competition
(Slovakia) Dominik Hrbatý (Romania) Andrei Pavel	6	4
2	(United States) Jan-Michael Gambill (Netherlands) Sjeng Schalken	7	6
