= 2001 CA-TennisTrophy – Doubles =

Doubles
- 2001 CA-TennisTrophy

Final
- Champions: (Czech Republic) Martin Damm (Czech Republic) Radek Štěpánek
- Runners-up: (Czech Republic) Jiří Novák (Czech Republic) David Rikl
- Score: 6–3, 6–2

Details
- Draw: 16
- Seeds: 4

Events
Singles	Doubles
← 2000 ·	Vienna Open	· 2002 →

Yevgeny Kafelnikov and Nenad Zimonjić were the defending champions but only Kafelnikov competed that year with Wayne Ferreira.

Ferreira and Kafelnikov lost in the first round to Jiří Novák and David Rikl.

Martin Damm and Radek Štěpánek won in the final 6–3, 6–2 against Novák and Rikl.

== Seeds ==
1. (Czech Republic) Jiří Novák / (Czech Republic) David Rikl (final)
2. (Zimbabwe) Wayne Black / (Zimbabwe) Kevin Ullyett (first round)
3. (Czech Republic) Petr Pála / (Czech Republic) Pavel Vízner (semifinals)
4. (Australia) Joshua Eagle / (Australia) Andrew Florent (first round)

== Draw ==
=== Key ===
- Q = Qualifier
- WC = Wild card
- LL = Lucky loser
- Alt = Alternate
- SE = Special exempt
- PR = Protected ranking
- ITF = ITF entry
- JE = Junior exempt
- w/o = Walkover
- r = Retired
- d = Defaulted
- SR = Special ranking

First round
1	(Czech Republic) J Novák (Czech Republic) D Rikl	7^{8}	7^{7}
(South Africa) W Ferreira (Russia) Y Kafelnikov	6^{6}	6^{2}
WC	(Spain) A Costa (Spain) T Robredo	6	6
(Czech Republic) T Cibulec (Czech Republic) L Friedl	1	4
4	(Australia) J Eagle (Australia) A Florent	2	6	3
(Argentina) M García (Czech Republic) C Suk	6	4	6
(Sweden) P Nyborg (Czech Republic) D Vacek	7^{7}	7^{7}
(Japan) T Shimada (South Africa) M Wakefield	6^{5}	6^{3}
(South Africa) D Adams (Slovakia) D Hrbatý	2	6^{3}
WC	(Germany) T Haas (United States) G Weiner	6	7^{7}
WC	(Austria) M Hipfl (Austria) S Koubek	3	6	1
3	(Czech Republic) P Pála (Czech Republic) P Vízner	6	4	6
WC	(Austria) J Knowle (Austria) A Peya	6	4	3
(South Africa) C Haggard (Belgium) T Vanhoudt	3	6	6
(Czech Republic) M Damm (Czech Republic) R Štěpánek	6	6
2	(Zimbabwe) W Black (Zimbabwe) K Ullyett	4	3

Quarterfinals
1	(Czech Republic) J Novák (Czech Republic) D Rikl	6	6
WC	(Spain) A Costa (Spain) T Robredo	2	4
(Argentina) M García (Czech Republic) C Suk	3	4
(Sweden) P Nyborg (Czech Republic) D Vacek	6	6
WC	(Germany) T Haas (United States) G Weiner	2	6	3
3	(Czech Republic) P Pála (Czech Republic) P Vízner	6	1	6
(South Africa) C Haggard (Belgium) T Vanhoudt	3	5
(Czech Republic) M Damm (Czech Republic) R Štěpánek	6	7

Semifinals
1	(Czech Republic) J Novák (Czech Republic) D Rikl	7^{7}	6
(Sweden) P Nyborg (Czech Republic) D Vacek	6^{3}	3
3	(Czech Republic) P Pála (Czech Republic) P Vízner	4	4
(Czech Republic) M Damm (Czech Republic) R Štěpánek	6	6

Final
1	(Czech Republic) J Novák (Czech Republic) D Rikl	3	2
(Czech Republic) M Damm (Czech Republic) R Štěpánek	6	6
