= 2000 Stuttgart Masters – Singles =

Singles
- 2000 Stuttgart Masters

Final
- Champion: (South Africa) Wayne Ferreira
- Runner-up: (Australia) Lleyton Hewitt
- Score: 7–6^{(8–6)}, 3–6, 6–7^{(5–7)}, 7–6 ^{(7–2)}, 6–2

Details
- Draw: 48 (4WC/6Q/1LL)
- Seeds: 16

Events
Singles	Doubles
← 1999 ·	Eurocard Open	· 2001 →

Wayne Ferreira defeated Lleyton Hewitt in the final, 7–6^{(8–6)}, 3–6, 6–7^{(5–7)}, 7–6 ^{(7–2)}, 6–2 to win the singles tennis title at the 2000 Eurocard Open. With the win, Ferreira ended a 4-year drought in his professional career, after winning his last tournament at Toronto in 1996.

Thomas Enqvist was the defending champion, but lost to Ferreira in the second round.

== Seeds ==
A champion seed is indicated in bold text while text in italics indicates the round in which that seed was eliminated. All sixteen seeds received a bye into the second round.

1. (Russia) Marat Safin (third round)
2. (Brazil) Gustavo Kuerten (third round)
3. (Sweden) Magnus Norman (third round)
4. (United States) Andre Agassi (third round)
5. (Sweden) Thomas Enqvist (second round)
6. (Russia) Yevgeny Kafelnikov (semifinals)
7. (Spain) Álex Corretja (second round)
8. (Australia) Lleyton Hewitt (final)
9. (United Kingdom) Tim Henman (third round)
10. (Spain) Juan Carlos Ferrero (second round)
11. (Argentina) Franco Squillari (third round)
12. (Australia) Mark Philippoussis (third round)
13. (Germany) ~~Nicolas Kiefer~~ (withdrew)
14. (Australia) Patrick Rafter (second round)
15. (Ecuador) Nicolás Lapentti (second round)
16. (Argentina) Mariano Puerta (second round)

== Draw ==
=== Key ===
- Q = Qualifier
- WC = Wild card
- LL = Lucky loser
- Alt = Alternate
- ITF = ITF entry
- PR = Protected ranking
- SR = Special ranking
- SE = Special exempt
- JE = Junior exempt
- JR = Junior Accelerator Programme entrant
- CO = College Accelerator Programme entrant
- NG = Next Gen Accelerator Program entrant
- w/o = Walkover
- r = Retired
- d = Defaulted

=== Finals ===
Quarterfinals
(United Kingdom) Greg Rusedski	4	4
8	**(Australia) Lleyton Hewitt**	**6**	**6**
LL	(Netherlands) Sjeng Schalken	**6**	1	4
6	**(Russia) Yevgeny Kafelnikov**	4	**6**	**6**
**(South Africa) Wayne Ferreira**	**6**	**7**
(Romania) Andrei Pavel	0	5
(United States) Michael Chang	5	**6**	2
**(France) Sébastien Grosjean**	**7**	1	**6**

Semifinals
8	(Australia) **Lleyton Hewitt**	**6**	6^{5}	**6**
6	(Russia) Yevgeny Kafelnikov	4	**7^{7}**	3
(South Africa) **Wayne Ferreira**	**6**	**6**
(France) Sébastien Grosjean	4	2

Final
8	(Australia) Lleyton Hewitt	6^{6}	**6**	**7^{7}**	6^{2}	2
(South Africa) **Wayne Ferreira**	**7^{8}**	3	6^{5}	**7^{7}**	**6**

=== Top half ===
==== Section 1 ====
First round
WC	(Croatia) G Ivanišević	3	6^{4}
(France) **F Santoro**	**6**	**7^{7}**
(United Kingdom) **G Rusedski**	**6**	**6**
(France) J Golmard	1	2
(Czech Republic) J Novák	5	**7^{7}**	6^{3}
(Spain) **Á Costa**	**7**	6^{4}	**7^{7}**
Q	(Spain) A Martín	2	4
(Netherlands) **R Krajicek**	**6**	**6**

Second round
1	(Russia) **M Safin**	**6**	**6**
(France) F Santoro	2	4
(United Kingdom) **G Rusedski**	**6**	**6**
16	(Argentina) M Puerta	2	3
9	(United Kingdom) **T Henman**	**6**	**6**
(Spain) Á Costa	2	3
(Netherlands) R Krajicek	4	5
8	(Australia) **L Hewitt**	**6**	**7**

Third round
1	(Russia) M Safin	6^{2}	4
(United Kingdom) **G Rusedski**	**7^{7}**	**6**
9	(United Kingdom) T Henman	**6**	3	4
8	(Australia) **L Hewitt**	3	**6**	**6**

Quarterfinals
(United Kingdom) G Rusedski	4	4
8	(Australia) **L Hewitt**	**6**	**6**

==== Section 2 ====
First round
WC	(Germany) R Schüttler	**6**	4	3
(Switzerland) **M Rosset**	3	**6**	**6**
Q	(France) **J Boutter**	**6**	3	**6**
(Morocco) H Arazi	4	**6**	1
(Slovakia) **D Hrbatý**	**6**	3	**6**
WC	(Spain) C Moyà	3	**6**	2
(Switzerland) **R Federer**	**7^{7}**	**1**
(United States) J-M Gambill	6^{3}	0	r

Second round
3	(Sweden) **M Norman**	**w/o**
(Switzerland) M Rosset
Q	(France) J Boutter	1	3
LL	(Netherlands) **S Schalken**	**6**	**6**
11	(Argentina) **F Squillari**	6^{4}	**6**	**6**
(Slovakia) D Hrbatý	**7^{7}**	3	3
(Switzerland) R Federer	5	3
6	(Russia) **Y Kafelnikov**	**7**	**6**

Third round
3	(Sweden) M Norman	**6**	3	3
LL	(Netherlands) **S Schalken**	4	**6**	**6**
11	(Argentina) F Squillari	3	5
6	(Russia) **Y Kafelnikov**	**6**	**7**

Quarterfinals
LL	(Netherlands) S Schalken	**6**	1	4
6	(Russia) **Y Kafelnikov**	4	**6**	**6**

=== Bottom half ===
==== Section 3 ====
First round
(South Africa) **W Ferreira**	**6**	6^{6}	**6**
Q	(Germany) C Vinck	3	**7^{8}**	4
(France) **A Clément**	**6**	1	**6**
(Sweden) A Vinciguerra	2	**6**	4
(Argentina) G Gaudio	4	**6**	0
(Romania) **A Pavel**	**6**	4	**6**
(Spain) F Clavet	6^{3}	**7^{7}**	4
Q	(Sweden) **T Johansson**	**7^{7}**	6^{2}	**6**

Second round
5	(Sweden) T Enqvist	2	5
(South Africa) **W Ferreira**	**6**	**7**
(France) A Clément	3	3
12	(Australia) **M Philippoussis**	**6**	**6**
14	(Australia) P Rafter	6^{2}	1
(Romania) **A Pavel**	**7^{7}**	**6**
Q	(Sweden) T Johansson	4	2
4	(United States) **A Agassi**	**6**	**6**

Third round
(South Africa) **W Ferreira**	**1**
12	(Australia) M Philippoussis	0	r
(Romania) **A Pavel**	**6**	**6**
4	(United States) A Agassi	3	4

Quarterfinals
(South Africa) **W Ferreira**	**6**	**7**
(Romania) A Pavel	0	5

==== Section 4 ====
First round
(United States) **M Chang**	**6**	6^{3}	**7^{7}**
Q	(Germany) J Knippschild	3	**7^{7}**	6^{1}
(Morocco) **Y El Aynaoui**	**7^{9}**	3	**6**
(Morocco) K Alami	6^{7}	**6**	3
(France) **S Grosjean**	**6**	**6**
WC	(Germany) T Haas	4	2
Q	(Germany) B Phau	3	4
(France) **N Escudé**	**6**	**6**

Second round
7	(Spain) Á Corretja	**6**	5	0
(United States) **M Chang**	1	**7**	**6**
(Morocco) **Y El Aynaoui**	**7^{7}**	**6**
10	(Spain) J C Ferrero	6^{4}	4
15	(Ecuador) N Lapentti	1	0
(France) **S Grosjean**	**6**	**6**
(France) N Escudé	6^{8}	6^{1}
2	(Brazil) **G Kuerten**	**7^{10}**	**7^{7}**

Third round
(United States) **M Chang**	**7**	**6**
(Morocco) Y El Aynaoui	5	2
(France) **S Grosjean**	**7^{11}**	**6**
2	(Brazil) G Kuerten	6^{9}	3

Quarterfinals
(United States) M Chang	5	**6**	2
(France) **S Grosjean**	**7**	1	**6**

== Qualifying ==
=== Qualifying seeds ===
1. (Netherlands) Sjeng Schalken (qualifying competition, **lucky loser**)
2. (Belarus) Max Mirnyi (first round)
3. (Spain) Álex Calatrava (qualifying competition)
4. (France) Arnaud Di Pasquale (qualifying competition)
5. (Sweden) **Thomas Johansson (qualified)**
6. (Czech Republic) Jiří Vaněk (qualifying competition)
7. (Australia) Wayne Arthurs (first round)
8. (Czech Republic) Bohdan Ulihrach (first round)
9. (France) **Julien Boutter (qualified)**
10. (Spain) **Alberto Martín (qualified)**
11. (Croatia) Ivan Ljubičić (qualifying competition)
12. (Germany) Daniel Elsner (first round)

=== Qualifiers ===
1. (Germany) **Björn Phau**
2. (Germany) **Jens Knippschild**
3. (Spain) **Alberto Martín**
4. (France) **Julien Boutter**
5. (Sweden) **Thomas Johansson**
6. (Germany) **Christian Vinck**

=== Lucky loser ===
1. (Netherlands) **Sjeng Schalken**

=== Qualifying draw ===
==== First qualifier ====
First round
1	**(Netherlands) Sjeng Schalken**	**7^{7}**	2	**6**
(Italy) Andrea Gaudenzi	6^{5}	**6**	0
WC	**(Germany) Björn Phau**	**6**	**6**
12	(Germany) Daniel Elsner	2	4

Qualifying competition
1	(Netherlands) Sjeng Schalken	3	2
WC	**(Germany) Björn Phau**	**6**	**6**

==== Second qualifier ====
First round
2	(Belarus) Max Mirnyi	**6**	6^{5}	4
**(Germany) Jens Knippschild**	3	**7^{7}**	**6**
(Canada) Sébastien Lareau	3	6^{4}
11	**(Croatia) Ivan Ljubičić**	**6**	**7^{7}**

Qualifying competition
**(Germany) Jens Knippschild**	**7^{13}**	**6**
11	(Croatia) Ivan Ljubičić	6^{11}	1

==== Third qualifier ====
First round
3	**(Spain) Álex Calatrava**	**7^{10}**	3	**6**
WC	(Germany) Jakub Záhlava	6^{8}	**6**	3
(Italy) Diego Nargiso	**7^{7}**	2	1
10	**(Spain) Alberto Martín**	6^{5}	**6**	**6**

Qualifying competition
3	(Spain) Álex Calatrava	4	2
10	**(Spain) Alberto Martín**	**6**	**6**

==== Fourth qualifier ====
First round
4	**(France) Arnaud Di Pasquale**	**7**	1	**6**
(Germany) Andy Fahlke	5	**6**	4
WC	(Romania) Ion Moldovan	1	2
9	**(France) Julien Boutter**	**6**	**6**

Qualifying competition
4	(France) Arnaud Di Pasquale	3	1
9	**(France) Julien Boutter**	**6**	**6**

==== Fifth qualifier ====
First round
5	**(Sweden) Thomas Johansson**	**6**	**6**
(Romania) Adrian Voinea	4	2
**(Armenia) Sargis Sargsian**	**6**	4	**6**
8	(Czech Republic) Bohdan Ulihrach	3	**6**	0

Qualifying competition
5	**(Sweden) Thomas Johansson**	**6**	**6**
(Armenia) Sargis Sargsian	3	4

==== Sixth qualifier ====
First round
6	**(Czech Republic) Jiří Vaněk**	**7^{7}**	**6**
WC	(Switzerland) Ivo Heuberger	6^{5}	2
**(Germany) Christian Vinck**	4	**6**	**6**
7	(Australia) Wayne Arthurs	**6**	3	3

Qualifying competition
6	(Czech Republic) Jiří Vaněk	6^{5}	6^{3}
**(Germany) Christian Vinck**	**7^{7}**	**7^{7}**
