= 2002 Mutua Madrileña Masters Madrid – Singles =

Singles
- 2002 Mutua Madrileña Masters Madrid

Final
- Champion: (United States) Andre Agassi
- Runner-up: (Czech Republic) Jiří Novák
- Score: Walkover

Details
- Draw: 48 (3WC/6Q/1LL)
- Seeds: 16

Events
Singles	Doubles
Madrid Open	· 2003 →

Andre Agassi won the inaugural singles tennis title at the 2002 Madrid Open after Jiří Novák withdrew from the final.

== Seeds ==
A champion seed is indicated in bold text while text in italics indicates the round in which that seed was eliminated. All sixteen seeds received a bye into the second round.

1. (Germany) Tommy Haas (second round, retired due to a blister on his right hand)
2. (United States) **Andre Agassi (champion)**
3. (Russia) Marat Safin (second round)
4. (United Kingdom) Tim Henman (second round)
5. (Spain) Juan Carlos Ferrero (quarterfinals)
6. (Spain) ~~Albert Costa~~ (withdrew)
7. (France) Sébastien Grosjean (semifinals)
8. (Spain) Carlos Moyá (third round)
9. (Russia) Yevgeny Kafelnikov (second round)
10. (United States) Andy Roddick (second round)
11. (Czech Republic) Jiří Novák (final, withdrew due to a right hamstring injury)
12. (Switzerland) Roger Federer (quarterfinals)
13. (Argentina) Guillermo Cañas (second round)
14. (Netherlands) Sjeng Schalken (second round)
15. (Sweden) Thomas Johansson (third round)
16. (Morocco) Younes El Aynaoui (second round)

== Draw ==
=== Key ===
- Q = Qualifier
- WC = Wild card
- LL = Lucky loser
- Alt = Alternate
- SE = Special exempt
- PR = Protected ranking
- ITF = ITF entry
- JE = Junior exempt
- w/o = Walkover
- r = Retired
- d = Defaulted
- SR = Special ranking

=== Finals ===
Quarterfinals
Q	**(France) Fabrice Santoro**	**7**	**6**
12	(Switzerland) Roger Federer	5	3
(Thailand) Paradorn Srichaphan	**6**	3	4
11	**(Czech Republic) Jiří Novák**	4	**6**	**6**
7	**(France) Sébastien Grosjean**	**6**	**7^{7}**
Q	(Argentina) Agustín Calleri	3	6^{4}
5	(Spain) Juan Carlos Ferrero	3	2
2	**(United States) Andre Agassi**	**6**	**6**

Semifinals
Q	(France) Fabrice Santoro	2	4
11	(Czech Republic) **Jiří Novák**	**6**	**6**
7	(France) Sébastien Grosjean	4	**6**	4
2	(United States) **Andre Agassi**	**6**	3	**6**

Final
11	(Czech Republic) Jiří Novák
2	(United States) **Andre Agassi**	**w/o**

=== Top half ===
==== Section 1 ====
First round
Q	(France) **F Santoro**	**6**	**7^{7}**
Q	(France) J Boutter	3	6^{4}
(Argentina) **D Nalbandian**	**6**	**6**
WC	(Spain) F Clavet	1	1
(Chile) **M Ríos**	**6**	**6**
(Argentina) G Gaudio	2	2
(Switzerland) M Kratochvil	6^{5}	1
(Ecuador) **N Lapentti**	**7^{7}**	**6**

Second round
1	(Germany) T Haas	6^{7}	1	r
Q	(France) **F Santoro**	**7^{9}**	**4**
(Argentina) **D Nalbandian**	4	**6**	**6**
13	(Argentina) G Cañas	**6**	3	3
12	(Switzerland) **R Federer**	**6**	**6**
(Chile) M Ríos	4	2
(Ecuador) **N Lapentti**	**6**	**6**
LL	(Argentina) J Acasuso	3	2

Third round
Q	(France) **F Santoro**	**6**	**6**
(Argentina) D Nalbandian	0	2
12	(Switzerland) **R Federer**	**6**	**6**
(Ecuador) N Lapentti	3	4

Quarterfinals
Q	(France) **F Santoro**	**7**	**6**
12	(Switzerland) R Federer	5	3

==== Section 2 ====
First round
(Thailand) **P Srichaphan**	**6**	**6**
WC	(Brazil) G Kuerten	4	4
(Spain) F Mantilla	3	4
(Croatia) **I Ljubičić**	**6**	**6**
(Belarus) M Mirnyi	4	4
(Spain) **T Robredo**	**6**	**6**
(Chile) **F González**	**6**	**6**
Q	(Brazil) A Sá	3	2

Second round
4	(United Kingdom) T Henman	**6**	3	3
(Thailand) **P Srichaphan**	3	**6**	**6**
(Croatia) **I Ljubičić**	**7^{11}**	**6**
14	(Netherlands) S Schalken	6^{9}	4
11	(Czech Republic) **J Novák**	**6**	**6**
(Spain) T Robredo	1	1
(Chile) F González	**6**	6^{4}	6^{4}
8	(Spain) **C Moyá**	2	**7^{7}**	**7^{7}**

Third round
(Thailand) **P Srichaphan**	**6**	**6**
(Croatia) I Ljubičić	4	2
11	(Czech Republic) **J Novák**	6^{2}	**6**	**7**
8	(Spain) C Moyá	**7^{7}**	4	5

Quarterfinals
(Thailand) P Srichaphan	**6**	3	4
11	(Czech Republic) **J Novák**	4	**6**	**6**

=== Bottom half ===
==== Section 3 ====
First round
(Austria) S Koubek	2	4
(Belgium) **X Malisse**	**6**	**6**
(Russia) **M Youzhny**	**6**	**6**
(Argentina) J I Chela	2	2
(Argentina) M Zabaleta	**7^{7}**	6^{4}	2
(Sweden) **M Norman**	6^{2}	**7^{7}**	**6**
(United States) J Blake	4	2
Q	(Argentina) **A Calleri**	**6**	**6**

Second round
7	(France) **S Grosjean**	**5**
(Belgium) X Malisse	1	r
(Russia) **M Youzhny**	**6**	**6**
10	(United States) A Roddick	3	4
15	(Sweden) **T Johansson**	2	**6**	**6**
(Sweden) M Norman	**6**	3	4
Q	(Argentina) **A Calleri**	**7^{8}**	**7^{7}**
3	(Russia) M Safin	6^{6}	6^{5}

Third round
7	(France) **S Grosjean**	**7^{7}**	**6**
(Russia) M Youzhny	6^{2}	1
15	(Sweden) T Johansson	4	4
Q	(Argentina) **A Calleri**	**6**	**6**

Quarterfinals
7	(France) **S Grosjean**	**6**	**7^{7}**
Q	(Argentina) A Calleri	3	6^{4}

==== Section 4 ====
First round
(Finland) **J Nieminen**	1	**6**	**7^{7}**
(Germany) R Schüttler	**6**	4	6^{5}
(Spain) **À Corretja**	**6**	**7**
Q	(Spain) F Vicente	4	5
WC	(Spain) **F López**	**7^{7}**	3	**6**
(France) A Clément	6^{5}	**6**	4
(Romania) A Pavel	6^{3}	3
Q	(United States) **J-M Gambill**	**7^{7}**	**6**

Second round
5	(Spain) **J C Ferrero**	**6**	6^{6}	**7**
(Finland) J Nieminen	3	**7^{8}**	5
(Spain) **À Corretja**	3	**6**	**6**
9	(Russia) Y Kafelnikov	**6**	3	4
16	(Morocco) Y El Aynaoui	**7^{8}**	4	2
WC	(Spain) **F López**	6^{6}	**6**	**6**
Q	(United States) J-M Gambill	4	4
2	(United States) **A Agassi**	**6**	**6**

Third round
5	(Spain) **J C Ferrero**	3	**6**	**6**
(Spain) À Corretja	**6**	0	1
WC	(Spain) F López	6^{6}	**7^{10}**	5
2	(United States) **A Agassi**	**7^{8}**	6^{8}	**7**

Quarterfinals
5	(Spain) J C Ferrero	3	2
2	(United States) **A Agassi**	**6**	**6**

== Qualifying ==
=== Qualifying seeds ===
1. (Argentina) José Acasuso (qualifying competition, retired. **Lucky loser**)
2. (France) Nicolas Escudé (first round)
3. (United States) **Jan-Michael Gambill (qualified)**
4. (Sweden) Jonas Björkman (first round)
5. (France) **Fabrice Santoro (qualified)**
6. (France) **Julien Boutter (qualified)**
7. (Argentina) Guillermo Coria (first round)
8. (Argentina) **Agustín Calleri (qualified)**
9. (United States) Vince Spadea (qualifying competition)
10. (United States) Taylor Dent (qualifying competition)
11. (Spain) **Fernando Vicente (qualified)**
12. (Spain) David Ferrer (first round)

=== Qualifiers ===
1. (Spain) **Fernando Vicente**
2. (Brazil) **André Sá**
3. (United States) **Jan-Michael Gambill**
4. (Argentina) **Agustín Calleri**
5. (France) **Fabrice Santoro**
6. (France) **Julien Boutter**

=== Lucky loser ===
1. (Argentina) **José Acasuso**

=== Qualifying draw ===
==== First qualifier ====
First round
1	**(Argentina) José Acasuso**	**6**	**6**
Alt	(Brazil) Fernando Meligeni	4	1
(Spain) David Sánchez	1	4
11	**(Spain) Fernando Vicente**	**6**	**6**

Qualifying competition
1	(Argentina) José Acasuso	4	0^{r}
11	**(Spain) Fernando Vicente**	**6**	3

==== Second qualifier ====
First round
2	(France) Nicolas Escudé	4	4
**(Brazil) André Sá**	**6**	**6**
WC	(Italy) Federico Luzzi	4	2
10	**(United States) Taylor Dent**	**6**	**6**

Qualifying competition
**(Brazil) André Sá**	4	**7**	**6**
10	(United States) Taylor Dent	**6**	5	4

==== Third qualifier ====
First round
3	**(United States) Jan-Michael Gambill**	**6**	**6**
(Romania) Adrian Voinea	3	4
**(Germany) Nicolas Kiefer**	**6**	**7^{7}**
7	(Argentina) Guillermo Coria	4	6^{2}

Qualifying competition
3	**(United States) Jan-Michael Gambill**	**6**	**7^{7}**
(Germany) Nicolas Kiefer	2	6^{3}

==== Fourth qualifier ====
First round
4	(Sweden) Jonas Björkman	4	1
**(Chile) Nicolás Massú**	**6**	**6**
(Spain) Alberto Martín	**6**	3	4
8	**(Argentina) Agustín Calleri**	3	**6**	**6**

Qualifying competition
(Chile) Nicolás Massú	2	1
8	**(Argentina) Agustín Calleri**	**6**	**6**

==== Fifth qualifier ====
First round
5	**(France) Fabrice Santoro**	**6**	**6**
WC	(Spain) Jacobo Díaz	3	2
WC	(Spain) Quino Muñoz	6^{3}	**6**	2
9	**(United States) Vince Spadea**	**7^{7}**	3	**6**

Qualifying competition
5	**(France) Fabrice Santoro**	**6**	4	**7^{7}**
9	(United States) Vince Spadea	1	**6**	6^{3}

==== Sixth qualifier ====
First round
6	**(France) Julien Boutter**	**6**	**6**
WC	(Spain) Fernando Verdasco	2	3
**(Morocco) Hicham Arazi**	**6**	2	**6**
12	(Spain) David Ferrer	4	**6**	3

Qualifying competition
6	**(France) Julien Boutter**	4	**6**	**7^{7}**
(Morocco) Hicham Arazi	**6**	4	6^{3}
