= 2002 CA-TennisTrophy – Singles =

Singles
- 2002 CA-TennisTrophy

Final
- Champion: (Switzerland) Roger Federer
- Runner-up: (Czech Republic) Jiří Novák
- Score: 6–4, 6–1, 3–6, 6–4

Details
- Draw: 32 (3WC/4Q/1LL/1SE)
- Seeds: 8

Events
Singles	Doubles
← 2001 ·	Vienna Open	· 2003 →

Tommy Haas was the defending champion but lost in the second round to Jürgen Melzer.

Roger Federer won in the final 6–4, 6–1, 3–6, 6–4 against Jiří Novák.

== Seeds ==
1. (Germany) Tommy Haas (second round)
2. (Spain) Juan Carlos Ferrero (second round)
3. (Spain) Albert Costa (first round)
4. (Spain) Carlos Moyá (semifinals)
5. (Czech Republic) Jiří Novák (final)
6. (Switzerland) Roger Federer (champion)
7. (Netherlands) ~~Sjeng Schalken~~ (withdrew because of fluid on the knee)
8. (Argentina) David Nalbandian (first round)
9. (Belgium) Xavier Malisse (first round)

== Draw ==
=== Key ===
- Q = Qualifier
- WC = Wild card
- LL = Lucky loser
- Alt = Alternate
- SE = Special exempt
- PR = Protected ranking
- ITF = ITF entry
- JE = Junior exempt
- w/o = Walkover
- r = Retired
- d = Defaulted
- SR = Special ranking

=== Final ===
Semifinals
5	(Czech Republic) Jiří Novák	7^{7}	7^{7}
(Romania) Andrei Pavel	6^{2}	6^{2}
4	(Spain) Carlos Moyá	2	3
6	(Switzerland) Roger Federer	6	6

Final
5	(Czech Republic) Jiří Novák	4	1	6	4
6	(Switzerland) Roger Federer	6	6	3	6

=== Section 1 ===
First round
1	(Germany) T Haas	6	2	7
(Russia) M Youzhny	2	6	5
(Argentina) M Zabaleta	3	6	6^{3}
WC	(Austria) J Melzer	6	3	7^{7}
Q	(Argentina) G Coria	5	7	7
(Ecuador) N Lapentti	7	5	5
(Spain) A Martín	2	4
5	(Czech Republic) J Novák	6	6
3	(Spain) A Costa	6^{6}	1
(Romania) A Pavel	7^{8}	6
(Slovakia) D Hrbatý	4	3
(Germany) R Schüttler	6	6
WC	(Austria) S Koubek	3	7^{7}	6^{1}
Q	(Czech Republic) R Štěpánek	6	6^{3}	7^{7}
LL	(Russia) N Davydenko	6	6
8	(Argentina) D Nalbandian	3	2

Second round
1	(Germany) T Haas	4	3
WC	(Austria) J Melzer	6	6
Q	(Argentina) G Coria	5	2
5	(Czech Republic) J Novák	7	6
(Romania) A Pavel	6	6
(Germany) R Schüttler	0	4
Q	(Czech Republic) R Štěpánek	1	7	5
LL	(Russia) N Davydenko	6	5	7

Quarterfinals
WC	(Austria) J Melzer	4	2
5	(Czech Republic) J Novák	6	6
(Romania) A Pavel	6	7^{7}
LL	(Russia) N Davydenko	3	6^{2}

Semifinals
5	(Czech Republic) J Novák	7^{7}	7^{7}
(Romania) A Pavel	6^{2}	6^{2}

=== Section 2 ===
First round
9	(Belgium) X Malisse	6	1	1
(Germany) N Kiefer	4	6	6
(United States) J Blake	3	6	6
SE	(United States) V Spadea	6	2	3
(United States) T Dent	4	7	3
(Argentina) A Calleri	6	5	6
(Czech Republic) J Vacek	4	3
4	(Spain) C Moyá	6	6
6	(Switzerland) R Federer	7	6
Q	(Croatia) Ž Krajan	5	1
(Finland) J Nieminen	3	3
(Spain) T Robredo	6	6
Q	(Czech Republic) B Ulihrach	6	6^{2}	7^{7}
(Switzerland) M Kratochvil	3	7^{7}	6^{2}
(Chile) N Massú	7	4	3
WC/2	(Spain) J C Ferrero	5	6	6

Second round
(Germany) N Kiefer	4	6^{4}
(United States) J Blake	6	7^{7}
(Argentina) A Calleri	3	6	6^{7}
4	(Spain) C Moyá	6	2	7^{9}
6	(Switzerland) R Federer	6	6^{5}	6
(Spain) T Robredo	2	7^{7}	4
Q	(Czech Republic) B Ulihrach	6	6
WC/2	(Spain) J C Ferrero	4	2

Quarterfinals
(United States) J Blake	6^{4}	6	1
4	(Spain) C Moyá	7^{7}	3	6
6	(Switzerland) R Federer	6	6
Q	(Czech Republic) B Ulihrach	3	3

Semifinals
4	(Spain) C Moyá	2	3
6	(Switzerland) R Federer	6	6

== Qualifying ==
=== Qualifying seeds ===
1. (Argentina) Guillermo Coria (qualified)
2. (Czech Republic) Bohdan Ulihrach (qualified)
3. (Czech Republic) Radek Štěpánek (qualified)
4. (Germany) Lars Burgsmüller (first round)
5. (Russia) Nikolay Davydenko (qualifying competition, lucky loser)
6. (Armenia) Sargis Sargsian (first round)
7. (Hungary) Attila Sávolt (qualifying competition)
8. (Sweden) Andreas Vinciguerra (first round)

=== Qualifiers ===
1. (Argentina) Guillermo Coria
2. (Czech Republic) Bohdan Ulihrach
3. (Czech Republic) Radek Štěpánek
4. (Croatia) Željko Krajan

=== Lucky loser ===
1. (Russia) Nikolay Davydenko (replaces Sjeng Schalken)

=== Special exempt ===
1. (United States) Vince Spadea (reached the semifinals at Tokyo)

=== Qualifying draw ===
==== First qualifier ====
First round
1	(Argentina) Guillermo Coria	7	6
(Switzerland) Ivo Heuberger	5	0
WC	(Austria) Werner Eschauer	6	3	4
5	(Russia) Nikolay Davydenko	3	6	6

Qualifying competition
1	(Argentina) Guillermo Coria	6	7
5	(Russia) Nikolay Davydenko	3	5

==== Second qualifier ====
First round
2	(Czech Republic) Bohdan Ulihrach	6	7^{9}
(Austria) Alexander Peya	0	6^{7}
WC	(Austria) Oliver Marach	6	6
8	(Sweden) Andreas Vinciguerra	3	2

Qualifying competition
2	(Czech Republic) Bohdan Ulihrach	6	6
WC	(Austria) Oliver Marach	2	2

==== Third qualifier ====
First round
3	(Czech Republic) Radek Štěpánek	7^{11}	7^{7}
WC	(Austria) Konstantin Gruber	6^{9}	6^{1}
(Russia) Andrei Stoliarov	7	3	4
7	(Hungary) Attila Sávolt	5	6	6

Qualifying competition
3	(Czech Republic) Radek Štěpánek	3	6	6
7	(Hungary) Attila Sávolt	6	3	4

==== Fourth qualifier ====
First round
4	(Germany) Lars Burgsmüller	2	6^{3}
(Germany) Björn Phau	6	7^{7}
(Croatia) Željko Krajan	4	7^{7}	6
6	(Armenia) Sargis Sargsian	6	6^{3}	4

Qualifying competition
(Germany) Björn Phau	2	6^{3}
(Croatia) Željko Krajan	6	7^{7}
