= 2000 CA-TennisTrophy – Doubles =

Doubles
- 2000 CA-TennisTrophy

Final
- Champions: (Russia) Yevgeny Kafelnikov (Serbia and Montenegro) Nenad Zimonjić
- Runners-up: (Czech Republic) Jiří Novák (Czech Republic) David Rikl
- Score: 6–4, 6–4

Details
- Draw: 16 (3WC/1Q/1LL)
- Seeds: 4

Events
Singles	Doubles
← 1999 ·	Vienna Open	· 2001 →

David Prinosil and Sandon Stolle were the defending champions, but Prinosil did not participate this year. Stolle partnered David Adams, losing in the first round.

Yevgeny Kafelnikov and Nenad Zimonjić won the title, defeating Jiří Novák and David Rikl 6–4, 6–4 in the final.

== Seeds ==
1. (South Africa) David Adams / (Australia) Sandon Stolle (first round)
2. (Czech Republic) Jiří Novák / (Czech Republic) David Rikl (final)
3. (Australia) Joshua Eagle / (Australia) Andrew Florent (quarterfinals)
4. (United States) Donald Johnson / (South Africa) Piet Norval (quarterfinals)

== Draw ==
=== Key ===
- Q = Qualifier
- WC = Wild card
- LL = Lucky loser
- Alt = Alternate
- ITF = ITF entry
- PR = Protected ranking
- SR = Special ranking
- SE = Special exempt
- JE = Junior exempt
- JR = Junior Accelerator Programme entrant
- CO = College Accelerator Programme entrant
- NG = Next Gen Accelerator Program entrant
- w/o = Walkover
- r = Retired
- d = Defaulted

=== Draw ===
First round
1	(South Africa) D Adams (Australia) S Stolle	2	4
(Sweden) R Bergh (Sweden) N Kulti	6	6
(Russia) Y Kafelnikov (Serbia and Montenegro) N Zimonjić	6	6
(United States) J-M Gambill (United States) S Humphries	3	3
4	(United States) D Johnson (South Africa) P Norval	6	6^{5}	6
(Spain) T Carbonell (Argentina) D Orsanic	3	7^{7}	2
Q	(France) F Santoro (Czech Republic) C Suk	6	6
WC	(Austria) G Blumauer (Austria) T Buchmayer	2	2
WC	(Austria) S Koubek (Austria) T Strengberger	3	6	6^{5}
WC	(Belarus) M Mirnyi (Russia) M Safin	6	1	7^{7}
(South Africa) M Barnard (South Africa) R Koenig	6	3	4
3	(Australia) J Eagle (Australia) A Florent	3	6	6
LL	(South Africa) C Haggard (Belgium) T Vanhoudt	4	6	6
(Sweden) S Aspelin (Sweden) J Landsberg	6	3	4
(Italy) D Nargiso (Russia) A Olhovskiy	5	4
2	(Czech Republic) J Novák (Czech Republic) D Rikl	7	6

Quarterfinals
(Sweden) R Bergh (Sweden) N Kulti	3	4
(Russia) Y Kafelnikov (Serbia and Montenegro) N Zimonjić	6	6
4	(United States) D Johnson (South Africa) P Norval	4	3
Q	(France) F Santoro (Czech Republic) C Suk	6	6
WC	(Belarus) M Mirnyi (Russia) M Safin	6	7^{7}
3	(Australia) J Eagle (Australia) A Florent	3	6^{4}
LL	(South Africa) C Haggard (Belgium) T Vanhoudt	6	3	0
2	(Czech Republic) J Novák (Czech Republic) D Rikl	2	6	6

Semifinals
(Russia) Y Kafelnikov (Serbia and Montenegro) N Zimonjić	6^{5}	7^{7}	6
Q	(France) F Santoro (Czech Republic) C Suk	7^{7}	6^{1}	4
WC	(Belarus) M Mirnyi (Russia) M Safin	4	6	4
2	(Czech Republic) J Novák (Czech Republic) D Rikl	6	2	6

Final
(Russia) Y Kafelnikov (Serbia and Montenegro) N Zimonjić	6	6
2	(Czech Republic) J Novák (Czech Republic) D Rikl	4	4

== Qualifying ==
=== Qualifying seeds ===
1. (South Africa) Chris Haggard / (Belgium) Tom Vanhoudt (qualifying competition, lucky losers)
2. (Italy) Massimo Bertolini / (Italy) Cristian Brandi (first round)

=== Qualifiers ===
1. (France) Fabrice Santoro / (Czech Republic) Cyril Suk

=== Lucky losers ===
1. (South Africa) Chris Haggard / (Belgium) Tom Vanhoudt

=== Qualifying draw ===
First round
1	(South Africa) Chris Haggard (Belgium) Tom Vanhoudt	6	6
WC	(Austria) Ronald Dueller (Austria) Thiemo Maier	4	1
(France) Fabrice Santoro (Czech Republic) Cyril Suk	6	6
2	(Italy) Massimo Bertolini (Italy) Cristian Brandi	4	3

Qualifying competition
1	(South Africa) Chris Haggard (Belgium) Tom Vanhoudt	6	4	2
(France) Fabrice Santoro (Czech Republic) Cyril Suk	4	6	6
