= 2002 Mutua Madrileña Masters Madrid – Doubles =

Doubles
- 2002 Mutua Madrileña Masters Madrid

Final
- Champions: (The Bahamas) Mark Knowles (Canada) Daniel Nestor
- Runners-up: (India) Mahesh Bhupathi (Belarus) Max Mirnyi
- Score: 6–3, 7–5, 6–0

Events
Singles	Doubles
Madrid Open	· 2003 →

Mark Knowles and Daniel Nestor won in the final 6–3, 7–5, 6–0 against Mahesh Bhupathi and Max Mirnyi.

== Seeds ==
Champion seeds are indicated in bold text while text in italics indicates the round in which those seeds were eliminated. All eight seeded teams received byes to the second round.

1. (The Bahamas) **Mark Knowles** / (Canada) **Daniel Nestor (champions)**
2. (India) Mahesh Bhupathi / (Belarus) Max Mirnyi (final)
3. (Sweden) Jonas Björkman / (Australia) Todd Woodbridge (semifinals)
4. (United States) Bob Bryan / (United States) Mike Bryan (semifinals)
5. (Zimbabwe) Wayne Black / (Zimbabwe) Kevin Ullyett (second round)
6. (Czech Republic) Martin Damm / (Czech Republic) Cyril Suk (quarterfinals)
7. (Australia) Joshua Eagle / (Australia) Sandon Stolle (second round)
8. (Czech Republic) Jiří Novák / (Czech Republic) Radek Štěpánek (second round)

== Draw ==
=== Key ===
- Q = Qualifier
- WC = Wild card
- LL = Lucky loser
- Alt = Alternate
- SE = Special exempt
- PR = Protected ranking
- ITF = ITF entry
- JE = Junior exempt
- w/o = Walkover
- r = Retired
- d = Defaulted
- SR = Special ranking
- NB: The Final was the best of 5 sets while all other rounds were the best of 3 sets.

=== Final ===
Final

1
- (The Bahamas) **Mark Knowles**
- (Canada) **Daniel Nestor**
**6**
**7**
**6**

2
- (India) Mahesh Bhupathi
- (Belarus) Max Mirnyi
3
5
0

=== Top half ===
First round

Second round

Quarterfinals

Semifinals

1
- (The Bahamas) **M Knowles**
- (Canada) **D Nestor**
5
**6**
**6**

- (United States) J-M Gambill
- (Czech Republic) P Pála
6^{2}
1

WC
- (Germany) N Kiefer
- (Romania) A Pavel
**7**
4
4

WC
- (Germany) **N Kiefer**
- (Romania) **A Pavel**
**7^{7}**
**6**

1
- (The Bahamas) **M Knowles**
- (Canada) **D Nestor**
**7**
**6**

- (United States) **R Leach**
- (United States) **B MacPhie**
**6**
6^{4}
**7^{7}**

- (United States) R Leach
- (United States) B MacPhie
5
3

- (South Africa) R Koenig
- (Germany) D Prinosil
4
**7^{7}**
6^{5}

- (United States) **R Leach**
- (United States) **B MacPhie**
**7**
**7^{7}**

7
- (Australia) J Eagle
- (Australia) S Stolle
5
6^{5}

1
- (The Bahamas) **M Knowles**
- (Canada) **D Nestor**
**7^{7}**
**6**

4
- (United States) B Bryan
- (United States) M Bryan
6^{5}
4

4
- (United States) **B Bryan**
- (United States) **M Bryan**
**7^{7}**
**7^{7}**

ALT
- (Brazil) G Kuerten
- (Brazil) A Sá
3
4

- (Chile) F González
- (United States) A Roddick
6^{4}
6^{2}

- (Chile) **F González**
- (United States) **A Roddick**
**6**
**6**

4
- (United States) **B Bryan**
- (United States) **M Bryan**
**7**
6^{4}
**7^{7}**

- (South Africa) **D Adams**
- (United States) **J Palmer**
**6**
3
**6**

- (South Africa) D Adams
- (United States) J Palmer
5
**7^{7}**
6^{4}

- (Argentina) L Arnold
- (Argentina) G Etlis
3
**6**
2

- (South Africa) **D Adams**
- (United States) **J Palmer**
**7^{9}**
**7**

5
- (Zimbabwe) W Black
- (Zimbabwe) K Ullyett
6^{7}
5

=== Bottom half ===
First round

Second round

Quarterfinals

Semifinals

8
- (Czech Republic) J Novák
- (Czech Republic) R Štěpánek
3
2

- (Morocco) Y El Aynaoui
- (France) S Grosjean
**6**
4
3

WC
- (France) **N Escudé**
- (France) **F Santoro**
**6**
**6**

WC
- (France) **N Escudé**
- (France) **F Santoro**
4
**6**
**6**

WC
- (France) N Escudé
- (France) F Santoro

- (Australia) **M Hill**
- (India) **L Paes**
**w/o**

3
- (Sweden) **J Björkman**
- (Australia) **T Woodbridge**
**w/o**

- (Belgium) X Malisse
- (Netherlands) S Schalken

- (Australia) M Hill
- (India) L Paes
2
0

3
- (Sweden) **J Björkman**
- (Australia) **T Woodbridge**
**6**
**6**

3
- (Sweden) J Björkman
- (Australia) T Woodbridge
4
**6**
6^{4}

2
- (India) **M Bhupathi**
- (Belarus) **M Mirnyi**
**6**
2
**7^{7}**

6
- (Czech Republic) **M Damm**
- (Czech Republic) **C Suk**
**6**
**6**

WC
(Russia) M Safin
(Federal Republic of Yugoslavia) N Zimonjić
**6**
3
3

- (South Africa) E Ferreira
- (Czech Republic) D Rikl
4
3

- (South Africa) **E Ferreira**
- (Czech Republic) **D Rikl**
4
**6**
**6**

6
- (Czech Republic) M Damm
- (Czech Republic) C Suk
**6**
5
3

- (France) J Boutter
- (France) M Llodra
6^{2}
5

2
- (India) **M Bhupathi**
- (Belarus) **M Mirnyi**
2
**7**
**6**

- (Russia) **Y Kafelnikov**
- (Czech Republic) **P Vízner**
**7^{7}**
**7**

- (Russia) Y Kafelnikov
- (Czech Republic) P Vízner
6^{5}
5

2
- (India) **M Bhupathi**
- (Belarus) **M Mirnyi**
**7^{7}**
**7**
