= 1999 Eurocard Open – Singles =

Singles
- 1999 Eurocard Open

Final
- Champion: (Sweden) Thomas Enqvist
- Runner-up: (Netherlands) Richard Krajicek
- Score: 6–1, 6–4, 5–7, 7–5

Details
- Draw: 48 (3WC/6Q)
- Seeds: 16

Events
Singles	Doubles
← 1998 ·	Eurocard Open	· 2000 →

Thomas Enqvist defeated the defending champion Richard Krajicek in the final, 6–1, 6–4, 5–7, 7–5 to win the singles tennis title at the 1999 Eurocard Open.

== Seeds ==
A champion seed is indicated in bold text while text in italics indicates the round in which that seed was eliminated. All sixteen seeds received a bye into the second round.

1. (United States) Andre Agassi (semifinals)
2. (Russia) Yevgeny Kafelnikov (second round)
3. (United States) Todd Martin (quarterfinals)
4. (Brazil) Gustavo Kuerten (third round)
5. (United Kingdom) Greg Rusedski (semifinals)
6. (Chile) Marcelo Ríos (quarterfinals)
7. (Germany) Nicolas Kiefer (second round)
8. (Netherlands) Richard Krajicek (final)
9. (Spain) Álex Corretja (third round)
10. (United Kingdom) Tim Henman (second round)
11. (Germany) Tommy Haas (third round)
12. (Ecuador) Nicolás Lapentti (third round)
13. (Sweden) **Thomas Enqvist (champion)**
14. (France) Cédric Pioline (second round)
15. (Slovakia) Karol Kučera (second round)
16. (Sweden) Magnus Norman (third round)

== Draw ==
=== Key ===
- Q = Qualifier
- WC = Wild card
- LL = Lucky loser
- Alt = Alternate
- ITF = ITF entry
- PR = Protected ranking
- SR = Special ranking
- SE = Special exempt
- JE = Junior exempt
- JR = Junior Accelerator Programme entrant
- CO = College Accelerator Programme entrant
- NG = Next Gen Accelerator Program entrant
- w/o = Walkover
- r = Retired
- d = Defaulted

=== Finals ===
Quarterfinals
1	**(United States) Andre Agassi**	**6**	**6**
WC	(Romania) Andrei Pavel	2	1
13	**(Sweden) Thomas Enqvist**	**6**	**6**
6	(Chile) Marcelo Ríos	4	2
5	**(United Kingdom) Greg Rusedski**	4	**7^{12}**	**6**
3	(United States) Todd Martin	**6**	6^{10}	4
8	**(Netherlands) Richard Krajicek**	**6**	**6**
(Argentina) Mariano Zabaleta	3	2

Semifinals
1	(United States) Andre Agassi	3	**6**	0
13	(Sweden) **Thomas Enqvist**	**6**	4	**6**
5	(United Kingdom) Greg Rusedski	4	4
8	(Netherlands) **Richard Krajicek**	**6**	**6**

Final
13	(Sweden) **Thomas Enqvist**	**6**	**6**	5	**7**
8	(Netherlands) Richard Krajicek	1	4	**7**	5

=== Top half ===
==== Section 1 ====
First round
(Australia) **M Philippoussis**	**6**	4	**7**
Q	(Italy) G Pozzi	4	**6**	5
Q	(France) A Clément	5	6^{4}
(Netherlands) **S Schalken**	**7**	**7^{7}**
(Ukraine) A Medvedev	1	1	r
Q	(Czech Republic) **D Vacek**	**6**	**2**
(Brazil) F Meligeni	**6**	3	4
WC	(Romania) **A Pavel**	3	**6**	**6**

Second round
1	(United States) **A Agassi**	**6**	**6**
(Australia) M Philippoussis	2	4
(Netherlands) **S Schalken**	**7**	**6**
15	(Slovakia) K Kučera	5	1
10	(United Kingdom) T Henman	3	1
Q	(Czech Republic) **D Vacek**	**6**	**6**
WC	(Romania) **A Pavel**	**6**
7	(Germany) N Kiefer	5	r

Third round
1	(United States) **A Agassi**	**6**	**6**
(Netherlands) S Schalken	4	2
Q	(Czech Republic) D Vacek	4	5
WC	(Romania) **A Pavel**	**6**	**7**

Quarterfinals
1	(United States) **A Agassi**	**6**	**6**
WC	(Romania) A Pavel	2	1

==== Section 2 ====
First round
(Morocco) H Arazi	5	**6**	3
(Spain) **Á Costa**	**7**	2	**6**
WC	(United States) **M Chang**	3	**7^{7}**	**6**
WC	(Germany) R Schüttler	**6**	6^{4}	2
(Sweden) T Johansson	**7^{7}**	6^{4}	1
(Slovakia) **D Hrbatý**	6^{3}	**7^{7}**	**6**
(France) **S Grosjean**	**6**	**6**
(Spain) F Vicente	2	2

Second round
4	(Brazil) **G Kuerten**	3	**7**	**6**
(Spain) Á Costa	**6**	5	3
WC	(United States) M Chang	4	2
13	(Sweden) **T Enqvist**	**6**	**6**
12	(Ecuador) **N Lapentti**	3	**6**	**6**
(Slovakia) D Hrbatý	**6**	4	3
(France) S Grosjean	3	4
6	(Chile) **M Ríos**	**6**	**6**

Third round
4	(Brazil) G Kuerten	4	**7**	4
13	(Sweden) **T Enqvist**	**6**	5	**6**
12	(Ecuador) N Lapentti	4	3
6	(Chile) **M Ríos**	**6**	**6**

Quarterfinals
13	(Sweden) **T Enqvist**	**6**	**6**
6	(Chile) M Ríos	4	2

=== Bottom half ===
==== Section 3 ====
First round
Q	(Italy) L Tieleman	6^{4}	**7^{8}**	2
(Sweden) **M Larsson**	**7^{7}**	6^{6}	**6**
Q	(United States) J Gimelstob	4	**6**	4
(South Africa) **W Ferreira**	**6**	4	**6**
(Croatia) G Ivanišević	2	**6**	6^{2}
(Czech Republic) **J Novák**	**6**	3	**7^{7}**
(France) **F Santoro**	**6**	**6**
(Morocco) Y El Aynaoui	2	4

Second round
5	(United Kingdom) **G Rusedski**	**w/o**
(Sweden) M Larsson
(South Africa) W Ferreira	2	6^{2}
11	(Germany) **T Haas**	**6**	**7^{7}**
14	(France) C Pioline	4	**6**	3
(Czech Republic) **J Novák**	**6**	3	**6**
(France) F Santoro	4	2
3	(United States) **T Martin**	**6**	**6**

Third round
5	(United Kingdom) **G Rusedski**	**6**	**6**
11	(Germany) T Haas	4	3
(Czech Republic) J Novák	2	4
3	(United States) **T Martin**	**6**	**6**

Quarterfinals
5	(United Kingdom) **G Rusedski**	4	**7^{12}**	**6**
3	(United States) T Martin	**6**	6^{10}	4

==== Section 4 ====
First round
Q	(United States) **C Woodruff**	**6**	**6**
(Spain) F Clavet	1	4
(United States) **J Courier**	4	**7^{8}**	**6**
(Switzerland) M Rosset	**6**	6^{6}	2
(Australia) L Hewitt	6^{7}	**6**	2
(Russia) **M Safin**	**7^{9}**	3	**6**
(Argentina) **M Zabaleta**	**6**	3	**6**
(United States) V Spadea	4	**6**	1

Second round
8	(Netherlands) **R Krajicek**	**6**	**7^{7}**
Q	(United States) C Woodruff	4	6^{3}
(United States) J Courier	3	**7^{7}**	3
9	(Spain) **Á Corretja**	**6**	6^{5}	**6**
16	(Sweden) **M Norman**	**6**	**7**
(Russia) M Safin	4	5
(Argentina) **M Zabaleta**	**6**	**6**
2	(Russia) Y Kafelnikov	3	3

Third round
8	(Netherlands) **R Krajicek**	**7^{7}**	**7^{7}**
9	(Spain) Á Corretja	6^{4}	6^{5}
16	(Sweden) M Norman	3	4
(Argentina) **M Zabaleta**	**6**	**6**

Quarterfinals
8	(Netherlands) **R Krajicek**	**6**	**6**
(Argentina) M Zabaleta	3	2

== Qualifying ==
=== Qualifying seeds ===
1. (Austria) Stefan Koubek (qualifying competition)
2. (France) Arnaud Di Pasquale (first round)
3. (France) **Arnaud Clément (qualified)**
4. (Czech Republic) **Daniel Vacek (qualified)**
5. (United States) Jan-Michael Gambill (qualifying competition)
6. (Sweden) Jonas Björkman (first round)
7. (Slovakia) Ján Krošlák (first round)
8. (United States) **Chris Woodruff (qualified)**
9. (Germany) David Prinosil (first round)
10. (Argentina) Guillermo Cañas (first round)
11. (Netherlands) John van Lottum (first round, retired)
12. (Zimbabwe) Byron Black (first round)

=== Qualifiers ===
1. (Italy) **Laurence Tieleman**
2. (United States) **Justin Gimelstob**
3. (France) **Arnaud Clément**
4. (Czech Republic) **Daniel Vacek**
5. (Italy) **Gianluca Pozzi**
6. (United States) **Chris Woodruff**

=== Qualifying draw ===
==== First qualifier ====
First round
1	**(Austria) Stefan Koubek**	**7**	**7**
WC	(Germany) Michael Berrer	6	5
**(Italy) Laurence Tieleman**	**7**	2
11	(Netherlands) John van Lottum	5	0^{r}

Qualifying competition
1	(Austria) Stefan Koubek	4	3
**(Italy) Laurence Tieleman**	**6**	**6**

==== Second qualifier ====
First round
2	(France) Arnaud Di Pasquale	3	2
**(Australia) Wayne Arthurs**	**6**	**6**
**(United States) Justin Gimelstob**	3	**7**	**6**
12	(Zimbabwe) Byron Black	**6**	6	1

Qualifying competition
(Australia) Wayne Arthurs	6	2
**(United States) Justin Gimelstob**	**7**	**6**

==== Third qualifier ====
First round
3	**(France) Arnaud Clément**	6	**7**	**7**
WC	(Germany) Christian Vinck	**7**	5	5
**(Australia) Mark Woodforde**	**7**	**6**
9	(Germany) David Prinosil	6	3

Qualifying competition
3	**(France) Arnaud Clément**	**6**	**6**
(Australia) Mark Woodforde	3	3

==== Fourth qualifier ====
First round
4	**(Czech Republic) Daniel Vacek**	**6**	**6**
WC	(Germany) Björn Phau	4	3
**(Germany) Michael Kohlmann**	5	**6**	**6**
10	(Argentina) Guillermo Cañas	**7**	3	2

Qualifying competition
4	**(Czech Republic) Daniel Vacek**	4	**7**	**7**
(Germany) Michael Kohlmann	**6**	6	6

==== Fifth qualifier ====
First round
5	**(United States) Jan-Michael Gambill**	**6**	**6**
(Canada) Sébastien Lareau	4	3
**(Italy) Gianluca Pozzi**	**6**	**7**
7	(Slovakia) Ján Krošlák	2	5

Qualifying competition
5	(United States) Jan-Michael Gambill	3	**6**	3
**(Italy) Gianluca Pozzi**	**6**	4	**6**

==== Sixth qualifier ====
First round
6	(Sweden) Jonas Björkman	5	3
WC	**(Switzerland) Ivo Heuberger**	**7**	**6**
(Netherlands) Peter Wessels	3	**6**	4
8	**(United States) Chris Woodruff**	**6**	4	**6**

Qualifying competition
WC	(Switzerland) Ivo Heuberger	3	4
8	**(United States) Chris Woodruff**	**6**	**6**
