= Zbynek Mlynarik =

Austrian tennis player

- Full name: Zbynek Mlynarik
- Country (sports): Austria
- Born: 24 April 1977 (age 48); Děčín, Czechoslovakia
- Prize money: $112,394

Singles
- Career record: 0–1
- Career titles: 0
- Highest ranking: No. 206 (10 September 2001)

Doubles
- Highest ranking: No. 409 (4 October 2004)

Zbynek Mlynarik (born 24 April 1977; Czech: Zbyněk Mlynárik) is a former professional tennis player from Austria.

== Biography ==
Mlynarik is originally from Czechoslovakia, born in Děčín, a town now part of the Czech Republic. Based in Vienna, he began competing professionally from 1998. He made his only main draw appearance on the ATP Tour at his home event, the 2000 CA-TennisTrophy, where he was beaten the first round by eighth seed Cédric Pioline. At Challenger level he won two titles, the singles at Lübeck in 2001 and the doubles at Canberra in 2004. He competed in the qualifying draws of all four Grand Slam tournaments.

Since retiring from the tour he has lived in the United States. He has worked as a coach and runs My Vienna, a gelato cafe in Beverly Hills, which opened in 2012.

== Challenger titles ==
=== Singles: (1) ===
No.	Year	Tournament	Surface	Opponent	Score
1.	2001	Lübeck, Germany	Carpet	(Belgium) Dick Norman	7–6^{(6)}, 6–7^{(4)}, 6–4

=== Doubles: (1) ===
No.	Year	Tournament	Surface	Partner	Opponents	Score
1.	2004	Canberra, Australia	Clay	(Poland) Łukasz Kubot	(Australia) Stephen Huss (Australia) Peter Luczak	7–6^{(3)}, 6–2
