= 2002 Mutua Madrileña Masters Madrid =

- Date: 14–20 October
- Edition: 1st
- Surface: Hard / Indoor
- Location: Madrid, Spain
- Venue: Madrid Arena

Champions

Singles
- (United States) Andre Agassi

Doubles
- (The Bahamas) Mark Knowles / (Canada) Daniel Nestor
- Madrid Open

The 2002 Mutua Madrileña Masters Madrid was a men's tennis tournament played on indoor hard courts. It was the 1st edition of the Madrid Masters and was part of the Tennis Masters Series of the 2002 ATP Tour. It took place at the Madrid Arena in Madrid, Spain from 14 October through 20 October 2002. Second-seeded Andre Agassi won the singles title.

== Finals ==
=== Singles ===
(United States) Andre Agassi defeated (Czech Republic) Jiří Novák by walkover

- It was Agassi's 5th title of the year and the 55th of his career. It was his 3rd Masters Series title of the year and his 15th overall.

=== Doubles ===
(The Bahamas) Mark Knowles / (Canada) Daniel Nestor defeated (India) Mahesh Bhupathi / (Belarus) Max Mirnyi 6–3, 7–5, 6–0

- It was Knowles' 7th title of the year and the 24th of his career. It was Nestor's 6th title of the year and the 26th of his career.
