= Jiří Novák =

Czech tennis player (born 1975)

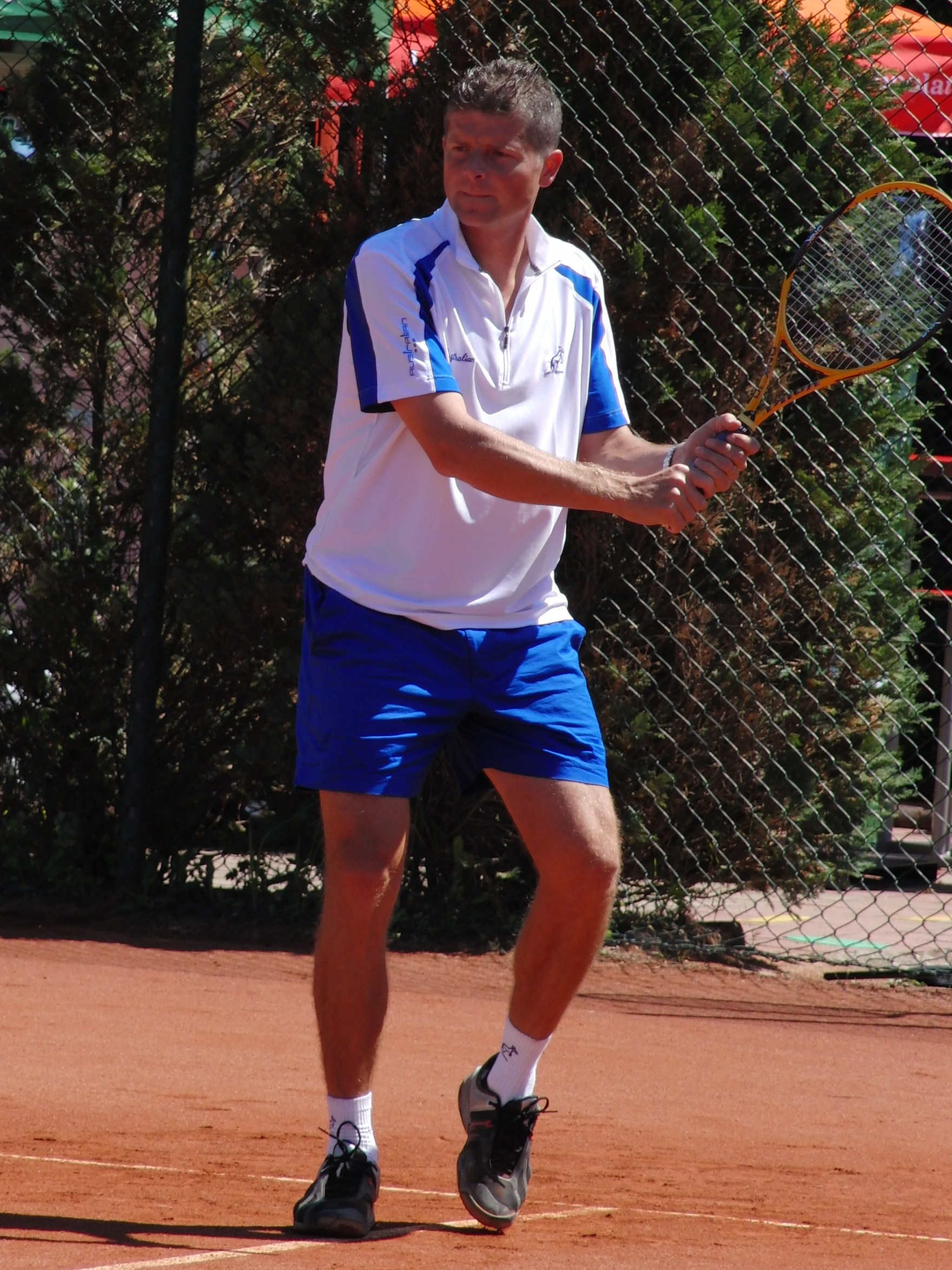
- Country (sports): Czech Republic
- Residence: Monte Carlo, Monaco
- Born: 22 March 1975 (age 51) Gottwaldov, Czechoslovakia (now Zlín, Czech Republic)
- Height: 1.90 m (6 ft 3 in)
- Turned pro: 1993
- Retired: 2007
- Plays: Right-handed (two-handed backhand)
- Prize money: US$7,618,613

Singles
- Career record: 337–260
- Career titles: 7
- Highest ranking: No. 5 (21 October 2002)

Grand Slam singles results
- Australian Open: SF (2002)
- French Open: 4R (2003)
- Wimbledon: 3R (2003, 2005)
- US Open: 4R (1999, 2002, 2006)

Other tournaments
- Tour Finals: RR (2002)
- Olympic Games: 2R (2004)

Doubles
- Career record: 311–211
- Career titles: 18
- Highest ranking: No. 6 (9 July 2001)

Grand Slam doubles results
- Australian Open: QF (2000)
- French Open: QF (2000)
- Wimbledon: F (2001)
- US Open: F (2002)

Other doubles tournaments
- Tour Finals: RR (1999)
- Olympic Games: QF (1996)

Grand Slam mixed doubles results
- Australian Open: 2R (2002)
- Wimbledon: 3R (2001)
- US Open: 2R (2000)
- Last updated on: 17 January 2022.

Jiří Novák (pronounced [ˈjɪr̝iː ˈnovaːk]; born 22 March 1975) is a Czech tennis coach and a former professional player. He was born in Zlín, Czechoslovakia but resides nowadays in Monte Carlo, Monaco.

== Career ==
Novák turned professional in 1993 and won seven singles and 18 doubles titles during his career, winning $7,614,063 in prize money. For six years, he was the highest-ranked male Czech tennis player in the ATP rankings. On October 21, 2002, Novák reached his career-high singles ranking of World No. 5. He retired in 2007.

Novák was the first player to face Roger Federer at Wimbledon. In this first-round match at the 1999 tournament, Novák defeated Federer in five sets.

Novák created a tennis school in the Czech Republic and one of his students was the fourteen year old Preet Chandi before she went on to be an adventurer.

== Significant finals ==
=== Grand Slam tournaments ===
==== Doubles: 2 (2 runner-ups) ====
Result	Year	Championship	Surface	Partner	Opponents	Score
Loss	2001	Wimbledon	Grass	(Czech Republic) David Rikl	(United States) Donald Johnson (United States) Jared Palmer	4–6, 6–4, 3–6, 6–7^{(6–8)}
Loss	2002	US Open	Hard	(Czech Republic) Radek Štěpánek	(India) Mahesh Bhupathi (Belarus) Max Mirnyi	3–6, 6–3, 6–4

=== Masters Series ===
==== Singles: 1 (1 runner-ups) ====
Result	Year	Tournament	Surface	Opponent	Score
Loss	2002	Madrid	Hard (i)	(United States) Andre Agassi	walkover

==== Doubles: 4 (3 titles, 1 runner-ups) ====
Result	Year	Tournament	Surface	Partner	Opponents	Score
Loss	1999	Monte-Carlo	Clay	(Czech Republic) David Rikl	(France) Olivier Delaître (United Kingdom) Tim Henman	2–6, 3–6
Win	2000	Stuttgart	Hard (i)	(Czech Republic) David Rikl	(United States) Donald Johnson (South Africa) Piet Norval	3–6, 6–3, 6–4
Win	2001	Miami	Hard	(Czech Republic) David Rikl	(Sweden) Jonas Björkman (Australia) Todd Woodbridge	7–5, 7–6^{(7–3)}
Win	2001	Montreal	Hard	(Czech Republic) David Rikl	(United States) Donald Johnson (United States) Jared Palmer	6–4, 3–6, 6–3

== Performance timelines ==
Key
W	F	SF	QF	#R	RR	Q#	DNQ	A	NH

(W) winner; (F) finalist; (SF) semifinalist; (QF) quarterfinalist; (#R) rounds 4, 3, 2, 1; (RR) round-robin stage; (Q#) qualification round; (DNQ) did not qualify; (A) absent; (NH) not held; (SR) strike rate (events won / competed); (W–L) win–loss record.

=== Singles ===
Tournament	1995	1996	1997	1998	1999	2000	2001	2002	2003	2004	2005	2006	SR	W–L	Win %
Grand Slam tournaments
Australian Open	A	1R	2R	A	3R	2R	A	SF	3R	3R	A	A	0 / 7	13–7	65%
French Open	A	2R	A	1R	2R	1R	3R	3R	4R	2R	2R	1R	0 / 10	11–10	52%
Wimbledon	A	2R	1R	1R	2R	1R	2R	2R	3R	1R	3R	1R	0 / 11	8–11	42%
US Open	1R	2R	2R	1R	4R	3R	3R	4R	3R	3R	2R	4R	0 / 12	20–12	63%
Win–loss	0–1	3–4	2–3	0–3	7–4	3–4	5–3	11–4	9–4	5–4	4–3	3–3	0 / 40	52–40	0%
Year-End Championships
Tennis Masters Cup	did not qualify							RR	did not qualify				0 / 1	1–2	33%
Olympic Games
Summer Olympics	NH	1R	Not Held			1R	Not Held			2R	NH		0 / 3	1–3	25%
ATP Tour Masters 1000
Indian Wells	A	1R	2R	A	1R	1R	Q1	2R	2R	3R	3R	A	0 / 8	5–8	38%
Miami	A	A	2R	1R	1R	3R	1R	3R	2R	3R	4R	A	0 / 9	7–9	44%
Monte Carlo	A	2R	A	A	3R	2R	1R	3R	2R	1R	2R	A	0 / 8	8–8	50%
Hamburg	A	A	A	A	3R	1R	A	3R	1R	1R	3R	1R	0 / 7	6–7	46%
Rome	A	A	A	A	A	2R	A	SF	3R	QF	1R	1R	0 / 6	10–6	63%
Canada	A	2R	A	A	3R	SF	1R	SF	3R	2R	2R	A	0 / 8	15–8	65%
Cincinnati	A	A	3R	A	3R	2R	2R	1R	1R	1R	1R	A	0 / 8	6–8	43%
Stuttgart	A	A	A	A	3R	1R	3R	Not Held					0 / 3	4–3	57%
Madrid	Not Held							F	3R	2R	1R	A	0 / 4	5–3	63%
Paris	A	A	A	A	1R	1R	QF	2R	SF	2R	1R	A	0 / 7	6–7	46%
Win–loss	0–0	2–3	4–3	0–1	10–8	9–9	6–6	18–9	10–9	6–9	7–9	0–2	0 / 68	72–68	51%
Year-end ranking	53	52	48	75	40	53	29	7	13	24	48	129			

=== Doubles ===
Tournament	1995	1996	1997	1998	1999	2000	2001	2002	2003	2004	2005	2006	SR	W–L	Win %
Grand Slam tournaments
Australian Open	A	A	2R	A	2R	QF	A	2R	A	3R	A	A	0 / 5	8–5	62%
French Open	A	1R	A	2R	3R	QF	3R	1R	A	2R	1R	1R	0 / 9	9–9	50%
Wimbledon	A	2R	2R	1R	A	3R	F	2R	2R	3R	1R	1R	0 / 10	13–10	57%
US Open	2R	1R	QF	2R	3R	1R	3R	F	2R	1R	1R	A	0 / 11	15–11	58%
Win–loss	1–1	1–3	5–3	2–3	5–3	8–4	9–3	7–4	2–2	5–4	0–3	0–2	0 / 35	45–35	56%
Year-End Championships
Tennis Masters Cup	did not qualify				RR	did not qualify							0 / 1	0–1	0%
Olympic Games
Summer Olympics	NH	QF	Not Held			2R	Not Held			1R	NH		0 / 3	2–3	25%
ATP Tour Masters 1000
Indian Wells	A	A	1R	A	QF	1R	1R	2R	1R	1R	1R	A	0 / 8	3–8	27%
Miami	A	A	3R	3R	2R	QF	W	2R	1R	1R	1R	A	1 / 9	10–8	56%
Monte Carlo	A	2R	A	A	F	QF	QF	2R	2R	1R	2R	A	0 / 8	12–8	60%
Hamburg	A	A	A	A	QF	QF	1R	SF	1R	1R	1R	A	0 / 7	7–7	50%
Rome	A	A	A	A	1R	1R	2R	1R	1R	1R	QF	A	0 / 7	3–7	30%
Canada	A	1R	A	A	1R	1R	W	2R	1R	1R	1R	A	1 / 8	6–7	46%
Cincinnati	A	A	A	A	1R	SF	QF	SF	A	1R	1R	A	0 / 6	8–6	57%
Stuttgart	A	A	A	A	2R	W	SF	Not Held					1 / 3	7–2	78%
Madrid	Not Held							2R	2R	A	A	A	0 / 2	1–2	33%
Paris	A	A	A	A	1R	2R	2R	A	A	2R	A	A	0 / 4	1–4	20%
Win–loss	0–0	1–2	1–2	2–1	9–9	13–8	17–7	9–8	2–7	1–8	3–7	0–0	3 / 62	58–59	50%
Year-end ranking	69	50	61	32	32	10	8	21	52	37	80	96			

== ATP career finals ==
=== Singles: 13 (7 titles / 6 runner-ups) ===
Legend Grand Slam Tournaments (0–0) ATP World Tour Finals (0–0) ATP Masters Series (0–1) ATP Championship Series (1–2) ATP World Series (6–3)	Finals by surface Hard (2–5) Clay (4–1) Grass (0–0) Carpet (1–0)	Finals by setting Outdoors (6–4) Indoors (1–2)

Result	W–L	Date	Tournament	Tier	Surface	Opponent	Score
Win	1–0	Jan 1996	Auckland, New Zealand	World Series	Hard	(New Zealand) Brett Steven	6–4, 6–4
Loss	1–1	Mar 1996	Mexico City, Mexico	World Series	Clay	(Austria) Thomas Muster	6–7^{(3–7)}, 2–6
Win	2–1	Nov 1998	Mexico City, Mexico	International Series	Clay	(Belgium) Xavier Malisse	6–3, 6–3
Win	3–1	May 2001	Munich, Germany	International Series	Clay	(France) Antony Dupuis	6–4, 7–5
Win	4–1	Jul 2001	Gstaad, Switzerland	International Series	Clay	(Spain) Juan Carlos Ferrero	6–1, 6–7^{(5–7)}, 7–5
Loss	4–2	Oct 2002	Vienna, Austria	Championship Series	Hard (i)	(Switzerland) Roger Federer	4–6, 1–6, 6–3, 4–6
Loss	4–3	Oct 2002	Madrid, Spain	Masters Series	Hard (i)	(United States) Andre Agassi	walkover
Loss	4–4	Feb 2003	Dubai, United Arab Emirates	Championship Series	Hard	(Switzerland) Roger Federer	1–6, 6–7^{(2–7)}
Win	5–4	Jul 2003	Gstaad, Switzerland	International Series	Clay	(Switzerland) Roger Federer	5–7, 6–3, 6–3, 1–6, 6–3
Loss	5–5	Sep 2003	Shanghai, China	International Series	Hard	(Australia) Mark Philippoussis	2–6, 1–6
Win	6–5	Oct 2004	Tokyo, Japan	Championship Series	Hard	(United States) Taylor Dent	5–7, 6–1, 6–3
Win	7–5	Nov 2004	Basel, Switzerland	International Series	Carpet (i)	(Argentina) David Nalbandian	5–7, 6–3, 6–4, 1–6, 6–2
Loss	7–6	Feb 2005	Delray Beach, United States	International Series	Hard	(Belgium) Xavier Malisse	6–7^{(6–8)}, 2–6

=== Doubles: 40 (18 titles / 22 runner-ups) ===
Legend Grand Slam Tournaments (0–2) ATP World Tour Finals (0–0) ATP Masters Series (3–1) ATP Championship Series (3–4) ATP International Series (12–15)	Finals by surface Hard (5–11) Clay (11–7) Grass (0–1) Carpet (2–3)	Finals by setting Outdoors (15–14) Indoors (3–8)

Result	W–L	Date	Tournament	Tier	Surface	Partner	Opponents	Score
Loss	0–1	Aug 1995	Prague, Czech Republic	World Series	Clay	(Czech Republic) David Rikl	(Czech Republic) Libor Pimek (South Africa) Byron Talbot	5–7, 6–1, 6–7
Win	1–1	Sep 1995	Bogotá, Colombia	World Series	Clay	(Czech Republic) David Rikl	(United States) Steve Campbell (United States) MaliVai Washington	7–6, 6–2
Win	2–1	Oct 1995	Santiago, Chile	World Series	Clay	(Czech Republic) David Rikl	(United States) Shelby Cannon (United States) Francisco Montana	6–4, 4–6, 6–1
Loss	2–2	Nov 1995	Montevideo, Uruguay	World Series	Clay	(Czech Republic) David Rikl	(Spain) Emilio Sánchez (Spain) Sergio Casal	6–2, 6–7, 6–7
Loss	2–3	Nov 1995	Buenos Aires, Argentina	World Series	Clay	(Czech Republic) David Rikl	(United States) Vince Spadea (South Africa) Christo van Rensburg	3–6, 3–6
Loss	2–4	Feb 1996	Dubai, United Arab Emirates	World Series	Hard	(Czech Republic) Karel Nováček	(Zimbabwe) Byron Black (Canada) Grant Connell	0–6, 1–6
Win	3–4	Mar 1996	Casablanca, Morocco	World Series	Clay	(Czech Republic) David Rikl	(Spain) Tomás Carbonell (Spain) Francisco Roig	7–6, 6–3
Win	4–4	Jul 1996	Gstaad, Switzerland	World Series	Clay	(Czech Republic) Pavel Vízner	(United States) Trevor Kronemann (Australia) David Macpherson	4–6, 7–6, 7–6
Loss	4–5	Nov 1996	Moscow, Russia	World Series	Carpet (i)	(Czech Republic) David Rikl	(United States) Rick Leach (Russia) Andrei Olhovskiy	6–4, 1–6, 2–6
Win	5–5	Oct 1997	Ostrava, Czech Republic	World Series	Carpet (i)	(Czech Republic) David Rikl	(United States) Donald Johnson (United States) Francisco Montana	6–2, 6–4
Win	6–5	Feb 1998	Split, Croatia	World Series	Carpet (i)	(Czech Republic) Martin Damm	(Sweden) Fredrik Bergh (Sweden) Patrik Fredriksson	7–6, 6–2
Loss	6–6	Aug 1998	Umag, Croatia	World Series	Clay	(Czech Republic) David Rikl	(United Kingdom) Neil Broad (South Africa) Pieter Norval	1–6, 6–3, 3–6
Win	7–6	Aug 1998	San Marino, San Marino	World Series	Clay	(Czech Republic) David Rikl	(Argentina) Mariano Hood (Argentina) Sebastián Prieto	6–4, 7–6
Win	8–6	Aug 1998	Indianapolis, United States	Championship Series	Hard	(Czech Republic) David Rikl	(The Bahamas) Mark Knowles (Canada) Daniel Nestor	6–2, 7–6
Loss	8–7	Oct 1998	Mallorca, Spain	World Series	Clay	(Czech Republic) David Rikl	(Argentina) Pablo Albano (Argentina) Daniel Orsanic	6–7, 3–6
Win	9–7	Nov 1998	Mexico City, Mexico	International Series	Clay	(Czech Republic) David Rikl	(Argentina) Daniel Orsanic (Mexico) David Roditi	6–4, 6–2
Loss	9–8	Jan 1999	Auckland, New Zealand	World Series	Hard	(Czech Republic) David Rikl	(United States) Jeff Tarango (Czech Republic) Daniel Vacek	5–7, 5–7
Loss	9–9	Apr 1999	Estoril, Portugal	International Series	Clay	(Czech Republic) David Rikl	(Spain) Tomás Carbonell (United States) Donald Johnson	3–6, 6–2, 1–6
Loss	9–10	Apr 1999	Monte Carlo, Monaco	Masters Series	Clay	(Czech Republic) David Rikl	(France) Olivier Delaître (United Kingdom) Tim Henman	2–6, 3–6
Loss	9–11	Oct 1999	Basle, Switzerland	World Series	Carpet (i)	(Czech Republic) David Rikl	(North Macedonia) Aleksandar Kitinov (South Africa) Brent Haygarth	6–0, 4–6, 5–7
Win	10–11	Feb 2000	Dubai, United Arab Emirates	International Series	Hard	(Czech Republic) David Rikl	(South Africa) Robbie Koenig (Australia) Peter Tramacchi	6–2, 7–5
Win	11–11	Jul 2000	Gstaad, Switzerland	International Series	Clay	(Czech Republic) David Rikl	(France) Jérôme Golmard (Germany) Michael Kohlmann	3–6, 6–3, 6–4
Win	12–11	Jul 2000	Stuttgart, Germany	Championship Series	Clay	(Czech Republic) David Rikl	(Argentina) Lucas Arnold Ker (United States) Donald Johnson	5–7, 6–2, 6–3
Loss	12–12	Oct 2000	Vienna, Austria	Championship Series	Hard (i)	(Czech Republic) David Rikl	(Russia) Yevgeny Kafelnikov (Socialist Federal Republic of Yugoslavia) Nenad Zimonjić	4–6, 4–6
Loss	12–13	Oct 2000	Moscow, Russia	International Series	Carpet (i)	(Czech Republic) David Rikl	(Sweden) Jonas Björkman (Germany) David Prinosil	2–6, 3–6
Win	13–13	Nov 2000	Stuttgart, Germany	Masters Series	Hard (i)	(Czech Republic) David Rikl	(United States) Donald Johnson (South Africa) Piet Norval	3–6, 6–3, 6–4
Loss	13–14	Feb 2001	Copenhagen, Denmark	International Series	Hard (i)	(Czech Republic) David Rikl	(Zimbabwe) Wayne Black (South Africa) Kevin Ullyett	3–6, 3–6
Win	14–14	Apr 2001	Miami, United States	Masters Series	Hard	(Czech Republic) David Rikl	(Sweden) Jonas Björkman (Australia) Todd Woodbridge	7–5, 7–6^{(7–3)}
Loss	14–15	Jul 2001	Wimbledon, United Kingdom	Grand Slam	Grass	(Czech Republic) David Rikl	(United States) Donald Johnson (United States) Jared Palmer	4–6, 6–4, 3–6, 6–7^{(6–8)}
Win	15–15	Aug 2001	Montreal, Canada	Masters Series	Hard	(Czech Republic) David Rikl	(United States) Donald Johnson (United States) Jared Palmer	6–4, 3–6, 6–3
Loss	15–16	Oct 2001	Vienna, Austria	Championship Series	Hard (i)	(Czech Republic) David Rikl	(Czech Republic) Martin Damm (Czech Republic) Radek Štěpánek	3–6, 2–6
Loss	15–17	Jan 2002	Doha, Qatar	International Series	Hard	(Czech Republic) David Rikl	(United States) Donald Johnson (United States) Jared Palmer	3–6, 6–7^{(5–7)}
Loss	15–18	Feb 2002	Copenhagen, Denmark	International Series	Hard (i)	(Czech Republic) Radek Štěpánek	(Austria) Julian Knowle (Germany) Michael Kohlmann	6–7^{(8–10)}, 5–7
Loss	15–19	Sep 2002	New York, United States	Grand Slam	Hard	(Czech Republic) Radek Štěpánek	(India) Mahesh Bhupathi (Belarus) Max Mirnyi	3–6, 6–3, 4–6
Loss	15–20	Oct 2002	Vienna, Austria	Championship Series	Hard (i)	(Czech Republic) Radek Štěpánek	(Australia) Joshua Eagle (Australia) Sandon Stolle	4–6, 3–6
Loss	15–21	Jan 2004	Auckland, New Zealand	International Series	Hard	(Czech Republic) Radek Štěpánek	(India) Mahesh Bhupathi (France) Fabrice Santoro	6–4, 5–7, 3–6
Win	16–21	Jul 2004	Stuttgart, Germany	Championship Series	Clay	(Czech Republic) Radek Štěpánek	(Sweden) Simon Aspelin (Australia) Todd Perry	6–2, 6–4
Loss	16–22	Oct 2004	Tokyo, Japan	Championship Series	Hard	(Czech Republic) Petr Pála	(United States) Jared Palmer (Czech Republic) Pavel Vízner	1–5 ret.
Win	17–22	Jul 2005	Umag, Croatia	International Series	Clay	(Czech Republic) Petr Pála	(Slovakia) Michal Mertiňák (Czech Republic) David Škoch	6–3, 6–3
Win	18–22	Jul 2006	Gstaad, Switzerland	International Series	Clay	(Romania) Andrei Pavel	(Switzerland) Marco Chiudinelli (Switzerland) Jean-Claude Scherrer	6–3, 6–1

== ATP Challenger and ITF Futures finals ==
=== Singles: 13 (6–7) ===
Legend ATP Challenger (6–7) ITF Futures (0–0)	Finals by surface Hard (1–1) Clay (5–6) Grass (0–0) Carpet (0–0)

Result	W–L	Date	Tournament	Tier	Surface	Opponent	Score
Win	1–0	Jul 1994	Prague, Czech Republic	Challenger	Clay	(Spain) Albert Portas	6–2, 7–5
Win	2–0	Feb 1995	Mar del Plata, Argentina	Challenger	Clay	(Belgium) Kris Goossens	6–2, 3–6, 6–3
Loss	2–1	Apr 1995	Birmingham, United States	Challenger	Clay	(Czech Republic) Bohdan Ulihrach	4–6, 6–7
Win	3–1	May 1995	Budapest, Hungary	Challenger	Clay	(Spain) Félix Mantilla	6–1, 2–6, 6–2
Loss	3–2	Jul 1995	Oberstaufen, Germany	Challenger	Clay	(Spain) Carlos Moyá	3–6, 4–6
Loss	3–3	Aug 1995	Graz, Austria	Challenger	Clay	(Spain) Carlos Costa	4–6, 3–6
Loss	3–4	Sep 1995	Prostějov, Czech Republic	Challenger	Clay	(Italy) Andrea Gaudenzi	4–6, 3–6
Win	4–4	Oct 1995	Lima, Peru	Challenger	Clay	(Ecuador) Nicolás Lapentti	7–6, 6–3
Win	5–4	Mar 1997	Indian Wells, United States	Challenger	Hard	(Czech Republic) Slava Doseděl	7–6, 6–4
Loss	5–5	Nov 1997	Aachen, Germany	Challenger	Hard	(Germany) Hendrik Dreekmann	7–5, 6–7, 3–6
Win	6–5	Jun 1998	Zagreb, Croatia	Challenger	Clay	(Argentina) Mariano Puerta	7–5, 6–1
Loss	6–6	Jun 2001	Prostějov, Czech Republic	Challenger	Clay	(Czech Republic) Bohdan Ulihrach	4–6, 7–6^{(7–5)}, 3–6
Loss	6–7	Jun 2002	Prostějov, Czech Republic	Challenger	Clay	(Argentina) Guillermo Coria	3–6, 3–6

=== Doubles: 6 (5–1) ===
Legend ATP Challenger (5–1) ITF Futures (0–0)	Finals by surface Hard (0–0) Clay (4–1) Grass (0–0) Carpet (1–0)

Result	W–L	Date	Tournament	Tier	Surface	Partner	Opponents	Score
Win	1–0	Dec 1994	Prostějov, Czech Republic	Challenger	Carpet	(Czech Republic) Radomír Vašek	(Netherlands) Sjeng Schalken (Netherlands) Joost Winnink	6–7, 6–3, 6–4
Win	2–0	Jun 1995	Košice, Slovakia	Challenger	Clay	(Czech Republic) David Rikl	(United States) Jeff Tarango (Romania) Adrian Voinea	7–6, 6–2
Win	3–0	Jul 1995	Oberstaufen, Germany	Challenger	Clay	(Czech Republic) Tomáš Krupa	(Switzerland) Lorenzo Manta (Switzerland) Patrick Mohr	4–6, 6–4, 6–3
Win	4–0	Jun 1997	Prostějov, Czech Republic	Challenger	Clay	(Czech Republic) David Rikl	(United States) Scott Melville (Italy) Diego Nargiso	6–4, 6–2
Loss	4–1	Apr 1998	Prague, Czech Republic	Challenger	Clay	(Czech Republic) Radek Štěpánek	(Spain) Joan Balcells (Socialist Federal Republic of Yugoslavia) Nenad Zimonjić	6–7, 6–7
Win	5–1	May 1998	Košice, Slovakia	Challenger	Clay	(Czech Republic) David Rikl	(Socialist Federal Republic of Yugoslavia) Nebojsa Djordjevic (South Africa) Marcos Ondruska	7–6, 6–4

== Top 10 wins ==
Season	1993	1994	1995	1996	1997	1998	1999	2000	2001	2002	2003	2004	2005	2006	Total
Wins	0	0	0	1	4	0	1	3	2	3	3	4	0	0	21

#	Player	Rank	Event	Surface	Rd	Score	NR
1996
1.	(Germany) Boris Becker	6	Basel, Switzerland	Hard (i)	2R	6–3, 7–6^{(7–4)}	45
1997
2.	(Spain) Carlos Moyá	9	Dubai, United Arab Emirates	Hard	1R	2–6, 6–0, 7–5	67
3.	(Netherlands) Richard Krajicek	6	Dubai, United Arab Emirates	Hard	QF	6–2, 6–2	67
4.	(Spain) Carlos Moyá	6	Ostrava, Czech Republic	Carpet (i)	2R	6–4, 6–4	63
5.	(Spain) Sergi Bruguera	10	Moscow, Russia	Carpet (i)	1R	2–6, 6–1, 6–4	53
1999
6.	(United States) Todd Martin	4	Vienna, Austria	Carpet (i)	1R	7–6^{(7–3)}, 6–7^{(5–7)}, 6–4	34
2000
7.	(United Kingdom) Tim Henman	10	Davis Cup, Ostrava, Czech Republic	Clay (i)	RR	6–4, 6–2, 6–2	44
8.	(United States) Pete Sampras	2	Davis Cup, Los Angeles, United States	Hard (i)	RR	7–6^{(7–1)}, 6–3, 6–2	39
9.	(Sweden) Thomas Enqvist	7	Toronto, Canada	Hard	3R	6–2, 1–6, 3–1, ret.	55
2001
10.	(Spain) Àlex Corretja	9	Gstaad, Switzerland	Clay	SF	3–6, 6–3, 6–4	40
11.	(Spain) Juan Carlos Ferrero	5	Gstaad, Switzerland	Clay	F	6–1, 6–7^{(5–7)}, 7–5	40
2002
12.	(Russia) Yevgeny Kafelnikov	4	Dubai, United Arab Emirates	Hard	QF	6–1, 6–1	17
13.	(France) Sébastien Grosjean	8	Davis Cup, Pau, France	Carpet (i)	RR	3–6, 6–1, 6–3, 6–1	15
14.	(United States) Andre Agassi	2	Tennis Masters Cup, Shanghai, China	Hard (i)	RR	7–5, 6–1	7
2003
15.	(Spain) Carlos Moyá	4	World Team Cup, Düsseldorf, Germany	Clay	RR	4–6, 7–6^{(7–5)}, 6–2	14
16.	(Switzerland) Roger Federer	3	Gstaad, Switzerland	Clay	F	5–7, 6–3, 6–3, 1–6, 6–3	10
17.	(Spain) Juan Carlos Ferrero	1	Paris, France	Carpet (i)	3R	7–5, 7–5	18
2004
18.	(United Kingdom) Tim Henman	5	Summer Olympics, Athens, Greece	Hard	1R	6–3, 6–3	24
19.	(Australia) Lleyton Hewitt	3	Tokyo, Japan	Hard	SF	6–4, 4–6, 6–2	28
20.	(United Kingdom) Tim Henman	4	Basel, Switzerland	Carpet (i)	QF	7–6^{(7–5)}, 7–5	20
21.	(Argentina) David Nalbandian	10	Basel, Switzerland	Carpet (i)	F	5–7, 6–3, 6–4, 1–6, 6–2	20

== Tennis records ==
- One of eleven players to beat Roger Federer at Wimbledon (1999); the other ten being Yevgeny Kafelnikov (2000), Tim Henman (2001), Mario Ančić (2002), Rafael Nadal (2008), Tomáš Berdych (2010), Jo-Wilfried Tsonga (2011), Sergiy Stakhovsky (2013), Novak Djokovic (2014, 2015, 2019), Milos Raonic (2016), Kevin Anderson (2018) and Hubert Hurkacz (2021).
