= Roger Federer's early career =

Statistics for Swiss tennis player

- Calendar prize money: $3,737,328

Singles
- Season record: 158–93 (62.95%)
- Calendar titles: 4
- Year-end ranking: No. 6 (2002)
- Ranking change from previous year: N/A

Grand Slam & significant results
- Australian Open: 4R (2002)
- French Open: QF (2001)
- Wimbledon: QF (2001)
- US Open: 4R (2001–02)
- Other tournaments
- Tour Finals: SF (2002)
- Olympic Games: 4th (2000)

Davis Cup
- Davis Cup: QF (1999, 2001)

Roger Federer's first ATP Tour-level tournament was the 1998 Gstaad Open, where he faced Lucas Arnold Ker in the round of 32 and lost, 4–6, 4–6. Federer's first final came at the 2000 Marseille Open, where he lost to fellow Swiss Marc Rosset, 6–2, 3–6, 6–7. Federer's first tournament win was at the 2001 Milan Indoor, where he defeated Julien Boutter, 6–4, 6–7, 6–4. The most prestigious finals he contested at this time included the 2002 Miami Masters, where he lost to Andre Agassi, 3–6, 3–6, 6–3, 4–6. Shortly thereafter, Federer won his first Masters Series event at the Hamburg Masters on clay, 6–1, 6–3, 6–4, over Marat Safin.

Federer made ten singles finals between 1998 and 2002, of which he won four and lost six. Federer made six doubles finals during this time, but lost the most prestigious of them at the 2002 Indian Wells Masters. The most prestigious events he won were the Hamburg Masters in 2002 and two Rotterdam 500 series events in 2001 and 2002.

== Yearly summary 1998–2002 ==
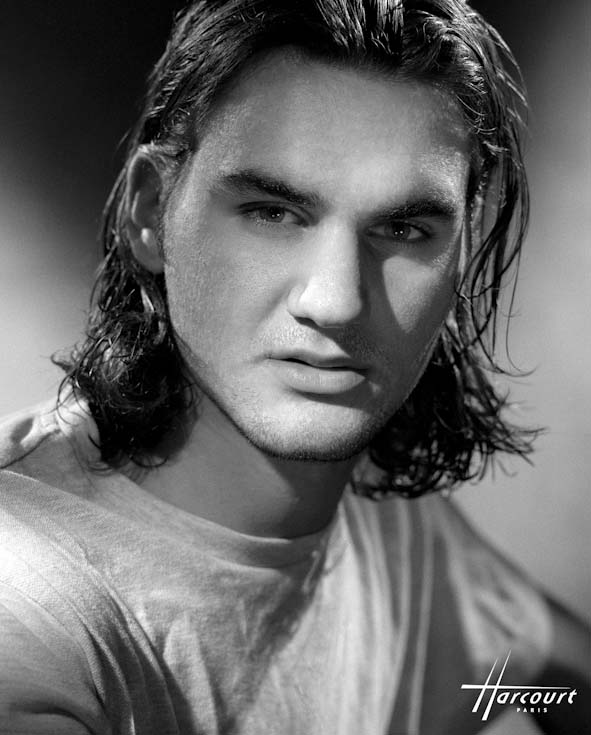
Federer in 1998, the first year he joined the ATP Tour.

=== 1998: Joining the Tour ===
In July 1998, the 16-year-old Federer played his first ATP Tour event, the Swiss Open Gstaad, in his home country of Switzerland, losing to No. 88 Lucas Arnold Ker in the first round. Although he played two more ATP tournaments in 1998, the majority of his matches were still at the Junior level. Later that year, he won his first ATP match against Guillaume Raoux in Toulouse. He then received a wildcard into the 1998 Swiss Indoors in his hometown in Basel, where he used to be a ball boy. Having reached the quarterfinal in Toulouse a week earlier, Federer came to Basel as the world No. 396, but lost in the first round to former world No. 1 Andre Agassi. He finished 1998 ranked as the world No. 301.

=== 1999: Grand Slam & Davis Cup debuts, Challenger titles, top 100 ===
In February 1999, Federer reached the quarterfinal of ATP tournaments in Marseille and Rotterdam, defeating the reigning champion of the 1998 French Open, Carlos Moyá, in the former, to enter the Top 150 before the Miami Masters. His rise through the rankings was noticed by the Swiss Davis Cup captain Claudio Mezzadri, who invited him to join the squad for the World Group first round clash against Italy on home soil in Neuchâtel. In April 1999, Federer made his Davis Cup debut against Italy, winning the rubber against No. 48 Davide Sanguinetti. In August, Federer won his first-ever professional title on the Challenger tour in Segovia, pairing with Sander Groen to beat Ota Fukárek and Alejandro Hernández in the final, which was played on Federer's 18th birthday.

He then competed in his first Grand Slam tournament at the French Open, but lost to Patrick Rafter in the first round after a four-set match. He also made his first appearance at Wimbledon, where he entered as a wildcard, but lost in the first round to No. 59 Jiří Novák in five sets. In the same tournament, Federer partnered Lleyton Hewitt in doubles, where they reached the round of 16, losing to Rafter and Jonas Björkman in another five-set match. Despite losing in the first rounds of both the French Open and Wimbledon and having just turned 18, he entered the world's Top 100 for the first time on 20 September 1999. At around that time, Federer was also a part of the Swiss military service, which was mandatory for all able-bodied male citizens when they reached the age of majority, and Federer was drafted in too. However, the then-18-year-old was discharged soon due to a chronic back problem.

In October 1999, Federer reached his first ATP semifinal in the Vienna Open, which he lost to Greg Rusedski. Later that month, Federer won his first and only singles ATP Challenger title in Brest, defeating Max Mirnyi in the final. In his first full year as a professional, Federer finished the year as the world No. 64, and in doing so at 18 years and four months of age, he became the youngest player to end the year among the world's top 100.

=== 2000: First finals, Olympic 4th place, top 30 ===
On 18 January 2000, the 18-year-old Federer played his first match in the main draw of the Australian Open, defeating former World No. 2 Michael Chang in the opening round to claim his first singles victory at a major event. However, he then lost to no. 49 Arnaud Clément in the third round. He equaled this achievement in his first US Open, losing in the third round to no. 12 Juan Carlos Ferrero. His first singles final came at the Marseille Open in February 2000, where he lost to fellow Swiss Marc Rosset. Federer then entered the Top 50 in March and ended 2000 ranked as the world No. 29. After reaching the semifinals at the 2000 Sydney Olympics, Federer was the runner-up in his home tournament at Basel. Even though he failed to make an impression at Grand Slams, it was the first year he played in all four. Federer then ended the year ranked world no. 29.

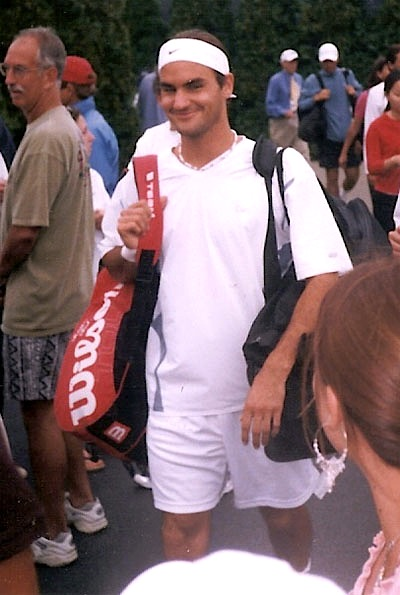
Federer at the 2002 US Open

=== 2001: Hopman Cup champion, first title, match with Sampras ===
Federer began the 2001 season by winning the 2001 Hopman Cup representing Switzerland, along with world No. 1 Martina Hingis. The duo defeated the American pair of Monica Seles and Jan-Michael Gambill in the finals. Federer later said that his experience with Hingis "definitely helped me to become the player I am today." In February 2001, Federer won his first ATP tournament after defeating Julien Boutter in the final of the Milan Indoor. During the same month, he won three matches for his country in its 3–2 Davis Cup victory over the United States in front of a home crowd in Basel, thus becoming only the fifth man in history to win every match against the United States, the most successful country in Davis Cup history with 31 titles. The last time a player defeated the United States in every match was in 1976. After a match against Marat Safin at the Rome Masters, in which both players threw their racquets several times, Federer decided to change his temper after watching himself in the highlight reel.

Federer reached his first Grand Slam quarterfinal at the French Open, losing to former world No. 2 and eventual finalist Àlex Corretja. His international breakthrough came at the Wimbledon Championships, when the 19-year-old Federer and the four-time defending champion and all-time Grand Slam leader Pete Sampras walked onto Centre Court for their only meeting in the fourth round. Federer, who was then ranked no. 15, defeated the No. 1 seed in a five-set match to snap Sampras' 31-match win streak at Wimbledon. The defeat was Sampras' first at the All England Club since 1996 and it ended his bid for a record-tying fifth consecutive title. In the quarters he faced Englishman Tim Henman, eventually losing in a fourth-set tiebreaker. Federer then had his best performance at the US Open by reaching the fourth round before falling to Andre Agassi. He finished 2001 with an ATP ranking of No. 13.

=== 2002: Breakthrough and top 10, but Grand Slam struggles ===
Federer reached his first Masters Series final in 2002 at the 2002 Miami Masters event, where he lost to Andre Agassi. He won his next Masters final in Hamburg, defeating former world No. 1 Marat Safin. This was a major breakthrough for Federer as it was his first Masters championship and his most significant title at the time. He also won both his Davis Cup singles matches against former world No. 1 Russians Safin and Yevgeny Kafelnikov.

After early-round exits at the French Open and Wimbledon, Federer suffered the devastating loss of his long-time Australian coach and mentor, Peter Carter, in a car crash in August. Federer learned of Carter's death while competing at the Canadian Masters in Toronto and although he had already lost in the first round, Federer was still playing in the doubles tournament partnering with Wayne Ferreira, ironically, a South African. In the third round, which he and Ferreira lost to Joshua Eagle and Sandon Stolle, Federer played the match wearing a black armband in honor of Carter.

Although he suffered first-round losses in the three tournaments he entered after Carter's death, Federer gathered himself together and began playing with more determination than ever. After reaching the fourth round of the US Open, he showed greater consistency by winning the Vienna Open, beating Jiří Novák in the final to win his fourth title of the season, and then reaching the quarterfinals at Madrid and Paris to jump in the rankings from No. 13 at the end of September to No. 7 by early November. This qualified him for the first time for the year-end Tennis Masters Cup, where he won all of his matches in the round-robin stage with the loss of only one set before losing the semifinals to the then-world no. 1 and eventual champion Lleyton Hewitt. At age 21, he ended 2002 ranked as the world No. 6.

=== Grand Slam performances ===
Year	Tournament	Round	Result	Opponent	Score
1999	French Open	1R	Loss	(Australia) Patrick Rafter	6–7, 6–3, 6–0, 6–2
1999	Wimbledon	1R	Loss	(Czech Republic) Jiří Novák	6–3, 3–6, 4–6, 6–3, 6–4
2000	Australian Open	1R	Win	(United States) Michael Chang	6–4, 6–4, 7–6^{(7–5)}
2000	Australian Open	2R	Win	(Slovakia) Ján Krošlák	7–6^{(7–1)}, 6–2, 6–3
2000	Australian Open	3R	Loss	(France) Arnaud Clément	6–1, 6–4, 6–3
2000	French Open	1R	Win	(Australia) Wayne Arthurs	7–6^{(7–4)}, 6–3, 1–6, 6–3
2000	French Open	2R	Win	(United States) Jan-Michael Gambill	7–6^{(7–5)}, 6–3, 6–3
2000	French Open	3R	Win	(Switzerland) Michel Kratochvil	7–6^{(7–5)}, 6–4, 2–6, 6–7^{(4–7)}, 8–6
2000	French Open	4R	Loss	(Spain) Àlex Corretja	7–5, 7–6^{(9–7)}, 6–2
2000	Wimbledon	1R	Loss	(Russia) Yevgeny Kafelnikov	7–5, 7–5, 7–6^{(8–6)}
2000	US Open	1R	Win	(Netherlands) Peter Wessels	4–6, 4–6, 6–3, 7–5, 3–4 (ret.)
2000	US Open	2R	Win	(Canada) Daniel Nestor	6–1, 7–6^{(7–5)}, 6–1
2000	US Open	3R	Loss	(Spain) Juan Carlos Ferrero	7–5, 7–6^{(8–6)}, 1–6, 7–6^{(8–6)}

Year	Tournament	Round	Result	Opponent	Score
2001	Australian Open	1R	Win	(France) Arnaud Di Pasquale	6–4, 4–6, 6–1, 6–4
2001	Australian Open	2R	Win	(France) Nicolas Escudé	6–1, 6–4, 6–4
2001	Australian Open	3R	Loss	(France) Arnaud Clément	7–6^{(7–5)}, 6–4, 6–4
2001	French Open	1R	Win	(Italy) Stefano Galvani	6–3, 6–3, 6–3
2001	French Open	2R	Win	(Armenia) Sargis Sargsian	4–6, 3–6, 6–2, 6–4, 9–7
2001	French Open	3R	Win	(Spain) David Sánchez	6–4, 6–3, 1–6, 6–3
2001	French Open	4R	Win	(Australia) Wayne Arthurs	3–6, 6–3, 6–4, 6–2
2001	French Open	QF	Loss	(Spain) Àlex Corretja	7–5, 6–4, 7–5
2001	Wimbledon	1R	Win	(Belgium) Olivier Rochus	6–2, 6–3, 6–2
2001	Wimbledon	2R	Win	(Belgium) Xavier Malisse	6–3, 7–5, 3–6, 4–6, 6–3
2001	Wimbledon	3R	Win	(Sweden) Jonas Björkman	7–6^{(7–4)}, 6–3, 7–6^{(7–2)}
2001	Wimbledon	4R	Win	(United States) Pete Sampras	7–6^{(9–7)}, 5–7, 6–4, 6–7^{(2–7)}, 7–5
2001	Wimbledon	QF	Loss	(United Kingdom) Tim Henman	7–5, 7–6^{(8–6)}, 2–6, 7–6^{(8–6)}
2001	US Open	1R	Win	(Germany) Lars Burgsmüller	6–4, 6–4, 6–4
2001	US Open	2R	Win	(United States) Robby Ginepri	6–2, 7–5, 6–1
2001	US Open	3R	Win	(Netherlands) Sjeng Schalken	6–4, 7–5, 7–6^{(7–3)}
2001	US Open	4R	Loss	(United States) Andre Agassi	6–1, 6–2, 6–4
2002	Australian Open	1R	Win	(United States) Michael Chang	6–4, 6–4, 6–3
2002	Australian Open	2R	Win	(Hungary) Attila Sávolt	6–2, 7–5, 6–4
2002	Australian Open	3R	Win	(Germany) Rainer Schüttler	7–6^{(8–6)}, 7–6^{(7–5)}, 6–4
2002	Australian Open	4R	Loss	(Germany) Tommy Haas	7–6^{(7–3)}, 4–6, 3–6, 6–4, 8–6
2002	French Open	1R	Loss	(Morocco) Hicham Arazi	6–3, 6–2, 6–4
2002	Wimbledon	1R	Loss	(Croatia) Mario Ančić	6–3, 7–6^{(7–2)}, 6–3
2002	US Open	1R	Win	(Czech Republic) Jiří Vaněk	6–1, 6–3, 4–6, 7–5
2002	US Open	2R	Win	(United States) Michael Chang	6–3, 6–1, 6–3
2002	US Open	3R	Win	(Belgium) Xavier Malisse	4–6, 6–3, 6–4, 6–4
2002	US Open	4R	Loss	(Belarus) Max Mirnyi	6–3, 7–6^{(7–5)}, 6–4

=== All Matches in Singles ===
==== 1998 ====
Tournament	Match	Round	Opponent (seed or key)	Rank	Result	Score
Rado Open; Gstaad, Switzerland; ATP 250; Clay, outdoor 6 – 12 July 1998
Rado Open; Gstaad, Switzerland; ATP 250; Clay, outdoor 6 – 12 July 1998	1	1R	(Argentina) Lucas Arnold Ker (LL)	88	Loss	4–6, 4–6
Geneva Open Challenger; Geneva, Switzerland; ATP Challenger Tour; Clay, outdoor 24 – 30 August 1998
Geneva Open Challenger; Geneva, Switzerland; ATP Challenger Tour; Clay, outdoor 24 – 30 August 1998	–	1R	(Bulgaria) Orlin Stanoytchev (5)	124	Loss	4–6, 6–7
Grand Prix de Tennis de Toulouse; Toulouse, France; ATP 250; Hard, indoor 28 September – 4 October 1998
Grand Prix de Tennis de Toulouse; Toulouse, France; ATP 250; Hard, indoor 28 September – 4 October 1998	–	Q1	(Argentina) Marcello Wowk	672	Win	7–6, 6–2
Grand Prix de Tennis de Toulouse; Toulouse, France; ATP 250; Hard, indoor 28 September – 4 October 1998	–	Q2	(Germany) Alex Rădulescu (3)	160	Win	7–6, 7–6
Grand Prix de Tennis de Toulouse; Toulouse, France; ATP 250; Hard, indoor 28 September – 4 October 1998	–	Q3	(France) Olivier Delaître (6)	215	Win	6–4, 6–4
Grand Prix de Tennis de Toulouse; Toulouse, France; ATP 250; Hard, indoor 28 September – 4 October 1998	2	1R	(France) Guillaume Raoux	45	Win	6–2, 6–2
Grand Prix de Tennis de Toulouse; Toulouse, France; ATP 250; Hard, indoor 28 September – 4 October 1998	3	2R	(Australia) Richard Fromberg (7)	43	Win	6–1, 7–6^{(7–5)}
Grand Prix de Tennis de Toulouse; Toulouse, France; ATP 250; Hard, indoor 28 September – 4 October 1998	4	QF	(Netherlands) Jan Siemerink (2)	20	Loss	6–7^{(5–7)}, 2–6
Davidoff Swiss Indoors; Basel, Switzerland; ATP 250; Hard, indoor 5 – 11 October 1998
Davidoff Swiss Indoors; Basel, Switzerland; ATP 250; Hard, indoor 5 – 11 October 1998	5	1R	(United States) Andre Agassi (4)	8	Loss	3–6, 2–6

==== 1999 ====
Tournament	Match	Round	Opponent (seed or key)	Rank	Result	Score
Australian Open; Melbourne, Australia; Grand Slam tournament Hard, outdoor 18 – 31 January 1999
Australian Open; Melbourne, Australia; Grand Slam tournament Hard, outdoor 18 – 31 January 1999	–	Q1	(France) Olivier Delaître	193	Loss	4–6, 4–6
Intersport Heilbronn Open; Talheim, Germany; ATP Challenger Tour; Carpet, indoor 25 – 31 January 1999
Intersport Heilbronn Open; Talheim, Germany; ATP Challenger Tour; Carpet, indoor 25 – 31 January 1999	–	Q1	(Netherlands) Raemon Sluiter	250	Win	6–2, 6–4
Intersport Heilbronn Open; Talheim, Germany; ATP Challenger Tour; Carpet, indoor 25 – 31 January 1999	–	Q2	(Czech Republic) Radek Štěpánek (4)	168	Win	6–4, 6–1
Intersport Heilbronn Open; Talheim, Germany; ATP Challenger Tour; Carpet, indoor 25 – 31 January 1999	–	Q3	(Italy) Stefano Pescosolido (6)	182	Win	6–1, 6–1
Intersport Heilbronn Open; Talheim, Germany; ATP Challenger Tour; Carpet, indoor 25 – 31 January 1999	–	1R	(Italy) Cristiano Caratti (Q)	161	Win	7–5, 6–4
Intersport Heilbronn Open; Talheim, Germany; ATP Challenger Tour; Carpet, indoor 25 – 31 January 1999	–	2R	(Netherlands) John van Lottum (6)	100	Win	6–2, 6–4
Intersport Heilbronn Open; Talheim, Germany; ATP Challenger Tour; Carpet, indoor 25 – 31 January 1999	–	QF	(United States) Justin Gimelstob (3)	80	Win	6–7, 7–6, 7–5
Intersport Heilbronn Open; Talheim, Germany; ATP Challenger Tour; Carpet, indoor 25 – 31 January 1999	–	SF	(Italy) Laurence Tieleman (7)	106	Loss	5–7, 1–6
Open 13; Marseille, France; ATP 250; Hard, indoor 1 – 8 February 1999
Open 13; Marseille, France; ATP 250; Hard, indoor 1 – 8 February 1999	6	1R	(Spain) Carlos Moyá (1)	5	Win	7–6^{(7–1)}, 3–6, 6–3
Open 13; Marseille, France; ATP 250; Hard, indoor 1 – 8 February 1999	7	2R	(France) Jérôme Golmard	63	Win	6–7^{(6–8)}, 7–6^{(7–5)}, 7–6^{(7–5)}
Open 13; Marseille, France; ATP 250; Hard, indoor 1 – 8 February 1999	8	QF	(France) Arnaud Clément (WC)	103	Loss	3–6, 3–6
ABN AMRO World Tennis Tournament; Rotterdam, Netherlands; ATP 500; Carpet, indoor 15 – 21 February 1999
ABN AMRO World Tennis Tournament; Rotterdam, Netherlands; ATP 500; Carpet, indoor 15 – 21 February 1999	–	Q1	(Germany) Hendrik Dreekmann (6)	89	Walkover	N/A
ABN AMRO World Tennis Tournament; Rotterdam, Netherlands; ATP 500; Carpet, indoor 15 – 21 February 1999	–	Q2	(Czech Republic) Martin Damm (3)	72	Win	6–2, 7–6
ABN AMRO World Tennis Tournament; Rotterdam, Netherlands; ATP 500; Carpet, indoor 15 – 21 February 1999	9	1R	(France) Guillaume Raoux	71	Win	6–7^{(4–7)}, 7–5, 7–6^{(7–3)}
ABN AMRO World Tennis Tournament; Rotterdam, Netherlands; ATP 500; Carpet, indoor 15 – 21 February 1999	10	2R	(Czech Republic) Bohdan Ulihrach	30	Win	6–4, 7–5
ABN AMRO World Tennis Tournament; Rotterdam, Netherlands; ATP 500; Carpet, indoor 15 – 21 February 1999	11	QF	(Russia) Yevgeny Kafelnikov (2)	2	Loss	1–6, 7–5, 4–6
Grenoble Challenger; Grenoble, France; ATP Challenger Tour; Hard, indoor 1 – 7 March 1999
Grenoble Challenger; Grenoble, France; ATP Challenger Tour; Hard, indoor 1 – 7 March 1999	–	1R	(France) Rodolphe Gilbert	191	Win	6–2, 6–0
Grenoble Challenger; Grenoble, France; ATP Challenger Tour; Hard, indoor 1 – 7 March 1999	–	2R	(France) Julien Boutter (Q)	215	Loss	6–4, 2–6, 3–6
Lipton Championships; Miami, United States; ATP 1000; Hard, outdoor 15 – 29 March 1999
Lipton Championships; Miami, United States; ATP 1000; Hard, outdoor 15 – 29 March 1999	12	1R	(Denmark) Kenneth Carlsen	106	Loss	5–7, 6–7^{(4–7)}
Davis Cup, World Group; Neuchâtel, Switzerland; Davis Cup; Carpet, indoor 2 – 4 April 1999
Davis Cup, World Group; Neuchâtel, Switzerland; Davis Cup; Carpet, indoor 2 – 4 April 1999	13	1R; R2	(Italy) Davide Sanguinetti	48	Win	6–4, 6–7^{(3–7)}, 6–3, 6–4
Davis Cup, World Group; Neuchâtel, Switzerland; Davis Cup; Carpet, indoor 2 – 4 April 1999	14	1R; R5	(Italy) Gianluca Pozzi	69	Loss	4–6, 6–7^{(4–7)}
Monte Carlo Open; Monte Carlo, Monaco; ATP 1000; Clay, outdoor 19 – 25 April 1999
Monte Carlo Open; Monte Carlo, Monaco; ATP 1000; Clay, outdoor 19 – 25 April 1999	15	1R	(United States) Vincent Spadea	33	Loss	6–7^{(3–7)}, 0–6
Espinho Challenger; Espinho, Portugal; ATP Challenger Tour; Clay, outdoor 26 April – 2 May 1999
Espinho Challenger; Espinho, Portugal; ATP Challenger Tour; Clay, outdoor 26 April – 2 May 1999	–	1R	(Spain) Joan Balcells (Q)	291	Loss	6–7, 3–6
Renault Slovenian Open; Domžale, Slovenia; ATP Challenger Tour; Clay, outdoor 3 – 9 May 1999
Renault Slovenian Open; Domžale, Slovenia; ATP Challenger Tour; Clay, outdoor 3 – 9 May 1999	–	Q1	(Slovenia) Igor Ogrinc	–	Win	6–3, 7–5
Renault Slovenian Open; Domžale, Slovenia; ATP Challenger Tour; Clay, outdoor 3 – 9 May 1999	–	Q2	(Slovenia) Blaž Trupej	605	Win	6–3, 6–7, 6–3
Renault Slovenian Open; Domžale, Slovenia; ATP Challenger Tour; Clay, outdoor 3 – 9 May 1999	–	Q3	(Spain) David Sánchez (8)	253	Win	6–2, 7–5
Renault Slovenian Open; Domžale, Slovenia; ATP Challenger Tour; Clay, outdoor 3 – 9 May 1999	–	1R	(Argentina) Eduardo Medica (5)	117	Win	6–3, 6–2
Renault Slovenian Open; Domžale, Slovenia; ATP Challenger Tour; Clay, outdoor 3 – 9 May 1999	–	2R	(Czech Republic) Radomír Vašek (Q)	237	Win	7–6, 6–1
Renault Slovenian Open; Domžale, Slovenia; ATP Challenger Tour; Clay, outdoor 3 – 9 May 1999	–	QF	(Spain) Juan Albert Viloca	149	Win	2–6, 6–3, 6–4
Renault Slovenian Open; Domžale, Slovenia; ATP Challenger Tour; Clay, outdoor 3 – 9 May 1999	–	SF	(Romania) Dinu Pescariu (1)	99	Loss	6–7, 2–6
French Open; Paris, France; Grand Slam tournament Clay, outdoor 24 May – 6 June 1999
French Open; Paris, France; Grand Slam tournament Clay, outdoor 24 May – 6 June 1999	16	1R	(Australia) Patrick Rafter (3)	3	Loss	7–5, 3–6, 0–6, 2–6
Surbiton Trophy; Surbiton, United Kingdom; ATP Challenger Tour; Grass, outdoor 31 May – 6 June 1999
Surbiton Trophy; Surbiton, United Kingdom; ATP Challenger Tour; Grass, outdoor 31 May – 6 June 1999	–	1R	(Venezuela) Maurice Ruah	175	Win	7–6, 6–2
Surbiton Trophy; Surbiton, United Kingdom; ATP Challenger Tour; Grass, outdoor 31 May – 6 June 1999	–	2R	(Netherlands) John van Lottum (2)	64	Win	6–3, 3–6, 6–1
Surbiton Trophy; Surbiton, United Kingdom; ATP Challenger Tour; Grass, outdoor 31 May – 6 June 1999	–	QF	(United States) Alex O'Brien	173	Win	6–1, 6–4
Surbiton Trophy; Surbiton, United Kingdom; ATP Challenger Tour; Grass, outdoor 31 May – 6 June 1999	–	SF	(Armenia) Sargis Sargsian (5)	75	Loss	7–6, 3–6, 6–7
Stella Artois Championships; London, United Kingdom; ATP 250; Grass, outdoor 7 – 13 June 1999
Stella Artois Championships; London, United Kingdom; ATP 250; Grass, outdoor 7 – 13 June 1999	17	1R	(Zimbabwe) Byron Black (13)	37	Loss	3–6, 0–6
Nottingham Open; Nottingham, United Kingdom; ATP 250; Grass, outdoor 14 – 20 June 1999
Nottingham Open; Nottingham, United Kingdom; ATP 250; Grass, outdoor 14 – 20 June 1999	–	Q1	(United Kingdom) Ben Haran	–	Win	6–1, 6–1
Nottingham Open; Nottingham, United Kingdom; ATP 250; Grass, outdoor 14 – 20 June 1999	–	Q2	(United States) Donald Johnson	581	Loss	3–6, 2–6
The Championships, Wimbledon; London, United Kingdom; Grand Slam tournament Grass, outdoor 21 June – 4 July 1999
The Championships, Wimbledon; London, United Kingdom; Grand Slam tournament Grass, outdoor 21 June – 4 July 1999	18	1R	(Czech Republic) Jiří Novák	59	Loss	3–6, 6–3, 6–4, 3–6, 4–6
Rado Swiss Open Gstaad; Gstaad, Switzerland; ATP 250; Clay, outdoor 5 – 11 July 1999
Rado Swiss Open Gstaad; Gstaad, Switzerland; ATP 250; Clay, outdoor 5 – 11 July 1999	19	1R	(Morocco) Younes El Aynaoui	33	Loss	2–6, 3–6
Davis Cup, World Group; Brussels, Belgium; Davis Cup; Clay, outdoor 16 – 18 July 1999
Davis Cup, World Group; Brussels, Belgium; Davis Cup; Clay, outdoor 16 – 18 July 1999	20	QF; R2	(Belgium) Christophe Van Garsse	146	Loss	6–7^{(4–7)}, 6–3, 6–1, 5–7, 1–6
Davis Cup, World Group; Brussels, Belgium; Davis Cup; Clay, outdoor 16 – 18 July 1999	21	QF; R4	(Belgium) Xavier Malisse	111	Loss	6–4, 3–6, 5–7, 6–7^{(5–7)}
Open Castilla y León; Segovia, Spain; ATP Challenger Tour; Clay, outdoor 2 – 8 August 1999
Open Castilla y León; Segovia, Spain; ATP Challenger Tour; Clay, outdoor 2 – 8 August 1999	–	1R	(Spain) Quino Muñoz (WC)	520	Win	7–6^{(7–5)}, 6–4
Open Castilla y León; Segovia, Spain; ATP Challenger Tour; Clay, outdoor 2 – 8 August 1999	–	2R	(France) Nicolas Escudé	139	Loss	6–3, 1–6, 4–6
Legg Mason Tennis Classic; Washington, D.C., United States; ATP 500; Hard, outdoor 16 – 22 August 1999
Legg Mason Tennis Classic; Washington, D.C., United States; ATP 500; Hard, outdoor 16 – 22 August 1999	22	1R	(Germany) Bjorn Phau (Q)	407	Loss	2–6, 3–6
Waldbaum's Hamlet Cup; Long Island, United States; ATP 250; Hard, outdoor 23 – 29 August 1999
Waldbaum's Hamlet Cup; Long Island, United States; ATP 250; Hard, outdoor 23 – 29 August 1999	–	Q1	(United States) Todd Meringoff (WC)	796	Win	6–2, 3–6, 6–3
Waldbaum's Hamlet Cup; Long Island, United States; ATP 250; Hard, outdoor 23 – 29 August 1999	–	Q2	(Philippines) Eric Taino (WC)	504	Loss	2–6, 2–6
US Open; New York City, United States; Grand Slam tournament Hard, outdoor 30 August – 12 September 1999
US Open; New York City, United States; Grand Slam tournament Hard, outdoor 30 August – 12 September 1999	–	Q1	(Netherlands) Edwin Kempes	228	Win	6–4, 6–4
US Open; New York City, United States; Grand Slam tournament Hard, outdoor 30 August – 12 September 1999	–	Q2	(Switzerland) Ivo Heuberger	231	Loss	6–7, 2–6
President's Cup; Tashkent, Uzbekistan; ATP 250; Hard, outdoor 13 – 19 September 1999
President's Cup; Tashkent, Uzbekistan; ATP 250; Hard, outdoor 13 – 19 September 1999	23	1R	(France) Cédric Pioline (5)	16	Win	6–4, 6–3
President's Cup; Tashkent, Uzbekistan; ATP 250; Hard, outdoor 13 – 19 September 1999	24	2R	(Netherlands) Peter Wessels	92	Loss	6–4, 6–7^{(1–7)}, 4–6
Adidas Open de Toulouse; Toulouse, France; ATP 250; Hard, indoor 27 September – 3 October 1999
Adidas Open de Toulouse; Toulouse, France; ATP 250; Hard, indoor 27 September – 3 October 1999	25	1R	(Germany) Rainer Schüttler	46	Win	7–6^{(7–4)}, 6–1
Adidas Open de Toulouse; Toulouse, France; ATP 250; Hard, indoor 27 September – 3 October 1999	26	2R	(France) Fabrice Santoro (7)	39	Loss	3–6, 6–7^{(3–7)}
Davidoff Swiss Indoors; Basel, Switzerland; ATP 250; Carpet, indoor 3 – 10 October 1999
Davidoff Swiss Indoors; Basel, Switzerland; ATP 250; Carpet, indoor 3 – 10 October 1999	27	1R	(Czech Republic) Martin Damm (LL)	105	Win	6–2, 3–6, 6–4
Davidoff Swiss Indoors; Basel, Switzerland; ATP 250; Carpet, indoor 3 – 10 October 1999	28	2R	(Germany) Alexander Popp (Q)	134	Win	6–2, 7–5
Davidoff Swiss Indoors; Basel, Switzerland; ATP 250; Carpet, indoor 3 – 10 October 1999	29	QF	(United Kingdom) Tim Henman (4)	6	Loss	3–6, 5–7
CA-TennisTrophy; Vienna, Austria; ATP 500; Carpet, indoor 11 – 18 October 1999
CA-TennisTrophy; Vienna, Austria; ATP 500; Carpet, indoor 11 – 18 October 1999	30	1R	(United States) Vince Spadea	21	Win	6–4, 6–2
CA-TennisTrophy; Vienna, Austria; ATP 500; Carpet, indoor 11 – 18 October 1999	31	2R	(Czech Republic) Jiří Novák	34	Win	7–6^{(10–8)}, 6–1
CA-TennisTrophy; Vienna, Austria; ATP 500; Carpet, indoor 11 – 18 October 1999	32	QF	(Slovakia) Karol Kučera	15	Win	2–6, 6–4, 6–1
CA-TennisTrophy; Vienna, Austria; ATP 500; Carpet, indoor 11 – 18 October 1999	33	SF	(United Kingdom) Greg Rusedski (5)	7	Loss	3–6, 4–6
Grand Prix de Tennis de Lyon; Lyon, France; ATP 250; Carpet, indoor 18 – 25 October 1999
Grand Prix de Tennis de Lyon; Lyon, France; ATP 250; Carpet, indoor 18 – 25 October 1999	34	1R	(Czech Republic) Daniel Vacek	53	Win	6–3, 6–4
Grand Prix de Tennis de Lyon; Lyon, France; ATP 250; Carpet, indoor 18 – 25 October 1999	35	2R	(Australia) Lleyton Hewitt (13)	27	Loss	6–7^{(4–7)}, 6–2, 4–6
Brest Challenger; Brest, France; ATP Challenger Tour; Hard, indoor 25 – 31 October 1999
Brest Challenger; Brest, France; ATP Challenger Tour; Hard, indoor 25 – 31 October 1999	–	1R	(France) Lionel Roux (WC)	191	Win	6–3, 4–6, 6–4
Brest Challenger; Brest, France; ATP Challenger Tour; Hard, indoor 25 – 31 October 1999	–	2R	(France) Rodolphe Gilbert	180	Win	6–4, 6–3
Brest Challenger; Brest, France; ATP Challenger Tour; Hard, indoor 25 – 31 October 1999	–	QF	(France) Michaël Llodra (WC)	333	Win	6–3, 6–3
Brest Challenger; Brest, France; ATP Challenger Tour; Hard, indoor 25 – 31 October 1999	–	SF	(Czech Republic) Martin Damm	134	Win	6–3, 7–6^{(7–4)}
Brest Challenger; Brest, France; ATP Challenger Tour; Hard, indoor 25 – 31 October 1999	–	W	(Belarus) Max Mirnyi (5)	90	Win	7–6^{(7–4)}, 6–3
Stockholm Open; Stockholm, Sweden; ATP 250; Hard, indoor 8 – 14 November 1999
Stockholm Open; Stockholm, Sweden; ATP 250; Hard, indoor 8 – 14 November 1999	–	Q1	(Italy) Cristiano Caratti	218	Win	6–3, 7–5
Stockholm Open; Stockholm, Sweden; ATP 250; Hard, indoor 8 – 14 November 1999	–	Q2	(Sweden) Marcus Sarstrand	447	Loss	2–6, 6–4, 6–7

==== 2000 ====
Tournament	Match	Round	Opponent (seed or key)	Rank	Result	Score
AAPT Championships; Adelaide, Australia; ATP 250; Hard, outdoor 3 – 9 January 2000
AAPT Championships; Adelaide, Australia; ATP 250; Hard, outdoor 3 – 9 January 2000	36	1R	(Germany) Jens Knippschild	91	Win	6–1, 6–4
AAPT Championships; Adelaide, Australia; ATP 250; Hard, outdoor 3 – 9 January 2000	37	2R	(Sweden) Thomas Enqvist (1)	4	Loss	6–7^{(5–7)}, 4–6
Heineken Open; Auckland, New Zealand; ATP 250; Hard, outdoor 10 – 15 January 2000
Heineken Open; Auckland, New Zealand; ATP 250; Hard, outdoor 10 – 15 January 2000	38	1R	(Spain) Juan Carlos Ferrero (7)	45	Loss	4–6, 4–6
Australian Open; Melbourne, Australia; Grand Slam tournament Hard, outdoor 17 – 30 January 2000
Australian Open; Melbourne, Australia; Grand Slam tournament Hard, outdoor 17 – 30 January 2000	39	1R	(United States) Michael Chang	38	Win	6–4, 6–4, 7–6^{(7–5)}
Australian Open; Melbourne, Australia; Grand Slam tournament Hard, outdoor 17 – 30 January 2000	40	2R	(Slovakia) Ján Krošlák	104	Win	7–6^{(7–1)}, 6–2, 6–3
Australian Open; Melbourne, Australia; Grand Slam tournament Hard, outdoor 17 – 30 January 2000	41	3R	(France) Arnaud Clément	54	Loss	1–6, 4–6, 3–6
Davis Cup, World Group; Zürich, Switzerland; Davis Cup; Carpet, indoor 4 – 6 February 2000
Davis Cup, World Group; Zürich, Switzerland; Davis Cup; Carpet, indoor 4 – 6 February 2000	42	1R; R2	(Australia) Mark Philippoussis	17	Win	6–4, 7–6^{(7–3)}, 4–6, 6–4
Davis Cup, World Group; Zürich, Switzerland; Davis Cup; Carpet, indoor 4 – 6 February 2000	43	1R; R4	(Australia) Lleyton Hewitt	15	Loss	2–6, 6–3, 6–7^{(2–7)}, 1–6
Open 13; Marseille, France; ATP 250; Hard, indoor 7 – 14 February 2000
Open 13; Marseille, France; ATP 250; Hard, indoor 7 – 14 February 2000	44	1R	(France) Antony Dupuis (Q)	93	Win	6–4, 6–4
Open 13; Marseille, France; ATP 250; Hard, indoor 7 – 14 February 2000	45	2R	(Sweden) Thomas Johansson (7)	41	Win	6–3, 6–2
Open 13; Marseille, France; ATP 250; Hard, indoor 7 – 14 February 2000	46	QF	(Croatia) Ivan Ljubičić	69	Win	6–2, 3–6, 7–6^{(7–5)}
Open 13; Marseille, France; ATP 250; Hard, indoor 7 – 14 February 2000	47	SF	(France) Fabrice Santoro (6)	38	Win	7–6^{(7–4)}, 7–5
Open 13; Marseille, France; ATP 250; Hard, indoor 7 – 14 February 2000	48	F	(Switzerland) Marc Rosset	77	Loss (1)	6–2, 3–6, 6–7^{(5–7)}
AXA Cup; London, United Kingdom; ATP 500; Hard, indoor 21 – 27 February 2000
AXA Cup; London, United Kingdom; ATP 500; Hard, indoor 21 – 27 February 2000	49	1R	(Germany) Nicolas Kiefer (2)	4	Win	6–2, 6–3
AXA Cup; London, United Kingdom; ATP 500; Hard, indoor 21 – 27 February 2000	50	2R	(Croatia) Goran Ivanišević (WC)	61	Win	7–5, 6–3
AXA Cup; London, United Kingdom; ATP 500; Hard, indoor 21 – 27 February 2000	51	QF	(Switzerland) Marc Rosset	72	Loss	6–3, 4–6, 4–6
Copenhagen Open; Copenhagen, Denmark; ATP 250; Hard, indoor 26 February – 5 March 2000
Copenhagen Open; Copenhagen, Denmark; ATP 250; Hard, indoor 26 February – 5 March 2000	52	1R	(Belgium) Filip Dewulf (Q)	234	Win	6–4, 4–6, 6–3
Copenhagen Open; Copenhagen, Denmark; ATP 250; Hard, indoor 26 February – 5 March 2000	53	2R	(Sweden) Fredrik Jonsson	121	Win	6–4, 6–4
Copenhagen Open; Copenhagen, Denmark; ATP 250; Hard, indoor 26 February – 5 March 2000	54	QF	(Italy) Gianluca Pozzi	83	Win	4–6, 6–1, 6–3
Copenhagen Open; Copenhagen, Denmark; ATP 250; Hard, indoor 26 February – 5 March 2000	55	SF	(Sweden) Magnus Larsson (3)	48	Loss	3–6, 6–7^{(6–8)}
Indian Wells Masters; Indian Wells, United States; ATP 1000; Hard, outdoor 10 – 18 March 2000
Indian Wells Masters; Indian Wells, United States; ATP 1000; Hard, outdoor 10 – 18 March 2000	–	Q1	(India) Leander Paes	117	Loss	7–5, 1–6, 4–6
Ericsson Open; Miami, United States; ATP 1000; Hard, outdoor 23 March – 2 April 2000
Ericsson Open; Miami, United States; ATP 1000; Hard, outdoor 23 March – 2 April 2000	56	1R	(United States) Justin Gimelstob (WC)	99	Win	7–5, 6–3
Ericsson Open; Miami, United States; ATP 1000; Hard, outdoor 23 March – 2 April 2000	57	2R	(Argentina) Mariano Zabaleta (23)	25	Loss	4–6, 6–7^{(7–9)}
Monte Carlo Masters; Monte Carlo, Monaco; ATP 1000; Clay, outdoor 17 – 23 April 2000
Monte Carlo Masters; Monte Carlo, Monaco; ATP 1000; Clay, outdoor 17 – 23 April 2000	58	1R	(Czech Republic) Jiří Novák	37	Loss	1–6, 6–2, 5–7
Torneo Godó; Barcelona, Spain; ATP 500; Clay, outdoor 24 – 30 April 2000
Torneo Godó; Barcelona, Spain; ATP 500; Clay, outdoor 24 – 30 April 2000	59	1R	(Spain) Sergi Bruguera (WC)	249	Loss	1–6, 1–6
Italian Open; Rome, Italy; ATP 1000; Clay, outdoor 8 – 14 May 2000
Italian Open; Rome, Italy; ATP 1000; Clay, outdoor 8 – 14 May 2000	60	1R	(Ukraine) Andrei Medvedev	25	Loss	6–3, 3–6, 5–7
Hamburg Masters; Hamburg, Germany; ATP 1000; Clay, outdoor 15 – 21 May 2000
Hamburg Masters; Hamburg, Germany; ATP 1000; Clay, outdoor 15 – 21 May 2000	61	1R	(Romania) Andrei Pavel (Q)	70	Loss	4–6, 3–6
International Raiffeisen Grand Prix; Sankt Pölten, Austria; ATP 250; Clay, outdoor 22 – 28 May 2000
International Raiffeisen Grand Prix; Sankt Pölten, Austria; ATP 250; Clay, outdoor 22 – 28 May 2000	62	1R	(Germany) Markus Hantschk	94	Loss	2–6, 1–6
French Open; Paris, France; Grand Slam tournament Clay, outdoor 22 – 28 May 2000
French Open; Paris, France; Grand Slam tournament Clay, outdoor 22 – 28 May 2000	63	1R	(Australia) Wayne Arthurs	106	Win	7–6^{(7–4)}, 6–3, 1–6, 6–3
French Open; Paris, France; Grand Slam tournament Clay, outdoor 22 – 28 May 2000	64	2R	(United States) Jan-Michael Gambill	69	Win	7–6^{(7–5)}, 6–3, 6–3
French Open; Paris, France; Grand Slam tournament Clay, outdoor 22 – 28 May 2000	65	3R	(Switzerland) Michel Kratochvil (Q)	120	Win	7–6^{(7–5)}, 6–4, 2–6, 6–7^{(4–7)}, 8–6
French Open; Paris, France; Grand Slam tournament Clay, outdoor 22 – 28 May 2000	66	4R	(Spain) Àlex Corretja (10)	10	Loss	5–7, 6–7^{(7–9)}, 2–6
Gerry Weber Open; Halle, Germany; ATP 250; Grass, outdoor 12 – 18 June 2000
Gerry Weber Open; Halle, Germany; ATP 250; Grass, outdoor 12 – 18 June 2000	67	1R	(France) Arnaud Clément	57	Win	6–4, 6–2
Gerry Weber Open; Halle, Germany; ATP 250; Grass, outdoor 12 – 18 June 2000	68	2R	(Sweden) Magnus Larsson	49	Win	6–2, 6–3
Gerry Weber Open; Halle, Germany; ATP 250; Grass, outdoor 12 – 18 June 2000	69	QF	(United States) Michael Chang	28	Loss	5–7, 2–6
Nottingham Open; Nottingham, United Kingdom; ATP 250; Grass, outdoor 19 – 25 June 2000
Nottingham Open; Nottingham, United Kingdom; ATP 250; Grass, outdoor 19 – 25 June 2000	70	1R	(Australia) Richard Fromberg	71	Loss	5–7, 1–6
The Championships, Wimbledon; London, United Kingdom; Grand Slam tournament Grass, outdoor 26 June – 9 July 2000
The Championships, Wimbledon; London, United Kingdom; Grand Slam tournament Grass, outdoor 26 June – 9 July 2000	71	1R	(Russia) Yevgeny Kafelnikov (5)	5	Loss	5–7, 5–7, 6–7^{(6–8)}
UBS Open Gstaad; Gstaad, Switzerland; ATP 250; Clay, outdoor 10 – 17 July 2000
UBS Open Gstaad; Gstaad, Switzerland; ATP 250; Clay, outdoor 10 – 17 July 2000	72	1R	(Spain) Àlex Corretja (1)	10	Loss	4–6, 6–4, 4–6
Davis Cup, World Group Play-offs; St. Gallen, Switzerland; Davis Cup; Carpet, indoor 21 – 23 July 2000
Davis Cup, World Group Play-offs; St. Gallen, Switzerland; Davis Cup; Carpet, indoor 21 – 23 July 2000	73	PO; R2	(Belarus) Vladimir Voltchkov	69	Win	4–6, 7–5, 7–6^{(7–1)}, 5–7, 6–2
du Maurier Open; Toronto, Canada; ATP 1000; Hard, outdoor 31 July – 6 August 2000
du Maurier Open; Toronto, Canada; ATP 1000; Hard, outdoor 31 July – 6 August 2000	74	1R	(Australia) Lleyton Hewitt (7)	10	Loss	6–3, 3–6, 2–6
Cincinnati Masters; Cincinnati, United States; ATP 1000; Hard, outdoor 7 – 14 August 2000
Cincinnati Masters; Cincinnati, United States; ATP 1000; Hard, outdoor 7 – 14 August 2000	75	1R	(Spain) Francisco Clavet	43	Loss	6–7^{(3–7)}, 6–7^{(4–7)}
RCA Championships; Indianapolis, United States; ATP 500; Hard, outdoor 14 – 20 August 2000
RCA Championships; Indianapolis, United States; ATP 500; Hard, outdoor 14 – 20 August 2000	76	1R	(Australia) James Sekulov	191	Loss	4–6, 5–7
US Open; New York City, United States; Grand Slam tournament Hard, outdoor 28 August – 10 September 2000
US Open; New York City, United States; Grand Slam tournament Hard, outdoor 28 August – 10 September 2000	77	1R	(Netherlands) Peter Wessels	89	Win	4–6, 4–6, 6–3, 7–5, 3–4, ret.
US Open; New York City, United States; Grand Slam tournament Hard, outdoor 28 August – 10 September 2000	78	2R	(Canada) Daniel Nestor (PR)	307	Win	6–1, 7–6^{(7–5)}, 6–1
US Open; New York City, United States; Grand Slam tournament Hard, outdoor 28 August – 10 September 2000	79	3R	(Spain) Juan Carlos Ferrero (12)	12	Loss	5–7, 6–7^{(6–8)}, 6–1, 6–7^{(6–8)}
Summer Olympics; Sydney, Australia; Olympics; Hard, outdoor 19 – 28 September 2000
Summer Olympics; Sydney, Australia; Olympics; Hard, outdoor 19 – 28 September 2000	80	1R	(Germany) David Prinosil	60	Win	6–2, 6–2
Summer Olympics; Sydney, Australia; Olympics; Hard, outdoor 19 – 28 September 2000	81	2R	(Slovakia) Karol Kučera	43	Win	6–4, 7–6^{(7–5)}
Summer Olympics; Sydney, Australia; Olympics; Hard, outdoor 19 – 28 September 2000	82	3R	(Sweden) Mikael Tillström (Alt)	61	Win	6–1, 6–2
Summer Olympics; Sydney, Australia; Olympics; Hard, outdoor 19 – 28 September 2000	83	QF	(Morocco) Karim Alami	34	Win	7–6^{(7–2)}, 6–1
Summer Olympics; Sydney, Australia; Olympics; Hard, outdoor 19 – 28 September 2000	84	SF	(Germany) Tommy Haas	48	Loss	3–6, 2–6
Summer Olympics; Sydney, Australia; Olympics; Hard, outdoor 19 – 28 September 2000	85	SF-B	(France) Arnaud Di Pasquale	62	Loss	6–7^{(5–7)}, 7–6^{(9–7)}, 3–6
CA-TennisTrophy; Vienna, Austria; ATP 500; Hard, indoor 9 – 15 October 2000
CA-TennisTrophy; Vienna, Austria; ATP 500; Hard, indoor 9 – 15 October 2000	86	1R	(Sweden) Magnus Norman (2)	4	Win	4–6, 7–6^{(7–4)}, 6–4
CA-TennisTrophy; Vienna, Austria; ATP 500; Hard, indoor 9 – 15 October 2000	87	2R	(Belarus) Max Mirnyi (Q)	43	Win	6–3, 6–3
CA-TennisTrophy; Vienna, Austria; ATP 500; Hard, indoor 9 – 15 October 2000	88	QF	(Netherlands) Richard Krajicek	20	Win	6–4, 6–3
CA-TennisTrophy; Vienna, Austria; ATP 500; Hard, indoor 9 – 15 October 2000	89	SF	(United Kingdom) Tim Henman (6)	10	Loss	6–2, 6–7^{(4–7)}, 3–6
Davidoff Swiss Indoors; Basel, Switzerland; ATP 250; Carpet, indoor 24 – 29 October 2000
Davidoff Swiss Indoors; Basel, Switzerland; ATP 250; Carpet, indoor 24 – 29 October 2000	90	1R	(Germany) Tommy Haas (WC)	20	Win	6–3, 6–3
Davidoff Swiss Indoors; Basel, Switzerland; ATP 250; Carpet, indoor 24 – 29 October 2000	91	2R	(Romania) Andrei Pavel	27	Win	7–6^{(7–4)}, 6–4
Davidoff Swiss Indoors; Basel, Switzerland; ATP 250; Carpet, indoor 24 – 29 October 2000	92	QF	(France) Nicolas Thomann (Q)	185	Win	6–4, 6–4
Davidoff Swiss Indoors; Basel, Switzerland; ATP 250; Carpet, indoor 24 – 29 October 2000	93	SF	(Australia) Lleyton Hewitt (3)	9	Win	6–4, 5–7, 7–6^{(8–6)}
Davidoff Swiss Indoors; Basel, Switzerland; ATP 250; Carpet, indoor 24 – 29 October 2000	94	F	(Sweden) Thomas Enqvist (2)	6	Loss (2)	2–6, 6–4, 6–7^{(4–7)}, 6–1, 1–6
Stuttgart Masters; Stuttgart, Germany; ATP 1000; Hard, indoor 30 October – 6 November 2000
Stuttgart Masters; Stuttgart, Germany; ATP 1000; Hard, indoor 30 October – 6 November 2000	95	1R	(United States) Jan-Michael Gambill	27	Win	7–6^{(7–3)}, 1–0, retired
Stuttgart Masters; Stuttgart, Germany; ATP 1000; Hard, indoor 30 October – 6 November 2000	96	2R	(Russia) Yevgeny Kafelnikov (6)	5	Loss	5–7, 3–6
Grand Prix de Tennis de Lyon; Lyon, France; ATP 250; Carpet, indoor 6 – 13 November 2000
Grand Prix de Tennis de Lyon; Lyon, France; ATP 250; Carpet, indoor 6 – 13 November 2000	97	1R	(France) Nicolas Escudé	38	Win	6–3, 7–6^{(7–3)}
Grand Prix de Tennis de Lyon; Lyon, France; ATP 250; Carpet, indoor 6 – 13 November 2000	98	2R	(Slovakia) Karol Kučera	74	Loss	6–3, 2–6, 1–6
Paris Masters; Paris, France; ATP 1000; Carpet, indoor 13 – 20 November 2000
Paris Masters; Paris, France; ATP 1000; Carpet, indoor 13 – 20 November 2000	99	1R	(Slovakia) Dominik Hrbatý	19	Loss	6–4, 2–6, 2–6
Scania Stockholm Open; Stockholm, Sweden; ATP 250; Hard, indoor 20 – 26 November 2000
Scania Stockholm Open; Stockholm, Sweden; ATP 250; Hard, indoor 20 – 26 November 2000	100	1R	(Russia) Mikhail Youzhny	110	Win	5–7, 6–4, 6–3
Scania Stockholm Open; Stockholm, Sweden; ATP 250; Hard, indoor 20 – 26 November 2000	101	2R	(Sweden) Andreas Vinciguerra	55	Loss	5–7, 6–7^{(3–7)}

==== 2001 ====
Tournament	Match	Round	Opponent (seed or key)	Rank	Result	Score
Adidas International; Sydney, Australia; ATP 250; Hard, outdoor 7 – 14 January 2001
Adidas International; Sydney, Australia; ATP 250; Hard, outdoor 7 – 14 January 2001	102	1R	(South Africa) Wayne Ferreira (3)	13	Win	6–3, 6–4
Adidas International; Sydney, Australia; ATP 250; Hard, outdoor 7 – 14 January 2001	103	2R	(Switzerland) Marc Rosset	29	Win	6–1, 6–2
Adidas International; Sydney, Australia; ATP 250; Hard, outdoor 7 – 14 January 2001	104	QF	(France) Sébastien Grosjean (6)	19	Loss	5–7, 4–6
Australian Open; Melbourne, Australia; Grand Slam tournament Hard, outdoor 15 – 28 January 2001
Australian Open; Melbourne, Australia; Grand Slam tournament Hard, outdoor 15 – 28 January 2001	105	1R	(France) Arnaud Di Pasquale	61	Win	6–4, 4–6, 6–1, 7–5
Australian Open; Melbourne, Australia; Grand Slam tournament Hard, outdoor 15 – 28 January 2001	106	2R	(France) Nicolas Escudé	46	Win	6–1, 6–4, 6–4
Australian Open; Melbourne, Australia; Grand Slam tournament Hard, outdoor 15 – 28 January 2001	107	3R	(France) Arnaud Clément (15)	18	Loss	6–7^{(5–7)}, 4–6, 4–6
Milan Indoor; Milan, Italy; ATP 250; Carpet, indoor 29 January – 4 February 2001
Milan Indoor; Milan, Italy; ATP 250; Carpet, indoor 29 January – 4 February 2001	108	1R	(Germany) Rainer Schüttler	48	Win	6–3, 6–4
Milan Indoor; Milan, Italy; ATP 250; Carpet, indoor 29 January – 4 February 2001	109	2R	(France) Cyril Saulnier (Q)	120	Win	2–6, 6–3, 6–4
Milan Indoor; Milan, Italy; ATP 250; Carpet, indoor 29 January – 4 February 2001	110	QF	(Croatia) Goran Ivanišević (WC)	123	Win	6–4, 6–4
Milan Indoor; Milan, Italy; ATP 250; Carpet, indoor 29 January – 4 February 2001	111	SF	(Russia) Yevgeny Kafelnikov (2)	7	Win	6–2, 6–7^{(4–7)}, 6–3
Milan Indoor; Milan, Italy; ATP 250; Carpet, indoor 29 January – 4 February 2001	112	W	(France) Julien Boutter	67	Win (1)	6–4, 6–7^{(7–9)}, 6–4
Davis Cup, World Group; Basel, Switzerland; Davis Cup; Hard, indoor 9 – 11 February 2001
Davis Cup, World Group; Basel, Switzerland; Davis Cup; Hard, indoor 9 – 11 February 2001	113	1R; R1	(United States) Todd Martin	37	Win	6–4, 7–6^{(7–3)}, 4–6, 6–1
Davis Cup, World Group; Basel, Switzerland; Davis Cup; Hard, indoor 9 – 11 February 2001	114	1R; R4	(United States) Jan-Michael Gambill	28	Win	7–5, 6–2, 4–6, 6–2
Open 13; Marseille, France; ATP 250; Hard, indoor 12 – 19 February 2001
Open 13; Marseille, France; ATP 250; Hard, indoor 12 – 19 February 2001	115	1R	(France) Cyril Saulnier (WC)	114	Win	7–6^{(9–7)}, 6–4
Open 13; Marseille, France; ATP 250; Hard, indoor 12 – 19 February 2001	116	2R	(United States) Bob Bryan (Q)	146	Win	7–6^{(7–1)}, 6–3
Open 13; Marseille, France; ATP 250; Hard, indoor 12 – 19 February 2001	117	QF	(Switzerland) Michel Kratochvil	78	Win	6–4, 7–6^{(7–4)}
Open 13; Marseille, France; ATP 250; Hard, indoor 12 – 19 February 2001	118	SF	(Russia) Yevgeny Kafelnikov (2)	7	Loss	7–6^{(7–4)}, 4–6, 4–6
ABN AMRO World Tennis Tournament; Rotterdam, Netherlands; ATP 500; Hard, indoor 19 – 25 February 2001
ABN AMRO World Tennis Tournament; Rotterdam, Netherlands; ATP 500; Hard, indoor 19 – 25 February 2001	119	1R	(Australia) Andrew Ilie	42	Win	7–6^{(7–5)}, 6–1
ABN AMRO World Tennis Tournament; Rotterdam, Netherlands; ATP 500; Hard, indoor 19 – 25 February 2001	120	2R	(France) Sébastien Grosjean (7)	13	Win	4–6, 6–3, 6–4
ABN AMRO World Tennis Tournament; Rotterdam, Netherlands; ATP 500; Hard, indoor 19 – 25 February 2001	121	QF	(Spain) Àlex Corretja (3)	8	Win	6–4, 6–2
ABN AMRO World Tennis Tournament; Rotterdam, Netherlands; ATP 500; Hard, indoor 19 – 25 February 2001	122	SF	(Romania) Andrei Pavel	24	Win	6–7^{(4–7)}, 6–4, 6–0
ABN AMRO World Tennis Tournament; Rotterdam, Netherlands; ATP 500; Hard, indoor 19 – 25 February 2001	123	F	(France) Nicolas Escudé (Q)	60	Loss (3)	5–7, 6–3, 6–7^{(5–7)}
Indian Wells Open; Indian Wells, United States; ATP 1000; Hard, outdoor 8 – 18 March 2001
Indian Wells Open; Indian Wells, United States; ATP 1000; Hard, outdoor 8 – 18 March 2001	124	1R	(Germany) Nicolas Kiefer	43	Loss	6–3, 5–7, 1–6
Ericsson Open; Miami, United States; ATP 1000; Hard, outdoor 21 March – 1 April 2001
Ericsson Open; Miami, United States; ATP 1000; Hard, outdoor 21 March – 1 April 2001	–	1R	Bye			
Ericsson Open; Miami, United States; ATP 1000; Hard, outdoor 21 March – 1 April 2001	125	2R	(Morocco) Younes El Aynaoui	58	Win	6–2, 6–2
Ericsson Open; Miami, United States; ATP 1000; Hard, outdoor 21 March – 1 April 2001	126	3R	(Australia) Mark Philippoussis (16)	16	Win	3–6, 7–6^{(7–4)}, 6–2
Ericsson Open; Miami, United States; ATP 1000; Hard, outdoor 21 March – 1 April 2001	127	4R	(Sweden) Thomas Johansson (25)	25	Win	7–6^{(7–3)}, 5–7, 7–6^{(9–7)}
Ericsson Open; Miami, United States; ATP 1000; Hard, outdoor 21 March – 1 April 2001	128	QF	(Australia) Patrick Rafter (8)	8	Loss	3–6, 1–6
Davis Cup, World Group; Neuchâtel, Switzerland; Davis Cup; Carpet, indoor 6 – 8 April 2001
Davis Cup, World Group; Neuchâtel, Switzerland; Davis Cup; Carpet, indoor 6 – 8 April 2001	129	QF; R2	(France) Nicolas Escudé	34	Loss	4–6, 7–6^{(7–1)}, 3–6, 4–6
Davis Cup, World Group; Neuchâtel, Switzerland; Davis Cup; Carpet, indoor 6 – 8 April 2001	130	QF; R4	(France) Arnaud Clément	10	Win	6–4, 3–6, 7–6^{(7–5)}, 6–4
Monte Carlo Masters; Monte Carlo, Monaco; ATP 1000; Clay, outdoor 16 – 22 April 2001
Monte Carlo Masters; Monte Carlo, Monaco; ATP 1000; Clay, outdoor 16 – 22 April 2001	131	1R	(United States) Michael Chang	33	Win	6–4, 6–3
Monte Carlo Masters; Monte Carlo, Monaco; ATP 1000; Clay, outdoor 16 – 22 April 2001	132	2R	(Italy) Davide Sanguinetti	55	Win	7–6^{(7–5)}, 7–6^{(7–0)}
Monte Carlo Masters; Monte Carlo, Monaco; ATP 1000; Clay, outdoor 16 – 22 April 2001	133	3R	(France) Arnaud Di Pasquale	67	Win	6–1, 6–2
Monte Carlo Masters; Monte Carlo, Monaco; ATP 1000; Clay, outdoor 16 – 22 April 2001	134	QF	(France) Sébastien Grosjean (9)	15	Loss	4–6, 3–6
Rome Masters; Rome, Italy; ATP 1000; Clay, outdoor 7 – 13 May 2001
Rome Masters; Rome, Italy; ATP 1000; Clay, outdoor 7 – 13 May 2001	135	1R	(Sweden) Thomas Johansson	24	Win	7–6^{(7–3)}, 4–6, 7–6^{(7–5)}
Rome Masters; Rome, Italy; ATP 1000; Clay, outdoor 7 – 13 May 2001	136	2R	(Russia) Marat Safin (2)	2	Win	4–6, 6–4, 7–6^{(7–5)}
Rome Masters; Rome, Italy; ATP 1000; Clay, outdoor 7 – 13 May 2001	137	3R	(South Africa) Wayne Ferreira	19	Loss	6–7^{(4–7)}, 2–6
Hamburg Masters; Hamburg, Germany; ATP 1000; Clay, outdoor 14 – 20 May 2001
Hamburg Masters; Hamburg, Germany; ATP 1000; Clay, outdoor 14 – 20 May 2001	138	1R	(Argentina) Franco Squillari	19	Loss	3–6, 4–6
French Open; Paris, France; Grand Slam tournament Clay, outdoor 28 May – 10 June 2001
French Open; Paris, France; Grand Slam tournament Clay, outdoor 28 May – 10 June 2001	139	1R	(Italy) Stefano Galvani (Q)	239	Win	6–3, 6–3, 6–3
French Open; Paris, France; Grand Slam tournament Clay, outdoor 28 May – 10 June 2001	140	2R	(Armenia) Sargis Sargsian	115	Win	4–6, 3–6, 6–2, 6–4, 9–7
French Open; Paris, France; Grand Slam tournament Clay, outdoor 28 May – 10 June 2001	141	3R	(Spain) David Sánchez	89	Win	6–4, 6–3, 1–6, 6–3
French Open; Paris, France; Grand Slam tournament Clay, outdoor 28 May – 10 June 2001	142	4R	(Australia) Wayne Arthurs	59	Win	3–6, 6–3, 6–4, 6–2
French Open; Paris, France; Grand Slam tournament Clay, outdoor 28 May – 10 June 2001	143	QF	(Spain) Àlex Corretja (13)	13	Loss	5–7, 4–6, 5–7
Gerry Weber Open; Halle, Germany; ATP 250; Grass, outdoor 11 – 17 June 2001
Gerry Weber Open; Halle, Germany; ATP 250; Grass, outdoor 11 – 17 June 2001	144	1R	(Spain) Albert Portas	23	Win	6–7^{(4–7)}, 6–4, 6–2
Gerry Weber Open; Halle, Germany; ATP 250; Grass, outdoor 11 – 17 June 2001	145	2R	(Germany) David Prinosil	28	Win	7–6^{(10–8)}, 7–5
Gerry Weber Open; Halle, Germany; ATP 250; Grass, outdoor 11 – 17 June 2001	146	QF	(Australia) Patrick Rafter (2)	10	Loss	6–4, 6–7^{(6–8)}, 6–7^{(4–7)}
Heineken Trophy 's-Hertogenbosch, Netherlands; ATP 250; Grass, outdoor 18 – 24 June 2001
Heineken Trophy 's-Hertogenbosch, Netherlands; ATP 250; Grass, outdoor 18 – 24 June 2001	147	1R	(France) Antony Dupuis	68	Win	7–6^{(7–3)}, 6–4
Heineken Trophy 's-Hertogenbosch, Netherlands; ATP 250; Grass, outdoor 18 – 24 June 2001	148	2R	(Netherlands) John van Lottum (WC)	193	Win	6–0, 6–1
Heineken Trophy 's-Hertogenbosch, Netherlands; ATP 250; Grass, outdoor 18 – 24 June 2001	149	QF	(Netherlands) Raemon Sluiter	107	Win	6–7^{(4–7)}, 6–4, 6–4
Heineken Trophy 's-Hertogenbosch, Netherlands; ATP 250; Grass, outdoor 18 – 24 June 2001	150	SF	(Australia) Lleyton Hewitt (1)	6	Loss	4–6, 2–6
The Championships, Wimbledon; London, United Kingdom; Grand Slam tournament Grass, outdoor 25 June – 9 July 2001
The Championships, Wimbledon; London, United Kingdom; Grand Slam tournament Grass, outdoor 25 June – 9 July 2001	151	1R	(Belgium) Christophe Rochus	63	Win	6–2, 6–3, 6–2
The Championships, Wimbledon; London, United Kingdom; Grand Slam tournament Grass, outdoor 25 June – 9 July 2001	152	2R	(Belgium) Xavier Malisse	53	Win	6–3, 7–5, 3–6, 4–6, 6–3
The Championships, Wimbledon; London, United Kingdom; Grand Slam tournament Grass, outdoor 25 June – 9 July 2001	153	3R	(Sweden) Jonas Björkman (33)	41	Win	7–6^{(7–4)}, 6–3, 7–6^{(7–2)}
The Championships, Wimbledon; London, United Kingdom; Grand Slam tournament Grass, outdoor 25 June – 9 July 2001	154	4R	(United States) Pete Sampras (1)	6	Win	7–6^{(9–7)}, 5–7, 6–4, 6–7^{(2–7)}, 7–5
The Championships, Wimbledon; London, United Kingdom; Grand Slam tournament Grass, outdoor 25 June – 9 July 2001	155	QF	(United Kingdom) Tim Henman (6)	11	Loss	5–7, 6–7^{(6–8)}, 6–2, 6–7^{(6–8)}
UBS Open; Gstaad, Switzerland; ATP 250; Clay, outdoor 9 – 15 July 2001
UBS Open; Gstaad, Switzerland; ATP 250; Clay, outdoor 9 – 15 July 2001	156	1R	(Croatia) Ivan Ljubičić	70	Loss	2–6, 1–6
US Open; New York City, United States; Grand Slam tournament Hard, outdoor 27 August – 9 September 2001
US Open; New York City, United States; Grand Slam tournament Hard, outdoor 27 August – 9 September 2001	157	1R	(Germany) Lars Burgsmüller	72	Win	6–4, 6–4, 6–4
US Open; New York City, United States; Grand Slam tournament Hard, outdoor 27 August – 9 September 2001	158	2R	(United States) Robby Ginepri (WC)	327	Win	6–2, 7–5, 6–1
US Open; New York City, United States; Grand Slam tournament Hard, outdoor 27 August – 9 September 2001	159	3R	(Netherlands) Sjeng Schalken (24)	24	Win	6–4, 7–5, 7–6^{(7–3)}
US Open; New York City, United States; Grand Slam tournament Hard, outdoor 27 August – 9 September 2001	160	4R	(United States) Andre Agassi (2)	2	Loss	1–6, 2–6, 4–6
Kremlin Cup; Moscow, Russia; ATP 250; Carpet, indoor 1 – 7 October 2001
Kremlin Cup; Moscow, Russia; ATP 250; Carpet, indoor 1 – 7 October 2001	161	1R	(Germany) Nicolas Kiefer	39	Loss	3–6, 6–1, 6–7^{(4–7)}
CA-TennisTrophy; Vienna, Austria; ATP 500; Hard, indoor 8 – 14 October 2001
CA-TennisTrophy; Vienna, Austria; ATP 500; Hard, indoor 8 – 14 October 2001	162	1R	(Chile) Nicolás Massú (LL)	78	Win	4–6, 7–6^{(10–8)}, 6–4
CA-TennisTrophy; Vienna, Austria; ATP 500; Hard, indoor 8 – 14 October 2001	163	2R	(Spain) Albert Costa	33	Win	7–6^{(7–1)}, 6–2
CA-TennisTrophy; Vienna, Austria; ATP 500; Hard, indoor 8 – 14 October 2001	164	QF	(Austria) Stefan Koubek (WC)	90	Loss	6–7^{(3–7)}, 5–7
Stuttgart Masters; Stuttgart, Germany; ATP 1000; Hard, indoor 15 – 22 October 2001
Stuttgart Masters; Stuttgart, Germany; ATP 1000; Hard, indoor 15 – 22 October 2001	–	1R	Bye			
Stuttgart Masters; Stuttgart, Germany; ATP 1000; Hard, indoor 15 – 22 October 2001	165	2R	(South Africa) Wayne Ferreira	36	Loss	6–7^{(1–7)}, 6–3, 2–6
Davidoff Swiss Indoors; Basel, Switzerland; ATP 250; Carpet indoor 22 – 28 October 2001
Davidoff Swiss Indoors; Basel, Switzerland; ATP 250; Carpet indoor 22 – 28 October 2001	166	1R	(Spain) Albert Costa	34	Win	6–3, 6–3
Davidoff Swiss Indoors; Basel, Switzerland; ATP 250; Carpet indoor 22 – 28 October 2001	167	2R	(Belgium) Xavier Malisse	39	Win	6–3, 6–4
Davidoff Swiss Indoors; Basel, Switzerland; ATP 250; Carpet indoor 22 – 28 October 2001	168	QF	(United States) Andy Roddick (6)	16	Win	3–6, 6–3, 7–6^{(7–5)}
Davidoff Swiss Indoors; Basel, Switzerland; ATP 250; Carpet indoor 22 – 28 October 2001	169	SF	(France) Julien Boutter	64	Win	7–6^{(7–3)}, 6–4
Davidoff Swiss Indoors; Basel, Switzerland; ATP 250; Carpet indoor 22 – 28 October 2001	170	F	(United Kingdom) Tim Henman (2)	11	Loss (4)	3–6, 4–6, 2–6
Paris Masters; Paris, France; ATP 1000; Carpet indoor 29 October – 5 November 2001
Paris Masters; Paris, France; ATP 1000; Carpet indoor 29 October – 5 November 2001	–	1R	Bye			
Paris Masters; Paris, France; ATP 1000; Carpet indoor 29 October – 5 November 2001	171	2R	(Czech Republic) Jiří Novák	40	Loss	4–6, 7–6^{(7–4)}, 6–7^{(2–7)}

==== 2002 ====
Tournament	Match	Round	Opponent (seed or key)	Rank	Result	Score
Adidas International; Sydney, Australia; ATP 250; Hard, outdoor 6 – 13 January 2002
Adidas International; Sydney, Australia; ATP 250; Hard, outdoor 6 – 13 January 2002	172	1R	(Spain) Tommy Robredo	34	Win	7–6^{(7–5)}, 7–6^{(7–5)}
Adidas International; Sydney, Australia; ATP 250; Hard, outdoor 6 – 13 January 2002	173	2R	(Belgium) Xavier Malisse	31	Win	6–2, 6–4
Adidas International; Sydney, Australia; ATP 250; Hard, outdoor 6 – 13 January 2002	174	QF	(Chile) Marcelo Ríos	47	Win	6–7^{(2–7)}, 7–6^{(7–4)}, 6–3
Adidas International; Sydney, Australia; ATP 250; Hard, outdoor 6 – 13 January 2002	175	SF	(United States) Andy Roddick (3/WC)	15	Win	7–6^{(7–3)}, 6–4
Adidas International; Sydney, Australia; ATP 250; Hard, outdoor 6 – 13 January 2002	176	W	(Argentina) Juan Ignacio Chela (Q)	67	Win (2)	6–3, 6–3
Australian Open; Melbourne, Australia; Grand Slam tournament Hard, outdoor 14 – 27 January 2002
Australian Open; Melbourne, Australia; Grand Slam tournament Hard, outdoor 14 – 27 January 2002	177	1R	(United States) Michael Chang	94	Win	6–4, 6–4, 6–3
Australian Open; Melbourne, Australia; Grand Slam tournament Hard, outdoor 14 – 27 January 2002	178	2R	(Hungary) Attila Sávolt	93	Win	6–2, 7–5, 6–4
Australian Open; Melbourne, Australia; Grand Slam tournament Hard, outdoor 14 – 27 January 2002	179	3R	(Germany) Rainer Schüttler	41	Win	7–6^{(8–6)}, 7–6^{(7–5)}, 6–4
Australian Open; Melbourne, Australia; Grand Slam tournament Hard, outdoor 14 – 27 January 2002	180	4R	(Germany) Tommy Haas (7)	9	Loss	6–7^{(3–7)}, 6–4, 6–3, 4–6, 6–8
Milan Indoor; Milan, Italy; ATP 250; Carpet, indoor 28 January – 3 February 2002
Milan Indoor; Milan, Italy; ATP 250; Carpet, indoor 28 January – 3 February 2002	181	1R	(Austria) Stefan Koubek	50	Win	7–6^{(7–2)}, 6–3
Milan Indoor; Milan, Italy; ATP 250; Carpet, indoor 28 January – 3 February 2002	182	2R	(Russia) Nikolay Davydenko	84	Win	6–3, 6–7^{(4–7)}, 7–5
Milan Indoor; Milan, Italy; ATP 250; Carpet, indoor 28 January – 3 February 2002	183	QF	(Armenia) Sargis Sargsian	74	Win	4–6, 6–3, 6–3
Milan Indoor; Milan, Italy; ATP 250; Carpet, indoor 28 January – 3 February 2002	184	SF	(United Kingdom) Greg Rusedski (7)	30	Win	7–6^{(9–7)}, 7–6^{(7–4)}
Milan Indoor; Milan, Italy; ATP 250; Carpet, indoor 28 January – 3 February 2002	185	F	(Italy) Davide Sanguinetti	87	Loss (5)	6–7^{(2–7)}, 6–4, 1–6
Davis Cup, World Group; Moscow, Russia; Davis Cup; Clay, indoor 8 – 10 February 2002
Davis Cup, World Group; Moscow, Russia; Davis Cup; Clay, indoor 8 – 10 February 2002	186	1R; R1	(Russia) Marat Safin	7	Win	7–5, 6–1, 6–2
Davis Cup, World Group; Moscow, Russia; Davis Cup; Clay, indoor 8 – 10 February 2002	187	1R; R4	(Russia) Yevgeny Kafelnikov	4	Win	7–6^{(8–6)}, 6–1, 6–1
ABN AMRO World Tennis Tournament; Rotterdam, Netherlands; ATP 500; Hard, indoor 18 – 24 February 2002
ABN AMRO World Tennis Tournament; Rotterdam, Netherlands; ATP 500; Hard, indoor 18 – 24 February 2002	188	1R	(Netherlands) John van Lottum (WC)	124	Win	6–3, 6–4
ABN AMRO World Tennis Tournament; Rotterdam, Netherlands; ATP 500; Hard, indoor 18 – 24 February 2002	–	2R	(Sweden) Thomas Enqvist	20	Walkover	N/A
ABN AMRO World Tennis Tournament; Rotterdam, Netherlands; ATP 500; Hard, indoor 18 – 24 February 2002	189	QF	(France) Nicolas Escudé	22	Loss	6–3, 6–7^{(8–10)}, 5–7
Dubai Tennis Championships; Dubai, United Arab Emirates; ATP 500; Hard, outdoor 25 February – 3 March 2002
Dubai Tennis Championships; Dubai, United Arab Emirates; ATP 500; Hard, outdoor 25 February – 3 March 2002	190	1R	(Romania) Adrian Voinea (Q)	76	Win	6–3, 6–4
Dubai Tennis Championships; Dubai, United Arab Emirates; ATP 500; Hard, outdoor 25 February – 3 March 2002	191	2R	(Germany) Rainer Schüttler	40	Loss	3–6, 1–6
Pacific Life Open; Indian Wells, United States; ATP 1000; Hard, outdoor 6 – 17 March 2002
Pacific Life Open; Indian Wells, United States; ATP 1000; Hard, outdoor 6 – 17 March 2002	192	1R	(Belgium) Xavier Malisse	32	Win	6–7^{(5–7)}, 7–6^{(7–3)}, 6–3
Pacific Life Open; Indian Wells, United States; ATP 1000; Hard, outdoor 6 – 17 March 2002	193	2R	(Austria) Stefan Koubek	50	Win	6–4, 6–4
Pacific Life Open; Indian Wells, United States; ATP 1000; Hard, outdoor 6 – 17 March 2002	194	3R	(Sweden) Thomas Enqvist	22	Loss	4–6, 3–6
NASDAQ-100 Open; Miami, United States; ATP 1000; Hard, outdoor 18 – 31 March 2002
NASDAQ-100 Open; Miami, United States; ATP 1000; Hard, outdoor 18 – 31 March 2002	–	1R	Bye			
NASDAQ-100 Open; Miami, United States; ATP 1000; Hard, outdoor 18 – 31 March 2002	195	2R	(United States) Jeff Morrison (Q)	139	Win	6–1, 7–6^{(8–6)}
NASDAQ-100 Open; Miami, United States; ATP 1000; Hard, outdoor 18 – 31 March 2002	196	3R	(Spain) Albert Portas (23)	25	Win	6–4, 6–1
NASDAQ-100 Open; Miami, United States; ATP 1000; Hard, outdoor 18 – 31 March 2002	197	4R	(United Kingdom) Tim Henman (5)	6	Win	6–2, retired
NASDAQ-100 Open; Miami, United States; ATP 1000; Hard, outdoor 18 – 31 March 2002	198	QF	(Romania) Andrei Pavel (26)	28	Win	6–1, 6–1
NASDAQ-100 Open; Miami, United States; ATP 1000; Hard, outdoor 18 – 31 March 2002	199	SF	(Australia) Lleyton Hewitt (1)	1	Win	6–3, 6–4
NASDAQ-100 Open; Miami, United States; ATP 1000; Hard, outdoor 18 – 31 March 2002	200	F	(United States) Andre Agassi (9)	10	Loss (6)	3–6, 3–6, 6–3, 4–6
Monte Carlo Masters; Monte Carlo, Monaco; ATP 1000; Clay, outdoor 15 – 21 April 2002
Monte Carlo Masters; Monte Carlo, Monaco; ATP 1000; Clay, outdoor 15 – 21 April 2002	201	1R	(Argentina) Mariano Zabaleta (Q)	69	Win	7–6^{(7–2)}, 6–4
Monte Carlo Masters; Monte Carlo, Monaco; ATP 1000; Clay, outdoor 15 – 21 April 2002	202	2R	(Argentina) David Nalbandian	35	Loss	2–6, 1–6
Rome Masters; Rome, Italy; ATP 1000; Clay, outdoor 6 – 12 May 2002
Rome Masters; Rome, Italy; ATP 1000; Clay, outdoor 6 – 12 May 2002	203	1R	(Italy) Andrea Gaudenzi	58	Loss	2–6, 1–6
Hamburg Masters; Hamburg, Germany; ATP 1000; Clay, outdoor 13 – 19 May 2002
Hamburg Masters; Hamburg, Germany; ATP 1000; Clay, outdoor 13 – 19 May 2002	204	1R	(Ecuador) Nicolás Lapentti	29	Win	6–1, 6–4
Hamburg Masters; Hamburg, Germany; ATP 1000; Clay, outdoor 13 – 19 May 2002	205	2R	(Czech Republic) Bohdan Ulihrach	42	Win	6–3, 6–0
Hamburg Masters; Hamburg, Germany; ATP 1000; Clay, outdoor 13 – 19 May 2002	206	3R	(Romania) Adrian Voinea (Q)	67	Win	7–5, 6–4
Hamburg Masters; Hamburg, Germany; ATP 1000; Clay, outdoor 13 – 19 May 2002	207	QF	(Brazil) Gustavo Kuerten (2)	7	Win	6–0, 1–6, 6–2
Hamburg Masters; Hamburg, Germany; ATP 1000; Clay, outdoor 13 – 19 May 2002	208	SF	(Belarus) Max Mirnyi	39	Win	6–4, 6–4
Hamburg Masters; Hamburg, Germany; ATP 1000; Clay, outdoor 13 – 19 May 2002	209	W	(Russia) Marat Safin (6)	5	Win (3)	6–1, 6–3, 6–4
French Open; Paris, France; Grand Slam tournament Clay, outdoor 27 May – 9 June 2002
French Open; Paris, France; Grand Slam tournament Clay, outdoor 27 May – 9 June 2002	210	1R	(Morocco) Hicham Arazi	45	Loss	3–6, 2–6, 4–6
Gerry Weber Open; Halle, Germany; ATP 250; Grass, outdoor 10 – 16 June 2002
Gerry Weber Open; Halle, Germany; ATP 250; Grass, outdoor 10 – 16 June 2002	211	1R	(Germany) Hendrik Dreekmann (WC)	–	Win	6–7^{(5–7)}, 6–3, 6–4
Gerry Weber Open; Halle, Germany; ATP 250; Grass, outdoor 10 – 16 June 2002	212	2R	(Germany) David Prinosil (Q)	206	Win	6–2, 6–4
Gerry Weber Open; Halle, Germany; ATP 250; Grass, outdoor 10 – 16 June 2002	213	QF	(Russia) Mikhail Youzhny	67	Win	6–3, 6–4
Gerry Weber Open; Halle, Germany; ATP 250; Grass, outdoor 10 – 16 June 2002	214	SF	(Germany) Nicolas Kiefer	66	Loss	6–4, 4–6, 4–6
Ordina Open 's-Hertogenbosch, Netherlands; ATP 250; Grass, outdoor 17 – 23 June 2002
Ordina Open 's-Hertogenbosch, Netherlands; ATP 250; Grass, outdoor 17 – 23 June 2002	215	1R	(Netherlands) Richard Krajicek (WC)	–	Win	6–2, 7–5
Ordina Open 's-Hertogenbosch, Netherlands; ATP 250; Grass, outdoor 17 – 23 June 2002	216	2R	(Switzerland) Ivo Heuberger	127	Win	6–4, retired
Ordina Open 's-Hertogenbosch, Netherlands; ATP 250; Grass, outdoor 17 – 23 June 2002	217	QF	(Netherlands) Sjeng Schalken (6)	31	Loss	6–3, 5–7, 3–6
The Championships, Wimbledon; London, United Kingdom; Grand Slam tournament Grass, outdoor 24 June – 7 July 2002
The Championships, Wimbledon; London, United Kingdom; Grand Slam tournament Grass, outdoor 24 June – 7 July 2002	218	1R	(Croatia) Mario Ančić (Q)	154	Loss	3–6, 6–7^{(2–7)}, 3–6
Allianz Suisse Open; Gstaad, Switzerland; ATP 250; Clay, outdoor 8 – 14 July 2002
Allianz Suisse Open; Gstaad, Switzerland; ATP 250; Clay, outdoor 8 – 14 July 2002	219	1R	(Morocco) Hicham Arazi	46	Win	6–4, 6–3
Allianz Suisse Open; Gstaad, Switzerland; ATP 250; Clay, outdoor 8 – 14 July 2002	220	2R	(Czech Republic) Radek Štěpánek (Q)	110	Loss	6–3, 3–6, 2–6
Canada Masters; Toronto, Canada; ATP 1000; Hard, outdoor 29 July – 4 August 2002
Canada Masters; Toronto, Canada; ATP 1000; Hard, outdoor 29 July – 4 August 2002	221	1R	(Argentina) Guillermo Cañas	19	Loss	6–7^{(10–12)}, 5–7
W&S Financial Group Masters; Cincinnati, United States; ATP 1000; Hard, outdoor 5 – 12 August 2002
W&S Financial Group Masters; Cincinnati, United States; ATP 1000; Hard, outdoor 5 – 12 August 2002	222	1R	(Croatia) Ivan Ljubičić	34	Loss	6–2, 4–6, 3–6
TD Waterhouse Cup; Long Island, United States; ATP 250; Hard, outdoor 19 – 25 August 2002
TD Waterhouse Cup; Long Island, United States; ATP 250; Hard, outdoor 19 – 25 August 2002	–	1R	Bye			
TD Waterhouse Cup; Long Island, United States; ATP 250; Hard, outdoor 19 – 25 August 2002	223	2R	(Chile) Nicolás Massú	65	Loss	7–6^{(7–5)}, 1–6, 3–6
US Open; New York City, United States; Grand Slam tournament Hard, outdoor 26 August – 8 September 2002
US Open; New York City, United States; Grand Slam tournament Hard, outdoor 26 August – 8 September 2002	224	1R	(Czech Republic) Jiří Vaněk	157	Win	6–1, 6–3, 4–6, 7–5
US Open; New York City, United States; Grand Slam tournament Hard, outdoor 26 August – 8 September 2002	225	2R	(United States) Michael Chang	132	Win	6–3, 6–1, 6–3
US Open; New York City, United States; Grand Slam tournament Hard, outdoor 26 August – 8 September 2002	226	3R	(Belgium) Xavier Malisse (19)	19	Win	4–6, 6–3, 6–4, 6–4
US Open; New York City, United States; Grand Slam tournament Hard, outdoor 26 August – 8 September 2002	227	4R	(Belarus) Max Mirnyi (32)	34	Loss	3–6, 6–7^{(5–7)}, 4–6
Davis Cup, World Group; Casablanca, Morocco; Davis Cup; Clay, outdoor 20 – 22 September 2002
Davis Cup, World Group; Casablanca, Morocco; Davis Cup; Clay, outdoor 20 – 22 September 2002	228	PO; R1	(Morocco) Hicham Arazi	70	Win	6–3, 6–2, 6–1
Davis Cup, World Group; Casablanca, Morocco; Davis Cup; Clay, outdoor 20 – 22 September 2002	229	PO; R4	(Morocco) Younes El Aynaoui	19	Win	6–3, 6–2, 6–1
Kremlin Cup; Moscow, Russia; ATP 250; Carpet, indoor 30 September – 6 October 2002
Kremlin Cup; Moscow, Russia; ATP 250; Carpet, indoor 30 September – 6 October 2002	230	1R	(Russia) Denis Golovanov (WC)	167	Win	6–0, 6–1
Kremlin Cup; Moscow, Russia; ATP 250; Carpet, indoor 30 September – 6 October 2002	231	2R	(Finland) Jarkko Nieminen	35	Win	6–1, 6–4
Kremlin Cup; Moscow, Russia; ATP 250; Carpet, indoor 30 September – 6 October 2002	232	QF	(Russia) Marat Safin (1)	4	Loss	5–7, 4–6
CA-TennisTrophy; Vienna, Austria; ATP 500; Hard, indoor 7 – 13 October 2002
CA-TennisTrophy; Vienna, Austria; ATP 500; Hard, indoor 7 – 13 October 2002	233	1R	(Croatia) Željko Krajan (Q)	115	Win	7–5, 6–1
CA-TennisTrophy; Vienna, Austria; ATP 500; Hard, indoor 7 – 13 October 2002	234	2R	(Spain) Tommy Robredo	36	Win	6–2, 6–7^{(5–7)}, 6–4
CA-TennisTrophy; Vienna, Austria; ATP 500; Hard, indoor 7 – 13 October 2002	235	QF	(Czech Republic) Bohdan Ulihrach (Q)	73	Win	6–3, 6–3
CA-TennisTrophy; Vienna, Austria; ATP 500; Hard, indoor 7 – 13 October 2002	236	SF	(Spain) Carlos Moyá (4)	9	Win	6–2, 6–3
CA-TennisTrophy; Vienna, Austria; ATP 500; Hard, indoor 7 – 13 October 2002	237	W	(Czech Republic) Jiří Novák (5)	12	Win (4)	6–4, 6–1, 3–6, 6–4
Mutua Madrileña Masters; Madrid, Spain; ATP 1000; Hard, indoor 14 – 20 October 2002
Mutua Madrileña Masters; Madrid, Spain; ATP 1000; Hard, indoor 14 – 20 October 2002	–	1R	Bye			
Mutua Madrileña Masters; Madrid, Spain; ATP 1000; Hard, indoor 14 – 20 October 2002	238	2R	(Chile) Marcelo Ríos	25	Win	6–4, 6–2
Mutua Madrileña Masters; Madrid, Spain; ATP 1000; Hard, indoor 14 – 20 October 2002	239	3R	(Ecuador) Nicolás Lapentti	30	Win	6–3, 6–4
Mutua Madrileña Masters; Madrid, Spain; ATP 1000; Hard, indoor 14 – 20 October 2002	240	QF	(France) Fabrice Santoro (Q)	50	Loss	5–7, 3–6
Davidoff Swiss Indoors; Basel, Switzerland; ATP 500; Carpet, indoor 21 – 27 October 2002
Davidoff Swiss Indoors; Basel, Switzerland; ATP 500; Carpet, indoor 21 – 27 October 2002	241	1R	(Netherlands) Martin Verkerk (LL)	92	Win	6–3, 6–3
Davidoff Swiss Indoors; Basel, Switzerland; ATP 500; Carpet, indoor 21 – 27 October 2002	242	2R	(Germany) Alexander Waske (Q)	143	Win	6–3, 7–6^{(7–1)}
Davidoff Swiss Indoors; Basel, Switzerland; ATP 500; Carpet, indoor 21 – 27 October 2002	243	QF	(United States) Andy Roddick (5)	12	Win	7–6^{(7–5)}, 6–1
Davidoff Swiss Indoors; Basel, Switzerland; ATP 500; Carpet, indoor 21 – 27 October 2002	244	SF	(Argentina) David Nalbandian (6)	18	Loss	7–6^{(7–2)}, 5–7, 3–6
BNP Paribas Masters; Paris, France; ATP 1000; Carpet, indoor 28 October – 3 November 2002
BNP Paribas Masters; Paris, France; ATP 1000; Carpet, indoor 28 October – 3 November 2002	–	1R	Bye			
BNP Paribas Masters; Paris, France; ATP 1000; Carpet, indoor 28 October – 3 November 2002	245	2R	(Belgium) Xavier Malisse	26	Win	6–2, 6–4
BNP Paribas Masters; Paris, France; ATP 1000; Carpet, indoor 28 October – 3 November 2002	246	3R	(Germany) Tommy Haas (9)	7	Win	6–2, 7–6^{(7–2)}
BNP Paribas Masters; Paris, France; ATP 1000; Carpet, indoor 28 October – 3 November 2002	247	QF	(Australia) Lleyton Hewitt (1)	1	Loss	4–6, 4–6
Tennis Masters Cup; Shanghai, China; ATP Finals; Hard, indoor 12 – 18 November 2002
Tennis Masters Cup; Shanghai, China; ATP Finals; Hard, indoor 12 – 18 November 2002	248	RR	(Spain) Juan Carlos Ferrero (4)	4	Win	6–3, 6–4
Tennis Masters Cup; Shanghai, China; ATP Finals; Hard, indoor 12 – 18 November 2002	249	RR	(Czech Republic) Jiří Novák (7)	7	Win	6–0, 4–6, 6–2
Tennis Masters Cup; Shanghai, China; ATP Finals; Hard, indoor 12 – 18 November 2002	250	RR	(Sweden) Thomas Johansson (9)	14	Win	6–3, 7–5
Tennis Masters Cup; Shanghai, China; ATP Finals; Hard, indoor 12 – 18 November 2002	251	SF	(Australia) Lleyton Hewitt (1)	1	Loss	5–7, 7–5, 5–7

== Yearly records ==
=== Finals ===
==== Singles: 10 (4–6) ====
Legend Grand Slam (0–0) ATP World Tour Finals (0–0) ATP World Tour Masters 1000 (1–1) ATP World Tour 500 Series (1–1) ATP World Tour 250 Series (2–4)	Titles by surface Hard (2–2) Clay (1–0) Grass (0–0) Carpet (1–4)	Titles by surface Outdoors (2–1) Indoors (2–5)

Outcome	No.	Date	Championship	Surface	Opponent in the final	Score in the final
Runner-up	1.	February 13, 2000	Marseille, France	Carpet (i)	(Switzerland) Marc Rosset	6–2, 3–6, 6–7^{(5–7)}
Runner-up	2.	October 29, 2000	Basel, Switzerland	Carpet (i)	(Sweden) Thomas Enqvist	2–6, 6–4, 6–7^{(4–7)}, 6–1, 1–6
Winner	1.	February 4, 2001	Milan, Italy	Carpet (i)	(France) Julien Boutter	6–4, 6–7^{(7–9)}, 6–4
Runner-up	3.	February 25, 2001	Rotterdam, Netherlands	Hard (i)	(France) Nicolas Escudé	5–7, 6–3, 6–7^{(5–7)}
Runner-up	4.	October 28, 2001	Basel, Switzerland (2)	Carpet (i)	(United Kingdom) Tim Henman	3–6, 4–6, 2–6
Winner	2.	January 13, 2002	Sydney, Australia	Hard	(Argentina) Juan Ignacio Chela	6–3, 6–3
Runner-up	5.	February 3, 2002	Milan, Italy	Carpet (i)	(Italy) Davide Sanguinetti	6–7^{(2–7)}, 6–4, 1–6
Runner-up	6.	March 31, 2002	Miami, United States	Hard	(United States) Andre Agassi	3–6, 3–6, 6–3, 4–6
Winner	3.	May 19, 2002	Hamburg, Germany	Clay	(Russia) Marat Safin	6–1, 6–3, 6–4
Winner	4.	October 13, 2002	Vienna, Austria	Hard (i)	(Czech Republic) Jiří Novák	6–4, 6–1, 3–6, 6–4

== See also ==
- Roger Federer
- Roger Federer career statistics
