= 1999 Rado Swiss Open Gstaad – Singles =

Singles
- 1999 Rado Swiss Open Gstaad

Final
- Champion: (Spain) Albert Costa
- Runner-up: (Ecuador) Nicolás Lapentti
- Score: 7–6^{(7–4)}, 6–3, 6–4

Details
- Draw: 32 (2WC/4Q/1LL)
- Seeds: 8

Events
Singles	Doubles
← 1998 ·	Swiss Open	· 2000 →

Àlex Corretja was the defending champion, but was forced to withdraw at his first round match against tournament runner-up Nicolás Lapentti.

Albert Costa won the title by defeating Nicolás Lapentti 7–6^{(7–4)}, 6–3, 6–4 in the final.

== Seeds ==
1. (Brazil) Gustavo Kuerten (second round)
2. (Spain) Àlex Corretja (first round, retired)
3. (Chile) Marcelo Ríos (second round)
4. (United Kingdom) Greg Rusedski (first round)
5. (Spain) Félix Mantilla (semifinals)
6. (Spain) Francisco Clavet (quarterfinals)
7. (Argentina) Mariano Zabaleta (second round)
8. (Spain) Albert Costa (champion)

== Draw ==
=== Key ===
- Q = Qualifier
- WC = Wild card
- LL = Lucky loser
- Alt = Alternate
- SE = Special exempt
- PR = Protected ranking
- ITF = ITF entry
- JE = Junior exempt
- w/o = Walkover
- r = Retired
- d = Defaulted
- SR = Special ranking

=== Finals ===
Semifinals
8	(Spain) Albert Costa	4	7^{7}	6
(Morocco) Younes El Aynaoui	6	6^{5}	3
5	(Spain) Félix Mantilla	4	6	5
(Ecuador) Nicolás Lapentti	6	4	7

Final
8	(Spain) Albert Costa	7^{7}	6	6
(Ecuador) Nicolás Lapentti	6^{4}	3	4

=== Top half ===
First round
1	(Brazil) G Kuerten	6	6
(Argentina) M Puerta	4	4
LL	(Italy) R Furlan	3	2
(United States) V Spadea	6	6
(Austria) S Koubek	4	6	6
(Morocco) K Alami	6	4	1
WC	(Switzerland) L Manta	1	1
8	(Spain) A Costa	6	6
3	(Chile) M Ríos	6	6^{7}	7^{7}
(Czech Republic) B Ulihrach	2	7^{9}	6^{1}
(Morocco) Y El Aynaoui	6	6
WC	(Switzerland) R Federer	2	3
(Switzerland) G Bastl	6^{8}	4
Q	(United States) D Johnson	7^{10}	6
Q	(Spain) J Balcells	7	1	6^{4}
6	(Spain) F Clavet	5	6	7^{7}

Second round
1	(Brazil) G Kuerten	2	6	6^{6}
(United States) V Spadea	6	2	7^{8}
(Austria) S Koubek	7^{7}	1	5
8	(Spain) A Costa	6^{3}	6	7
3	(Chile) M Ríos	6^{5}	6^{5}
(Morocco) Y El Aynaoui	7^{7}	7^{7}
Q	(United States) D Johnson	4	4
6	(Spain) F Clavet	6	6

Quarterfinals
(United States) V Spadea	3	2
8	(Spain) A Costa	6	6
(Morocco) Y El Aynaoui	7^{7}	7
6	(Spain) F Clavet	6^{5}	5

Semifinals
8	(Spain) A Costa	4	7^{7}	6
(Morocco) Y El Aynaoui	6	6^{5}	3

=== Bottom half ===
First round
5	(Spain) F Mantilla	6	6
(Argentina) F Squillari	3	2
(Morocco) H Arazi	6	7^{7}
(Czech Republic) J Novák	3	6^{3}
(France) A Di Pasquale	6	5	6
(Brazil) F Meligeni	3	7	0
(Switzerland) M Rosset	7^{7}	6^{4}	6
4	(United Kingdom) G Rusedski	6^{2}	7^{7}	2
7	(Argentina) M Zabaleta	4	6	7^{7}
(France) C Pioline	6	3	6^{4}
(Germany) R Schüttler	2	1
Q	(Italy) A Gaudenzi	6	6
Q	(Croatia) I Ljubičić	6^{5}	6	6
(Czech Republic) D Vacek	7^{7}	4	4
(Ecuador) N Lapentti	4
2	(Spain) À Corretja	3^{r}

Second round
5	(Spain) F Mantilla	6	6
(Morocco) H Arazi	2	0
(France) A Di Pasquale	7	7^{7}
(Switzerland) M Rosset	5	6^{3}
7	(Argentina) M Zabaleta	7^{7}	6^{4}	3
Q	(Italy) A Gaudenzi	6^{5}	7^{7}	6
Q	(Croatia) I Ljubičić	4	6	3
(Ecuador) N Lapentti	6	2	6

Quarterfinals
5	(Spain) F Mantilla	3	6	6
(France) A Di Pasquale	6	3	4
Q	(Italy) A Gaudenzi	5	3
(Ecuador) N Lapentti	7	6

Semifinals
5	(Spain) F Mantilla	4	6	5
(Ecuador) N Lapentti	6	4	7
