= 1999 Rado Swiss Open Gstaad – Doubles =

Doubles
- 1999 Rado Swiss Open Gstaad

Final
- Champions: (United States) Donald Johnson (Czech Republic) Cyril Suk
- Runners-up: (North Macedonia) Aleksandar Kitinov (Philippines) Eric Taino
- Score: 7–5, 7–6^{(7–4)}

Events
Singles	Doubles
← 1998 ·	Swiss Open	· 2000 →

Gustavo Kuerten and Fernando Meligeni were the defending champions, but Meligeni did not compete this year. Kuerten teamed up with Jaime Oncins and lost in quarterfinals to tournament runners-up Aleksandar Kitinov and Eric Taino.

Donald Johnson and Cyril Suk won the title by defeating Aleksandar Kitinov and Eric Taino 7–5, 7–6^{(7–4)} in the final.

== Seeds ==
1. (Czech Republic) Jiří Novák / (Czech Republic) David Rikl (first round)
2. (Czech Republic) Martin Damm / (Czech Republic) Daniel Vacek (semifinals)
3. (United States) Donald Johnson / (Czech Republic) Cyril Suk (champions)
4. (South Africa) Chris Haggard / (Spain) Javier Sánchez (quarterfinals)

== Draw ==
=== Key ===
- Q = Qualifier
- WC = Wild card
- LL = Lucky loser
- Alt = Alternate
- ITF = ITF entry
- PR = Protected ranking
- SR = Special ranking
- SE = Special exempt
- JE = Junior exempt
- JR = Junior Accelerator Programme entrant
- CO = College Accelerator Programme entrant
- NG = Next Gen Accelerator Program entrant
- w/o = Walkover
- r = Retired
- d = Defaulted

=== Draw ===
First round
1	(Czech Republic) J Novák (Czech Republic) D Rikl	4	3
(Brazil) G Kuerten (Brazil) J Oncins	6	6
(North Macedonia) A Kitinov (Philippines) E Taino	6	7
(South Africa) L Bale (New Zealand) J Greenhalgh	4	5
4	(South Africa) C Haggard (Spain) J Sánchez	6	6
(South Africa) R Koenig (Czech Republic) P Vízner	4	4
Q	(Ecuador) N Lapentti (Ecuador) L Morejón	6^{10}	4
(Spain) T Carbonell (Argentina) M Hood	7^{12}	6
(Spain) JI Carrasco (Spain) J Velasco Jr.	4	3
WC	(Switzerland) R Federer (Switzerland) M Rosset	6	6
(Italy) C Brandi (Italy) M Bertolini	2	2
3	(United States) D Johnson (Czech Republic) C Suk	6	6
WC	(Argentina) L Lobo (Chile) M Ríos	6	6
(Argentina) D Orsanic (Argentina) M Puerta	2	4
WC	(Switzerland) G Bastl (Switzerland) L Manta	0	4
2	(Czech Republic) M Damm (Czech Republic) D Vacek	6	6

Quarterfinals
(Brazil) G Kuerten (Brazil) J Oncins	3	2
(North Macedonia) A Kitinov (Philippines) E Taino	6	6
4	(South Africa) C Haggard (Spain) J Sánchez	5	3
(Spain) T Carbonell (Argentina) M Hood	7	6
WC	(Switzerland) R Federer (Switzerland) M Rosset	3	7	0
3	(United States) D Johnson (Czech Republic) C Suk	6	5	6
WC	(Argentina) L Lobo (Chile) M Ríos	3	7^{7}	6^{6}
2	(Czech Republic) M Damm (Czech Republic) D Vacek	6	6^{5}	7^{8}

Semifinals
(North Macedonia) A Kitinov (Philippines) E Taino	6	6
(Spain) T Carbonell (Argentina) M Hood	1	4
3	(United States) D Johnson (Czech Republic) C Suk	7^{7}	6
2	(Czech Republic) M Damm (Czech Republic) D Vacek	6^{3}	2

Final
(North Macedonia) A Kitinov (Philippines) E Taino	5	6^{4}
3	(United States) D Johnson (Czech Republic) C Suk	7	7^{7}
