= 1999 President's Cup – Doubles =

Doubles
- 1999 President's Cup

Final
- Champions: (Uzbekistan) Oleg Ogorodov (Switzerland) Marc Rosset
- Runners-up: (United States) Mark Keil (Switzerland) Lorenzo Manta
- Score: 7–6^{(7–4)}, 7–6^{(7–1)}

Details
- Draw: 16 (3WC/1Q)
- Seeds: 4

Events
| Singles | Doubles |
| ← 1998 · | President's Cup | · 2000 → |

The 1999 President's Cup was a men's tennis tournament played on Hard in Tashkent, Uzbekistan that was part of the International Series of the 1999 ATP Tour. It was the third edition of the tournament and was held from 13 – 18 September.

Oleg Ogorodov and Marc Rosset won the title by defeating Mark Keil and Lorenzo Manta 7–6^{(7–4)}, 7–6^{(7–1)} in the final.

== Seeds ==
Champion seeds are indicated in bold text while text in italics indicates the round in which those seeds were eliminated.

1. (South Africa) Chris Haggard / (Czech Republic) Daniel Vacek (first round)
2. (South Africa) Robbie Koenig / (Russia) Andrei Olhovskiy (quarterfinals)
3. (South Africa) Lan Bale / (South Africa) Piet Norval (first round)
4. (Sweden) Simon Aspelin / (Sweden) Johan Landsberg (first round)

== Draw ==
=== Key ===
- Q = Qualifier
- WC = Wild card
- LL = Lucky loser
- Alt = Alternate
- SE = Special exempt
- PR = Protected ranking
- ITF = ITF entry
- JE = Junior exempt
- w/o = Walkover
- r = Retired
- d = Defaulted
- SR = Special ranking

=== Finals ===
First round
(United States) **M Keil** **(Switzerland) L Manta** | 4 | **6** | **7**
1 | (South Africa) C Haggard (Czech Republic) D Vacek | **6** | 4 | 6
(Croatia) **I Ljubičić** **(Italy) L Tieleman** | **6** | **6**
Q | (Kazakhstan) A Kedryuk (Belarus) A Shvets | 3 | 4
(Russia) **M Safin** **(Belarus) V Voltchkov** | **6** | **6**
3 | (South Africa) L Bale (South Africa) P Norval | 4 | 4
(Armenia) **S Sargsian** **(United States) J Thomas** | **6** | **6**
(United Kingdom) B Cowan (Finland) T Ketola | 4 | 3
(Switzerland) **R Federer** **(Netherlands) S Groen** | 3 | **7** | **6**
(Netherlands) P Wessels (Socialist Federal Republic of Yugoslavia) N Zimonjić | **6** | 5 | 3
(Japan) **T Shimada** **(South Africa) M Wakefield** | 6 | **6** | **6**
4 | (Sweden) S Aspelin (Sweden) J Landsberg | **7** | 4 | 3
WC | (Uzbekistan) **O Ogorodov** **(Switzerland) M Rosset** | **6** | **6**
WC | (Uzbekistan) V Kutsenko (Uzbekistan) D Tomashevich | 4 | 2
2 | (South Africa) **R Koenig** **(Russia) A Olhovskiy** | **6** | **6**
WC | (Uzbekistan) T Ganiev (Thailand) P Srichaphan | 1 | 1

Quarterfinals
(United States) **M Keil** **(Switzerland) L Manta** | **7** | **6**
(Croatia) I Ljubičić (Italy) L Tieleman | 6 | 4
(Russia) M Safin (Belarus) V Voltchkov | **6** | 3 | 2
(Armenia) **S Sargsian** **(United States) J Thomas** | 4 | **6** | **6**
(Switzerland) R Federer (Netherlands) S Groen | 6 | 6
(Japan) **T Shimada** **(South Africa) M Wakefield** | **7** | **7**
WC | (Uzbekistan) **O Ogorodov** **(Switzerland) M Rosset** | 3 | **6** | **7**
2 | (South Africa) R Koenig (Russia) A Olhovskiy | **6** | 4 | 6

Semifinals
(United States) **M Keil** **(Switzerland) L Manta** | **7** | **7**
(Armenia) S Sargsian (United States) J Thomas | 6 | 6
(Japan) T Shimada (South Africa) M Wakefield | 5 | **7** | 4
WC | (Uzbekistan) **O Ogorodov** **(Switzerland) M Rosset** | **7** | 6 | **6**

Final
(United States) M Keil (Switzerland) L Manta | 6 | 6
WC | (Uzbekistan) **O Ogorodov** **(Switzerland) M Rosset** | **7** | **7**
