= 2001 UBS Open – Singles =

Singles
- 2001 UBS Open

Final
- Champion: (Czech Republic) Jiří Novák
- Runner-up: (Spain) Juan Carlos Ferrero
- Score: 6–1, 6–7^{(5–7)}, 7–5

Details
- Draw: 32
- Seeds: 8

Events
Singles	Doubles
- Swiss Open

Àlex Corretja was the defending champion but lost in the semifinals to Jiří Novák.

Novák won in the final 6–1, 6–7^{(5–7)}, 7–5 against Juan Carlos Ferrero.

== Seeds ==
A champion seed is indicated in bold text while text in italics indicates the round in which that seed was eliminated.

1. (Russia) Marat Safin (first round)
2. (Spain) Juan Carlos Ferrero (final)
3. (France) Sébastien Grosjean (semifinals)
4. (Spain) Àlex Corretja (semifinals)
5. (Switzerland) Roger Federer (first round)
6. (Argentina) Franco Squillari (quarterfinals)
7. (Argentina) Guillermo Coria (first round)
8. (Morocco) Hicham Arazi (first round)

== Draw ==
Key

- Q = Qualifier
- WC = Wild card
- LL = Lucky loser
- Alt = Alternate
- ITF = ITF entry
- PR = Protected ranking
- SR = Special ranking
- SE = Special exempt
- JE = Junior exempt
- JR = Junior Accelerator Programme entrant
- CO = College Accelerator Programme entrant
- NG = Next Gen Accelerator Program entrant
- w/o = Walkover
- r = Retired
- d = Defaulted

First round
1	(Russia) M Safin	4	**7^{7}**	4
(Spain) **J Balcells**	**6**	6^{4}	**6**
Q	(Spain) O Burrieza	4	**7^{7}**	1
(Switzerland) **M Kratochvil**	**6**	6^{3}	**6**
(Spain) **F Mantilla**	**6**	**7^{7}**
(Israel) H Levy	1	6^{2}
(Czech Republic) **J Novák**	**6**	**6**
7	(Argentina) G Coria	2	4
4	(Spain) **À Corretja**	**6**	**6**
WC	(Switzerland) I Heuberger	3	2
Q	(Austria) **W Eschauer**	**6**	**7^{7}**
(Spain) A Costa	0	6^{3}
(Argentina) **G Gaudio**	**6**	**6**
(Switzerland) M Rosset	4	3
(Croatia) **I Ljubičić**	**6**	**6**
5	(Switzerland) R Federer	2	1
6	(Argentina) **F Squillari**	**7**	**6**
WC	(Switzerland) G Bastl	5	4
(Spain) S Bruguera	**6**	2	4
(Spain) **A Martín**	1	**6**	**6**
Q	(Switzerland) L Manta	4	4
(Ecuador) **N Lapentti**	**6**	**6**
(Spain) Á Calatrava	5	2
3	(France) **S Grosjean**	**7**	**6**
8	(Morocco) H Arazi	1	6^{6}
(Spain) **F Clavet**	**6**	**7^{8}**
(Austria) S Koubek	2	**6**	3
(France) **C Pioline**	**6**	3	**6**
Q	(Croatia) M Radić	5	6^{1}
(France) **J Boutter**	**7**	**7^{7}**
WC	(France) A Di Pasquale	4	6^{3}
2	(Spain) **J C Ferrero**	**6**	**7^{7}**

Second round
(Spain) J Balcells	3	2
(Switzerland) **M Kratochvil**	**6**	**6**
(Spain) F Mantilla	3	2
(Czech Republic) **J Novák**	**6**	**6**
4	(Spain) **À Corretja**	**6**	**6**
Q	(Austria) W Eschauer	3	2
(Argentina) G Gaudio	6^{5}	**7^{7}**	1
(Croatia) **I Ljubičić**	**7^{7}**	6^{2}	**6**
6	(Argentina) **F Squillari**	4	**6**	**6**
(Spain) A Martín	**6**	4	2
(Ecuador) N Lapentti	**6**	4	6^{2}
3	(France) **S Grosjean**	4	**6**	**7^{7}**
(Spain) F Clavet	6^{5}	**7^{7}**	1
(France) **C Pioline**	**7^{7}**	6^{5}	**6**
(France) J Boutter	6^{2}	2
2	(Spain) **J C Ferrero**	**7^{7}**	**7**

Quarterfinals
(Switzerland) M Kratochvil	4	2
(Czech Republic) **J Novák**	**6**	**6**
4	(Spain) **À Corretja**	**6**	6^{4}	**6**
(Croatia) I Ljubičić	3	**7^{7}**	3
6	(Argentina) F Squillari	0	1
3	(France) **S Grosjean**	**6**	**6**
(France) C Pioline	2	1
2	(Spain) **J C Ferrero**	**6**	**6**

Semifinals
(Czech Republic) **J Novák**	3	**6**	**6**
4	(Spain) À Corretja	**6**	3	4
3	(France) S Grosjean	4	4
2	(Spain) **J C Ferrero**	**6**	**6**

Final
(Czech Republic) **Jiří Novák**	**6**	6^{5}	**7**
2	(Spain) Juan Carlos Ferrero	1	**7^{7}**	5
