= 1998 Rado Open – Doubles =

Doubles
- 1998 Rado Open

Final
- Champions: (Brazil) Gustavo Kuerten (Brazil) Fernando Meligeni
- Runners-up: (Argentina) Daniel Orsanic (Czech Republic) Cyril Suk
- Score: 6–4, 7–5

Details
- Draw: 16 (3WC/1Q/1LL)
- Seeds: 4

Events
Singles	Doubles
← 1997 ·	Swiss Open	· 1999 →

The 1998 Rado Open was a men's tennis tournament played on Clay in Gstaad, Switzerland that was part of the International Series of the 1998 ATP Tour. It was the thirty-first edition of the tournament and was held from 6 July – 12 July 1998.

== Seeds ==
Champion seeds are indicated in bold text while text in italics indicates the round in which those seeds were eliminated.

1. (United States) Donald Johnson / (United States) Francisco Montana (first round)
2. (Argentina) Daniel Orsanic / (Czech Republic) Cyril Suk (final)
3. (Spain) Tomás Carbonell / (Spain) Francisco Roig (semifinals)
4. (Argentina) Pablo Albano / (Ecuador) Nicolás Lapentti (quarterfinals)

== Draw ==
=== Key ===
- Q = Qualifier
- WC = Wild card
- LL = Lucky loser
- Alt = Alternate
- ITF = ITF entry
- PR = Protected ranking
- SR = Special ranking
- SE = Special exempt
- JE = Junior exempt
- JR = Junior Accelerator Programme entrant
- CO = College Accelerator Programme entrant
- NG = Next Gen Accelerator Program entrant
- w/o = Walkover
- r = Retired
- d = Defaulted

=== Finals ===
First round
(Brazil) **G Kuerten** **(Brazil) F Meligeni**	2	**6**	**7**
1	(United States) D Johnson (United States) F Montana	**6**	2	6
(South Africa) **M Barnard** **(North Macedonia) A Kitinov**	**6**	**6**
LL	(Switzerland) M Chiudinelli (Japan) J Kato	2	4
4	(Argentina) **P Albano** **(Ecuador) N Lapentti**	**6**	**6**
WC	(Switzerland) G Bastl (Switzerland) I Heuberger	2	2
Q	(Spain) **J Balcells** **(Spain) A Berasategui**	**7**	**7**
WC	(Spain) A Costa (Chile) M Ríos	6	6
WC	(Germany) **N Kiefer** **(France) C Pioline**	**6**	**6**
(South Africa) D Adams (Czech Republic) C Doseděl	3	2
3	(Spain) **T Carbonell** **(Spain) F Roig**	**6**	2	**7**
(Argentina) L Arnold (Argentina) M Hood	3	**6**	6
(Czechoslovakia) **L Pimek** **(Czech Republic) T Anzari**	6	**6**	**6**
(France) G Raoux (France) F Santoro	**7**	4	2
2	(Argentina) **D Orsanic** **(Czech Republic) C Suk**	**7**	3	**6**
(Spain) J Alonso (Spain) A Portas	6	**6**	1

Quarterfinals
(Brazil) **G Kuerten** **(Brazil) F Meligeni**	**7**	**7**
(South Africa) M Barnard (North Macedonia) A Kitinov	6	6
4	(Argentina) P Albano (Ecuador) N Lapentti	**6**	6	5
Q	(Spain) **J Balcells** **(Spain) A Berasategui**	3	**7**	**7**
WC	(Germany) N Kiefer (France) C Pioline	6^{r}
3	(Spain) **T Carbonell** **(Spain) F Roig**	**7**
(Czechoslovakia) L Pimek (Czech Republic) T Anzari	3	2
2	(Argentina) **D Orsanic** **(Czech Republic) C Suk**	**6**	**6**

Semifinals
(Brazil) **G Kuerten** **(Brazil) F Meligeni**	**6**	5	**7**
Q	(Spain) J Balcells (Spain) A Berasategui	2	**7**	6
3	(Spain) T Carbonell (Spain) F Roig	6	**7**	6
2	(Argentina) **D Orsanic** **(Czech Republic) C Suk**	**7**	6	**7**

Final
(Brazil) **G Kuerten** **(Brazil) F Meligeni**	**6**	**7**
2	(Argentina) D Orsanic (Czech Republic) C Suk	4	5

== Qualifying ==
=== Qualifying seeds ===
1. **(Spain) Joan Balcells / (Spain) Alberto Berasategui (qualified)**
2. (Italy) Giorgio Galimberti / (Italy) Massimo Valeri (qualifying competition)

=== Qualifiers ===
1. **(Spain) Joan Balcells / (Spain) Alberto Berasategui**

=== Lucky losers ===
1. **(Switzerland) Marco Chiudinelli / (Japan) Jun Kato**

=== Qualifying draw ===
First round				Qualifying competition
				1	**(Spain) Joan Balcells** **(Spain) Alberto Berasategui**	**7**	**6**
WC	(Switzerland) Marco Chiudinelli (Japan) Jun Kato	2	2	2	(Italy) Giorgio Galimberti (Italy) Massimo Valeri	5	4
2	**(Italy) Giorgio Galimberti** **(Italy) Massimo Valeri**	**6**	**6**
