= 2000 UBS Open Gstaad – Doubles =

Doubles
- 2000 UBS Open Gstaad

Final
- Champions: (Czech Republic) Jiří Novák (Czech Republic) David Rikl
- Runners-up: (France) Jérôme Golmard (Germany) Michael Kohlmann
- Score: 3–6, 6–3, 6–4

Events
Singles	Doubles
← 1999 ·	Swiss Open	· 2001 →

Donald Johnson and Cyril Suk were the defending champions, but competed this year with different partners. Johnson teamed up with Lucas Arnold Ker and lost in the first round to Nicolas Kiefer and Max Mirnyi, while Suk teamed up with Aleksandar Kitinov and also lost in first round to Roger Federer and Marc Rosset.

Jiří Novák and David Rikl won the title by defeating Jérôme Golmard and Michael Kohlmann 3–6, 6–3, 6–4 in the final.

== Seeds ==
1. (Czech Republic) Jiří Novák / (Czech Republic) David Rikl (champions)
2. (Argentina) Lucas Arnold Ker / (United States) Donald Johnson (first round)
3. (Spain) Tomás Carbonell / (Argentina) Martín García (semifinals)
4. (Spain) Juan Ignacio Carrasco / (Argentina) Daniel Orsanic (first round)

== Draw ==
=== Key ===
- Q = Qualifier
- WC = Wild card
- LL = Lucky loser
- Alt = Alternate
- ITF = ITF entry
- PR = Protected ranking
- SR = Special ranking
- SE = Special exempt
- JE = Junior exempt
- JR = Junior Accelerator Programme entrant
- CO = College Accelerator Programme entrant
- NG = Next Gen Accelerator Program entrant
- w/o = Walkover
- r = Retired
- d = Defaulted

=== Draw ===
First round
1	(Czech Republic) J Novák (Czech Republic) D Rikl	3	6	7
(Portugal) N Marques (Spain) J Velasco Jr.	6	3	5
(Switzerland) R Federer (Switzerland) M Rosset	6	6
(North Macedonia) A Kitinov (Czech Republic) C Suk	2	2
3	(Spain) T Carbonell (Argentina) M García	6	6
(Germany) MK Goellner (Philippines) E Taino	3	4
WC	(Switzerland) G Bastl (Switzerland) M Kratochvil	7^{7}	4	7
(Czech Republic) T Cibulec (Czech Republic) L Friedl	6^{4}	6	5
WC	(Argentina) M Puerta (Chile) M Ríos	5	2
(Czech Republic) P Pála (Czech Republic) P Vízner	7	6
(South Africa) C Haggard (Belgium) T Vanhoudt	6	6
4	(Spain) JI Carrasco (Argentina) D Orsanic	4	4
(United States) A Peterson (Australia) M Tebbutt	6^{2}	3
Q	(France) J Golmard (Germany) M Kohlmann	7^{7}	6
WC	(Germany) N Kiefer (Belarus) M Mirnyi	6	6
2	(Argentina) L Arnold Ker (United States) D Johnson	4	4

Quarterfinals
1	(Czech Republic) J Novák (Czech Republic) D Rikl	6	3	6
(Switzerland) R Federer (Switzerland) M Rosset	2	6	2
3	(Spain) T Carbonell (Argentina) M García	6	6
WC	(Switzerland) G Bastl (Switzerland) M Kratochvil	3	4
(Czech Republic) P Pála (Czech Republic) P Vízner	3	6	4
(South Africa) C Haggard (Belgium) T Vanhoudt	6	3	6
Q	(France) J Golmard (Germany) M Kohlmann	6	6
WC	(Germany) N Kiefer (Belarus) M Mirnyi	4	4

Semifinals
1	(Czech Republic) J Novák (Czech Republic) D Rikl	6	1	7
3	(Spain) T Carbonell (Argentina) M García	4	6	5
(South Africa) C Haggard (Belgium) T Vanhoudt	7	4	6^{7}
Q	(France) J Golmard (Germany) M Kohlmann	5	6	7^{9}

Final
1	(Czech Republic) J Novák (Czech Republic) D Rikl	3	6	6
Q	(France) J Golmard (Germany) M Kohlmann	6	3	4
