= 1999 President's Cup – Singles =

Singles
- 1999 President's Cup

Final
- Champion: (Germany) Nicolas Kiefer
- Runner-up: (Switzerland) George Bastl
- Score: 6–4, 6–2

Details
- Draw: 32 (3WC/4Q)
- Seeds: 8

Events
Singles	Doubles
- ATP Tashkent Open

The 1999 President's Cup was a men's tennis tournament played on hardcourt in Tashkent, Uzbekistan that was part of the International Series of the 1999 ATP Tour. It was the third edition of the tournament and was held from 13 – 18 September.

Tim Henman was the defending champion, but did not compete this year.

Nicolas Kiefer won the title by defeating qualifier George Bastl 6–4, 6–2 in the final.

Roger Federer entered ATP Top 100 for the first time after this tournament.

== Seeds ==
Champion seeds are indicated in bold text while text in italics indicates the round in which those seeds were eliminated.

1. (Russia) Yevgeny Kafelnikov (second round)
2. (United Kingdom) Greg Rusedski (first round)
3. (Germany) **Nicolas Kiefer (champion)**
4. (Slovakia) Karol Kučera (first round)
5. (France) Cédric Pioline (first round)
6. (Russia) Marat Safin (first round)
7. (Switzerland) Marc Rosset (second round)
8. (Slovakia) Ján Krošlák (first round, retired)

== Draw ==
Key

- Q = Qualifier
- WC = Wild card
- LL = Lucky loser
- Alt = Alternate
- ITF = ITF entry
- PR = Protected ranking
- SR = Special ranking
- SE = Special exempt
- JE = Junior exempt
- JR = Junior Accelerator Programme entrant
- CO = College Accelerator Programme entrant
- NG = Next Gen Accelerator Program entrant
- w/o = Walkover
- r = Retired
- d = Defaulted

=== Finals ===
Semifinals
(Czech Republic) Daniel Vacek	6^{4}	2
3	**(Germany) Nicolas Kiefer**	**7^{7}**	**6**
(Netherlands) Peter Wessels	4	3
Q	**(Switzerland) George Bastl**	**6**	**6**

Final
3	**(Germany) Nicolas Kiefer**	**6**	**6**
Q	(Switzerland) George Bastl	4	2

=== Top half ===
First round
1	**(Russia) Y Kafelnikov**	1	**6**	**6**
(Russia) A Cherkasov	**6**	3	3
**(Czech Republic) D Vacek**	**6**	3	**6**
WC	(Uzbekistan) V Kutsenko	3	**6**	1
Q	**(Thailand) P Srichaphan**	**7**	**6**
(Croatia) I Ljubičić	5	3
Q	**(Switzerland) I Heuberger**	**6**
8	(Slovakia) J Krošlák	2	R
3	**(Germany) N Kiefer**	4	**6**	**6**
(Finland) T Ketola	**6**	2	1
**(Switzerland) L Manta**	**7**	**6**
(Netherlands) J van Lottum	6	3
**(United States) C Mamiit**	**6**	**6**
Q	(Belarus) A Shvets	4	1
**(Finland) V Liukko**	4	**7**	3
6	(Russia) M Safin	**6**	5	1^{r}

Second round
1	(Russia) Y Kafelnikov	6	**6**	5
**(Czech Republic) D Vacek**	**7**	2	**7**
Q	**(Thailand) P Srichaphan**	**7**	**7**
Q	(Switzerland) I Heuberger	5	6
3	**(Germany) N Kiefer**	**6**	**6**
(Switzerland) L Manta	4	4
**(United States) C Mamiit**	**6**	**7**
(Finland) V Liukko	3	5

Quarterfinals
**(Czech Republic) D Vacek**	**7**	**7**
Q	(Thailand) P Srichaphan	5	6
3	**(Germany) N Kiefer**	**6**	**7**
(United States) C Mamiit	1	5

Semifinals
(Czech Republic) D Vacek	6	2
3	**(Germany) N Kiefer**	**7**	**6**

=== Bottom half ===
First round
**(Switzerland) R Federer**	**6**	**6**
5	(France) C Pioline	4	3
**(Netherlands) P Wessels**	3	**6**	**6**
(France) J Boutter	**6**	4	2
**(Germany) A Pretzsch**	3	**7**	**6**
(Italy) M Navarra	**6**	6	4
**(Armenia) S Sargsian**	**6**	**6**
4/WC	(Slovakia) K Kučera	1	4
7	**(Switzerland) M Rosset**	**6**	**6**
WC	(Uzbekistan) D Tomashevich	2	2
Q	**(Switzerland) G Bastl**	**7**	**6**
(Uzbekistan) O Ogorodov	6	2
**(France) A Dupuis**	**6**	**6**
(Belarus) V Voltchkov	2	4
**(Italy) L Tieleman**	**6**	**6**
2	(United Kingdom) G Rusedski	3	4

Second round
(Switzerland) R Federer	**6**	6	4
**(Netherlands) P Wessels**	4	**7**	**6**
**(Germany) A Pretzsch**	**6**	5	**7**
(Armenia) S Sargsian	3	**7**	5
7	(Switzerland) M Rosset	3	6
Q	**(Switzerland) G Bastl**	**6**	**7**
**(France) A Dupuis**	**6**	**6**
(Italy) L Tieleman	2	3

Quarterfinals
**(Netherlands) P Wessels**	**7**	**6**
(Germany) A Pretzsch	6	0
Q	**(Switzerland) G Bastl**	**6**	**6**
(France) A Dupuis	2	4

Semifinals
(Netherlands) P Wessels	4	3
Q	**(Switzerland) G Bastl**	**6**	**6**
