= 2000 UBS Open Gstaad – Singles =

Singles
- 2000 UBS Open Gstaad

Final
- Champion: (Spain) Àlex Corretja
- Runner-up: (Argentina) Mariano Puerta
- Score: 6–1, 6–3

Events
Singles	Doubles
- UBS Open Gstaad

Albert Costa was the defending champion, but lost in the semifinals to Mariano Puerta.

Àlex Corretja won the title, defeating Puerta in the final 6–1, 6–3.

== Seeds ==
A champion seed is indicated in bold while text in italics indicates the round in which that seed was eliminated.

1. (Spain) **Àlex Corretja (champion)**
2. (Germany) Nicolas Kiefer (second round)
3. (Spain) Juan Carlos Ferrero (first round)
4. (Spain) Albert Costa (semifinals)
5. (Morocco) Younes El Aynaoui (first round)
6. (Argentina) Franco Squillari (quarterfinals, retired due to illness)
7. (Chile) Marcelo Ríos (quarterfinals)
8. (Argentina) Mariano Puerta (final)

== Draw ==
Key

- Q = Qualifier
- WC = Wild card
- LL = Lucky loser
- Alt = Alternate
- ITF = ITF entry
- PR = Protected ranking
- SR = Special ranking
- SE = Special exempt
- JE = Junior exempt
- JR = Junior Accelerator Programme entrant
- CO = College Accelerator Programme entrant
- NG = Next Gen Accelerator Program entrant
- w/o = Walkover
- r = Retired
- d = Defaulted

=== Finals ===
Semifinals
1	**(Spain) Àlex Corretja**	**7**	**7**
(Argentina) Gastón Gaudio	5	5
4	(Spain) Albert Costa	4	3
8	**(Argentina) Mariano Puerta**	**6**	**6**

Final
1	**(Spain) Àlex Corretja**	**6**	**6**
8	(Argentina) Mariano Puerta	1	3

=== Top half ===
First round
1	**(Spain) À Corretja**	**6**	4	**6**
(Switzerland) R Federer	4	**6**	4
Q	(Spain) S Bruguera	**6**	5	2
**(United States) V Spadea**	2	**7**	**6**
**(Switzerland) G Bastl**	**6**	**6**
Q	(Argentina) L Arnold Ker	2	1
(Czech Republic) S Doseděl	5	**7^{7}**	2
7	**(Chile) M Ríos**	**7**	6^{2}	**6**
3	(Spain) JC Ferrero	4	6^{3}
**(Argentina) G Gaudio**	**6**	**7^{7}**
**(Belarus) M Mirnyi**	6^{3}	**7^{7}**	**6**
(Argentina) M Zabaleta	**7^{7}**	6^{3}	3
**(Switzerland) M Rosset**	**6**	**6**
WC	(Switzerland) M Kratochvil	3	2
(Germany) R Schüttler	5	5
6	**(Argentina) F Squillari**	**7**	**7**

Second round
1	**(Spain) À Corretja**	**6**	**6**
(United States) V Spadea	2	2
(Switzerland) G Bastl	3	5
7	**(Chile) M Ríos**	**6**	**7**
**(Argentina) G Gaudio**	**6**	4	**7**
(Belarus) M Mirnyi	2	**6**	5
(Switzerland) M Rosset	3	5
6	**(Argentina) F Squillari**	**6**	**7**

Quarterfinals
1	**(Spain) À Corretja**	6^{6}	**6**	**6**
7	(Chile) M Ríos	**7^{8}**	1	3
**(Argentina) G Gaudio**	**6**	4
6	(Argentina) F Squillari	1	1^{r}

Semifinals
1	**(Spain) À Corretja**	**7**	**7**
(Argentina) G Gaudio	5	5

=== Bottom half ===
First round
5	(Morocco) Y El Aynaoui	1	**6**	4
**(Spain) F Clavet**	**6**	4	**6**
(Morocco) H Arazi	3	6^{0}
**(Czech Republic) J Novák**	**6**	**7^{7}**
Q	(France) N Thomann	**6**	2	4
**(France) J Golmard**	4	**6**	**6**
(Austria) S Koubek	**6**	3	3
4	**(Spain) A Costa**	4	**6**	**6**
8	**(Argentina) M Puerta**	**6**	**6**
(France) A Di Pasquale	3	4
(Spain) F Vicente	1	4
**(Spain) F Mantilla**	**6**	**6**
**(France) S Grosjean**	**6**	**6**
WC	(Switzerland) I Heuberger	3	4
Q	(Spain) Á Calatrava	3	6^{2}
2	**(Germany) N Kiefer**	**6**	**7^{7}**

Second round
(Spain) F Clavet	3	5
**(Czech Republic) J Novák**	**6**	**7**
(France) J Golmard	4	3
4	**(Spain) A Costa**	**6**	**6**
8	**(Argentina) M Puerta**	**6**	**6**
(Spain) F Mantilla	0	2
**(France) S Grosjean**	**6**	**6**
2	(Germany) N Kiefer	3	1

Quarterfinals
(Czech Republic) J Novák	3	1
4	**(Spain) A Costa**	**6**	**6**
8	**(Argentina) M Puerta**	**7^{7}**	**6**
(France) S Grosjean	6^{4}	3

Semifinals
4	(Spain) A Costa	4	3
8	**(Argentina) M Puerta**	**6**	**6**
