= 1999 President's Cup (tennis) =

- Date: 13 – 18 September
- Edition: 3rd
- Category: ATP World Series
- Draw: 32S / 16D
- Prize money: $475,000
- Surface: Hard / outdoor
- Location: Tashkent, Uzbekistan

Champions

Singles
- (Germany) Nicolas Kiefer

Doubles
- (Uzbekistan) Oleg Ogorodov / (Switzerland) Marc Rosset
← 1998 ·	ATP Tashkent Open	· 2000 →

The 1999 President's Cup was a men's tennis tournament played on hard court in Tashkent, Uzbekistan. It was part of the International Series of the 1999 ATP Tour. It was the third edition of the tournament and was held from 13 September to 18 September 1999. Third-seeded Nicolas Kiefer won the singles title.

== Finals ==
=== Singles ===
(Germany) Nicolas Kiefer defeated (Switzerland) George Bastl, 6–4, 6–2.

=== Doubles ===
(Uzbekistan) Oleg Ogorodov / (Switzerland) Marc Rosset defeated (United States) Mark Keil / (Switzerland) Lorenzo Manta, 7–6, 7–6.

== See also ==
- 1999 Tashkent Open
