= 2001 UBS Open =

- Date: 9–15 July
- Edition: 56th
- Category: International Series
- Draw: 32S / 16D
- Prize money: $575,000
- Surface: Clay / outdoor
- Location: Gstaad, Switzerland
- Venue: Roy Emerson Arena

Champions

Singles
- (Czech Republic) Jiří Novák

Doubles
- (Switzerland) Roger Federer / (Russia) Marat Safin
- Swiss Open

The 2001 UBS Open was a men's tennis tournament played on outdoor clay courts at the Roy Emerson Arena in Gstaad in Switzerland and was part of the International Series of the 2001 ATP Tour. It was the 56th edition of the tournament and was held from 9 July until 15 July 2001. Unseeded Jiří Novák won the singles title.

== Finals ==
=== Singles ===
(Czech Republic) Jiří Novák defeated (Spain) Juan Carlos Ferrero 6–1, 6–7^{(5–7)}, 7–5

- It was Novák's 3rd title of the year and the 18th of his career.

=== Doubles ===
(Switzerland) Roger Federer / (Russia) Marat Safin defeated (Australia) Michael Hill / (United States) Jeff Tarango 0–1 (Hill and Tarango retired)

- It was Federer's 3rd title of the year and the 3rd of his career. It was Safin's 1st title of the year and the 9th of his career.
