= 1998 Rado Open – Singles =

Singles
- 1998 Rado Open

Final
- Champion: (Spain) Àlex Corretja
- Runner-up: (Germany) Boris Becker
- Score: 7–6^{(7–5)}, 7–5, 6–3

Details
- Draw: 32 (3WC/4Q/1LL)
- Seeds: 8

Events
Singles	Doubles
← 1997 ·	Swiss Open	· 1999 →

Àlex Corretja defeated Boris Becker in the final, 7–6^{(7–5)}, 7–5, 6–3 to win the singles tennis title at the 1998 Swiss Open.

Félix Mantilla was the defending champion, but lost in the quarterfinals to Becker.

This tournament marked the first professional appearance of future 20-time major champion and world No. 1 Roger Federer; he lost in the first round to lucky loser Lucas Arnold Ker.

== Seeds ==
Champion seeds are indicated in bold text while text in italics indicates the round in which those seeds were eliminated.

1. (Chile) Marcelo Ríos (semifinals)
2. (Russia) Yevgeny Kafelnikov (first round)
3. (Spain) **Àlex Corretja (champion)**
4. (France) Cédric Pioline (second round)
5. (Spain) Félix Mantilla (quarterfinals)
6. (Spain) Albert Costa (quarterfinals)
7. (Spain) Alberto Berasategui (first round)
8. (Germany) Nicolas Kiefer (quarterfinals)

== Draw ==
=== Key ===
- Q = Qualifier
- WC = Wild card
- LL = Lucky loser
- Alt = Alternate
- ITF = ITF entry
- PR = Protected ranking
- SR = Special ranking
- SE = Special exempt
- JE = Junior exempt
- JR = Junior Accelerator Programme entrant
- CO = College Accelerator Programme entrant
- NG = Next Gen Accelerator Program entrant
- w/o = Walkover
- r = Retired
- d = Defaulted

=== Finals ===
Semifinals
1	(Chile) Marcelo Ríos	4	6^{4}
**(Germany) Boris Becker**	**6**	**7**
3	**(Spain) Àlex Corretja**	**6**	6^{3}	**6**
(Belgium) Filip Dewulf	3	**7**	3

Final
(Germany) Boris Becker	6^{5}	5	3
3	**(Spain) Àlex Corretja**	**7**	**7**	**6**

=== Top half ===
First round
1	**(Chile) M Ríos**	**6**	**6**
(Switzerland) M Rosset	3	3
LL	**(Argentina) L Arnold Ker**	**6**	**6**
WC	(Switzerland) R Federer	4	4
**(Brazil) G Kuerten**	**6**	**6**
(France) G Raoux	4	4
**(Spain) F Clavet**	**6**	**6**
7	(Spain) A Berasategui	4	4
4	**(France) C Pioline**	**6**	**6**
(Ecuador) N Lapentti	4	4
**(Germany) B Becker**	**6**	6^{7}	**7**
WC	(Switzerland) G Bastl	4	**7**	5
**(France) F Santoro**	**7**	**6**
(Czech Republic) B Ulihrach	5	3
5	**(Spain) F Mantilla**	**6**	**6**
Q	(France) T Guardiola	2	2

Second round
1	**(Chile) M Ríos**	**6**	**6**
LL	(Argentina) L Arnold Ker	4	1
(Brazil) G Kuerten	**6**	4	4
**(Spain) F Clavet**	2	**6**	**6**
4	(France) C Pioline	6^{2}	5
**(Germany) B Becker**	**7**	**7**
(France) F Santoro	4	**6**	2
5	**(Spain) F Mantilla**	**6**	0	**6**

Quarterfinals
1	**(Chile) M Ríos**	**6**	**7**
(Spain) F Clavet	3	5
**(Germany) B Becker**	**6**	**6**
5	(Spain) F Mantilla	4	4

Semifinals
1	(Chile) M Ríos	4	6^{4}
**(Germany) B Becker**	**6**	**7**

=== Bottom half ===
First round
6	**(Spain) A Costa**	5	**6**	**6**
Q	(Argentina) D Orsanic	**7**	2	3
**(Spain) G Blanco**	**6**	**6**
Q	(Spain) T Carbonell	4	3
**(Czech Republic) C Doseděl**	**7**	**6**
WC	(Switzerland) I Heuberger	6^{4}	3
3	**(Spain) À Corretja**	**6**	4	**6**
Q	(Germany) O Gross	4	**6**	1
8	**(Germany) N Kiefer**	0	**7**	**7**
(Spain) JA Viloca	**6**	5	6^{8}
**(Spain) J Alonso**	**6**	**7**
(France) N Escudé	2	5
**(Belgium) F Dewulf**	3	**7**	**6**
(Spain) A Portas	**6**	6^{3}	2
**(Brazil) F Meligeni**	**6**	4	**6**
2	(Russia) Y Kafelnikov	3	**6**	3

Second round
6	**(Spain) A Costa**	**7**	**6**
(Spain) G Blanco	6^{3}	3
(Czech Republic) C Doseděl	0	5
3	**(Spain) À Corretja**	**6**	**7**
8	**(Germany) N Kiefer**	**6**	3	**6**
(Spain) J Alonso	3	**6**	1
**(Belgium) F Dewulf**	3	**7**	**6**
(Brazil) F Meligeni	**6**	5	3

Quarterfinals
6	(Spain) A Costa	**7**	2	2
3	**(Spain) À Corretja**	5	**6**	**6**
8	(Germany) N Kiefer	**6**	3	4
**(Belgium) F Dewulf**	1	**6**	**6**

Semifinals
3	**(Spain) À Corretja**	**6**	6^{3}	**6**
(Belgium) F Dewulf	3	**7**	3

== Qualifying ==
=== Qualifying seeds ===
1. (Argentina) Lucas Arnold Ker (qualifying competition, **Lucky loser**)
2. (Germany) **Oliver Gross (qualified)**
3. (Spain) Jacobo Díaz (first round)
4. (Hungary) Attila Sávolt (second round)
5. (Spain) Quino Muñoz (second round)
6. (Argentina) Agustín Garizzio (qualifying competition)
7. (Spain) **Tomás Carbonell (qualified)**
8. (Spain) Óscar Serrano (second round)

=== Qualifiers ===
1. (Spain) **Tomás Carbonell**
2. (Germany) **Oliver Gross**
3. (Argentina) **Daniel Orsanic**
4. (France) **Thierry Guardiola**

=== Lucky loser ===
1. (Argentina) **Lucas Arnold Ker** (replaced (Germany) Tommy Haas)

=== Qualifying draw ===
==== First qualifier ====
First round
1	**(Argentina) Lucas Arnold Ker**	**7**	**6**
(Spain) Joan Balcells	5	1
**(Spain) David Sánchez**	**6**	2	**6**
(Spain) Rubén Fernández-Gil	2	**6**	2
**(Italy) Massimo Valeri**	**6**	**6**
(Italy) Gabrio Castrichella	4	1
(Italy) Fabio Maggi	2	0
7	**(Spain) Tomás Carbonell**	**6**	**6**

Second round
1	**(Argentina) Lucas Arnold Ker**	4	**6**	**6**
(Spain) David Sánchez	**6**	3	4
(Italy) Massimo Valeri	6	4
7	**(Spain) Tomás Carbonell**	**7**	**6**

Qualifying competition
1	(Argentina) Lucas Arnold Ker	2	1
7	**(Spain) Tomás Carbonell**	**6**	**6**

==== Second qualifier ====
First round
2	**(Germany) Oliver Gross**	**6**	**6**
WC	(Switzerland) Stéphane Bohli	2	2
**(Switzerland) Sandro Della Piana**	1	**7**	**7**
WC	(Switzerland) Marco Chiudinelli	**6**	6	5
**(Haiti) Bertrand Madsen**	**7**	**6**
(Switzerland) Alexandre Strambini	6	4
(Italy) Giorgio Galimberti	2	2
8	**(Spain) Óscar Serrano**	**6**	**6**

Second round
2	**(Germany) Oliver Gross**	**6**	**6**
(Switzerland) Sandro Della Piana	4	1
**(Haiti) Bertrand Madsen**	**6**	3	**6**
8	(Spain) Óscar Serrano	3	**6**	3

Qualifying competition
2	**(Germany) Oliver Gross**	**6**	**6**
(Haiti) Bertrand Madsen	4	4

==== Third qualifier ====
First round
3	(Spain) Jacobo Díaz	4	**6**	1
**(Ecuador) Luis Morejón**	**6**	0	**6**
(Switzerland) Michel Kratochvil	6	**7**	1
**(France) Frédéric Fontang**	**7**	6	**6**
(France) Gregory Zavialoff	4	2
**(Argentina) Daniel Orsanic**	**6**	**6**
(Ukraine) Andrei Rybalko	3	**6**	2
5	**(Spain) Quino Muñoz**	**6**	4	**6**

Second round
**(Ecuador) Luis Morejón**	**6**	3
(France) Frédéric Fontang	1	2^{r}
**(Argentina) Daniel Orsanic**	**6**	**6**
5	(Spain) Quino Muñoz	2	4

Qualifying competition
(Ecuador) Luis Morejón	4	1
**(Argentina) Daniel Orsanic**	**6**	**6**

==== Fourth qualifier ====
First round
4	**(Hungary) Attila Sávolt**	**6**	**6**
(Greece) Niko Karagiannis	4	4
WC	(Japan) Jun Kato	3	6
**(France) Thierry Guardiola**	**6**	**7**
**(Argentina) Mariano Hood**	4	**6**	**6**
WC	(United States) Francisco Montana	**6**	2	4
(Russia) Andrei Merinov	2	3
6	**(Argentina) Agustín Garizzio**	**6**	**6**

Second round
4	(Hungary) Attila Sávolt	3	4
**(France) Thierry Guardiola**	**6**	**6**
(Argentina) Mariano Hood	**6**	3	6^{r}
6	**(Argentina) Agustín Garizzio**	3	**6**	5

Qualifying competition
**(France) Thierry Guardiola**	**7**	0	**6**
6	(Argentina) Agustín Garizzio	6	**6**	4
