= 2000 UBS Open Gstaad =

- Date: 10–17 July
- Edition: 55th
- Category: International Series
- Draw: 32S / 16D
- Prize money: $600,000
- Surface: Clay / outdoor
- Location: Gstaad, Switzerland
- Venue: Roy Emerson Arena

Champions

Singles
- (Spain) Àlex Corretja

Doubles
- (Czech Republic) Jiří Novák / (Czech Republic) David Rikl
- Swiss Open

The 2000 UBS Open Gstaad was a men's tennis tournament played on outdoor clay courts at the Roy Emerson Arena in Gstaad in Switzerland and was part of the International Series of the 2000 ATP Tour. It was the 55th edition of the tournament and ran from 10 July until 17 July 2000. First-seeded Àlex Corretja won the singles title.

== Finals ==
=== Singles ===
(Spain) Àlex Corretja defeated (Argentina) Mariano Puerta 6–1, 6–3

- It was Corretja's 2nd singles title of the year and the 11th of his career.

=== Doubles ===
(Czech Republic) Jiří Novák / (Czech Republic) David Rikl defeated (France) Jérôme Golmard / (Germany) Michael Kohlmann 3–6, 6–3, 6–4

- It was Novák's 2nd title of the year and the 11th of his career. It was Rikl's 2nd title of the year and the 17th of his career.
