= 1999 Rado Swiss Open Gstaad =

- Date: 5–11 July
- Edition: 54th
- Category: World Series
- Draw: 32S / 16D
- Prize money: $525,000
- Surface: Clay / outdoor
- Location: Gstaad, Switzerland
- Venue: Roy Emerson Arena

Champions

Singles
- (Spain) Albert Costa

Doubles
- (United States) Donald Johnson / (Czech Republic) Cyril Suk
- Swiss Open

The 1999 Rado Swiss Open Gstaad was a men's tennis tournament played on outdoor clay courts at the Roy Emerson Arena in Gstaad, Switzerland and was part of the World Series of the 1999 ATP Tour. It was the 54th edition of the tournament and took place from 5 July until 11 July 1999. Eighth-seeded Albert Costa won the singles title.

== Finals ==
=== Singles ===
(Spain) Albert Costa defeated (Ecuador) Nicolás Lapentti 7–6^{(7–4)}, 6–3, 6–4

- It was Costa's 2nd singles title of the year and the 10th of his career.

=== Doubles ===
(United States) Donald Johnson / (Czech Republic) Cyril Suk defeated (North Macedonia) Aleksandar Kitinov / (Philippines) Eric Taino 7–5, 7–6^{(7–4)}
