= 1998 Rado Open =

- Date: 6–12 July
- Edition: 31st
- Category: International Series
- Draw: 32S / 16D
- Prize money: $525,000
- Surface: Clay / outdoor
- Location: Gstaad, Switzerland
- Venue: Roy Emerson Arena

Champions

Singles
- (Spain) Àlex Corretja

Doubles
- (Brazil) Gustavo Kuerten / (Brazil) Fernando Meligeni
- Swiss Open

The 1998 Rado Open was a men's tennis tournament played on outdoor clay courts at the Roy Emerson Arena in Gstaad, Switzerland that was part of the International Series category of the 1998 ATP Tour. It was the thirty-first edition of the tournament and was held from 6 July until 12 July 1998. Third-seeded Àlex Corretja won the singles title.

This tournament was also notable for the ATP debut of future world No. 1, Roger Federer. The 16-year old, who had just come of a title at the Wimbledon Boys' singles, entered the main draw on a wildcard, but was knocked out in the first round.

== Finals ==
=== Singles ===
(Spain) Àlex Corretja defeated (Germany) Boris Becker, 7–6^{(7–5)}, 7–5, 6–3

=== Doubles ===
(Brazil) Gustavo Kuerten / (Brazil) Fernando Meligeni defeated (Argentina) Daniel Orsanic / (Czech Republic) Cyril Suk, 6–4, 7–5
