= 2001 UBS Open – Doubles =

Doubles
- 2001 UBS Open

Final
- Champions: (Switzerland) Roger Federer (Russia) Marat Safin
- Runners-up: (Australia) Michael Hill (United States) Jeff Tarango
- Score: 0–1 ret.

Details
- Draw: 16
- Seeds: 4

Events
Singles	Doubles
- Swiss Open

Jiří Novák and David Rikl were the defending champions but lost in the quarterfinals to Tomás Carbonell and Nicolás Lapentti.

Roger Federer and Marat Safin won the final 0–1 after Michael Hill and Jeff Tarango were forced to retire.

== Seeds ==
Champion seeds are indicated in bold text while text in italics indicates the round in which those seeds were eliminated.

1. (Czech Republic) Jiří Novák / (Czech Republic) David Rikl (quarterfinals)
2. (Czech Republic) Petr Pála / (Czech Republic) Pavel Vízner (quarterfinals)
3. (Australia) Michael Hill / (United States) Jeff Tarango (final)
4. (Argentina) Pablo Albano / (Argentina) Lucas Arnold (first round)

== Draw ==
Key

- Q = Qualifier
- WC = Wild card
- LL = Lucky loser
- Alt = Alternate
- ITF = ITF entry
- PR = Protected ranking
- SR = Special ranking
- SE = Special exempt
- JE = Junior exempt
- JR = Junior Accelerator Programme entrant
- CO = College Accelerator Programme entrant
- NG = Next Gen Accelerator Program entrant
- w/o = Walkover
- r = Retired
- d = Defaulted

First round
1	(Czech Republic) **J Novák** (Czech Republic) **D Rikl**	**7^{7}**	**6**
WC	(Argentina) L Lobo (Switzerland) M Rosset	6^{1}	2
(France) J Boutter (Switzerland) L Manta	5	**6**	2
(Spain) **T Carbonell** (Ecuador) **N Lapentti**	**7**	4	**6**
3	(Australia) **M Hill** (United States) **J Tarango**	5	**7**	**6**
(Australia) P Hanley (South Africa) J Weir-Smith	**7**	5	4
(Brazil) J Oncins (Argentina) D Orsanic	3	**7**	4
WC	(Switzerland) **I Heuberger** (France) **C Pioline**	**6**	5	**6**
WC	(Argentina) G Coria (Spain) J C Ferrero	6^{5}	4
(Czech Republic) **T Cibulec** (Czech Republic) **L Friedl**	**7^{7}**	**6**
(Switzerland) **R Federer** (Russia) **M Safin**	**6**	**6**
4	(Argentina) P Albano (Argentina) L Arnold	3	4
WC	(Switzerland) G Bastl (Switzerland) M Kratochvil	1	**7^{7}**	1
(South Africa) **M Barnard** (Czech Republic) **C Suk**	**6**	6^{3}	**6**
(South Africa) C Haggard (Belgium) T Vanhoudt	**7^{7}**	1	2
2	(Czech Republic) **P Pála** (Czech Republic) **P Vízner**	6^{3}	**6**	**6**

Quarterfinals
1	(Czech Republic) J Novák (Czech Republic) D Rikl	3	4
(Spain) **T Carbonell** (Ecuador) **N Lapentti**	**6**	**6**
3	(Australia) **M Hill** (United States) **J Tarango**	**6**	**6**
WC	(Switzerland) I Heuberger (France) C Pioline	0	2
(Czech Republic) T Cibulec (Czech Republic) L Friedl	**7^{9}**	4	4
(Switzerland) **R Federer** (Russia) **M Safin**	6^{7}	**6**	**6**
(South Africa) **M Barnard** (Czech Republic) **C Suk**	**6**	**6**
2	(Czech Republic) P Pála (Czech Republic) P Vízner	2	3

Semifinals
(Spain) T Carbonell (Ecuador) N Lapentti	**6**	3	4
3	(Australia) **M Hill** (United States) **J Tarango**	3	**6**	**6**
(Switzerland) **R Federer** (Russia) **M Safin**	**7^{7}**	**7^{7}**
(South Africa) M Barnard (Czech Republic) C Suk	6^{3}	6^{5}

Final
3	(Australia) M Hill (United States) J Tarango	1^{r}
(Switzerland) **R Federer** (Russia) **M Safin**	0
