= 2003 Breil Milano Indoor – Doubles =

Doubles
- 2003 Breil Milano Indoor

Final
- Champions: (Czech Republic) Petr Luxa (Czech Republic) Radek Štěpánek
- Runners-up: (Czech Republic) Tomáš Cibulec (Czech Republic) Pavel Vízner
- Score: 6–4, 7–6^{(7–4)}

Events
Singles	Doubles
← 2002 ·	Milan Indoor	· 2004 →

Karsten Braasch and Andrei Olhovskiy were the defending champions but did not compete that year.

Petr Luxa and Radek Štěpánek won in the final 6–4, 7–6^{(7–4)} against Tomáš Cibulec and Pavel Vízner.

== Seeds ==
1. (Sweden) Jonas Björkman / (Russia) Yevgeny Kafelnikov (first round)
2. (Czech Republic) Petr Pála / (Czech Republic) Cyril Suk (quarterfinals)
3. (Czech Republic) Tomáš Cibulec / (Czech Republic) Pavel Vízner (final)
4. (South Africa) David Adams / (Australia) Paul Hanley (first round)

== Draw ==
=== Key ===
- Q = Qualifier
- WC = Wild card
- LL = Lucky loser
- Alt = Alternate
- SE = Special exempt
- PR = Protected ranking
- ITF = ITF entry
- JE = Junior exempt
- w/o = Walkover
- r = Retired
- d = Defaulted
- SR = Special ranking

First round
1	(Sweden) J Björkman (Russia) Y Kafelnikov	0	2
(Sweden) S Aspelin (Slovakia) D Hrbatý	6	6
(Netherlands) R Krajicek (Netherlands) M Verkerk	6	6
WC	(Italy) R Furlan (Italy) A Gaudenzi	1	3
3	(Czech Republic) T Cibulec (Czech Republic) P Vízner	7^{10}	6
WC	(Israel) A Hadad (Pakistan) A-u-H Qureshi	6^{8}	1
(Argentina) G Etlis (Argentina) M Rodríguez	7	3	5
(Netherlands) P Haarhuis (Netherlands) S Schalken	5	6	7
(Morocco) Y El Aynaoui (United States) J Tarango	7^{7}	3	7^{7}
(Czech Republic) L Friedl (Brazil) A Sá	6^{5}	6	6^{1}
(Spain) F López (Italy) D Sanguinetti	6	6
4	(South Africa) D Adams (Australia) P Hanley	4	4
(France) N Escudé (Federal Republic of Yugoslavia) N Zimonjić	4	6^{4}
(Czech Republic) P Luxa (Czech Republic) R Štěpánek	6	7^{7}
(Sweden) J Landsberg (Finland) J Nieminen	6	4	2
2	(Czech Republic) P Pála (Czech Republic) C Suk	4	6	6

Quarterfinals
(Sweden) S Aspelin (Slovakia) D Hrbatý	w/o
(Netherlands) R Krajicek (Netherlands) M Verkerk
3	(Czech Republic) T Cibulec (Czech Republic) P Vízner	7^{7}	3	6
(Netherlands) P Haarhuis (Netherlands) S Schalken	6^{3}	6	2
(Morocco) Y El Aynaoui (United States) J Tarango	6^{8}	7^{7}	1
(Spain) F López (Italy) D Sanguinetti	7^{10}	6^{2}	6
(Czech Republic) P Luxa (Czech Republic) R Štěpánek	6	3	6
2	(Czech Republic) P Pála (Czech Republic) C Suk	4	6	3

Semifinals
(Sweden) S Aspelin (Slovakia) D Hrbatý	3	3
3	(Czech Republic) T Cibulec (Czech Republic) P Vízner	6	6
(Spain) F López (Italy) D Sanguinetti	6	4	4
(Czech Republic) P Luxa (Czech Republic) R Štěpánek	2	6	6

Final
3	(Czech Republic) T Cibulec (Czech Republic) P Vízner	4	6^{4}
(Czech Republic) P Luxa (Czech Republic) R Štěpánek	6	7^{7}
