= 2002 Milan Indoor – Singles =

Tennis tournament

Singles
- 2002 Milan Indoor

Final
- Champion: (Italy) Davide Sanguinetti
- Runner-up: (Switzerland) Roger Federer
- Score: 7–6^{(7–2)}, 4–6, 6–1

Details
- Draw: 32 (4Q / 3WC)
- Seeds: 8

Events
| Singles | Doubles |
| ← 2001 · | Milan Indoor | · 2003 → |

Roger Federer was the defending champion but lost in the final 7–6^{(7–2)}, 4–6, 6–1 against Davide Sanguinetti.

== Seeds ==
A champion seed is indicated in bold text while text in italics indicates the round in which that seed was eliminated.

1. (Spain) Juan Carlos Ferrero (second round)
2. (Switzerland) Roger Federer (final)
3. (Croatia) Goran Ivanišević (first round)
4. (United States) Jan-Michael Gambill (first round)
5. (Morocco) Younes El Aynaoui (quarterfinals)
6. (Czech Republic) Jiří Novák (first round)
7. (United Kingdom) Greg Rusedski (semifinals)
8. (Morocco) Hicham Arazi (second round)

== Draw ==
=== Key ===
- Q = Qualifier
- WC = Wild card
- LL = Lucky loser
- Alt = Alternate
- SE = Special exempt
- PR = Protected ranking
- ITF = ITF entry
- JE = Junior exempt
- w/o = Walkover
- r = Retired
- d = Defaulted
- SR = Special ranking

First round
WC/1 | (Spain) **J C Ferrero** | 3 | **7^{7}** | **6**
(France) J Boutter | **6** | 6^{5} | 4
Q | (Germany) C Vinck | 5 | **6** | 5
(Italy) **D Sanguinetti** | **7** | 3 | **7**
WC | (Italy) **S Galvani** | 3 | **6** | **6**
Q | (France) N Thomann | **6** | 4 | 2
(Denmark) K Pless | **6** | 3 | 6^{7}
5 | (Morocco) **Y El Aynaoui** | 4 | **6** | **7^{9}**
3 | (Croatia) G Ivanišević | **7** | 6^{7} | 0^{r}
(Czech Republic) **M Tabara** | 5 | **7^{9}** | 3
WC | (Italy) F Luzzi | 0 | 1^{r}
Q | (Belarus) **M Mirnyi** | **6** | 4
(France) **N Escudé** | 4 | **6** | **6**
(Belgium) C Rochus | **6** | 3 | 4
(Russia) M Youzhny | 6^{1} | **6** | 3
8 | (Morocco) **H Arazi** | **7^{7}** | 2 | **6**
7 | (United Kingdom) **G Rusedski** | **7** | **6**
(Spain) F Clavet | 5 | 3
(Czech Republic) **B Ulihrach** | **6** | 3 | **6**
(Finland) J Nieminen | 2 | **6** | 3
Q | (Italy) C Caratti | **6** | 3 | 4
(Brazil) **A Sá** | 3 | **6** | **6**
(Netherlands) **S Schalken** | **7** | 3 | **6**
4 | (United States) J-M Gambill | 5 | **6** | 3
6 | (Czech Republic) J Novák | 3 | **6** | 4
(Armenia) **S Sargsian** | **6** | 2 | **6**
(Italy) A Gaudenzi | 2 | 2
(Switzerland) **M Kratochvil** | **6** | **6**
(Brazil) F Meligeni | **6** | 2 | 3
(Russia) **N Davydenko** | 4 | **6** | **6**
(Austria) S Koubek | 6^{2} | 3
2 | (Switzerland) **R Federer** | **7^{7}** | **6**

Second round
WC/1 | (Spain) J C Ferrero | **6** | 6^{0} | 4
(Italy) **D Sanguinetti** | 3 | **7^{7}** | **6**
WC | (Italy) S Galvani | 4 | 3
5 | (Morocco) **Y El Aynaoui** | **6** | **6**
(Czech Republic) M Tabara | 1 | 2
Q | (Belarus) **M Mirnyi** | **6** | **6**
(France) **N Escudé** | **6** | **6**
8 | (Morocco) H Arazi | 1 | 3
7 | (United Kingdom) **G Rusedski** | **7^{7}** | **6**
(Czech Republic) B Ulihrach | 6^{5} | 4
(Brazil) A Sá | 3 | 0
(Netherlands) **S Schalken** | **6** | **6**
(Armenia) **S Sargsian** | **6** | **6**
(Switzerland) M Kratochvil | 4 | 4
(Russia) N Davydenko | 3 | **7^{7}** | 5
2 | (Switzerland) **R Federer** | **6** | 6^{4} | **7**

Quarterfinals
(Italy) **D Sanguinetti** | **7^{7}** | **7^{7}**
5 | (Morocco) Y El Aynaoui | 6^{4} | 6^{2}
Q | (Belarus) M Mirnyi | 6^{6} | 3
(France) **N Escudé** | **7^{8}** | **6**
7 | (United Kingdom) **G Rusedski** | 4 | **7^{7}** | **6**
(Netherlands) S Schalken | **6** | 6^{5} | 2
(Armenia) S Sargsian | **6** | 3 | 3
2 | (Switzerland) **R Federer** | 4 | **6** | **6**

Semifinals
(Italy) **D Sanguinetti** | 3 | **6** | **6**
(France) N Escudé | **6** | 3 | 2
7 | (United Kingdom) G Rusedski | 6^{7} | 6^{4}
2 | (Switzerland) **R Federer** | **7^{9}** | **7^{7}**

Final
(Italy) **Davide Sanguinetti** | **7^{7}** | 4 | **6**
2 | (Switzerland) Roger Federer | 6^{2} | **6** | 1
