= 2004 Indesit ATP Milan Indoor – Doubles =

Doubles
- 2004 Indesit ATP Milan Indoor

Final
- Champions: (United States) Jared Palmer (Czech Republic) Pavel Vízner
- Runners-up: (Italy) Daniele Bracciali (Italy) Giorgio Galimberti
- Score: 6–4, 6–4

Events
Singles	Doubles
← 2003 ·	Milan Indoor	· 2005 →

Petr Luxa and Radek Štěpánek were the defending champions but only Štěpánek competed that year with Martin Damm.

Damm and Štěpánek lost in the semifinals to Jared Palmer and Pavel Vízner.

Palmer and Vízner won in the final 6–4, 6–4 against Daniele Bracciali and Giorgio Galimberti.

== Seeds ==
1. (Australia) Paul Hanley / (South Africa) Robbie Koenig (first round)
2. (United States) Jared Palmer / (Czech Republic) Pavel Vízner (champions)
3. (Israel) Jonathan Erlich / (Israel) Andy Ram (semifinals)
4. (Armenia) Sargis Sargsian / (Serbia and Montenegro) Nenad Zimonjić (first round)

== Draw ==
Key

- Q = Qualifier
- WC = Wild card
- LL = Lucky loser
- Alt = Alternate
- ITF = ITF entry
- PR = Protected ranking
- SR = Special ranking
- SE = Special exempt
- JE = Junior exempt
- JR = Junior Accelerator Programme entrant
- CO = College Accelerator Programme entrant
- NG = Next Gen Accelerator Program entrant
- w/o = Walkover
- r = Retired
- d = Defaulted

First round
1	(Australia) P Hanley (South Africa) R Koenig	6^{8}	3
WC	(Italy) D Bracciali (Italy) G Galimberti	7^{10}	6
WC	(Croatia) G Ivanišević (Italy) A Seppi	2	7^{7}	6
(Netherlands) R Sluiter (Netherlands) M Verkerk	6	6^{4}	4
3	(Israel) J Erlich (Israel) A Ram	7^{8}	6
(Slovakia) D Hrbatý (Italy) D Sanguinetti	6^{6}	0
(Czech Republic) T Cibulec (Czech Republic) D Škoch	6	6^{4}	3
(Germany) M Kohlmann (Czech Republic) P Pála	3	7^{7}	6
(Czech Republic) M Damm (Czech Republic) R Štěpánek	6	4	7^{8}
(Croatia) M Ančić (Spain) F López	3	6	6^{6}
(Sweden) T Johansson (Sweden) J Landsberg	7^{9}	3	6
4	(Armenia) S Sargsian (Serbia and Montenegro) N Zimonjić	6^{7}	6	3
(Russia) A Olhovskiy (Russia) M Youzhny	1	6^{9}
(Sweden) S Aspelin (Italy) M Bertolini	6	7^{11}
(France) G Carraz (Spain) A Martín	5	6	2
2	(United States) J Palmer (Czech Republic) P Vízner	7	4	6

Quarterfinals
WC	(Italy) D Bracciali (Italy) G Galimberti	6	6
WC	(Croatia) G Ivanišević (Italy) A Seppi	3	4
3	(Israel) J Erlich (Israel) A Ram	6	6
(Germany) M Kohlmann (Czech Republic) P Pála	1	2
(Czech Republic) M Damm (Czech Republic) R Štěpánek	6	6
(Sweden) T Johansson (Sweden) J Landsberg	4	2
(Sweden) S Aspelin (Italy) M Bertolini	6	6^{5}	2
2	(United States) J Palmer (Czech Republic) P Vízner	2	7^{7}	6

Semifinals
WC	(Italy) D Bracciali (Italy) G Galimberti	7^{7}	7^{7}
3	(Israel) J Erlich (Israel) A Ram	6^{4}	6^{5}
(Czech Republic) M Damm (Czech Republic) R Štěpánek	3	6^{5}
2	(United States) J Palmer (Czech Republic) P Vízner	6	7^{7}

Final
WC	(Italy) D Bracciali (Italy) G Galimberti	4	4
2	(United States) J Palmer (Czech Republic) P Vízner	6	6
