= 2000 Axa Cup – Singles =

Singles
- 2000 AXA Cup

Final
- Champion: (Switzerland) Marc Rosset
- Runner-up: (Russia) Yevgeny Kafelnikov
- Score: 6–4, 6–4

Details
- Draw: 32 (4Q / 2WC)
- Seeds: 8

Events
Singles	Doubles
← 1999 ·	Milan Indoor	· 2001 →

Richard Krajicek was the defending champion but did not participate.

Marc Rosset won the title, defeating Yevgeny Kafelnikov 6–4, 6–4 in the final.

== Seeds ==
1. (Russia) Yevgeny Kafelnikov (final)
2. (Germany) Nicolas Kiefer (first round)
3. (United Kingdom) Tim Henman (first round)
4. (Sweden) Thomas Enqvist (semifinals)
5. (United Kingdom) Greg Rusedski (semifinals)
6. (France) Cédric Pioline (quarterfinals)
7. (Slovakia) Dominik Hrbatý (second round)
8. (Morocco) Hicham Arazi (second round)

== Draw ==
Key

- Q = Qualifier
- WC = Wild card
- LL = Lucky loser
- Alt = Alternate
- ITF = ITF entry
- PR = Protected ranking
- SR = Special ranking
- SE = Special exempt
- JE = Junior exempt
- JR = Junior Accelerator Programme entrant
- CO = College Accelerator Programme entrant
- NG = Next Gen Accelerator Program entrant
- w/o = Walkover
- r = Retired
- d = Defaulted

=== Finals ===
Semifinals
1	(Russia) Yevgeny Kafelnikov	6	7^{7}
5	(United Kingdom) Greg Rusedski	3	6^{4}
4	(Sweden) Thomas Enqvist	5	6	3
(Switzerland) Marc Rosset	7	1	6

Final
1	(Russia) Yevgeny Kafelnikov	4	4
(Switzerland) Marc Rosset	6	6

=== Top half ===
First round
1	(Russia) Y Kafelnikov	6	6
(Ukraine) A Medvedev	3	4
(Sweden) T Johansson	3	2
(Czech Republic) D Vacek	6	6
(France) F Santoro	4	6	6
(Russia) M Safin	6	2	4
(United States) J-M Gambill	4	5
8	(Morocco) H Arazi	6	7
3	(United Kingdom) T Henman	6^{3}	5
(Argentina) M Zabaleta	7^{7}	7
(Germany) R Schüttler	4	4
Q	(France) C Saulnier	6	6
(France) J Golmard	6	6
(Spain) JC Ferrero	2	2
(France) A Clément	3	4
5	(United Kingdom) G Rusedski	6	6

Second round
1	(Russia) Y Kafelnikov	6	7
(Czech Republic) D Vacek	2	5
(France) F Santoro	6	6
8	(Morocco) H Arazi	4	2
(Argentina) M Zabaleta	6	6
Q	(France) C Saulnier	4	1
(France) J Golmard	6^{5}	6^{4}
5	(United Kingdom) G Rusedski	7^{7}	7^{7}

Quarterfinals
1	(Russia) Y Kafelnikov	6	6
(France) F Santoro	3	2
(Argentina) M Zabaleta	4	5
5	(United Kingdom) G Rusedski	6	7

Semifinals
1	(Russia) Y Kafelnikov	6	7^{7}
5	(United Kingdom) G Rusedski	3	6^{4}

=== Bottom half ===
First round
6	(France) C Pioline	7	7^{7}
(Spain) A Martín	5	6^{5}
LL	(United States) J Tarango	7	6
Q	(Sweden) J Björkman	5	4
(Czech Republic) J Novák	5	3
(Slovakia) K Kučera	7	6
Q	(Romania) A Voinea	1	4
4	(Sweden) T Enqvist	6	6
7	(Slovakia) D Hrbatý	6	6
(Romania) A Pavel	4	3
WC	(Croatia) I Ljubičić	4	4
(Switzerland) M Rosset	6	6
Q	(Zimbabwe) W Black	5	2
WC	(Croatia) G Ivanišević	7	6
(Switzerland) R Federer	6	6
2	(Germany) N Kiefer	2	3

Second round
6	(France) C Pioline	6	6
LL	(United States) J Tarango	3	4
(Slovakia) K Kučera	3	6	4
4	(Sweden) T Enqvist	6	3	6
7	(Slovakia) D Hrbatý	3	6^{8}
(Switzerland) M Rosset	6	7^{10}
WC	(Croatia) G Ivanišević	5	3
(Switzerland) R Federer	7	6

Quarterfinals
6	(France) C Pioline	6^{3}	6	6^{6}
4	(Sweden) T Enqvist	7^{7}	4	7^{8}
(Switzerland) M Rosset	3	6	6
(Switzerland) R Federer	6	4	4

Semifinals
4	(Sweden) T Enqvist	5	6	3
(Switzerland) M Rosset	7	1	6
