= 1997 Italian Indoor – Singles =

Singles
- 1997 Italian Indoor

Final
- Champion: (Croatia) Goran Ivanišević
- Runner-up: (Spain) Sergi Bruguera
- Score: 6–2, 6–2

Details
- Draw: 32
- Seeds: 8

Events
Singles	Doubles
← 1996 ·	Italian Indoor	· 1998 →

Goran Ivanišević was the defending champion and won in the final 6–2, 6–2 against Sergi Bruguera.

== Seeds ==
A champion seed is indicated in bold text while text in italics indicates the round in which that seed was eliminated.

1. (Croatia) **Goran Ivanišević (champion)**
2. (Netherlands) Richard Krajicek (first round)
3. (Germany) Boris Becker (withdrew — wrist pain)
4. (United Kingdom) Tim Henman (second round)
5. (Germany) Michael Stich (first round)
6. (Spain) Alberto Berasategui (second round)
7. (Switzerland) Marc Rosset (second round)
8. (Spain) Àlex Corretja (first round)

== Draw ==
=== Key ===
- Q = Qualifier
- WC = Wild card
- LL = Lucky loser
- Alt = Alternate
- SE = Special exempt
- PR = Protected ranking
- ITF = ITF entry
- JE = Junior exempt
- w/o = Walkover
- r = Retired
- d = Defaulted
- SR = Special ranking

First round
1	(Croatia) **G Ivanišević**	**7^{7}**	6^{2}	**6**
Q	(Russia) A Olhovskiy	6^{2}	**7^{7}**	2
(France) **C Pioline**	4	**6**	**6**
WC	(Italy) O Camporese	**6**	4	1
(Czech Republic) **D Vacek**	**6**	**7^{8}**
LL	(Netherlands) F Wibier	3	6^{6}
(Czech Republic) **B Ulihrach**	**7**	**6**
8	(Spain) À Corretja	5	0
4	(United Kingdom) **T Henman**	**6**	**6**
(Romania) A Voinea	1	2
(Ukraine) A Medvedev	3	3
(Czech Republic) **P Korda**	**6**	**6**
Q	(Italy) D Musa	1	3
WC	(Australia) **M Philippoussis**	**6**	**6**
(Germany) **D Prinosil**	5	**6**	**6**
5	(Germany) M Stich	**7**	**6**
6	(Spain) **A Berasategui**	**6**	**6**
(Italy) A Gaudenzi	3	4
Q	(Italy) C Caratti	4	2
(Slovakia) **K Kučera**	**6**	**6**
LL	(Italy) **M Martelli**	2	**6**	**6**
(Germany) M-K Goellner	**6**	4	4
(France) G Forget	1	4
Q	(Germany) **N Kiefer**	**6**	**6**
7	(Switzerland) **M Rosset**	**6**	**6**
(Spain) F Clavet	4	2
(France) **A Boetsch**	**6**	**6**
(Morocco) K Alami	2	2
(Spain) **J Sánchez**	4	**6**	**6**
(Spain) C Costa	**6**	3	2
WC	(Spain) **S Bruguera**	4	**7^{7}**	**7^{15}**
2	(Netherlands) R Krajicek	**6**	6^{3}	6^{13}

Second round
1	(Croatia) **G Ivanišević**	**7^{11}**	**7^{7}**
(France) C Pioline	6^{9}	6^{2}
(Czech Republic) **D Vacek**	**7^{7}**	**6**
(Czech Republic) B Ulihrach	6^{3}	3
4	(United Kingdom) T Henman	4	4
(Czech Republic) **P Korda**	**6**	**6**
WC	(Australia) M Philippoussis	**7^{7}**	2	3
(Germany) **D Prinosil**	6^{4}	**6**	**6**
6	(Spain) A Berasategui	6^{4}	2
(Slovakia) **K Kučera**	**7^{7}**	**6**
LL	(Italy) M Martelli	3	4
Q	(Germany) **N Kiefer**	**6**	**6**
7	(Switzerland) M Rosset	**6**	6^{1}	4
(France) **A Boetsch**	3	**7^{7}**	**6**
(Spain) J Sánchez	4	0
WC	(Spain) **S Bruguera**	**6**	**6**

Quarterfinals
1	(Croatia) **G Ivanišević**	**6**	6^{2}	**6**
(Czech Republic) D Vacek	3	**7^{7}**	4
(Czech Republic) P Korda	**6**	6^{3}	3
(Germany) **D Prinosil**	4	**7^{7}**	**6**
(Slovakia) K Kučera	**6**	3	4
Q	(Germany) **N Kiefer**	2	**6**	**6**
(France) A Boetsch	3	**7**	6^{4}
WC	(Spain) **S Bruguera**	**6**	5	**7^{7}**

Semifinals
1	(Croatia) **G Ivanišević**	**6**	**7^{8}**
(Germany) D Prinosil	0	6^{6}
Q	(Germany) N Kiefer	3	4
WC	(Spain) **S Bruguera**	**6**	**6**

Final
1	(Croatia) **Goran Ivanišević**	**6**	**6**
WC	(Spain) Sergi Bruguera	2	2
