= 2002 Milan Indoor – Doubles =

Doubles
- 2002 Milan Indoor

Final
- Champions: (Germany) Karsten Braasch; (Russia) Andrei Olhovskiy
- Runners-up: (France) Julien Boutter; (Belarus) Max Mirnyi
- Score: 3–6, 7–6^{(7–5)}, [12–10]

Events
Singles	Doubles
← 2001 ·	Milan Indoor	· 2003 →

2002 Milan Indoor, Paul Haarhuis and Sjeng Schalken were the defending champions but lost in the semifinals to Julien Boutter and Max Mirnyi.

Karsten Braasch and Andrei Olhovskiy won in the final 3–6, 7–6^{(7–5)}, [12–10] against Boutter and Mirnyi.

== Seeds ==
1. (Netherlands) Paul Haarhuis / (Netherlands) Sjeng Schalken (semifinals)
2. (South Africa) David Adams / (Australia) David Macpherson (first round)
3. (Czech Republic) Leoš Friedl / (Czech Republic) Radek Štěpánek (quarterfinals)
4. (South Africa) Marius Barnard / (Czech Republic) Cyril Suk (first round)

== Draw ==
=== Key ===
- Q = Qualifier
- WC = Wild card
- LL = Lucky loser
- Alt = Alternate
- SE = Special exempt
- PR = Protected ranking
- ITF = ITF entry
- JE = Junior exempt
- w/o = Walkover
- r = Retired
- d = Defaulted
- SR = Special ranking

First round

Quarterfinals

Semifinals

Final

1
- (Netherlands) P Haarhuis
- (Netherlands) S Schalken
6^{0}
6
[10]

WC
- (Italy) C Caratti
- (Italy) G Pozzi
7^{7}
3
[4]

1
- (Netherlands) P Haarhuis
- (Netherlands) S Schalken
w/o

- (Italy) A Gaudenzi
- (Russia) M Youzhny
6^{1}
6^{6}

- (United States) J-M Gambill
- (Italy) D Sanguinetti

- (United States) J-M Gambill
- (Italy) D Sanguinetti
7^{7}
7^{8}

1
- (Netherlands) P Haarhuis
- (Netherlands) S Schalken
7
3
[6]

3
- (Czech Republic) L Friedl
- (Czech Republic) R Štěpánek
6
6

- (France) J Boutter
- (Belarus) M Mirnyi
5
6
[10]

- (United States) J Tarango
- (Czech Republic) D Vacek
4
2

3
- (Czech Republic) L Friedl
- (Czech Republic) R Štěpánek
7^{7}
2
[8]

- (Sweden) S Aspelin
- (Sweden) P Nyborg
2
6^{3}

- (France) J Boutter
- (Belarus) M Mirnyi
6^{5}
6
[10]

- (France) J Boutter
- (Belarus) M Mirnyi
6
7^{7}

- (France) J Boutter
- (Belarus) M Mirnyi
6
6^{5}
[10]

WC
- (Italy) M Bertolini
- (Italy) C Brandi
7^{7}
6^{4}
[2]

- (Germany) K Braasch
- (Russia) A Olhovskiy
3
7^{7}
[12]

WC
- (Italy) D Bracciali
- (Italy) F Luzzi
6^{1}
7^{7}
[10]

WC
- (Italy) D Bracciali
- (Italy) F Luzzi

- (Germany) K Braasch
- (Russia) A Olhovskiy
7^{8}
6

- (Germany) K Braasch
- (Russia) A Olhovskiy
w/o

4
- (South Africa) M Barnard
- (Czech Republic) C Suk
6^{6}
3

- (Germany) K Braasch
- (Russia) A Olhovskiy
6
6

- (Brazil) A Sá
- (Federal Republic of Yugoslavia) N Zimonjić
3
6
[10]

- (Brazil) A Sá
- (Federal Republic of Yugoslavia) N Zimonjić
4
4

- (North Macedonia) A Kitinov
- (Sweden) J Landsberg
6
4
[6]

- (Brazil) A Sá
- (Federal Republic of Yugoslavia) N Zimonjić
7
6

- (Czech Republic) T Cibulec
- (Czech Republic) P Luxa
6
6

- (Czech Republic) T Cibulec
- (Czech Republic) P Luxa
5
3

2
- (South Africa) D Adams
- (Australia) D Macpherson
4
2
