= 2004 Indesit ATP Milan Indoor – Singles =

Singles
- 2004 Indesit ATP Milan Indoor

Final
- Champion: (France) Antony Dupuis
- Runner-up: (Croatia) Mario Ančić
- Score: 6–4, 6–7^{(12–14)}, 7–6^{(7–5)}

Details
- Draw: 32 (4Q / 3WC)
- Seeds: 8

Events
Singles	Doubles
← 2003 ·	Milan Indoor	· 2005 →

Martin Verkerk was the defending champion but lost in the quarterfinals to Grégory Carraz.

Antony Dupuis won in the final 6–4, 6–7^{(12–14)}, 7–6^{(7–5)} against Mario Ančić.

== Seeds ==
A champion seed is indicated in bold text while text in italics indicates the round in which that seed was eliminated.

1. (Czech Republic) ~~Jiří Novák~~ (withdrew because of a leg injury)
2. (Netherlands) Martin Verkerk (quarterfinals)
3. (Spain) Tommy Robredo (quarterfinals)
4. (Spain) Feliciano López (first round)
5. (Croatia) Ivan Ljubičić (first round)
6. (Spain) Rafael Nadal (second round)
7. (Armenia) Sargis Sargsian (second round)
8. (Slovakia) Dominik Hrbatý (second round)

== Draw ==
Key

- Q = Qualifier
- WC = Wild card
- LL = Lucky loser
- Alt = Alternate
- ITF = ITF entry
- PR = Protected ranking
- SR = Special ranking
- SE = Special exempt
- JE = Junior exempt
- JR = Junior Accelerator Programme entrant
- CO = College Accelerator Programme entrant
- NG = Next Gen Accelerator Program entrant
- w/o = Walkover
- r = Retired
- d = Defaulted

First round
LL	(Italy) D Bracciali	5	4
(Netherlands) **R Sluiter**	**7**	**6**
(Sweden) **T Johansson**	**6**	**6**
(Russia) N Davydenko	3	4
(Czech Republic) R Štěpánek	6^{5}	2
(Slovakia) **K Kučera**	**7^{7}**	**6**
Q	(Italy) A Seppi	1	4
7	(Armenia) **S Sargsian**	**6**	**6**
3	(Spain) **T Robredo**	**6**	**7**
WC	(Spain) À Corretja	4	5
WC	(Croatia) **G Ivanišević**	**7^{7}**	3	**7^{7}**
(Czech Republic) B Ulihrach	6^{2}	**6**	6^{3}
(France) F Santoro	2	3
(Croatia) **M Ančić**	**6**	**6**
(Croatia) I Karlović	5	**7^{7}**	1
6	(Spain) **R Nadal**	**7**	6^{5}	**6**
8	(Slovakia) **D Hrbatý**	4	**6**	**6**
(Russia) I Andreev	**6**	3	2
(Russia) **M Youzhny**	**7^{7}**	**6**
WC	(Italy) G Galimberti	6^{5}	3
Q	(Switzerland) **I Heuberger**	**6**	**6**
(Spain) A Martín	1	4
(France) **A Dupuis**	**6**	**7^{8}**
4	(Spain) F López	3	6^{6}
5	(Croatia) I Ljubičić	4	4
(Slovakia) **K Beck**	**6**	**6**
Q	(Italy) V Santopadre	**7^{10}**	3	3
(France) **G Carraz**	6^{8}	**6**	**6**
Q	(Switzerland) S Bohli	3	4
(France) **N Escudé**	**6**	**6**
(Italy) D Sanguinetti	4	6^{0}
2	(Netherlands) **M Verkerk**	**6**	**7^{7}**

Second round
(Netherlands) R Sluiter	3	3
(Sweden) **T Johansson**	**6**	**6**
(Slovakia) **K Kučera**	**6**	**6**
7	(Armenia) S Sargsian	2	1
3	(Spain) **T Robredo**	**6**	5	**7^{7}**
WC	(Croatia) G Ivanišević	4	**7**	6^{4}
(Croatia) **M Ančić**	**7**	**6**
6	(Spain) R Nadal	5	2
8	(Slovakia) D Hrbatý	4	3
(Russia) **M Youzhny**	**6**	**6**
Q	(Switzerland) I Heuberger	6^{4}	3
(France) **A Dupuis**	**7^{7}**	**6**
(Slovakia) K Beck	4	**7^{16}**	6^{5}
(France) **G Carraz**	**6**	6^{14}	**7^{7}**
(France) N Escudé	3	4
(Netherlands) **M Verkerk**	**6**	**6**

Quarterfinals
(Sweden) **T Johansson**	**7^{7}**	**7^{7}**
(Slovakia) K Kučera	6^{2}	6^{2}
3	(Spain) T Robredo	3	4
(Croatia) **M Ančić**	**6**	**6**
(Russia) M Youzhny	**7**	6^{5}	6^{5}
(France) **A Dupuis**	5	**7^{7}**	**7^{7}**
(France) **G Carraz**	**6**	**7^{7}**
2	(Netherlands) M Verkerk	3	6^{3}

Semifinals
(Sweden) T Johansson	3	4
(Croatia) **M Ančić**	**6**	**6**
(France) **A Dupuis**	**6**	**6**
(France) G Carraz	4	4

Final
(Croatia) Mario Ančić	4	**7^{14}**	6^{5}
(France) **Antony Dupuis**	**6**	6^{12}	**7^{7}**
