= 1999 Guardian Direct Cup – Singles =

Singles
- 1999 Guardian Direct Cup

Final
- Champions: (Netherlands) Richard Krajicek
- Runners-up: (United Kingdom) Greg Rusedski
- Score: 7–6^{(8–6)}, 6–7^{(5–7)}, 7–5

Details
- Draw: 32
- Seeds: 8

Events
Singles	Doubles
← 1998 ·	Milan Indoor	· 2000 →

The 1999 Guardian Direct Cup was a men's tennis tournament played on indoor carpet courts in London, Great Britain, that was part of the Championship Series of the 1999 ATP Tour. It was the 22nd edition of the tournament and was held from 22 February until 28 February 1999.

== Seeds ==
Champion seeds are indicated in bold text while text in italics indicates the round in which those seeds were eliminated.

1. (Russia) Yevgeny Kafelnikov (quarterfinals)
2. (United Kingdom) Tim Henman (first round)
3. (United Kingdom) Greg Rusedski (final)
4. (Netherlands) **Richard Krajicek (champion)**
5. (Slovakia) Karol Kučera (quarterfinals)
6. (Sweden) Thomas Enqvist (quarterfinals)
7. (Croatia) Goran Ivanišević (second round)
8. (Sweden) Thomas Johansson (semifinals)

== Draw ==
Key

- Q = Qualifier
- WC = Wild card
- LL = Lucky loser
- Alt = Alternate
- ITF = ITF entry
- PR = Protected ranking
- SR = Special ranking
- SE = Special exempt
- JE = Junior exempt
- JR = Junior Accelerator Programme entrant
- CO = College Accelerator Programme entrant
- NG = Next Gen Accelerator Program entrant
- w/o = Walkover
- r = Retired
- d = Defaulted

=== Finals ===
Semifinals
8	(Sweden) Thomas Johansson	2	4
4	**(Netherlands) Richard Krajicek**	**6**	**6**
3	**(United Kingdom) Greg Rusedski**	**6**	**6**
(Morocco) Hicham Arazi	2	3

Final
4	**(Netherlands) Richard Krajicek**	**7**	6^{5}	**7**
3	(United Kingdom) Greg Rusedski	6^{6}	**7**	5

=== Top half ===
First round
1	**(Russia) Y Kafelnikov**	**6**	3	**6**
(Sweden) M Gustafsson	2	**6**	3
**(Zimbabwe) B Black**	**6**	1	**7**
(Morocco) K Alami	1	**6**	6^{4}
**(Italy) D Sanguinetti**	**6**	**6**
(United States) J-M Gambill	4	4
8	**(Sweden) T Johansson**	**6**	**6**
(Czech Republic) P Luxa	2	4
4	**(Netherlands) R Krajicek**	**6**	**6**
(United States) J Tarango	4	2
**(Germany) N Kiefer**	5	**6**	**7**
(France) C Pioline	**7**	2	5
**(France) G Raoux**	**6**	**6**
(Czech Republic) D Vacek	4	3
5	**(Slovakia) K Kučera**	**7**	**6**
(Germany) R Schüttler	6^{2}	0

Second round
1	**(Russia) Y Kafelnikov**	**6**	**6**
(Zimbabwe) B Black	3	2
(Italy) D Sanguinetti	0	**7**	2
8	**(Sweden) T Johansson**	**6**	6^{3}	**6**
4	**(Netherlands) R Krajicek**	**6**	**6**
(Germany) N Kiefer	3	4
(France) G Raoux	2	0
5	**(Slovakia) K Kučera**	**6**	**6**

Quarterfinals
1	(Russia) Y Kafelnikov	2	6^{5}
8	**(Sweden) T Johansson**	**6**	**7**
4	**(Netherlands) R Krajicek**	**6**	**6**
5	(Slovakia) K Kučera	1	3

Semifinals
8	(Sweden) T Johansson	2	4
4	**(Netherlands) R Krajicek**	**6**	**6**

=== Bottom half ===
First round
6	**(Sweden) T Enqvist**	**6**	**6**
(Switzerland) M Rosset	1	3
**(Germany) D Prinosil**	**7**	**6**
(Romania) A Pavel	6^{5}	3
**(Czech Republic) P Korda**	**6**	**6**
(South Africa) W Ferreira	3	4
3	**(United Kingdom) G Rusedski**	**6**	**6**
(Italy) G Pozzi	2	1
7	**(Croatia) G Ivanišević**	**6**	0	**7**
(Netherlands) J Siemerink	3	**6**	6^{1}
**(Morocco) H Arazi**	**7**	**6**
(Czech Republic) B Ulihrach	5	4
**(Slovakia) D Hrbatý**	**6**	6^{3}	**6**
(Italy) S Pescosolido	3	**7**	2
**(Slovakia) J Krošlák**	2	**7**	**6**
2	(United Kingdom) T Henman	**6**	6^{8}	4

Second round
6	**(Sweden) T Enqvist**	**6**	**7**
(Germany) D Prinosil	4	5
(Czech Republic) P Korda	3	6^{4}
3	**(United Kingdom) G Rusedski**	**6**	**7**
7	(Croatia) G Ivanišević	**6**	3	4
**(Morocco) H Arazi**	3	**6**	**6**
**(Slovakia) D Hrbatý**	**6**	**6**
(Slovakia) J Krošlák	2	3

Quarterfinals
6	(Sweden) T Enqvist	5	**6**	3
3	**(United Kingdom) G Rusedski**	**7**	4	**6**
**(Morocco) H Arazi**	**6**	**6**
(Slovakia) D Hrbatý	4	2

Semifinals
3	**(United Kingdom) G Rusedski**	**6**	**6**
(Morocco) H Arazi	2	3
