= 2001 Milan Indoor – Doubles =

Doubles
- 2001 Milan Indoor

Final
- Champions: (Netherlands) Paul Haarhuis; (Netherlands) Sjeng Schalken
- Runners-up: (Sweden) Johan Landsberg; (Belgium) Tom Vanhoudt
- Score: 7–6^{(7–5)}, 7–6^{(7–4)}

Details
- Draw: 16 (1Q / 3WC)
- Seeds: 4

Events
Singles	Doubles
← 2000 ·	Milan Indoor	· 2002 →

2001 Milan Indoor, David Adams and John-Laffnie de Jager were the defending champions but only Adams competed that year with Marius Barnard.

Adams and Barnard lost in the first round to Julien Boutter and Fabrice Santoro.

Paul Haarhuis and Sjeng Schalken won in the final 7–6^{(7–5)}, 7–6^{(7–4)} against Johan Landsberg and Tom Vanhoudt.

== Seeds ==
1. (India) Mahesh Bhupathi / (Slovakia) Dominik Hrbatý (first round)
2. (South Africa) David Adams / (South Africa) Marius Barnard (first round, withdrew due to a flu on Adams)
3. (Australia) Michael Hill / (United States) Jeff Tarango (semifinals)
4. (Sweden) Johan Landsberg / (Belgium) Tom Vanhoudt (final)

== Draw ==
=== Key ===
- Q = Qualifier
- WC = Wild card
- LL = Lucky loser
- Alt = Alternate
- SE = Special exempt
- PR = Protected ranking
- ITF = ITF entry
- JE = Junior exempt
- w/o = Walkover
- r = Retired
- d = Defaulted
- SR = Special ranking

First round

Quarterfinals

Semifinals

Final

1
- (India) M Bhupathi
- (Slovakia) D Hrbatý
6
4
1

- (Germany) M-K Goellner
- (Russia) A Olhovskiy
4
6
6

- (Germany) M-K Goellner
- (Russia) A Olhovskiy
3
6
7^{7}

- (United States) J-M Gambill
- (Israel) H Levy
3
6
6

- (United States) J-M Gambill
- (Israel) H Levy
6
3
6^{1}

WC
- (Germany) N Kiefer
- (Russia) M Safin
6
4
1

- (Germany) M-K Goellner
- (Russia) A Olhovskiy
3
6^{5}

4
- (Sweden) J Landsberg
- (Belgium) T Vanhoudt
7^{8}
7

4
- (Sweden) J Landsberg
- (Belgium) T Vanhoudt
6
7^{7}

WC
- (France) N Escudé
- (Switzerland) M Rosset
6^{6}
5

4
- (Sweden) J Landsberg
- (Belgium) T Vanhoudt
7^{7}
6

- (Czech Republic) C Suk
- (Czech Republic) P Vízner
3
4

- (Czech Republic) T Cibulec
- (Czech Republic) L Friedl
6^{3}
4

- (Czech Republic) T Cibulec
- (Czech Republic) L Friedl
6
6

4
- (Sweden) J Landsberg
- (Belgium) T Vanhoudt
6^{5}
6^{4}

- (Japan) T Shimada
- (United States) J Waite
2
2

- (Netherlands) P Haarhuis
- (Netherlands) S Schalken
7^{7}
7^{7}

Q
- (Switzerland) I Heuberger
- (Germany) R Schüttler
6
6

Q
- (Switzerland) I Heuberger
- (Germany) R Schüttler
7
1
4

WC
- (Italy) A Gaudenzi
- (Croatia) G Ivanišević
6^{5}
7
6^{3}

3
- (Australia) M Hill
- (United States) J Tarango
5
6
6

3
- (Australia) M Hill
- (United States) J Tarango
7^{7}
5
7^{7}

3
- (Australia) M Hill
- (United States) J Tarango
6
0
2

- (Netherlands) P Haarhuis
- (Netherlands) S Schalken
6
6

- (Netherlands) P Haarhuis
- (Netherlands) S Schalken
3
6
6

- (Italy) C Brandi
- (Croatia) I Ljubičić
4
4

- (Netherlands) P Haarhuis
- (Netherlands) S Schalken
6
3
6

- (France) J Boutter
- (France) F Santoro
w/o

- (France) J Boutter
- (France) F Santoro
3
6
0

2
- (South Africa) D Adams
- (South Africa) M Barnard

== Qualifying ==
=== Qualifying seeds ===
1. (North Macedonia) Aleksandar Kitinov / (France) Jean-René Lisnard (qualifying competition, withdrew)
2. (Switzerland) Ivo Heuberger / (Germany) Rainer Schüttler (qualified)

=== Qualifiers ===
1. (Switzerland) Ivo Heuberger / (Germany) Rainer Schüttler

=== Qualifying draw ===
First round
1	(North Macedonia) Aleksandar Kitinov (France) Jean-René Lisnard	7^{7}	6
WC	(Italy) Daniele Bracciali (Italy) Federico Luzzi	6^{3}	4
(Switzerland) George Bastl (Italy) Stefano Pescosolido	6	3	4
2	(Switzerland) Ivo Heuberger (Germany) Rainer Schüttler	4	6	6

Qualifying competition
1	(North Macedonia) Aleksandar Kitinov (France) Jean-René Lisnard
2	(Switzerland) Ivo Heuberger (Germany) Rainer Schüttler	w/o
