= 1997 Italian Indoor =

- Date: 24 February – 2 March
- Edition: 20th
- Category: Championship Series
- Draw: 32S / 16D
- Prize money: $689,250
- Surface: Carpet / indoor
- Location: Milan, Italy
- Venue: Palatrussardi

Champions

Singles
- (Croatia) Goran Ivanišević

Doubles
- (Argentina) Pablo Albano / (Sweden) Peter Nyborg
- Italian Indoor

The 1997 Italian Indoor was a men's tennis tournament played on indoor carpet courts at the Palatrussardi in Milan, Italy and was part of the Championship Series of the 1997 ATP Tour. It was the 20th edition of the tournament and was held from 24 February until 2 March 1997. First-seeded Goran Ivanišević won the singles title.

== Finals ==
=== Singles ===
(Croatia) Goran Ivanišević defeated (Spain) Sergi Bruguera 6–2, 6–2

- It was Ivanišević's 2nd singles title of the year and the 19th of his career.

=== Doubles ===
(Argentina) Pablo Albano / (Sweden) Peter Nyborg defeated (South Africa) David Adams / (Russia) Andrei Olhovskiy 6–4, 7–6

- It was Albano's 1st title of the year and the 5th of his career. It was Nyborg's only title of the year and the 3rd of his career.
