= 2000 Axa Cup – Doubles =

Doubles
- 2000 AXA Cup

Final
- Champions: (South Africa) David Adams (South Africa) John-Laffnie de Jager
- Runners-up: (United States) Jan-Michael Gambill (United States) Scott Humphries
- Score: 6–3, 6–7^{(7–9)}, 7–6^{(13–11)}

Details
- Draw: 16
- Seeds: 4

Events
Singles	Doubles
- Milan Indoor

2000 Axa Cup, Tim Henman and Greg Rusedski were the defending champions, only Henman competed (with Yevgeny Kafelnikov) but lost in the quarterfinals.

Third-seeds David Adams and John-Laffnie de Jager won the title, defeating Jan-Michael Gambill and Scott Humphries in the final.

== Seeds ==
Champion seeds are indicated in bold text while text in italics indicates the round in which those seeds were eliminated.

1. (Sweden) Jonas Björkman / (Australia) Andrew Kratzmann (first round)
2. (Australia) Wayne Arthurs / (Australia) Sandon Stolle (quarterfinals)
3. (South Africa) **David Adams / (South Africa) John-Laffnie de Jager (champions)**
4. (France) Olivier Delaître / (United States) Jeff Tarango (first round)

== Draw ==
Key

- Q = Qualifier
- WC = Wild card
- LL = Lucky loser
- Alt = Alternate
- ITF = ITF entry
- PR = Protected ranking
- SR = Special ranking
- SE = Special exempt
- JE = Junior exempt
- JR = Junior Accelerator Programme entrant
- CO = College Accelerator Programme entrant
- NG = Next Gen Accelerator Program entrant
- w/o = Walkover
- r = Retired
- d = Defaulted

First round
1	(Sweden) J Björkman (Australia) A Kratzmann	2	6^{2}
WC	**(United Kingdom) T Henman** **(Russia) Y Kafelnikov**	**6**	**7^{7}**
LL	(United States) D Bowen (Spain) A Martín	6^{5}	6^{1}
**(Australia) D Macpherson** **(Sweden) P Nyborg**	**7^{7}**	**7^{7}**
3	**(South Africa) D Adams** **(South Africa) J-L de Jager**	**6**	**6**
Q	(Japan) T Shimada (South Africa) M Wakefield	3	4
(North Macedonia) A Kitinov (Belgium) T Vanhoudt	**6**	6^{1}	4
**(France) F Santoro** **(Czech Republic) D Vacek**	4	**7^{7}**	**6**
WC	**(Slovakia) K Kučera** **(Russia) M Safin**	2	**7^{7}**	**6**
(United Kingdom) N Broad (South Africa) P Norval	**6**	6^{4}	0
**(United States) J-M Gambill** **(United States) S Humphries**	**6**	**7^{7}**
4	(France) O Delaître (United States) J Tarango	2	6^{5}
(South Africa) M Barnard (South Africa) C Haggard	3	**6**	3
**(Australia) J Eagle** **(Australia) A Florent**	**6**	4	**6**
WC	(Croatia) G Ivanišević (Croatia) I Ljubičić	**7**	6^{2}	3
2	**(Australia) W Arthurs** **(Australia) S Stolle**	5	**7^{7}**	**6**

Quarterfinals
WC	(United Kingdom) T Henman (Russia) Y Kafelnikov	5	6^{4}
**(Australia) D Macpherson** **(Sweden) P Nyborg**	**7**	**7^{7}**
3	**(South Africa) D Adams** **(South Africa) J-L de Jager**	3	**6**	**6**
(France) F Santoro (Czech Republic) D Vacek	**6**	1	2
WC	(Slovakia) K Kučera (Russia) M Safin	3	**6**	4
**(United States) J-M Gambill** **(United States) S Humphries**	**6**	4	**6**
**(Australia) J Eagle** **(Australia) A Florent**	**6**	**7^{7}**
2	(Australia) W Arthurs (Australia) S Stolle	3	6^{3}

Semifinals
(Australia) D Macpherson (Sweden) P Nyborg	**6**	2	4
3	**(South Africa) D Adams** **(South Africa) J-L de Jager**	1	**6**	**6**
**(United States) J-M Gambill** **(United States) S Humphries**	6^{5}	**6**	**6**
(Australia) J Eagle (Australia) A Florent	**7^{7}**	4	4

Final
3	**(South Africa) D Adams** **(South Africa) J-L de Jager**	**6**	6^{7}	**7^{13}**
(United States) J-M Gambill (United States) S Humphries	3	**7^{9}**	6^{11}
