= 2003 Breil Milano Indoor – Singles =

Singles
- 2003 Breil Milano Indoor

Final
- Champion: (Netherlands) Martin Verkerk
- Runner-up: (Russia) Yevgeny Kafelnikov
- Score: 6–4, 5–7, 7–5

Details
- Draw: 32 (4Q / 3WC)
- Seeds: 8

Events
Singles	Doubles
← 2002 ·	Milan Indoor	· 2004 →

Davide Sanguinetti was the defending champion but lost in the quarterfinals to Martin Verkerk.

Verkerk won in the final 6–4, 5–7, 7–5 against Yevgeny Kafelnikov.

== Seeds ==
A champion seed is indicated in bold text while text in italics indicates the round in which that seed was eliminated.

1. (Czech Republic) Jiří Novák (first round)
2. (Netherlands) Sjeng Schalken (first round)
3. (Morocco) Younes El Aynaoui (first round)
4. (Belgium) Xavier Malisse (second round)
5. (Russia) Yevgeny Kafelnikov (final)
6. (France) ~~Fabrice Santoro~~ (withdrew because of general fatigue)
7. (France) Nicolas Escudé (first round)
8. (Finland) Jarkko Nieminen (semifinals)

== Draw ==
=== Key ===
- Q = Qualifier
- WC = Wild card
- LL = Lucky loser
- Alt = Alternate
- SE = Special exempt
- PR = Protected ranking
- ITF = ITF entry
- JE = Junior exempt
- w/o = Walkover
- r = Retired
- d = Defaulted
- SR = Special ranking

First round
1	(Czech Republic) J Novák	4	3
(Czech Republic) **R Štěpánek**	**6**	**6**
WC	(Netherlands) **R Krajicek**	**7**	**6**
(Russia) N Davydenko	5	2
(Belarus) V Voltchkov	**6**	3	4
(France) **A Dupuis**	4	**6**	**6**
(Switzerland) M Kratochvil	4	**6**	1
8	(Finland) **J Nieminen**	**6**	3	**6**
3	(Morocco) Y El Aynaoui	5	3
WC	(Italy) **A Gaudenzi**	**7**	**6**
Q	(Sweden) **J Björkman**	**7**	**6**
Q	(Czech Republic) T Zíb	5	3
WC	(Morocco) H Arazi	3	**6**	3
(Denmark) **K Pless**	**6**	1	**6**
Q	(Argentina) M Charpentier	2	5
5	(Russia) **Y Kafelnikov**	**6**	**7**
7	(France) N Escudé	4	**6**	3
(Slovakia) **D Hrbatý**	**6**	1	**6**
(Croatia) **I Ljubičić**	**7**	**6**
(Belgium) O Rochus	5	3
Q	(France) **J Varlet**	**6**	**6**
(Spain) F López	3	4
(Brazil) A Sá	4	4
4	(Belgium) **X Malisse**	**6**	**6**
LL	(Italy) G Galimberti	2	4
(Italy) **D Sanguinetti**	**6**	**6**
(Denmark) K Carlsen	5	**6**	0/r
(Belarus) **M Mirnyi**	**7**	2	**4**
(Netherlands) **M Verkerk**	**6**	6^{3}	**6**
(Romania) A Voinea	3	**7^{7}**	4
(Sweden) **T Enqvist**	**6**	**6**
2	(Netherlands) S Schalken	4	3

Second round
(Czech Republic) R Štěpánek	**6**	3	6^{13}
WC	(Netherlands) **R Krajicek**	3	**6**	**7^{15}**
(France) A Dupuis	6^{4}	**6**	4
8	(Finland) **J Nieminen**	**7^{7}**	2	**6**
WC	(Italy) A Gaudenzi	2	1
Q	(Sweden) **J Björkman**	**6**	**6**
(Denmark) K Pless	4	3
5	(Russia) **Y Kafelnikov**	**6**	**6**
(Slovakia) D Hrbatý	**7^{7}**	6^{6}	4
(Croatia) **I Ljubičić**	6^{3}	**7^{8}**	**6**
Q	(France) **J Varlet**	2	**7**	**7^{8}**
4	(Belgium) X Malisse	**6**	5	6^{6}
(Italy) **D Sanguinetti**	1	**6**	**7^{11}**
(Belarus) M Mirnyi	**6**	3	6^{9}
(Netherlands) **M Verkerk**	**6**	**6**
(Sweden) T Enqvist	3	4

Quarterfinals
WC	(Netherlands) R Krajicek	6^{7}	5
8	(Finland) **J Nieminen**	**7^{9}**	**7**
Q	(Sweden) J Björkman	3	4
5	(Russia) **Y Kafelnikov**	**6**	**6**
(Croatia) **I Ljubičić**	**6**	**6**
Q	(France) J Varlet	4	1
(Italy) D Sanguinetti	5	3
(Netherlands) **M Verkerk**	**7**	**6**

Semifinals
8	(Finland) J Nieminen	6^{8}	3
5	(Russia) **Y Kafelnikov**	**7^{10}**	**6**
(Croatia) I Ljubičić	**6**	5	6^{1}
(Netherlands) **M Verkerk**	3	**7**	**7^{7}**

Final
5	(Russia) Yevgeny Kafelnikov	4	**7**	5
(Netherlands) **Martin Verkerk**	**6**	5	**7**
