= 1999 Guardian Direct Cup =

- Date: 22–28 February
- Edition: 22nd
- Category: Championship Series
- Draw: 32S / 16D
- Surface: Carpet / indoor
- Location: London, England
- Venue: Battersea Park

Champions

Singles
- (Netherlands) Richard Krajicek

Doubles
- (United Kingdom) Tim Henman / (United Kingdom) Greg Rusedski
- Milan Indoor

The 1999 Guardian Direct Cup was a men's tennis tournament played on indoor Carpet court at the Battersea Park in London, Great Britain, that was part of the Championship Series of the 1999 ATP Tour. It was the 22nd edition of the tournament, the second one held in London, England, and was held from 22 February until 28 February 1999. Fifth-seeded Richard Krajicek won the singles title.

== Finals ==
=== Singles ===
(Netherlands) Richard Krajicek defeated (United Kingdom) Greg Rusedski, 7–6^{(8–6)}, 6–7^{(5–7)}, 7–5

- It was Krajicek's 1st singles title of the year and the 16th of his career.

=== Doubles ===
(United Kingdom) Tim Henman / (United Kingdom) Greg Rusedski defeated (Zimbabwe) Byron Black / (South Africa) Wayne Ferreira, 6–3, 7–6^{(8–6)}
