= 1997 Italian Indoor – Doubles =

Doubles
- 1997 Italian Indoor

Final
- Champions: (Argentina) Pablo Albano (Sweden) Peter Nyborg
- Runners-up: (South Africa) David Adams (Russia) Andrei Olhovskiy
- Score: 6–4, 7–6

Details
- Draw: 16
- Seeds: 4

Events
Singles	Doubles
- Italian Indoor

1997 Italian Indoor, Andrea Gaudenzi and Goran Ivanišević were the defending champions but they competed with different partners that year, Gaudenzi with Marc Rosset and Ivanišević with Saša Hiršzon.

Gaudenzi and Rosset lost in the first round to Pablo Albano and Peter Nyborg, as did Hiršzon and Ivanišević to David Adams and Andrei Olhovskiy.

Albano and Nyborg won in the final 6–4, 7–6 against Adams and Olhovskiy.

== Seeds ==
Champion seeds are indicated in bold text while text in italics indicates the round in which those seeds were eliminated.

1. (France) Guy Forget / (Czech Republic) Daniel Vacek (quarterfinals)
2. (Belgium) Libor Pimek / (South Africa) Byron Talbot (semifinals)
3. (South Africa) David Adams / (Russia) Andrei Olhovskiy (final)
4. (South Africa) Marius Barnard / (South Africa) Piet Norval (first round)

== Draw ==
Key

- Q = Qualifier
- WC = Wild card
- LL = Lucky loser
- Alt = Alternate
- ITF = ITF entry
- PR = Protected ranking
- SR = Special ranking
- SE = Special exempt
- JE = Junior exempt
- JR = Junior Accelerator Programme entrant
- CO = College Accelerator Programme entrant
- NG = Next Gen Accelerator Program entrant
- w/o = Walkover
- r = Retired
- d = Defaulted

First round
1	(France) **G Forget** (Czech Republic) **D Vacek**	**7**	**7**
(Netherlands) S Noteboom (Netherlands) F Wibier	5	6
(Argentina) **P Albano** (Sweden) **P Nyborg**	**6**	**7**
WC	(Italy) A Gaudenzi (Switzerland) M Rosset	3	6
4	(South Africa) M Barnard (South Africa) P Norval	6	**6**	4
(Netherlands) **H J Davids** (Netherlands) **M Oosting**	**7**	1	**6**
WC	(Italy) **O Camporese** (Italy) **D Nargiso**	**7**	**6**
(South Africa) J-L de Jager (United States) M Keil	6	1
(Netherlands) **T Kempers** (Netherlands) **T Nijssen**	**7**	**6**
Q	(Italy) N Bruno (Italy) M Martelli	6	2
(Croatia) S Hiršzon (Croatia) G Ivanišević	6	6
3	(South Africa) **D Adams** (Russia) **A Olhovskiy**	**7**	**7**
(Germany) D Prinosil (Czech Republic) P Vízner	**6**	6	4
WC	(Ukraine) **A Medvedev** (Germany) **M Stich**	3	**7**	**6**
(Spain) J A Conde (Spain) J Sánchez	4	4
2	(Belgium) **L Pimek** (South Africa) **B Talbot**	**6**	**6**

Quarterfinals
1	(France) G Forget (Czech Republic) D Vacek	4	6
(Argentina) **P Albano** (Sweden) **P Nyborg**	**6**	**7**
(Netherlands) H J Davids (Netherlands) M Oosting	6	5
WC	(Italy) **O Camporese** (Italy) **D Nargiso**	**7**	**7**
(Netherlands) T Kempers (Netherlands) T Nijssen	**7**	4	4
3	(South Africa) **D Adams** (Russia) **A Olhovskiy**	6	**6**	**6**
WC	(Ukraine) A Medvedev (Germany) M Stich	**6**	4	2
2	(Belgium) **L Pimek** (South Africa) **B Talbot**	3	**6**	**6**

Semifinals
(Argentina) **P Albano** (Sweden) **P Nyborg**	**7**	**6**
WC	(Italy) O Camporese (Italy) D Nargiso	6	4
3	(South Africa) **D Adams** (Russia) **A Olhovskiy**	**6**	**7**
2	(Belgium) L Pimek (South Africa) B Talbot	4	6

Final
(Argentina) **P Albano** (Sweden) **P Nyborg**	**6**	**7**
3	(South Africa) D Adams (Russia) A Olhovskiy	4	6
