= 1986 Milan Indoor – Singles =

Singles
- 1986 Milan Indoor

Final
- Champion: (Czechoslovakia) Ivan Lendl
- Runner-up: (Sweden) Joakim Nyström
- Score: 6–2, 6–2, 6–4

Details
- Draw: 32
- Seeds: 8

Events
Singles	Doubles
- Milan Indoor

John McEnroe was the defending champion, but did not participate this year.

Ivan Lendl won the tournament, beating Joakim Nyström in the final, 6–2, 6–2, 6–4.

== Seeds ==
1. (Czechoslovakia) Ivan Lendl (champion)
2. (Sweden) Joakim Nyström (final)
3. (Sweden) Anders Järryd (semifinals)
4. (Czechoslovakia) Miloslav Mečíř (semifinals)
5. (Sweden) Henrik Sundström (first round)
6. (Czechoslovakia) Tomáš Šmíd (first round)
7. (Switzerland) Jakob Hlasek (quarterfinals)
8. (Sweden) Jan Gunnarsson (second round)

== Draw ==
Key

- Q = Qualifier
- WC = Wild card
- LL = Lucky loser
- Alt = Alternate
- ITF = ITF entry
- PR = Protected ranking
- SR = Special ranking
- SE = Special exempt
- JE = Junior exempt
- JR = Junior Accelerator Programme entrant
- CO = College Accelerator Programme entrant
- NG = Next Gen Accelerator Program entrant
- w/o = Walkover
- r = Retired
- d = Defaulted

=== Finals ===
Semifinals
1	(Czechoslovakia) Ivan Lendl	7	6
4	(Czechoslovakia) Miloslav Mečíř	5	4
3	(Sweden) Anders Järryd	3	6
2	(Sweden) Joakim Nyström	6	7

Final
1	(Czechoslovakia) Ivan Lendl	6	6	6
2	(Sweden) Joakim Nyström	2	2	4

=== Top half ===
First round
1	(Czechoslovakia) I Lendl	6	6
(Spain) J Aguilera	3	1
Q	(Socialist Federal Republic of Yugoslavia) M Ostoja	6	6	6
(Spain) J López-Maeso	4	7	2
Q	(Italy) M Fioroni	6	4	4
(Czechoslovakia) M Vajda	4	6	6
Q	(Sweden) T Högstedt	4	2
7	(Switzerland) J Hlasek	6	6
4	(Czechoslovakia) M Mečíř	2	7	6
WC	(Italy) P Canè	6	6	3
(Israel) S Perkiss	6	3	3
(Australia) J Fitzgerald	3	6	6
(Italy) F Cancellotti	3	6	2
(Spain) S Casal	6	4	6
(New Zealand) R Simpson	4	7	6
5	(Sweden) H Sundström	6	6	2

Second round
1	(Czechoslovakia) I Lendl	6	7
Q	(Socialist Federal Republic of Yugoslavia) M Ostoja	1	5
(Czechoslovakia) M Vajda	6	3
7	(Switzerland) J Hlasek	7	6
4	(Czechoslovakia) M Mečíř	6	6
(Australia) J Fitzgerald	2	4
(Spain) S Casal	6	3	7
(New Zealand) R Simpson	2	6	6

Quarterfinals
1	(Czechoslovakia) I Lendl	6	6
7	(Switzerland) J Hlasek	3	4
4	(Czechoslovakia) M Mečíř	6	6
(Spain) S Casal	1	2

Semifinals
1	(Czechoslovakia) I Lendl	7	6
4	(Czechoslovakia) M Mečíř	5	4

=== Bottom half ===
First round
6	(Czechoslovakia) T Šmíd	2	3
(Israel) A Mansdorf	6	6
Q	(Israel) S Glickstein	4	2
(South Africa) C Steyn	6	6
(Italy) C Panatta	1	6
(Spain) E Sánchez	6	7
(Australia) M Edmondson	4	4
3	(Sweden) A Järryd	6	6
8	(Sweden) J Gunnarsson	6	6
(United States) M Flur	4	4
(United States) V Gerulaitis	6	6	5
(United States) B Green	7	3	7
(Romania) F Segărceanu	3	4
(Czechoslovakia) P Složil	6	6
(Sweden) J Svensson	3	2
2	(Sweden) J Nyström	6	6

Second round
(Israel) A Mansdorf	6	6
(South Africa) C Steyn	1	1
(Spain) E Sánchez	2	4
3	(Sweden) A Järryd	6	6
8	(Sweden) J Gunnarsson	0	2
(United States) B Green	6	6
(Czechoslovakia) P Složil	4	2
2	(Sweden) J Nyström	6	6

Quarterfinals
(Israel) A Mansdorf	6	5
3	(Sweden) A Järryd	7	7
(United States) B Green	1	6	2
2	(Sweden) J Nyström	6	4	6

Semifinals
3	(Sweden) A Järryd	3	6
2	(Sweden) J Nyström	6	7
