= 2005 Milan Indoor – Doubles =

Doubles
- 2005 Milan Indoor

Final
- Champions: (Italy) Daniele Bracciali (Italy) Giorgio Galimberti
- Runners-up: (France) Jean-François Bachelot (France) Arnaud Clément
- Score: 6–7^{(8–10)}, 7–6^{(8–6)}, 6–4

Details
- Draw: 16 (2WC)
- Seeds: 4

Events
Singles	Doubles
- Milan Indoor

Jared Palmer and Pavel Vízner were the defending champions, but Palmer did not compete this year. Vízner teamed up with Cyril Suk and lost in the first round to Jean-François Bachelot and Arnaud Clément.

Wild cards Daniele Bracciali and Giorgio Galimberti won the title by defeating Bachelot and Clément 6–7^{(8–10)}, 7–6^{(8–6)}, 6–4 in the final.

== Seeds ==
1. (France) Michaël Llodra / (France) Fabrice Santoro (first round, retired due to a shoulder injury on Santoro)
2. (Czech Republic) Cyril Suk / (Czech Republic) Pavel Vízner (first round)
3. (Czech Republic) Martin Damm / (Czech Republic) Radek Štěpánek (first round)
4. (Austria) Julian Knowle / (Czech Republic) Petr Pála (semifinals)

== Draw ==
Key

- Q = Qualifier
- WC = Wild card
- LL = Lucky loser
- Alt = Alternate
- ITF = ITF entry
- PR = Protected ranking
- SR = Special ranking
- SE = Special exempt
- JE = Junior exempt
- JR = Junior Accelerator Programme entrant
- CO = College Accelerator Programme entrant
- NG = Next Gen Accelerator Program entrant
- w/o = Walkover
- r = Retired
- d = Defaulted

=== Draw ===
First round
1	(France) M Llodra (France) F Santoro	3	r
(Croatia) I Ljubičić (Italy) U Vico	6
(Czech Republic) P Luxa (Belgium) C Rochus	3	4
(Slovakia) K Beck (Czech Republic) B Ulihrach	6	6
3	(Czech Republic) M Damm (Czech Republic) R Štěpánek	5	7	4
WC	(Italy) D Bracciali (Italy) G Galimberti	7	5	6
(Romania) A Pavel (Romania) G Trifu
(Croatia) I Karlović (Belgium) T Vanhoudt	w/o
(South Africa) C Haggard (South Africa) R Koenig	6	7^{7}
(Italy) M Bertolini (Luxembourg) G Müller	2	6^{5}
(Russia) I Andreev (Germany) R Schüttler	4	2
4	(Austria) J Knowle (Czech Republic) P Pála	6	6
(Switzerland) Y Allegro (Germany) M Kohlmann	4	6^{5}
WC	(Italy) D Sanguinetti (Italy) A Seppi	6	7^{7}
(France) JF Bachelot (France) A Clément	6	6
2	(Czech Republic) C Suk (Czech Republic) P Vízner	3	4

Quarterfinals
(Croatia) I Ljubičić (Italy) U Vico	7	6^{4}	6
(Slovakia) K Beck (Czech Republic) B Ulihrach	5	7^{7}	3
WC	(Italy) D Bracciali (Italy) G Galimberti	6	7
(Croatia) I Karlović (Belgium) T Vanhoudt	4	5
(South Africa) C Haggard (South Africa) R Koenig	6	3	6^{4}
4	(Austria) J Knowle (Czech Republic) P Pála	3	6	7^{7}
WC	(Italy) D Sanguinetti (Italy) A Seppi	4	6	6^{6}
(France) JF Bachelot (France) A Clément	6	3	7^{8}

Semifinals
(Croatia) I Ljubičić (Italy) U Vico	6	3	4
WC	(Italy) D Bracciali (Italy) G Galimberti	4	6	6
4	(Austria) J Knowle (Czech Republic) P Pála	3	6	5
(France) JF Bachelot (France) A Clément	6	3	7

Final
WC	(Italy) D Bracciali (Italy) G Galimberti	6^{8}	7^{8}	6
(France) JF Bachelot (France) A Clément	7^{10}	6^{6}	4
