= 2001 Milan Indoor =

- Date: 29 January – 4 February
- Edition: 24th
- Category: International Series
- Draw: 32S / 16D
- Prize money: $375,000
- Surface: Carpet / indoor
- Location: Milan, Italy
- Venue: PalaLido

Champions

Singles
- (Switzerland) Roger Federer

Doubles
- (Netherlands) Paul Haarhuis / (Netherlands) Sjeng Schalken
- Milan Indoor

The 2001 Milan Indoor was a men's tennis tournament played on indoor carpet courts at the PalaLido in Milan, Italy and was part of the International Series of the 2001 ATP Tour. It was the 24th edition of the tournament and ran from 29 January through 4 February 2001.

The singles field was headlined by World No. 1, US Open, Canada and Paris Masters champion Marat Safin, ATP No. 7, Sydney Olympics gold medalist, Moscow and two-time Milan champion Yevgeny Kafelnikov and Auckland champion Dominik Hrbatý. Other seeded players were Dubai and Hong Kong champion Nicolas Kiefer, St. Pölten champion Andrei Pavel, Sjeng Schalken, Roger Federer and Marc Rosset.

This tournament in 2001 was significant as it was the first title of Roger Federer's career.

== Finals ==
=== Singles ===
(Switzerland) Roger Federer defeated (France) Julien Boutter 6–4, 6–7^{(7–9)}, 6–4

- It was Federer's 1st singles title of the year and of his career.

=== Doubles ===
(Netherlands) Paul Haarhuis / (Netherlands) Sjeng Schalken defeated (Sweden) Johan Landsberg / (Belgium) Tom Vanhoudt 7–6^{(7–5)}, 7–6^{(7–4)}

- It was Haarhuis' 1st title of the year and the 52nd of his career. It was Schalken's 1st title of the year and the 9th of his career.
