= 1986 Milan Indoor =

- Date: 10–16 March
- Edition: 9th
- Category: Grand Prix
- Draw: 32S / 16D
- Prize money: $300,000
- Surface: Carpet / indoor
- Location: Milan, Italy
- Venue: PalaLido

Champions

Singles
- (Czechoslovakia) Ivan Lendl

Doubles
- (United Kingdom) Colin Dowdeswell / (South Africa) Christo Steyn
- Milan Indoor

The 1986 Milan Indoor (also known as the 1986 Fila Trophy for sponsorship reasons) was a men's tennis tournament played on indoor carpet courts. The event was part of the 1986 Nabisco Grand Prix. It was the ninth edition of the tournament and was played at the PalaLido in Milan, Italy from 10 March until 16 March 1986. First-seeded Ivan Lendl won the singles title, his second at the event after 1983, and earned $80,000 first-prize money.

== Finals ==
=== Singles ===
(Czechoslovakia) Ivan Lendl defeated (Sweden) Joakim Nyström 6–2, 6–2, 6–4

- It was Lendl's 3rd singles title of the year and the 56th of his career.

=== Doubles ===
(United Kingdom) Colin Dowdeswell / (South Africa) Christo Steyn defeated (South Africa) Brian Levine / (Australia) Laurie Warder 6–3, 4–6, 6–1
