= 1998 Guardian Direct Cup – Doubles =

Doubles
- 1998 Guardian Direct Cup

Final
- Champions: (Czech Republic) Martin Damm (United States) Jim Grabb
- Runners-up: (Russia) Yevgeny Kafelnikov (Czech Republic) Daniel Vacek
- Score: 6–4, 7–5

Details
- Draw: 16
- Seeds: 4

Events
| Singles | Doubles |
- Milan Indoor

The 1998 Guardian Direct Cup was a men's tennis tournament played on indoor carpet courts in London, Great Britain, that was part of the ATP Championship Series of the 1998 ATP Tour. It was the 21st edition of the tournament and was held 23 February – 1 March.

== Seeds ==
Champion seeds are indicated in bold text while text in italics indicates the round in which those seeds were eliminated.

1. (Russia) Yevgeny Kafelnikov / (Czech Republic) Daniel Vacek (final)
2. (United States) Patrick Galbraith / (New Zealand) Brett Steven (semifinals)
3. (Czech Republic) **Martin Damm / (United States) Jim Grabb (champions)**
4. (United Kingdom) Neil Broad / (South Africa) Piet Norval (first round)

== Draw ==
Key

- Q = Qualifier
- WC = Wild card
- LL = Lucky loser
- Alt = Alternate
- ITF = ITF entry
- PR = Protected ranking
- SR = Special ranking
- SE = Special exempt
- JE = Junior exempt
- JR = Junior Accelerator Programme entrant
- CO = College Accelerator Programme entrant
- NG = Next Gen Accelerator Program entrant
- w/o = Walkover
- r = Retired
- d = Defaulted

=== Finals ===
First round
1 | (Russia) **Y Kafelnikov** **(Czech Republic) D Vacek** | **6** | **6**
(South Africa) W Ferreira (United Kingdom) A Richardson | 4 | 4
(Croatia) **G Ivanišević** **(Croatia) I Ljubičić** | 2 | **6** | **7**
(Australia) A Kratzmann (Netherlands) F Wibier | **6** | 3 | 5
(Australia) **J Eagle** **(Australia) A Florent** | 4 | **6** | **6**
4 | (United Kingdom) N Broad (South Africa) P Norval | **6** | 2 | 3
(Netherlands) **T Kempers** **(Netherlands) M Oosting** | **6** | 3 | **7**
(Germany) M-K Goellner (Sweden) M Tillström | 3 | **6** | 6
(North Macedonia) **A Kitinov** **(Czech Republic) P Vízner** | 1 | **7** | **7**
(Argentina) P Albano (Sweden) P Nyborg | **6** | 6 | 6
3 | (Czech Republic) **M Damm** **(United States) J Grabb** | **7** | **7**
(United Kingdom) T Henman (Switzerland) M Rosset | 5 | 6
(South Africa) **D Adams** **(Belgium) L Pimek** | **6** | **6**
(South Africa) M Barnard (South Africa) B Talbot | 1 | 4
2 | (United States) **P Galbraith** **(New Zealand) B Steven** | **6** | **7**
(Spain) T Carbonell (Spain) F Roig | 1 | 6

Quarterfinals
1 | (Russia) **Y Kafelnikov** **(Czech Republic) D Vacek** | **6** | **6**
(Croatia) G Ivanišević (Croatia) I Ljubičić | 1 | 4
(Australia) **J Eagle** **(Australia) A Florent** | 6 | **6** | **7**
(Netherlands) T Kempers (Netherlands) M Oosting | **7** | 4 | 6
(North Macedonia) A Kitinov (Czech Republic) P Vízner | 3 | 5
3 | (Czech Republic) **M Damm** **(United States) J Grabb** | **6** | **7**
(South Africa) D Adams (Belgium) L Pimek | 2 | 4
2 | (United States) **P Galbraith** **(New Zealand) B Steven** | **6** | **6**

Semifinals
1 | (Russia) **Y Kafelnikov** **(Czech Republic) D Vacek** | **6** | 3 | **6**
(Australia) J Eagle (Australia) A Florent | 4 | **6** | 2
3 | (Czech Republic) **M Damm** **(United States) J Grabb** | 6 | **7** | **6**
2 | (United States) P Galbraith (New Zealand) B Steven | **7** | 5 | 3

Final
1 | (Russia) Y Kafelnikov (Czech Republic) D Vacek | 4 | 5
3 | (Czech Republic) **M Damm** **(United States) J Grabb** | **6** | **7**
