= 1999 Guardian Direct Cup – Doubles =

Tennis tournament

Doubles
- 1999 Guardian Direct Cup

Final
- Champions: (United Kingdom) Tim Henman (United Kingdom) Greg Rusedski
- Runners-up: (Zimbabwe) Byron Black (South Africa) Wayne Ferreira
- Score: 6–3, 7–6^{(8–6)}

Details
- Draw: 16
- Seeds: 4

Events
Singles	Doubles
- Milan Indoor

The 1999 Guardian Direct Cup was a men's tennis tournament played on indoor carpet courts in London, Great Britain, that was part of the Championship Series of the 1999 ATP Tour. It was the 22nd edition of the tournament and was held 22–28 February.

== Seeds ==
Champion seeds are indicated in bold text while text in italics indicates the round in which those seeds were eliminated.

1. (United States) Patrick Galbraith / (Netherlands) Paul Haarhuis (first round)
2. (Russia) Yevgeny Kafelnikov / (Czech Republic) Daniel Vacek (semifinals)
3. (Zimbabwe) Byron Black / (Australia) Sandon Stolle (first round)
4. (South Africa) Piet Norval / (South Africa) Kevin Ullyett (first round)

== Draw ==
Key

- Q = Qualifier
- WC = Wild card
- LL = Lucky loser
- Alt = Alternate
- ITF = ITF entry
- PR = Protected ranking
- SR = Special ranking
- SE = Special exempt
- JE = Junior exempt
- JR = Junior Accelerator Programme entrant
- CO = College Accelerator Programme entrant
- NG = Next Gen Accelerator Program entrant
- w/o = Walkover
- r = Retired
- d = Defaulted

=== Finals ===
First round
(Zimbabwe) **B Black** **(South Africa) W Ferreira**	2	**7**	**6**
1	(United States) P Galbraith (Netherlands) P Haarhuis	**6**	6	3
(Spain) **T Carbonell** **(South Africa) C Haggard**	**6**	**6**
(Sweden) P Nyborg (Czech Republic) P Vízner	4	3
(Australia) **J Eagle** **(Australia) A Florent**	6	**6**	**7**
3	(Zimbabwe) W Black (Australia) S Stolle	**7**	2	6
(South Africa) **D Adams** **(South Africa) J-L de Jager**	**7**	**6**
(Australia) W Arthurs (United States) J Tarango	5	4
(United Kingdom) **N Broad** **(South Africa) R Koenig**	**6**	4	**6**
(Czech Republic) C Suk (Australia) P Tramacchi	4	**6**	3
(United Kingdom) **T Henman** **(United Kingdom) G Rusedski**	**7**	**6**
4	(South Africa) P Norval (South Africa) K Ullyett	6	2
(Croatia) **G Ivanišević** **(Germany) N Kiefer**	**6**	5	**7**
(Germany) B Becker (Germany) D Prinosil	3	**7**	5
2	(Russia) **Y Kafelnikov** **(Czech Republic) D Vacek**	4	**6**	**7**
(Sweden) N Kulti (Australia) D Macpherson	**6**	3	6

Quarterfinals
(Zimbabwe) **B Black** **(South Africa) W Ferreira**	**6**	**6**
(Spain) T Carbonell (South Africa) C Haggard	4	2
(Australia) **J Eagle** **(Australia) A Florent**	**6**	**6**
(South Africa) D Adams (South Africa) J-L de Jager	1	4
(United Kingdom) N Broad (South Africa) R Koenig	4	4
(United Kingdom) **T Henman** **(United Kingdom) G Rusedski**	**6**	**6**
(Croatia) G Ivanišević (Germany) N Kiefer	2	1
2	(Russia) **Y Kafelnikov** **(Czech Republic) D Vacek**	**6**	**6**

Semifinals
(Zimbabwe) **B Black** **(South Africa) W Ferreira**	**7**	**7**
(Australia) J Eagle (Australia) A Florent	5	6
(United Kingdom) **T Henman** **(United Kingdom) G Rusedski**	**6**	**6**
2	(Russia) Y Kafelnikov (Czech Republic) D Vacek	4	4

Final
(Zimbabwe) B Black (South Africa) W Ferreira	3	6
(United Kingdom) **T Henman** **(United Kingdom) G Rusedski**	**6**	**7**
