= 2001 Milan Indoor – Singles =

Singles
- 2001 Milan Indoor

Final
- Champion: (Switzerland) Roger Federer
- Runner-up: (France) Julien Boutter
- Score: 6–4, 6–7^{(7–9)}, 6–4

Details
- Draw: 32 (4Q / 3WC)
- Seeds: 8

Events
Singles	Doubles
- Milan Indoor

Marc Rosset was the defending champion at the Milan Indoor tennis tournament but was forced to retire in his second round match against Greg Rusedski.

Roger Federer won in the final 6–4, 6–7^{(7–9)}, 6–4 against Julien Boutter. It was Federer's first title of the year and the first of his career.

== Seeds ==
A champion seed is indicated in bold text while text in italics indicates the round in which that seed was eliminated.

1. (Russia) Marat Safin (quarterfinals)
2. (Russia) Yevgeny Kafelnikov (semifinals)
3. (Slovakia) Dominik Hrbatý (first round)
4. (Germany) Nicolas Kiefer (first round)
5. (Romania) Andrei Pavel (first round)
6. (Netherlands) Sjeng Schalken (first round)
7. (Switzerland) **Roger Federer (champion)**
8. (Switzerland) Marc Rosset (second round, retired due to a lower back injury)

== Draw ==
Key

- Q = Qualifier
- WC = Wild card
- LL = Lucky loser
- Alt = Alternate
- ITF = ITF entry
- PR = Protected ranking
- SR = Special ranking
- SE = Special exempt
- JE = Junior exempt
- JR = Junior Accelerator Programme entrant
- CO = College Accelerator Programme entrant
- NG = Next Gen Accelerator Program entrant
- w/o = Walkover
- r = Retired
- d = Defaulted

First round
1	(Russia) **M Safin**	**6**	**7**
(Germany) D Prinosil	4	5
WC	(Italy) A Gaudenzi	5	2
Q	(Belgium) **X Malisse**	**7**	**6**
(Italy) G Pozzi	1	5
(United Kingdom) **G Rusedski**	**6**	**7**
(Croatia) I Ljubičić	**6**	6^{12}	4
8	(Switzerland) **M Rosset**	4	**7^{14}**	**6**
3	(Slovakia) D Hrbaty	**6**	5	3
(France) **F Santoro**	3	**7**	**6**
(France) **J Boutter**	**7^{7}**	**6**
(France) J Golmard	6^{5}	4
(Israel) H Levy	**6**	6^{3}	4
(Spain) **S Bruguera**	3	**7^{7}**	**6**
(United States) **J-M Gambill**	**6**	6^{3}	**6**
6	(Netherlands) S Schalken	1	**7^{7}**	2
7	(Switzerland) **R Federer**	**6**	**6**
(Germany) R Schüttler	3	4
Q	(France) **C Saulnier**	**7^{8}**	**6**
(Italy) D Sanguinetti	6^{6}	4
(Czech Republic) **B Ulihrach**	**7**	6^{7}	**7**
(France) N Escudé	5	**7^{9}**	5
WC	(Croatia) **G Ivanišević**	2	**6**	**6**
WC/4	(Germany) N Kiefer	**6**	2	3
5	(Romania) A Pavel	6^{6}	**6**	6^{5}
(Ukraine) **A Medvedev**	**7^{8}**	2	**7^{7}**
(Czech Republic) J Vaněk	4	**6**	6^{1}
(Belarus) **V Voltchkov**	**6**	1	**7^{7}**
(Czech Republic) C Doseděl	2	6^{4}
Q	(Switzerland) **I Heuberger**	**6**	**7^{7}**
Q	(United States) J Tarango	**6**	4	2
2	(Russia) **Y Kafelnikov**	4	**6**	**6**

Second round
1	(Russia) **M Safin**	3	**6**	**7**
Q	(Belgium) X Malisse	**6**	3	5
(United Kingdom) **G Rusedski**	**6**	1
8	(Switzerland) M Rosset	3	0^{r}
(France) F Santoro	6^{4}	4
(France) **J Boutter**	**7^{7}**	**6**
(Spain) S Bruguera	3	5
(United States) **J-M Gambill**	**6**	**7**
7	(Switzerland) **R Federer**	2	**6**	**6**
Q	(France) C Saulnier	**6**	3	4
(Czech Republic) B Ulihrach
WC	(Croatia) **G Ivanišević**	w/o
(Ukraine) A Medvedev	2	5
(Belarus) **V Voltchkov**	**6**	**7**
Q	(Switzerland) I Heuberger	2	3
2	(Russia) **Y Kafelnikov**	**6**	**6**

Quarterfinals
1	(Russia) M Safin	0	6^{5}
(United Kingdom) **G Rusedski**	**6**	**7^{7}**
(France) **J Boutter**	**6**	**6**
(United States) J-M Gambill	4	4
7	(Switzerland) **R Federer**	**6**	**6**
WC	(Croatia) G Ivanišević	4	4
(Belarus) V Voltchkov	4	3
2	(Russia) **Y Kafelnikov**	**6**	**6**

Semifinals
(United Kingdom) G Rusedski	6^{5}	6^{3}
(France) **J Boutter**	**7^{7}**	**7^{7}**
7	(Switzerland) **R Federer**	**6**	6^{4}	**6**
2	(Russia) Y Kafelnikov	2	**7^{7}**	3

Final
(France) Julien Boutter	4	**7^{9}**	4
7	(Switzerland) **Roger Federer**	**6**	6^{7}	**6**

== Qualifying ==
=== Qualifying seeds ===
1. (Sweden) Magnus Gustafsson (qualifying competition)
2. (Switzerland) Michel Kratochvil (first round)
3. (Switzerland) George Bastl (qualifying competition)
4. (Spain) Tommy Robredo (qualifying competition)
5. (United States) **Jeff Tarango (qualified)**
6. (France) **Cyril Saulnier (qualified)**
7. (Belgium) **Xavier Malisse (qualified)**
8. (France) Nicolas Thomann (second round)

=== Qualifiers ===
1. (France) **Cyril Saulnier**
2. (Switzerland) **Ivo Heuberger**
3. (United States) **Jeff Tarango**
4. (Belgium) **Xavier Malisse**

=== Qualifying draw ===
==== First qualifier ====
First round
1	**(Sweden) Magnus Gustafsson**	**6**	**7**
(Hungary) Attila Sávolt	2	5
**(Italy) Stefano Galvani**	**6**	**6**
(Germany) Björn Phau	4	1
(Spain) Óscar Burrieza	4	**6**	1
**(Italy) Renzo Furlan**	**6**	3	**6**
WC	(Italy) Francesco Aldi	1	5
6	**(France) Cyril Saulnier**	**6**	**7**

Second round
1	**(Sweden) Magnus Gustafsson**	5	**6**	**6**
(Italy) Stefano Galvani	**7**	1	4
(Italy) Renzo Furlan	2	3
6	**(France) Cyril Saulnier**	**6**	**6**

Qualifying competition
1	(Sweden) Magnus Gustafsson	**7^{7}**	2	6^{4}
6	**(France) Cyril Saulnier**	6^{2}	**6**	**7^{7}**

==== Second qualifier ====
First round
2	(Switzerland) Michel Kratochvil	4	2
**(Italy) Marzio Martelli**	**6**	**6**
(France) Lionel Roux	3	2
**(France) Jean-René Lisnard**	**6**	**6**
WC	(Italy) Daniele Bracciali	3	1
**(Switzerland) Ivo Heuberger**	**6**	**6**
(Italy) Federico Luzzi	4	4
8	**(France) Nicolas Thomann**	**6**	**6**

Second round
(Italy) Marzio Martelli	5	**6**	3
**(France) Jean-René Lisnard**	**7**	1	**6**
**(Switzerland) Ivo Heuberger**	**6**	**6**
8	(France) Nicolas Thomann	4	1

Qualifying competition
(France) Jean-René Lisnard	1^{r}
**(Switzerland) Ivo Heuberger**	4

==== Third qualifier ====
First round
3	**(Switzerland) George Bastl**	w/o
(Italy) Stefano Tarallo
WC	**(Italy) Uros Vico**	w/o
(Italy) Filippo Volandri
**(Italy) Mosé Navarra**	4	**7**	**7^{7}**
(Belgium) Johan Van Herck	**6**	5	6^{3}
WC	(Italy) Stefano Pescosolido	5	4
5	**(United States) Jeff Tarango**	**7**	**6**

Second round
3	**(Switzerland) George Bastl**	**6**	**6**
WC	(Italy) Uros Vico	3	2
(Italy) Mosé Navarra	6^{4}	3
5	**(United States) Jeff Tarango**	**7^{7}**	**6**

Qualifying competition
3	(Switzerland) George Bastl	**6**	3	4
5	**(United States) Jeff Tarango**	2	**6**	**6**

==== Fourth qualifier ====
First round
4	**(Spain) Tommy Robredo**	**7**	1	**6**
(Belgium) Filip Dewulf	5	**6**	2
(Romania) Răzvan Sabău	5	2^{r}
**(Russia) Andrei Cherkasov**	**7**	5
(Australia) Michael Hill	5	**6**	4
**(Israel) Noam Okun**	**7**	3	**6**
(Russia) Igor Kunitsyn	5	2
7	**(Belgium) Xavier Malisse**	**7**	**6**

Second round
4	**(Spain) Tommy Robredo**	**7^{7}**	**6**
(Russia) Andrei Cherkasov	6^{5}	4
(Israel) Noam Okun	3	2
7	**(Belgium) Xavier Malisse**	**6**	**6**

Qualifying competition
4	(Spain) Tommy Robredo	3	3
7	**(Belgium) Xavier Malisse**	**6**	**6**
