= 2005 Milan Indoor – Singles =

Singles
- 2005 Milan Indoor

Final
- Champion: (Sweden) Robin Söderling
- Runner-up: (Czech Republic) Radek Štěpánek
- Score: 6–3, 6–7^{(2–7)}, 7–6^{(7–5)}

Details
- Draw: 32 (4Q / 3WC)
- Seeds: 8

Events
Singles	Doubles
- Milan Indoor

Antony Dupuis was the defending champion but did not participate.

Robin Söderling won the title defeating Radek Štěpánek 6–3, 6–7^{(2–7)}, 7–6^{(7–5)} in the final.

== Seeds ==
A champion seed is indicated in bold text while text in italics indicates the round in which that seed was eliminated.

1. (Romania) Andrei Pavel (second round)
2. (Croatia) Ivan Ljubičić (semifinals)
3. (Croatia) Mario Ančić (second round)
4. (Czech Republic) Radek Štěpánek (final)
5. (Sweden) **Robin Söderling (champion)**
6. (Germany) Rainer Schüttler (quarterfinals)
7. (Slovakia) Karol Beck (quarterfinals)
8. (Belarus) Max Mirnyi (semifinals)

== Draw ==
Key

- Q = Qualifier
- WC = Wild card
- LL = Lucky loser
- Alt = Alternate
- ITF = ITF entry
- PR = Protected ranking
- SR = Special ranking
- SE = Special exempt
- JE = Junior exempt
- JR = Junior Accelerator Programme entrant
- CO = College Accelerator Programme entrant
- NG = Next Gen Accelerator Program entrant
- w/o = Walkover
- r = Retired
- d = Defaulted

=== Finals ===
Semifinals
8	(Belarus) Max Mirnyi	**7^{7}**	3	4
5	**(Sweden) Robin Söderling**	6^{5}	**6**	**6**
4	**(Czech Republic) Radek Štěpánek**	**6**	**6**
2	(Croatia) Ivan Ljubičić	4	2

Final
5	**(Sweden) Robin Söderling**	**6**	6^{2}	**7^{7}**
4	(Czech Republic) Radek Štěpánek	3	**7^{7}**	6^{5}

=== Top half ===
First round
1/WC	**(Romania) A Pavel**	**7^{7}**	6^{5}	**7^{7}**
(France) G Carraz	6^{0}	**7^{7}**	6^{3}
(Russia) I Andreev	4	**7**	2
**(Germany) T Behrend**	**6**	5	**6**
**(Luxembourg) G Müller**	**7^{7}**	**7**
(France) M Llodra	6^{5}	5
(Italy) F Aldi	3	6^{5}
8	**(Belarus) M Mirnyi**	**6**	**7^{7}**
3	**(Croatia) M Ančić**	**6**	**7**
(Czech Republic) B Ulihrach	4	5
(Belgium) C Rochus	2	3
Q	**(Ukraine) S Stakhovsky**	**6**	**6**
(France) J Benneteau	3	3
WC	**(France) G Monfils**	**6**	**6**
(France) A Clément	1	**7^{7}**	4
5	**(Sweden) R Söderling**	**6**	6^{3}	**6**

Second round
1/WC	(Romania) A Pavel	5	6^{3}
**(Germany) T Behrend**	**7**	**7^{7}**
(Luxembourg) G Müller	6^{1}	6^{4}
8	**(Belarus) M Mirnyi**	**7^{7}**	**7^{7}**
3	(Croatia) M Ančić	4	**6**	6^{3}
Q	**(Ukraine) S Stakhovsky**	**6**	4	**7^{7}**
WC	(France) G Monfils	3	4
5	**(Sweden) R Söderling**	**6**	**6**

Quarterfinals
(Germany) T Behrend	3	2
8	**(Belarus) M Mirnyi**	**6**	**6**
Q	(Ukraine) S Stakhovsky	3	2
5	**(Sweden) R Söderling**	**6**	**6**

Semifinals
8	(Belarus) M Mirnyi	**7^{7}**	3	4
5	**(Sweden) R Söderling**	6^{5}	**6**	**6**

=== Bottom half ===
First round
6	**(Germany) R Schüttler**	**6**	**6**
(Italy) D Sanguinetti	3	4
(Sweden) J Björkman	2	2
**(Netherlands) S Schalken**	**6**	**6**
**(Croatia) I Karlović**	6^{5}	**6**	**7^{7}**
LL	(United Kingdom) A Mackin	**7^{7}**	3	6^{3}
Q	(Italy) D Bracciali	6^{3}	4
4	**(Czech Republic) R Štěpánek**	**7^{7}**	**6**
7	**(Slovakia) K Beck**	**6**	**6**
(Romania) V Hănescu	4	4
Q	(Italy) U Vico	2	6^{3}
WC	**(Italy) A Seppi**	**6**	**7^{7}**
Q	(Italy) G Galimberti	**6**	3	6^{4}
**(Switzerland) I Heuberger**	4	**6**	**7^{7}**
(Sweden) T Enqvist	5	3
2	**(Croatia) I Ljubičić**	**7**	**6**

Second round
6	**(Germany) R Schüttler**	**6**	**6**
(Netherlands) S Schalken	3	4
(Croatia) I Karlović	6^{7}	**6**	6^{5}
4	**(Czech Republic) R Štěpánek**	**7^{9}**	4	**7^{7}**
7	**(Slovakia) K Beck**	**7**	4	**6**
WC	(Italy) A Seppi	5	**6**	3
(Switzerland) I Heuberger	1	2
2	**(Croatia) I Ljubičić**	**6**	**6**

Quarterfinals
6	(Germany) R Schüttler	6^{4}	**6**	3
4	**(Czech Republic) R Štěpánek**	**7^{7}**	4	**6**
7	(Slovakia) K Beck	**7^{7}**	0	2
2	**(Croatia) I Ljubičić**	6^{4}	**6**	**6**

Semifinals
4	**(Czech Republic) R Štěpánek**	**6**	**6**
2	(Croatia) I Ljubičić	4	2
