= 1998 Guardian Direct Cup – Singles =

Singles
- 1998 Guardian Direct Cup

Final
- Champion: (Russia) Yevgeny Kafelnikov
- Runner-up: (France) Cédric Pioline
- Score: 7–5, 6–4

Details
- Draw: 32
- Seeds: 8

Events
Singles	Doubles
- Milan Indoor

The 1998 Guardian Direct Cup was a men's tennis tournament played on indoor carpet courts in London, Great Britain, that was part of the International Series Gold of the 1998 ATP Tour. It was the 21st edition of the tournament and was held 23 February – 1 March.

== Seeds ==
Champion seeds are indicated in bold text while text in italics indicates the round in which those seeds were eliminated.

1. (Czech Republic) Petr Korda (second round)
2. (Australia) Patrick Rafter (quarterfinals)
3. (Russia) **Yevgeny Kafelnikov (champion)**
4. (United Kingdom) Greg Rusedski (first round)
5. (Netherlands) Richard Krajicek (first round)
6. (Spain) Sergi Bruguera (first round)
7. (Slovakia) Karol Kučera (quarterfinals)
8. (Croatia) Goran Ivanišević (second round)

== Draw ==
Key

- Q = Qualifier
- WC = Wild card
- LL = Lucky loser
- Alt = Alternate
- ITF = ITF entry
- PR = Protected ranking
- SR = Special ranking
- SE = Special exempt
- JE = Junior exempt
- JR = Junior Accelerator Programme entrant
- CO = College Accelerator Programme entrant
- NG = Next Gen Accelerator Program entrant
- w/o = Walkover
- r = Retired
- d = Defaulted

=== Finals ===
Semifinals
**(France) Cédric Pioline**	**6**	**7**
(Netherlands) Jan Siemerink	3	6^{4}
3	**(Russia) Yevgeny Kafelnikov**	**7**	**6**
(South Africa) Wayne Ferreira	5	4

Final
3	**(Russia) Yevgeny Kafelnikov**	**7**	**6**
(France) Cédric Pioline	5	4

=== Top half ===
First round
1	**(Czech Republic) P Korda**	**7**	6^{2}	**6**
(Germany) D Prinosil	6^{4}	**7**	4
**(France) C Pioline**	**6**	**7**
(Spain) F Clavet	1	6^{5}
**(Belgium) F Dewulf**	**6**	**7**
(Spain) G Blanco	2	5
7	**(Slovakia) K Kučera**	6^{2}	**7**	**6**
(France) G Raoux	**7**	6^{6}	4
**(Germany) M-K Goellner**	5	**7**	**6**
4	(United Kingdom) G Rusedski	**7**	5	4
**(United Kingdom) A Richardson**	**6**	2
(Switzerland) M Rosset	3	1	R
**(Czech Republic) B Ulihrach**	**6**	**7**
(United Kingdom) M Lee	4	6^{4}
**(Netherlands) J Siemerink**	**6**	**7**
6	(Spain) S Bruguera	1	6^{3}

Second round
1	(Czech Republic) P Korda	3	3
**(France) C Pioline**	**6**	**6**
(Belgium) F Dewulf	3	4
7	**(Slovakia) K Kučera**	**6**	**6**
**(Germany) M-K Goellner**	**6**	6^{4}	**7**
(United Kingdom) A Richardson	4	**7**	5
(Czech Republic) B Ulihrach	3	**7**	4
**(Netherlands) J Siemerink**	**6**	6^{4}	**6**

Quarterfinals
**(France) C Pioline**	**6**	4	**6**
7	(Slovakia) K Kučera	3	**6**	2
(Germany) M-K Goellner	3	4
**(Netherlands) J Siemerink**	**6**	**6**

Semifinals
**(France) C Pioline**	**6**	**7**
(Netherlands) J Siemerink	3	6^{4}

=== Bottom half ===
First round
**(United Kingdom) T Henman**	6^{5}	**7**	**7**
5	(Netherlands) R Krajicek	**7**	6^{2}	5
**(Germany) R Schüttler**	**7**	**7**
(Czech Republic) M Damm	5	6^{3}
**(Czech Republic) D Vacek**	**7**	**6**
(Morocco) K Alami	6^{5}	4
3	**(Russia) Y Kafelnikov**	**6**	**6**
(Sweden) T Johansson	3	2
8	**(Croatia) G Ivanišević**	**6**	**6**
(Denmark) K Carlsen	1	2
**(South Africa) W Ferreira**	6^{5}	**6**	**6**
(United Kingdom) C Wilkinson	**7**	4	2
**(Sweden) M Gustafsson**	6^{3}	**7**	**6**
(New Zealand) B Steven	**7**	6^{3}	2
2	**(Australia) P Rafter**	**6**	3	**6**
(Morocco) H Arazi	3	**6**	3

Second round
**(United Kingdom) T Henman**	4	**6**	**6**
(Germany) R Schüttler	**6**	3	4
(Czech Republic) D Vacek	3	4
3	**(Russia) Y Kafelnikov**	**6**	**6**
8	(Croatia) G Ivanišević	2	4
**(South Africa) W Ferreira**	**6**	**6**
(Sweden) M Gustafsson	3	6^{6}'
2	**(Australia) P Rafter**	**6**	**7**

Quarterfinals
(United Kingdom) T Henman	**6**	4	2
3	**(Russia) Y Kafelnikov**	4	**6**	**6**
**(South Africa) W Ferreira**	**6**	**6**
2	(Australia) P Rafter	4	4

Semifinals
3	**(Russia) Y Kafelnikov**	**7**	**6**
(South Africa) W Ferreira	5	4
