= 1998 Guardian Direct Cup =

- Date: 23 February – 1 March
- Edition: 21st
- Category: Championship Series
- Draw: 32S / 16D
- Prize money: $689,250
- Surface: Carpet / indoor
- Location: London, Great Britain
- Venue: Battersea Park

Champions

Singles
- (Russia) Yevgeny Kafelnikov

Doubles
- (Czech Republic) Martin Damm / (United States) Jim Grabb
- Milan Indoor

The 1998 Guardian Direct Cup was a men's tennis tournament played on indoor carpet courts at the Battersea Park in London, Great Britain, that was part of the Championship Series of the 1998 ATP Tour. It was the 21st edition of the tournament, the first one held in London, England, and was held from 23 February until 1 March 1998. Third-seeded Yevgeny Kafelnikov won the singles title.

== Finals ==
=== Singles ===
- (Russia) Yevgeny Kafelnikov defeated (France) Cédric Pioline, 7–5, 6–4
- It was Kafelnikov's 1st singles title of the year and the 15th of his career.

=== Doubles ===
- (Czech Republic) Martin Damm / (United States) Jim Grabb defeated (Russia) Yevgeny Kafelnikov / (Czech Republic) Daniel Vacek, 6–4, 7–5
