= 2000 Axa Cup =

2000 AXA Cup
- Date: 21–27 February
- Edition: 23rd
- Category: International Series Gold
- Draw: 32S / 16D
- Prize money: £500,000
- Surface: Hard / indoor
- Location: London, England
- Venue: London Arena

Champions

Singles
- (Switzerland) Marc Rosset

Doubles
- (South Africa) David Adams (South Africa) John-Laffnie De Jager
- Milan Indoor

The 2000 AXA Cup was a men's tennis tournament played on indoor hard courts at the London Arena in London, England and was part of the International Series Gold of the 2000 ATP Tour. It was the 23rd edition of the tournament, the third and final one held in London, England, and ran from February 21 through February 27, 2000. Unseeded Marc Rosset won the singles title. The centre court surface, which was laid on wooden boards on top of an ice rink, was re-laid during the tournament after Yevgeny Kafelnikov complained it was dangerous.

== Finals ==
=== Singles ===
(Switzerland) Marc Rosset defeated (Russia) Yevgeny Kafelnikov 6–4, 6–4

- It was Rosset's 2nd singles title of the year and the 15th and the last of his career.

=== Doubles ===
(South Africa) David Adams / (South Africa) John-Laffnie De Jager defeated (United States) Jan-Michael Gambill / (United States) Scott Humphries 6–3, 6–7^{(7–9)}, 7–6^{(13–11)}

- It was Adams' 2nd title of the year and the 15th of his career. It was Humphries' 2nd title of the year and the 6th of his career.
