= 2002 Milan Indoor =

- Date: 28 January – 3 February
- Edition: 25th
- Category: International Series
- Draw: 32S / 16D
- Surface: Carpet / indoor
- Location: Milan, Italy
- Venue: PalaLido

Champions

Singles
- (Italy) Davide Sanguinetti

Doubles
- (Netherlands) Paul Haarhuis / (Netherlands) Sjeng Schalken
- Milan Indoor

The 2002 Milan Indoor was a men's tennis tournament played on indoor carpet courts at the PalaLido in Milan, Italy and was part of the International Series of the 2002 ATP Tour. It was the 25th edition of the tournament and ran from 28 January through 3 February 2002. Unseeded Davide Sanguinetti won the singles title.

== Finals ==
=== Singles ===
(Italy) Davide Sanguinetti defeated (Switzerland) Roger Federer 7–6^{(7–2)}, 4–6, 6–1

- It was Sanguinetti's 1st title of the year and the 2nd of his career.

=== Doubles ===
(Germany) Karsten Braasch / (Russia) Andrei Olhovskiy defeated (France) Julien Boutter / (Belarus) Max Mirnyi 3–6, 7–6^{(7–5)}, [12–10]

- It was Braasch's 1st title of the year and the 4th of his career. It was Olhovskiy's 1st title of the year and the 21st of his career.
