= 2004 Milan Indoor =

Tennis tournament

2004 Indesit ATP Milan Indoor
- Date: 9–15 February
- Edition: 27th
- Category: International Series
- Draw: 32S / 16D
- Prize money: €375,750
- Surface: Carpet / indoor
- Location: Milan, Italy
- Venue: PalaLido

Champions

Singles
- (France) Antony Dupuis

Doubles
- (United States) Jared Palmer / (Czech Republic) Pavel Vízner
- Milan Indoor

The 2004 Indesit ATP Milan Indoor was a men's tennis tournament played on indoor carpet courts at the PalaLido in Milan, Italy and was part of the International Series of the 2004 ATP Tour. It was the 27th edition of the tournament and took place from 9 February through 15 February 2004. Unseeded Antony Dupuis won the singles title.

== Finals ==
=== Singles ===
(France) Antony Dupuis defeated (Croatia) Mario Ančić 6–4, 6–7^{(12–14)}, 7–6^{(7–5)}

- It was Dupuis' 1st title of the year and the 1st of his career.

=== Doubles ===
(United States) Jared Palmer / (Czech Republic) Pavel Vízner defeated (Italy) Daniele Bracciali / (Italy) Giorgio Galimberti 6–4, 6–4

- It was Palmer's 1st title of the year and the 27th of his career. It was Vízner's 1st title of the year and the 6th of his career.
