= 2005 Milan Indoor =

- Date: 31 January – 6 February
- Edition: 28th
- Category: International Series
- Draw: 32S / 16D
- Prize money: $355,000
- Surface: Carpet / indoors
- Location: Milan, Italy
- Venue: PalaLido

Champions

Singles
- (Sweden) Robin Söderling

Doubles
- (Italy) Daniele Bracciali (Italy) Giorgio Galimberti
- Milan Indoor

The 2005 ATP Milan Indoor was a men's tennis tournament played on indoor carpet courts at the PalaLido in Milan, Italy and was part of the International Series of the 2005 ATP Tour. It was the 28th and last edition of the tournament ran from 31 January through 6 February 2005. Fifth-seeded Robin Söderling won the singles title.

== Finals ==
=== Singles ===
(Sweden) Robin Söderling defeated (Czech Republic) Radek Štěpánek, 6–3, 6–7^{(2–7)}, 7–6^{(7–5)}

- It was Söderling's 1st singles title of the year and the 2nd of his career.

=== Doubles ===
(Italy) Daniele Bracciali / (Italy) Giorgio Galimberti defeated (France) Jean-François Bachelot / (France) Arnaud Clément, 6–7^{(8–10)}, 7–6^{(8–6)}, 6–4
