= 2003 Breil Milano Indoor =

- Date: 27 January – 2 February
- Edition: 26th
- Category: International Series
- Draw: 32S / 16D
- Prize money: $355,000
- Surface: Carpet / indoor
- Location: Milan, Italy
- Venue: PalaLido

Champions

Singles
- (Netherlands) Martin Verkerk

Doubles
- (Czech Republic) Petr Luxa / (Czech Republic) Radek Štěpánek
- Milan Indoor

The 2003 Breil Milano Indoor was a men's tennis tournament played on indoor carpet courts at the PalaLido in Milan in Italy and was part of the International Series of the 2003 ATP Tour. The tournament ran from 27 January through 2 February 2003. Martin Verkerk won the singles title.

== Finals ==
=== Singles ===
(Netherlands) Martin Verkerk defeated (Russia) Yevgeny Kafelnikov 6–4, 5–7, 7–5

- It was Verkerk first singles title of his career.

=== Doubles ===
(Czech Republic) Petr Luxa / (Czech Republic) Radek Štěpánek defeated (Czech Republic) Tomáš Cibulec / (Czech Republic) Pavel Vízner 6–4, 7–6^{(7–4)}

- It was Luxa's only title of the year and the 3rd of his career. It was Štěpánek's only title of the year and the 6th of his career.
