= Greg Rusedski =

British tennis player (born 1973)

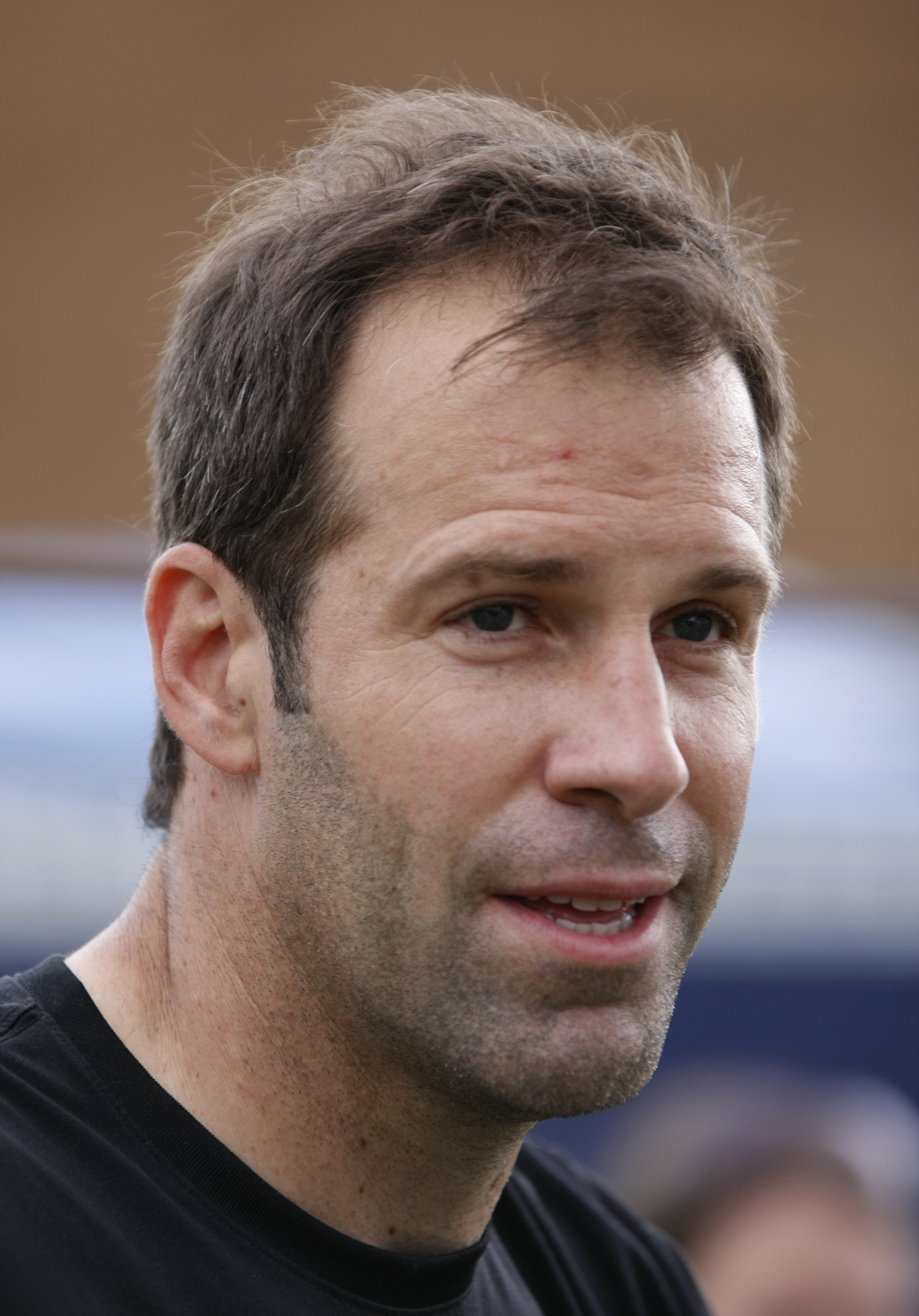
- Rusedski in 2014
- Country (sports): (United Kingdom) Great Britain (1995–2007); Canada (1991–1995)
- Residence: London, England
- Born: 6 September 1973 (age 53) Montreal, Quebec, Canada
- Height: 6 ft 4 in (1.93 m)
- Turned pro: 1991
- Retired: 7 April 2007
- Plays: Left-handed (one-handed backhand)
- Prize money: $8,944,841

Singles
- Career record: 436–287 (60.3%)
- Career titles: 15
- Highest ranking: No. 4 (6 October 1997)

Grand Slam singles results
- Australian Open: 4R (2001)
- French Open: 4R (1999)
- Wimbledon: QF (1997)
- US Open: F (1997)

Other tournaments
- Tour Finals: RR (1997, 1998)
- Grand Slam Cup: W (1999)
- Olympic Games: 3R (1996)

Doubles
- Career record: 62–53 (53.9%)
- Career titles: 3
- Highest ranking: No. 63 (19 June 1995)

Grand Slam doubles results
- Australian Open: 2R (1995)
- French Open: 1R (2006)
- Wimbledon: 2R (1994)
- US Open: 2R (1994)

Team competitions
- Davis Cup: World Group 1R (1999, 2002)

Gregory Rusedski (born 6 September 1973) is a Canadian-British former professional tennis player. He was the British No. 1 in 1997, 1999 and 2006, and reached the ATP ranking of world No. 4 for periods from 6 October 1997 to 12 October 1997 and from 25 May 1998 to 21 June 1998.

In 1997, he was a US Open finalist, which led to him receiving the BBC Sports Personality of the Year Award and the ITV Sports Champion of the Year Award. Also, he scored 30 wins and 13 losses with the Great Britain Davis Cup team. Along with erstwhile rival and teammate Tim Henman, Rusedski was credited with beginning a renaissance in British men's singles tennis from the doldrums of the eighties and nineties, reaching a grand slam final and returning Great Britain to relevance in the Davis Cup, progress that would eventually be brought to fruition by Andy Murray.

== Personal life ==
Rusedski was born in Montreal, Quebec, Canada, to a British mother and a Canadian father of Polish and Ukrainian descent. His parents made financial sacrifices to support his early tennis career over that of his older brother. Rusedski later recalled: "They remortgaged their house three times so I could travel and take part in tournaments... It must have been an incredibly hard decision for them."

He was a very promising junior player in Canada in the 1980s, and subsequently caused some anger in Canada when he decided to adopt British citizenship and play for Great Britain in 1995. When he returned to his hometown of Montreal to play in the 1995 Canadian Open, he was booed and taunted. Commenting on the hostile reception, Rusedski stated: "It didn't hurt my feelings... I thought I'd get a difficult reaction. I prepared for it and I expected it." Rusedski made the decision for "lifestyle reasons", noting that his girlfriend — who later became his wife — lived in Britain.

Rusedski has been with his wife Lucy Connor since 1991, they met while he was competing in a junior tournament where she was a ball girl. They married in a Catholic ceremony at Douai Abbey in West Berkshire , England,in December 1999. They have two children: a daughter born in 2006, and a son born in 2009.

== Career ==
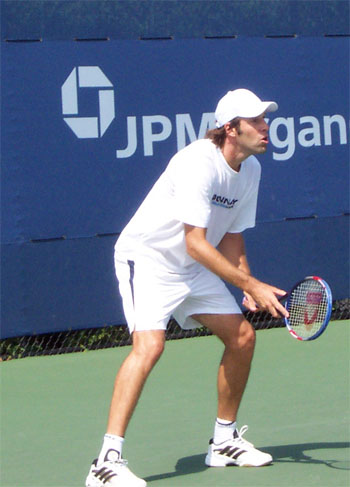
Rusedski at the 2004 US Open

Rusedski's first career singles tournament title was at the Hall of Fame Championship in Newport, Rhode Island in 1993. He opted to compete for the United Kingdom rather than Canada from 22 May 1995 onwards, a decision which was received poorly by Canadian fans; it was reported that he was given a "traitor's reception" by the crowd when he competed in his first Canadian Open after the switch.

In May 1996, Rusedski hired former Australian Open champion Brian Teacher as his coach, saying: "I want Brian to work on my return of serve... plus improve my backhand ... Brian understands the mental aspect of being in a Grand Slam." Teacher also focused on Rusedski integrating a comprehensive net game to go along with his powerful serve, refining his chip-and-charge tactics, and improving his balance. Over a 14-month span, Rusedski surged from world No. 85, entering the top ten of the ATP Rankings for the first time on 15 September 1997. In 1997 Teacher coached Rusedski to the quarter-finals at Wimbledon, and his first Grand Slam singles final at the U.S. Open, where Rusedski had not won a single match in his three prior visits.

At the singles final of the 1997 US Open, he lost to Pat Rafter in four sets (shortly thereafter reaching his career-high rank of world No. 4). He also won the BBC Sports Personality of the Year Award and the ITV Sports Champion of the Year Award. In 1998, Tim Henman eclipsed Rusedski as the UK number one tennis player. Rusedski, however, won the Grand Slam Cup in 1999.

In the 1999 US Open, Rusedski reached the fourth round where he was eliminated in five sets by Todd Martin; Rusedski had a two-sets-to-none advantage and was serving for the match in the third set, then in the fifth set he was up 4–1, but lost 20 of the final 21 points including a stretch of 18 consecutive points.

In the 2002 US Open, after losing to Pete Sampras in the third round in a grueling five-set match, Rusedski described Sampras as "a half-step slow" and predicted that Sampras would lose his fourth-round match to young German star Tommy Haas. Sampras, however, went on to win the tournament.

At Wimbledon in 2003, Rusedski was playing in a second-round match against Andy Roddick. Roddick had won the first two sets, but Rusedski was 5–2 up in the third set. During a point on Roddick's service game, a member of the crowd loudly called one of Roddick's shots long, causing Rusedski to stop playing the point as he believed it was a line judge. The umpire ruled that the ball was good and that, as Roddick's next shot landed in court, Roddick was awarded the point. Rusedski, believing the point should have been replayed, launched into a long and expletive-riddled tirade at the umpire and, never regaining his composure, went on to lose the next five games without reply to concede the match. Rusedski apologized after the match, and Roddick reached the semifinals.

Rusedski tested positive for nandrolone, an anabolic steroid, in January 2004, but he was cleared of the charges in a hearing on 10 March 2004.

Rusedski was defeated in the second round of Wimbledon in 2005 by Joachim Johansson of Sweden. Later that year, he defended his title at the Hall of Fame Championship, defeating Vince Spadea in the final. This was the first time he had successfully defended a title and the third time he had won the championship. He then reached the semifinals at both the RCA Championships in Indianapolis, losing to Taylor Dent, and the Canada Masters tournament in Montreal, losing to Andre Agassi.

Towards the end of 2005, Rusedski's ranking had risen to the high 30s. A defeat for Rusedski in the first round of the Challenger event in Dnipropetrovsk, Ukraine, left him ranked 38th, just one place short of regaining the UK top spot. Rusedski reclaimed the UK number-one spot on 15 May 2006, overtaking Andy Murray by getting to the third round of the Rome Masters. He lost the top UK ranking again after a first-round exit at Wimbledon.

On 7 April 2007, Rusedski officially retired from tennis after partnering with Jamie Murray to a doubles victory over the Netherlands in a Davis Cup match, a result which gave Great Britain a winning 3–0 lead in the tie. He announced his retirement immediately after the win during a live interview with Sue Barker on BBC Television. Rusedski has stayed involved with professional tennis in his retirement, and currently works for the Lawn Tennis Association as a talent and performance ambassador. Rusedski held the record for fastest serve at 149 miles per hour until Andy Roddick broke it.

On 24 January 2009, Rusedski confirmed he had been seeking a return to professional tennis. However, Davis Cup captain John Lloyd turned down his offer to compete in the Davis Cup, and Rusedski was unable to obtain any wild-card tournament entries. Because of this, Rusedski quickly retracted his announcement and is still retired.

Rusedski was often overshadowed in the British press by Tim Henman, especially at Wimbledon.

== Media career ==
Rusedski has an active media career, having written columns for The Sun, The Daily Mirror and The Daily Telegraph. He also works for the television channel British Eurosport providing analysis during the stations' coverage of the Australian Open. He provided commentary and analysis for Sky Sports for their coverage of the US Open and ATP World Tour Events, and for the BBC's coverage of Wimbledon. He has done some acting, appearing in an episode of Agatha Christie's Marple as a tennis player. In 2008, he appeared as a contestant on the reality TV shows Dancing on Ice and Beat the Star. He has appeared in "Dictionary Corner" on the Channel 4 game show Countdown.

== Grand Slam tournament finals ==
=== Singles: 1 (0–1) ===
Result	Year	Championship	Surface	Opponent	Score
Loss	1997	US Open	Hard	(Australia) Patrick Rafter	3–6, 2–6, 6–4, 5–7

== Other significant finals ==
=== Grand Slam Cup ===
==== Singles: 1 (1–0) ====
Result	Year	Location	Surface	Opponent	Score
Win	1999	Munich, Germany	Hard (i)	(Germany) Tommy Haas	6–3, 6–4, 6–7^{(5–7)}, 7–6^{(7–5)}

=== Masters Series ===
==== Singles: 2 (1–1) ====
Result	Year	Tournament	Surface	Opponent	Score
Loss	1998	Indian Wells Masters	Hard	(Chile) Marcelo Ríos	3–6, 7–6^{(17–15)}, 6–7^{(4–7)}, 4–6
Win	1998	Paris Masters	Carpet (i)	(United States) Pete Sampras	6–4, 7–6^{(7–4)}, 6–3

== Career finals ==
=== Singles: 27 (15 titles, 12 runners-up) ===
Legend Grand Slam tournaments (0–1) Grand Slam Cup (1–0) ATP Super 9 / ATP Masters Series (1–1) ATP Championship Series / ATP International Series Gold (3–2) ATP World Series / ATP International Series (10–8)	Finals by surface Hard (5–5) Clay (0–1) Grass (5–0) Carpet (5–6)	Finals by setting Outdoor (8–6) Indoor (7–6)

Result	W–L	Date	Tournament	Tier	Surface	Opponent	Score
Win	1–0	Jul 1993	Hall of Fame Open, U.S.	World Series	Grass	(Argentina) Javier Frana	7–5, 6–7^{(7–9)}, 7–6^{(7–5)}
Loss	1–1	Oct 1993	Salem Open, China	World Series	Carpet (i)	(United States) Michael Chang	6–7^{(5–7)}, 7–6^{(8–6)}, 4–6
Win	2–1	Apr 1995	Seoul Open, South Korea	World Series	Hard	(Germany) Lars Rehmann	6–4, 3–1 ret.
Loss	2–2	May 1995	Delray Beach Open, U.S.	World Series	Clay	(Australia) Todd Woodbridge	4–6, 2–6
Win	3–2	Oct 1996	Salem Open, China	World Series	Carpet (i)	(Czech Republic) Martin Damm	7–6^{(7–5)}, 6–4
Loss	3–3	Feb 1997	Zagreb Indoors, Croatia	World Series	Carpet (i)	(Croatia) Goran Ivanišević	6–7^{(4–7)}, 6–4, 6–7^{(6–8)}
Loss	3–4	Feb 1997	Pacific Coast Championships, U.S.	World Series	Hard (i)	(United States) Pete Sampras	6–3, 0–5 ret.
Win	4–4	Jun 1997	Nottingham Open, UK	World Series	Grass	(Slovakia) Karol Kučera	6–4, 7–5
Loss	4–5	Sep 1997	US Open, U.S.	Grand Slam	Hard	(Australia) Patrick Rafter	3–6, 2–6, 6–4, 5–7
Win	5–5	Oct 1997	Swiss Indoors, Switzerland	World Series	Carpet (i)	(Australia) Mark Philippoussis	6–3, 7–6^{(8–6)}, 7–6^{(7–3)}
Loss	5–6	Oct 1997	Vienna Open, Austria	Champ. Series	Carpet (i)	(Croatia) Goran Ivanišević	6–4, 7–6^{(7–4)}, 6–7^{(4–7)}, 2–6, 3–6
Loss	5–7	Feb 1998	Zagreb Indoors, Croatia	World Series	Carpet (i)	(Croatia) Goran Ivanišević	6–7^{(3–7)}, 6–7^{(5–7)}
Win	6–7	Feb 1998	ECC Antwerp, Belgium	Champ. Series	Hard (i)	(Switzerland) Marc Rosset	7–6^{(7–3)}, 3–6, 6–1, 6–4
Loss	6–8	Mar 1998	Indian Wells Masters, U.S.	Super 9	Hard	(Chile) Marcelo Ríos	3–6, 7–6^{(17–15)}, 6–7^{(4–7)}, 4–6
Loss	6–9	Oct 1998	Grand Prix de Toulouse, France	World Series	Hard (i)	(Netherlands) Jan Siemerink	4–6, 4–6
Win	7–9	Nov 1998	Paris Masters, France	Super 9	Carpet (i)	(United States) Pete Sampras	6–4, 7–6^{(7–4)}, 6–3
Loss	7–10	Feb 1999	London Indoor, UK	Champ. Series	Carpet (i)	(Netherlands) Richard Krajicek	6–7^{(6–8)}, 7–6^{(7–5)}, 5–7
Loss	7–11	Aug 1999	U.S. Pro Tennis Championships, U.S.	World Series	Hard	(Russia) Marat Safin	4–6, 6–7^{(11–13)}
Win	8–11	Oct 1999	Grand Slam Cup, Germany	Grand Slam Cup	Hard (i)	(Germany) Tommy Haas	6–3, 6–4, 6–7^{(5–7)}, 7–6^{(7–5)}
Win	9–11	Oct 1999	Vienna Open, Austria	Champ. Series	Carpet (i)	(Germany) Nicolas Kiefer	6–7^{(5–7)}, 2–6, 6–3, 7–5, 6–4
Win	10–11	Mar 2001	Pacific Coast Championships, U.S.	International	Hard (i)	(United States) Andre Agassi	6–3, 6–4
Win	11–11	Jan 2002	Auckland Open, New Zealand	International	Hard	(France) Jérôme Golmard	6–7^{(0–7)}, 6–4, 7–5
Win	12–11	Aug 2002	Indianapolis Tennis Championships, U.S.	Intl. Gold	Hard	(Spain) Félix Mantilla	6–7^{(6–8)}, 6–4, 6–4
Win	13–11	Jun 2003	Nottingham Open, UK (2)	International	Grass	(United States) Mardy Fish	6–3, 6–2
Win	14–11	Jul 2004	Hall of Fame Open, U.S. (2)	International	Grass	(Germany) Alexander Popp	7–6^{(7–5)}, 7–6^{(7–2)}
Loss	14–12	Oct 2004	Kremlin Cup, Russia	International	Carpet (i)	(Russia) Nikolay Davydenko	6–3, 3–6, 5–7
Win	15–12	Jul 2005	Hall of Fame Open, U.S. (3)	International	Grass	(United States) Vince Spadea	7–6^{(7–3)}, 2–6, 6–4

=== Doubles: 5 (3 titles, 2 runner-ups) ===
Legend Grand Slam tournaments (0–0) ATP Super 9 / ATP Masters Series (0–0) ATP Championship Series / ATP International Series Gold (1–0) ATP World Series / ATP International Series (2–2)	Finals by surface Hard (0–0) Clay (1–0) Grass (1–0) Carpet (1–2)	Finals by setting Outdoor (2–0) Indoor (1–2)

Result	W–L	Date	Tournament	Tier	Surface	Partner	Opponents	Score
Win	1–0	Jul 1994	Hall of Fame Open, U.S.	World Series	Grass	(Austria) Alex Antonitsch	(United States) Kent Kinnear (United States) David Wheaton	6–4, 3–6, 6–4
Loss	1–1	Oct 1994	Vienna Open, Austria	World Series	Carpet (i)	(Austria) Alex Antonitsch	(United States) Mike Bauer (Czech Republic) David Rikl	6–7, 4–6
Loss	1–2	Mar 1995	Copenhagen Open, Denmark	World Series	Carpet (i)	(France) Guillaume Raoux	(United States) Mark Keil (Sweden) Peter Nyborg	7–6, 4–6, 6–7
Win	2–2	Sep 1996	Bournemouth International, UK	World Series	Clay	(Germany) Marc-Kevin Goellner	(France) Rodolphe Gilbert (Portugal) Nuno Marques	6–3, 7–6
Win	3–2	Feb 1999	London Indoor, UK	Champ. Series	Carpet (i)	(United Kingdom) Tim Henman	(Zimbabwe) Byron Black (South Africa) Wayne Ferreira	6–3, 7–6^{(8–6)}

== Singles performance timeline ==
Key
W	F	SF	QF	#R	RR	Q#	P#	DNQ	A	Z#	PO	G	S	B	NMS	NTI	P	NH

(W) winner; (F) finalist; (SF) semifinalist; (QF) quarterfinalist; (#R) rounds 4, 3, 2, 1; (RR) round-robin stage; (Q#) qualification round; (DNQ) did not qualify; (A) absent; (NH) not held; (SR) strike rate (events won / competed); (W–L) win–loss record.

Country Tournament	Canada			(Canada) (United Kingdom)	United Kingdom											Total		
Country Tournament	1992	1993	1994	1995^{2}	1996	1997	1998	1999	2000	2001	2002	2003	2004	2005	2006	SR	W–L	Win %
Grand Slam tournaments
Australian Open	A	A	1R	3R	1R	1R	3R	2R	A	4R	3R	A	1R	2R	A	0 / 10	11–10	47.62
French Open	A	A	3R	A	2R	1R	1R	4R	1R	2R	A	1R	1R	1R	1R	0 / 11	7–11	38.89
Wimbledon	Q3	1R	2R	4R	2R	QF	1R	4R	1R	4R	4R	2R	2R	2R	1R	0 / 14	21–14	60.00
US Open	Q1	A	1R	1R	1R	F	3R	4R	2R	3R	3R	1R	1R	1R	1R	0 / 13	16–13	55.17
Win–loss	0–0	0–1	3–4	5–3	2–4	10–4	4–4	10–4	1–3	9–4	7–3	1–3	1–4	2–4	0–3	0 / 48	55–48	54.37
Year-end championships
Tennis Masters Cup	Did not qualify					RR	RR	Did not qualify								0 / 2	2–2	50.00
Grand Slam Cup	Did not qualify					SF	DNQ	W	Not Held							1 / 2	6–1	85.71
ATP Masters Series
Indian Wells Masters	A	1R	1R	A	1R	A	F	3R	2R	1R	2R	A	A	2R	1R	0 / 10	9–10	47.37
Miami Masters	A	Q1	1R	A	2R	A	4R	4R	4R	2R	2R	A	A	2R	2R	0 / 9	11–9	55.00
Monte Carlo Masters	A	A	A	A	A	A	2R	2R	1R	1R	A	A	A	1R	1R	0 / 6	0–6	0.00
Hamburg Masters	A	A	1R	A	A	A	3R	1R	A	1R	A	A	A	2R	1R	0 / 6	2–6	25.00
Rome Masters	A	A	1R	A	1R	1R	1R	2R	1R	2R	1R	A	A	1R	3R	0 / 10	4–10	28.57
Canada Masters	3R	2R	1R	1R	A	A	A	A	A	1R	1R	2R	A	SF	1R	0 / 9	8–9	47.06
Cincinnati Masters	A	A	2R	2R	2R	1R	A	A	A	QF	2R	2R	3R	2R	1R	0 / 10	11–10	52.38
Madrid Masters^{1}	A	A	A	2R	2R	2R	QF	SF	QF	1R	A	A	A	1R	A	0 / 8	9–8	52.94
Paris Masters	A	A	A	A	A	QF	W	2R	1R	1R	A	A	A	2R	A	1 / 6	8–5	61.54
Win–loss	2–1	1–2	1–6	2–3	3–5	2–4	14–6	7–7	6–6	5–9	3–5	2–2	2–1	9–9	3–7	1 / 74	62–73	45.93
Career statistics
Titles–Finals	0–0	1–2	0–0	1–2	1–1	2–6	2–5	2–4	0–0	1–1	2–2	1–1	1–2	1–1	0–0	15 / 27	15–12	55.56
Year-end ranking	161	50	114	37	48	6	9	13	69	31	31	119	46	37	191			

^{1} This event was held in Stockholm through 1994, Essen in 1995, and Stuttgart from 1996 through 2001.

^{2} Rusedski was granted British citizenship in May 1995, and competed for Great Britain from 22 May 1995 onwards.

== Top 10 wins ==
Season	1992	1993	1994	1995	1996	1997	1998	1999	2000	2001	2002	2003	2004	2005	2006	Total
Wins	0	2	0	0	1	3	6	3	2	5	5	0	1	0	1	29

No.	Player	Rank	Event	Surface	Rd.	Score	RR
1993
1.	(Netherlands) Richard Krajicek	10	Tokyo Indoor, Japan	Carpet (i)	3R	6–4, 6–7^{(4–7)}, 7–6^{(7–2)}	130
2.	(United States) Michael Chang	7	Tokyo Indoor, Japan	Carpet (i)	QF	4–6, 6–3, 7–6^{(8–6)}	130
1996
3.	(South Africa) Wayne Ferreira	10	Stockholm Open, Sweden	Hard (i)	1R	6–3, 3–6, 6–3	53
1997
4.	(Sweden) Thomas Enqvist	10	Zagreb Indoors, Croatia	Carpet (i)	SF	6–4, 6–4	56
5.	(United States) Michael Chang	4	San Jose, United States	Hard (i)	QF	7–6^{(7–4)}, 6–4	39
6.	(Russia) Yevgeny Kafelnikov	4	Grand Slam Cup, Munich	Carpet (i)	QF	6–7^{(5–7)}, 6–3, 6–1	10
1998
7.	(Russia) Yevgeny Kafelnikov	9	Vienna Open, Austria	Carpet (i)	1R	6–3, 3–6, 7–6^{(7–3)}	17
8.	(Australia) Pat Rafter	2	Vienna Open, Austria	Carpet (i)	QF	6–3, 7–6^{(7–3)}	17
9.	(Australia) Pat Rafter	3	Stuttgart Indoor, Germany	Hard (i)	3R	7–6^{(7–4)}, 6–7^{(5–7)}, 6–4	13
10.	(Russia) Yevgeny Kafelnikov	8	Paris Masters, France	Carpet (i)	SF	6–3, 4–6, 6–4	13
11.	(United States) Pete Sampras	1	Paris Masters, France	Carpet (i)	F	6–4, 7–6^{(7–4)}, 6–3	13
12.	(United Kingdom) Tim Henman	9	ATP Tour Championships, Hanover	Hard (i)	RR	6–2, 6–4	11
1999
13.	(Brazil) Gustavo Kuerten	5	Grand Slam Cup, Munich	Hard (i)	1R	6–3, 3–6, 6–3	6
14.	(Russia) Yevgeny Kafelnikov	2	Grand Slam Cup, Munich	Hard (i)	QF	7–5, 7–6^{(8–6)}	6
15.	(United States) Todd Martin	4	Stuttgart Indoor, Germany	Hard (i)	QF	4–6, 7–6^{(12–10)}, 6–4	6
2000
16.	(Russia) Yevgeny Kafelnikov	7	Vienna Open, Austria	Hard (i)	1R	6–4, 6–7^{(3–7)}, 6–3	44
17.	(Russia) Marat Safin	2	Stuttgart Indoor, Germany	Hard (i)	3R	7–6^{(7–2)}, 6–4	89
2001
18.	(Brazil) Gustavo Kuerten	1	Australian Open, Melbourne	Hard	2R	4–6, 6–4, 6–3, 2–6, 9–7	65
19.	(Russia) Marat Safin	1	Milan Indoor, Italy	Carpet (i)	QF	6–0, 7–6^{(7–5)}	52
20.	(Australia) Lleyton Hewitt	6	San Jose, United States	Hard (i)	QF	5–7, 6–1, 6–4	58
21.	(United States) Andre Agassi	4	San Jose, United States	Hard (i)	F	6–3, 6–4	58
22.	(Spain) Juan Carlos Ferrero	4	Wimbledon, London	Grass	3R	6–1, 6–4, 6–4	40
2002
23.	(Sweden) Thomas Johansson	10	Marseille, France	Hard (i)	1R	6–4, 3–6, 6–3	30
24.	(Spain) Juan Carlos Ferrero	4	Indian Wells Masters, United States	Hard	1R	6–4, 6–3	38
25.	(Russia) Marat Safin	2	Cincinnati Masters, United States	Hard	1R	7–6^{(9–7)}, 6–2	38
26.	(Australia) Lleyton Hewitt	1	Indianapolis Championships, United States	Hard	3R	7–6^{(7–3)}, 6–4	41
27.	(Germany) Tommy Haas	3	Indianapolis Championships, United States	Hard	SF	3–6, 6–3, 6–3	41
2004
28.	(Argentina) Gastón Gaudio	9	Cincinnati Masters, United States	Hard	2R	4–6, 7–6^{(7–3)}, 6–4	96
2006
29.	(Spain) Tommy Robredo	10	Rome Masters, Italy	Clay	1R	5–7, 6–3, 6–4	45
