= Milan Indoor =

Defunct tennis tournament
- Event name: Milan (1978–97, 2001–05); London (1998–2000)
- Tour: ATP Tour (1990–2005); Grand Prix circuit (1981–89); WCT circuit (1978–80)
- Founded: 1978
- Abolished: 2005
- Editions: 28
- Location: Milan, Italy (1978–97, 2001–05); London, UK (1998–2000)
- Venue: Palazzo dello Sport; PalaLido; Palazzo Trussardi; Assago Forum; Battersea Park; London Arena
- Surface: Carpet (i) (1978–99, 2001–05); Hard (i) (2000)

The Milan Indoor, also known under various sponsored names, was a men's professional tennis tournament founded in 1973 as the ATP Milano Indoors an indoor carpet court event, that was the successor event the Milano International Indoors (1933-38, 1957-63) an indoor wood court tournament. In 1978 the event was revived as the Milan Indoor and held until 2005 when it was branded as the International of Lombardy or Internazionali di Lombardia. It took place in Milan, Italy, with the exception of three years (1998–2000) when it was held in London, United Kingdom. The event was part of the Grand Prix circuit (1981–89) and ATP Tour (1990–2005) and was played on indoor carpet courts, except for the 2000 edition which was played on an indoor hard court. The most successful singles players were John McEnroe and Boris Becker who both won four titles. Stefan Edberg and Roger Federer won the first singles title of their career at the event. A single female edition of the event was held in 1991, won by Monica Seles. Due to a lack of sponsorship the tournament was replaced on the 2006 ATP Tour by the Zagreb Indoors.

== History ==
The first four editions of the tournament, from 1978 until 1982, were part of the World Championship Tennis Series of tournaments, which during that time was incorporated into the Grand Prix calendar. From 1982 through 1989 the event was part of the Super Series tier of the Grand Prix circuit. Initially the tournament was played at the Palazzo dello Sport, near the San Siro stadium, but in 1985 the PalaLido became the event venue after heavy snowfall in January that year had caused the roof of the Palazzo dello Sport to collapse, forcing it to close. In 1987 the tournament moved again, this time to the newly-build Palazzo Trussardi. From 1990 to 1992, during the first years of the ATP Tour, the tournament was part of the World Series, its lowest tier, but in 1993 it was upgraded to the Championship Series tier. In 1991, the Assago Forum became the host of the event, before it moved back again to the Palatrussardi for the 1996 and 1997 editions.

In 1998 the tournament moved to London, England and was played at Battersea Park before moving to the London Arena in 2000 when it became part of the International Series Gold category. Due to the loss of its main sponsor the tournament moved back to its original host city Milan in 2001 where it was held at the PalaLido until its last edition in 2005. John McEnroe and Boris Becker won the singles title four times and the roll of honor contains 10 Grand Slam tournament winners, including Stefan Edberg and Roger Federer, who both won their first career singles title in Milan.

During its history the tournament was known under various, mostly sponsored, names; WCT Milan, the Cuore Tennis Cup, the Fila Trophy, the Stella Artois Indoor, the Muratti Time Indoors, the Italian Indoors, the Guardian Direct Cup, the AXA Cup, the Breil Milano Indoors, the ATP Indesit Milano Indoors, and the Internazionali di Lombardia.

== Past finals ==
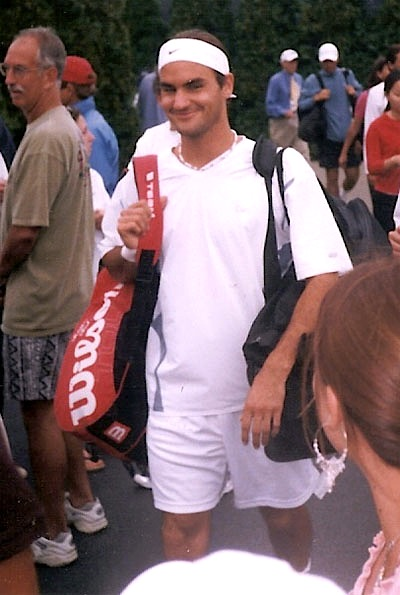
Roger Federer won his first career title in Milan in 2001, defeating Julien Boutter in the final

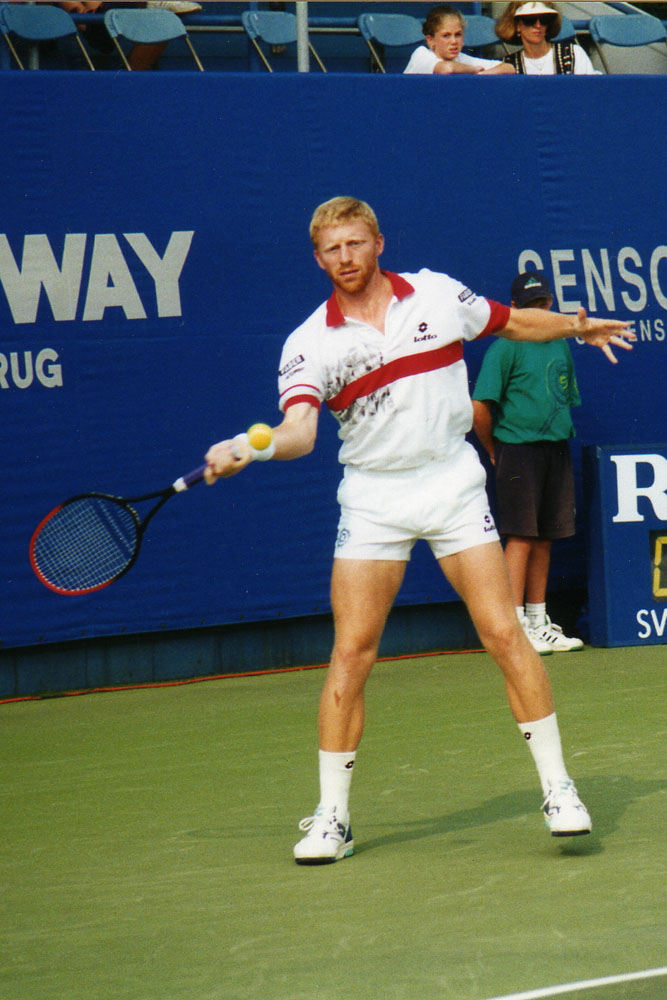
Boris Becker was the most successful player at the event, reaching five singles finals -winning four- and three doubles finals -winning all three of them-

=== Men ===
==== Singles ====
Location	Year	Champion	Runner-up	Score
Milan	1978	(Sweden) Björn Borg	(United States) Vitas Gerulaitis	6–3, 6–3
Milan	1979	(United States) John McEnroe	(Australia) John Alexander	6–4, 6–3
Milan	1980	(United States) John McEnroe	(India) Vijay Amitraj	6–1, 6–4
Milan	1981	(United States) John McEnroe	(Sweden) Björn Borg	7–6^{(7–2)}, 6–4
Milan	1982	(Argentina) Guillermo Vilas	(United States) Jimmy Connors	6–3, 6–3
Milan	1983	(Czechoslovakia) Ivan Lendl	(South Africa) Kevin Curren	5–7, 6–3, 7–6
Milan	1984	(Sweden) Stefan Edberg	(Sweden) Mats Wilander	6–4, 6–2
Milan	1985	(United States) John McEnroe	(Sweden) Anders Järryd	6–4, 6–1
Milan	1986	(Czechoslovakia) Ivan Lendl	(Sweden) Joakim Nyström	6–2, 6–2, 6–4
Milan	1987	(West Germany) Boris Becker	(Czechoslovakia) Miloslav Mečíř	6–4, 6–3
Milan	1988	(France) Yannick Noah	(United States) Jimmy Connors	4–4 retired
Milan	1989	(West Germany) Boris Becker	(Soviet Union) Alexander Volkov	6–1, 6–2
Milan	1990	(Czech Republic) Ivan Lendl	(United States) Tim Mayotte	6–3, 6–2
Milan	1991	(Soviet Union) Alexander Volkov	(Italy) Cristiano Caratti	6–1, 7–5
Milan	1992	(Italy) Omar Camporese	(Croatia) Goran Ivanišević	3–6, 6–3, 6–4
Milan	1993	(Germany) Boris Becker	(Spain) Sergi Bruguera	6–3, 6–3
Milan	1994	(Germany) Boris Becker	(Czech Republic) Petr Korda	6–2, 3–6, 6–3
Milan	1995	(Russia) Yevgeny Kafelnikov	(Germany) Boris Becker	7–5, 5–7, 7–6^{(8–6)}
Milan	1996	(Croatia) Goran Ivanišević	(Switzerland) Marc Rosset	6–3, 7–6^{(7–3)}
Milan	1997	(Croatia) Goran Ivanišević	(Spain) Sergi Bruguera	6–2, 6–2
London	1998	(Russia) Yevgeny Kafelnikov	(France) Cédric Pioline	7–5, 6–4
London	1999	(Netherlands) Richard Krajicek	(United Kingdom) Greg Rusedski	7–6^{(8–6)}, 6–7^{(5–7)}, 7–5
London	2000	(Switzerland) Marc Rosset	(Russia) Yevgeny Kafelnikov	6–4, 6–4
Milan	2001	(Switzerland) Roger Federer	(France) Julien Boutter	6–4, 6–7^{(7–9)}, 6–4
Milan	2002	(Italy) Davide Sanguinetti	(Switzerland) Roger Federer	7–6^{(7–2)}, 4–6, 6–1
Milan	2003	(Netherlands) Martin Verkerk	(Russia) Yevgeny Kafelnikov	6–4, 5–7, 7–5
Milan	2004	(France) Antony Dupuis	(Croatia) Mario Ančić	6–4, 6–7^{(12–14)}, 7–6^{(7–5)}
Milan	2005	(Sweden) Robin Söderling	(Czech Republic) Radek Štěpánek	6–3, 6–7^{(2–7)}, 7–6^{(7–5)}
replaced by Zagreb Indoors

==== Doubles ====
Location	Year	Champion	Runners-up	Score
Milan	1978	(Spain) José Higueras (Paraguay) Víctor Pecci	(Poland) Wojtek Fibak (Mexico) Raúl Ramírez	5–7, 7–6, 7–6
Milan	1979	(United States) Peter Fleming (United States) John McEnroe	(Argentina) José Luis Clerc (Czechoslovakia) Tomáš Šmíd	6–1, 6–3
Milan	1980	(United States) Peter Fleming (United States) John McEnroe	(United States) Andrew Pattison (United States) Butch Walts	6–4, 6–3
Milan	1981	(United States) Brian Gottfried (Mexico) Raúl Ramírez	(United States) John McEnroe (United States) Peter Rennert	7–6, 6–3
Milan	1982	(Switzerland) Heinz Günthardt (Australia) Peter McNamara	(Australia) Mark Edmondson (United States) Sherwood Stewart	7–6, 7–6
Milan	1983	(Czechoslovakia) Tomáš Šmíd (Czechoslovakia) Pavel Složil	(United States) Fritz Buehning (United States) Peter Fleming	6–2, 5–7, 6–4
Milan	1984	(Czech Republic) Tomáš Šmíd (Czechoslovakia) Pavel Složil	(South Africa) Kevin Curren (United States) Steve Denton	6–4, 6–3
Milan	1985	(Switzerland) Heinz Günthardt (Sweden) Anders Järryd	(Australia) Broderick Dyke (Australia) Wally Masur	6–2, 6–1
Milan	1986	(Rhodesia) Colin Dowdeswell (South Africa) Christo Steyn	(South Africa) Brian Levine (Australia) Laurie Warder	6–3, 4–6, 6–1
Milan	1987	(Germany) Boris Becker (Socialist Federal Republic of Yugoslavia) Slobodan Živojinović	(Spain) Sergio Casal (Spain) Emilio Sánchez	3–6, 6–3, 6–4
Milan	1988	(West Germany) Boris Becker (West Germany) Eric Jelen	(Czech Republic) Miloslav Mečíř (Czechoslovakia) Tomáš Šmíd	6–3, 6–3
Milan	1989	(Switzerland) Jakob Hlasek (United States) John McEnroe	(Hungary) Balázs Taróczy (Switzerland) Heinz Günthardt	6–3, 6–4
Milan	1990	(Italy) Omar Camporese (Italy) Diego Nargiso	(Netherlands) Tom Nijssen (West Germany) Udo Riglewski	6–4, 6–4
Milan	1991	(Italy) Omar Camporese (Socialist Federal Republic of Yugoslavia) Goran Ivanišević	(Netherlands) Tom Nijssen (Czechoslovakia) Cyril Suk	6–4, 7–6
Milan	1992	(United Kingdom) Neil Broad (Australia) David Macpherson	(Spain) Sergio Casal (Spain) Emilio Sánchez	5–7, 7–5, 6–4
Milan	1993	(Australia) Mark Kratzmann (Australia) Wally Masur	(Netherlands) Tom Nijssen (Czech Republic) Cyril Suk	4–6, 6–3, 6–4
Milan	1994	(Netherlands) Tom Nijssen (Czech Republic) Cyril Suk	(Netherlands) Hendrik Jan Davids (South Africa) Piet Norval	4–6, 7–6, 7–6
Milan	1995	(Germany) Boris Becker (France) Guy Forget	(Czech Republic) Petr Korda (Czech Republic) Karel Nováček	6–2, 6–4
Milan	1996	(Italy) Andrea Gaudenzi (Croatia) Goran Ivanišević	(France) Guy Forget (Switzerland) Jakob Hlasek	6–4, 7–5
Milan	1997	(Argentina) Pablo Albano (Sweden) Peter Nyborg	(South Africa) David Adams (Russia) Andrei Olhovskiy	6–4, 7–6
London	1998	(Czech Republic) Martin Damm (United States) Jim Grabb	(Russia) Yevgeny Kafelnikov (Czech Republic) Daniel Vacek	6–4, 7–5
London	1999	(United Kingdom) Tim Henman (United Kingdom) Greg Rusedski	(Zimbabwe) Byron Black (South Africa) Wayne Ferreira	6–3, 7–6^{(8–6)}
London	2000	(South Africa) David Adams (South Africa) John-Laffnie de Jager	(United States) Jan-Michael Gambill (United States) Scott Humphries	6–3, 6–7^{(7–9)}, 7–6^{(13–11)}
Milan	2001	(Netherlands) Paul Haarhuis (Netherlands) Sjeng Schalken	(Sweden) Johan Landsberg (Belgium) Tom Vanhoudt	7–6^{(7–5)}, 7–6^{(7–4)}
Milan	2002	(Germany) Karsten Braasch (Russia) Andrei Olhovskiy	(France) Julien Boutter (Belarus) Max Mirnyi	3–6, 7–6^{(7–5)}, [12–10]
Milan	2003	(Czech Republic) Petr Luxa (Czech Republic) Radek Štěpánek	(Czech Republic) Tomáš Cibulec (Czech Republic) Pavel Vízner	6–4, 7–6^{(7–4)}
Milan	2004	(United States) Jared Palmer (Czech Republic) Pavel Vízner	(Italy) Daniele Bracciali (Italy) Giorgio Galimberti	6–4, 6–4
Milan	2005	(Italy) Daniele Bracciali (Italy) Giorgio Galimberti	(France) Arnaud Clément (France) Jean-François Bachelot	6–7^{(8–10)}, 7–6^{(8–6)}, 6–4

=== Women ===
==== Singles ====
Location	Year	Champion	Runner-up	Score
Milan	1991	(Socialist Federal Republic of Yugoslavia) Monica Seles	(United States) Martina Navratilova	6–3, 3–6, 6–4

==== Doubles ====
Location	Year	Champion	Runners-up	Score
Milan	1991	(United States) Sandy Collins (United States) Lori McNeil	(Belgium) Sabine Appelmans (Italy) Raffaella Reggi	7–6^{(7–0)}, 6–3

== Event names ==
Official

- ATP Milano Indoors (1973)
- Milan Indoor (1978-1984)
- Italian Indoor (1985)
- Milan Indoor (1986-1989)
- Italian Indoor (1990)
- Milan Indoor (1991-1995)
- Italian Indoors (1996-1997)
- London Indoor (1998-2000)
- Milan Indoor (2001-2002)
- Milano Indoor (2003)
- ATP Milan Indoor (2004)
- International of Lombardy (2005)

Sponsored

- Ramazzotti Cup (1979-1980)
- Cuore Cup (1981)
- Fila Trophy Italian Indoor (1985)
- Fila Trophy Milan (1987)
- Stella Artois Milan Indoor (1988)
- Stella Artois Italian Indoor (1990)
- Muratti Time Indoor (1991-1995)
- Guardian Direct Cup (1998-1999)
- AXA Cup (2000)
- Breil Milano Indoor (2003)
- Indesit ATP Milan Indoor (2004)

== See also ==
- Internazionali di Tennis di Bergamo
