= 2002 ABN AMRO World Tennis Tournament =

- Date: 18–24 February
- Edition: 30th
- Category: ATP International Series Gold
- Draw: 32S / 16D
- Prize money: $713,000
- Surface: Hardcourt / Indoor
- Location: Rotterdam, Netherlands
- Venue: Rotterdam Ahoy

Champions

Singles
- (France) Nicolas Escudé

Doubles
- (Switzerland) Roger Federer / (Belarus) Max Mirnyi
- ABN AMRO World Tennis Tournament

The 2002 ABN AMRO World Tennis Tournament was a tennis tournament played on indoor hard courts at Rotterdam Ahoy in the Netherlands and was part of the International Series Gold of the 2002 ATP Tour. The tournament ran from 18 February through 24 February 2002. Unseeded Nicolas Escudé won the singles title.

The singles field was led by Association of Tennis Professionals (ATP) No. 3, reigning Estoril, Barcelona and Rome Masters champion Juan Carlos Ferrero, US Open quarterfinalist and Paris Masters finalist Yevgeny Kafelnikov, and Australian Open finalist and Tashkent and St. Petersburg champion Marat Safin. Also present were Tennis Masters Cup finalist and Paris Masters winner Sébastien Grosjean, Australian Open champion Thomas Johansson, Tim Henman, Roger Federer and Goran Ivanišević.

== Finals ==
=== Singles ===
(France) Nicolas Escudé defeated (United Kingdom) Tim Henman 3–6, 7–6^{(9–7)}, 6–4

- It was Escudé's 2nd title of the year and the 4th of his career. It was his 2nd consecutive win at the tournament. It was also Henman's third final defeat at the event in four years (Henman never won the title).

=== Doubles ===
(Switzerland) Roger Federer / (Belarus) Max Mirnyi defeated (The Bahamas) Mark Knowles / (Canada) Daniel Nestor 4–6, 6–3, [10–4]

- It was Federer's 2nd title of the year and the 5th of his career. It was Mirnyi's 1st title of the year and the 11th of his career.
