= 2002 BNP Paribas Masters =

- Date: 28 October – 3 November
- Edition: 30th
- Category: Tennis Masters Series
- Draw: 48S / 24D
- Prize money: $2,328,000
- Surface: Carpet / indoor
- Location: Paris, France
- Venue: Palais Omnisports de Paris-Bercy

Champions

Singles
- (Russia) Marat Safin

Doubles
- (France) Nicolas Escudé / (France) Fabrice Santoro
← 2001 ·	Paris Masters	· 2003 →

The 2002 BNP Paribas Masters was a men's tennis tournament played on indoor carpet courts. It was the 30th edition of the Paris Masters and was part of the Tennis Masters Series of the 2002 ATP Tour. It took place at the Palais Omnisports de Paris-Bercy in Paris in France from 28 October through 3 November 2002.

The singles draw was headlined by ATP No. 1, San Jose, Indian Wells, Queen's, Wimbledon champion and Cincinnati finalist Lleyton Hewitt, Scottsdale, Miami, Rome and Los Angeles winner Andre Agassi and Australian Open, Hamburg runner-up and 2000 Paris champion Marat Safin. Other top seeds were Hong Kong and Monte Carlo winner Juan Carlos Ferrero, Madrid finalist Jiří Novák, Tim Henman, Sébastien Grosjean and Roger Federer.

== Finals ==
=== Singles ===
(Russia) Marat Safin defeated (Australia) Lleyton Hewitt 7–6^{(7–4)}, 6–0, 6–4

- It was Safin's only singles title of the year and the 11th of his career.

=== Doubles ===
(France) Nicolas Escudé / (France) Fabrice Santoro defeated (Brazil) Gustavo Kuerten / (France) Cédric Pioline 6–3, 7–6^{(8–6)}

- It was Escudé's 3rd title of the year and the 5th of his career. It was Santoro's 2nd title of the year and the 13th of his career.
