= 2001 Paris Masters – Doubles =

Doubles
- 2001 Paris Masters
- 2000 Champions: (Sweden) Nicklas Kulti (Belarus) Max Mirnyi

Final
- Champions: (South Africa) Ellis Ferreira (United States) Rick Leach
- Runners-up: (India) Mahesh Bhupathi (India) Leander Paes
- Score: 3–6, 6–4, 6–3

Details
- Draw: 24
- Seeds: 8

Events
Singles	Doubles
← 2000 ·	Paris Masters	· 2002 →

Nicklas Kulti and Max Mirnyi were the defending champions but only Mirnyi competed that year with Sandon Stolle.

Mirnyi and Stolle lost in the quarterfinals to Wayne Black and Kevin Ullyett.

Ellis Ferreira and Rick Leach won in the final 3–6, 6–4, 6–3 against Mahesh Bhupathi and Leander Paes.

== Seeds ==
Champion seeds are indicated in bold text while text in italics indicates the round in which those seeds were eliminated. All eight seeded teams received byes to the second round.

1. (United States) Donald Johnson / (United States) Jared Palmer (quarterfinals)
2. (Czech Republic) Jiří Novák / (Czech Republic) David Rikl (second round)
3. (Belarus) Max Mirnyi / (Australia) Sandon Stolle (quarterfinals)
4. (Australia) Joshua Eagle / (Australia) Todd Woodbridge (quarterfinals)
5. (India) Mahesh Bhupathi / (India) Leander Paes (final)
6. (Zimbabwe) Wayne Black / (Zimbabwe) Kevin Ullyett (semifinals)
7. (Canada) Daniel Nestor / (Federal Republic of Yugoslavia) Nenad Zimonjić (semifinals)
8. (Czech Republic) Petr Pála / (Czech Republic) Pavel Vízner (second round)

== Draw ==
=== Key ===
- Q = Qualifier
- WC = Wild card
- LL = Lucky loser
- Alt = Alternate
- SE = Special exempt
- PR = Protected ranking
- ITF = ITF entry
- JE = Junior exempt
- w/o = Walkover
- r = Retired
- d = Defaulted
- SR = Special ranking

=== Final ===
Final

5
- (India) Mahesh Bhupathi
- (India) Leander Paes
**6**
4
3

- (South Africa) **Ellis Ferreira**
- (United States) **Rick Leach**
3
**6**
**6**

=== Top half ===
First round

Second round

Quarterfinals

Semifinals

1
- (United States) **D Johnson**
- (United States) **J Palmer**
**6**
**6**

ALT
- (Spain) A Portas
- (Spain) T Robredo
3
3

WC
- (France) A Clément
- (France) N Escudé
1
4

WC
- (France) **A Clément**
- (France) **N Escudé**
**6**
**6**

1
- (United States) D Johnson
- (United States) J Palmer
**6**
6^{4}
3

WC
- (France) J Benneteau
- (France) P-H Mathieu
2
0

7
(Canada) **D Nestor**
(Federal Republic of Yugoslavia) **N Zimonjić**
4
**7^{7}**
**6**

- (The Bahamas) **M Knowles**
- (United States) **B MacPhie**
**6**
**6**

- (The Bahamas) M Knowles
- (United States) B MacPhie
6^{6}
2

7
(Canada) **D Nestor**
(Federal Republic of Yugoslavia) **N Zimonjić**
**7^{8}**
**6**

7
(Canada) D Nestor
(Federal Republic of Yugoslavia) N Zimonjić
6^{7}
5

5
- (India) **M Bhupathi**
- (India) **L Paes**
**7^{9}**
**7**

4
- (Australia) **J Eagle**
- (Australia) **T Woodbridge**
6^{2}
**7**
**6**

WC
- (Morocco) H Arazi
- (France) A Dupuis

- (Netherlands) P Haarhuis
- (Netherlands) S Schalken
**7^{7}**
5
4

- (Netherlands) **P Haarhuis**
- (Netherlands) **S Schalken**
w/o

4
- (Australia) J Eagle
- (Australia) T Woodbridge
**7^{7}**
3
2

- (South Africa) **D Adams**
- (Argentina) **L Arnold**
**7**
**7**

5
- (India) **M Bhupathi**
- (India) **L Paes**
6^{5}
**6**
**6**

- (Australia) A Florent
- (Australia) D Macpherson
5
5

- (South Africa) D Adams
- (Argentina) L Arnold
4
5

5
- (India) **M Bhupathi**
- (India) **L Paes**
**6**
**7**

=== Bottom half ===
First round

Second round

Quarterfinals

Semifinals

6
- (Zimbabwe) **W Black**
- (Zimbabwe) **K Ullyett**
**6**
6^{5}
**6**

WC
- (France) **J Boutter**
- (Brazil) **G Kuerten**
**7^{7}**
4
**6**

WC
- (France) J Boutter
- (Brazil) G Kuerten
2
**7^{7}**
4

- (United States) B Bryan
- (United States) M Bryan
6^{5}
**6**
3

6
- (Zimbabwe) **W Black**
- (Zimbabwe) **K Ullyett**
**6**
6^{1}
**6**

- (Australia) **M Hill**
- (United States) **J Tarango**
**6**
**7**

3
- (Belarus) M Mirnyi
- (Australia) S Stolle
4
**7^{7}**
3

WC
- (France) C Pioline
- (France) F Santoro
4
5

- (Australia) M Hill
- (United States) J Tarango
4
6^{7}

3
- (Belarus) **M Mirnyi**
- (Australia) **S Stolle**
**6**
**7^{9}**

6
- (Zimbabwe) W Black
- (Zimbabwe) K Ullyett
**6**
4
5

- (South Africa) **E Ferreira**
- (United States) **R Leach**
4
**6**
**7**

8
- (Czech Republic) P Pála
- (Czech Republic) P Vízner
**7**
6^{2}
4

- (South Africa) **E Ferreira**
- (United States) **R Leach**
**6**
**6**

- (South Africa) **E Ferreira**
- (United States) **R Leach**
5
**7^{7}**
**6**

ALT
- (Argentina) G Cañas
- (Belgium) T Vanhoudt
4
2

- (South Africa) **E Ferreira**
- (United States) **R Leach**
**7**
**7^{7}**

WC
- (France) M Llodra
- (France) N Mahut
3
6^{5}

- (Argentina) M García
- (Czech Republic) C Suk
5
6^{1}

- (Argentina) **M García**
- (Czech Republic) **C Suk**
**6**
**7^{7}**

- (Argentina) **M García**
- (Czech Republic) **C Suk**
4

2
- (Czech Republic) J Novák
- (Czech Republic) D Rikl
1^{r}
