= Marat Safin career statistics =

Career finals
Discipline	Type	Won	Lost	Total	WR^{1}
Singles	Grand Slam tournaments	2	2	4	50%
Singles	Year-end championships	–	–	–	–
Singles	ATP Masters 1000^{2}	5	3	8	63%
Singles	Olympic Games	–	–	–	–
Singles	ATP Tour 500	1	3	4	25%
Singles	ATP Tour 250	7	4	11	64%
Singles	Total	15	12	27	56%
Doubles	Grand Slam tournaments	–	–	–	–
Doubles	Year-end championships	–	–	–	–
Doubles	ATP Masters 1000^{2}	–	–	–	–
Doubles	Olympic Games	–	–	–	–
Doubles	ATP Tour 500	–	–	–	–
Doubles	ATP Tour 250	2	4	6	33%
Doubles	Total	2	4	6	33%
Total		17	16	33	52%
1) WR = Winning Rate; 2) Formerly known as "Super 9" (1996–1999), "Tennis Masters Series" (2000–2003) or "ATP Masters Series" (2004–2008).

This is a list of the main career statistics of Russian former professional tennis player Marat Safin.

== Historic records and career achievements ==
At the 1998 French Open, Safin shook the tennis world by defeating defending champion Gustavo Kuerten in the second round in 5 sets, taking out the defending champion in his first Grand Slam appearance. He was named ATP Newcomer of the Year by the end of the season. The following year he reached the finals of Paris Masters on his first attempt, losing in the final to reigning world No. 1 Andre Agassi.

He set several records in 2000, including some that still stands today. In August, Safin defeated qualifier Harel Levy to win his first Masters Series title at the 2000 Canada Masters, becoming one of the few players in the Open Era to win a Masters tournament on their first attempt. In September, Safin defeated 4-time champion and 4th seed Pete Sampras in the final in straight sets to win his first Grand Slam title at the 2000 US Open. By winning the US Open at the age of 20 years and 228 days, Safin became the 3rd youngest winner in the history of the tournament at the time and the first, and was the only Russian to win the title in men's singles until his country man Danil Medvedev won the US open title in 2021 by defeating Novak Djokovic. He also became the youngest Russian to win a Grand Slam. After winning his second Masters title of the year at the Paris Masters in November, Safin became the youngest player in the Open Era at the time to reach the World No. 1 ranking at the age of 20 years and 299 days, a record since broken by Lleyton Hewitt in 2001. Safin's total number of titles (7) and finals (9) was the most on the 2000 ATP Tour, and he is also named ATP Most Improved Player.

In 2002, Safin reached his first Australian Open final, but was upset by Thomas Johansson, who has never progressed beyond the quarterfinals of a Slam prior to this tournament, in 4 sets after winning the first set. He reached the final at the Hamburg Masters for the second time in 3 years (first being in 2000). Later, he also reached his first French Open semifinal, and almost regained the No. 1 ranking (he was ranked world No. 2 for 13 weeks after the French Open). In November, he won the Paris Masters for a second time, defeating reigning world No. 1 Lleyton Hewitt in straight sets. In December, Safin lead Russia to her first Davis Cup title. The team made Davis Cup history by being the second to win the event after losing the doubles tie-breaker, and being the first team to win a (live-televised) five-set finals match by coming back from a two-set deficit. He won the ATP Fan's Favorite for the record second consecutive time after winning it in 2001, which was later broken by Roger Federer in 2005.

After a series of injuries that sidelined him for the majority of the 2003 season, Safin reached his second Australian Open final in 2004, with a win over 1st seed Andy Roddick in the quarterfinals and Andre Agassi in the semifinals, ending Agassi's 26-match win-streak at the Australian Open, however both matches has gone to five sets and Safin was physically drained for the final, as none of his matches during the tournament went under 4 sets. He was defeated by Roger Federer in straight sets, and as a result, Federer became world No. 1 for the first time in his career, and would go on to hold it for a record 237 weeks. In October, he won a Masters title in Madrid, defeating world No. 10 David Nalbandian in straight sets in the final. In November, he won the Paris Masters for a record-tying 3rd time, defeating Radek Štěpánek in straight sets in the final. The record was later broken by Novak Djokovic in 2015. Safin became the first man to win Paris Masters twice in 2 attempts. By winning the Madrid Masters and Paris Masters in the same year, Safin became the first man in Open Era to win the last two Masters title at the same year.

In 2005, Safin reached his 3rd Australian Open final in 4 years, after a memorable win over Roger Federer in the semifinals in 5 sets that lasted 4 hours and 28 minutes as a rematch of last year's final, saving a match point in the 4th set and ending Federer's 26-match win streak over Top 10 players, to set up a clash with home favorite Lleyton Hewitt. Safin prevailed in 4 sets after losing the first set to win his first Australian Open title, becoming the first man since Stefan Edberg in 1985 to win Australian Open after saving a match point, and remains the last man to do so. He became the first Russian since Yevgeny Kafelnikov in 1999 to win the Australian Open. However, injuries kept him off court for the remainder of the season since August, and he was forced to miss significant tournaments including Madrid Masters, Paris Masters (both of which he was the defending champion), US Open, and Tennis Masters Cup.

In 2006, Safin led Russia to a second Davis Cup title, after winning the decisive final rubber against José Acasuso in 4 sets. In 2007 Safin again helped Russia reach the Davis Cup final, winning a decisive rubber against Paul-Henri Mathieu in straight sets in the quarterfinals. However, Safin did not play in the final, and Russia lost 1–4 to United States. In 2008, Safin became the first Russian male to reach the Wimbledon semifinals, defeating 3rd seed Djokovic in straight sets in the second round which would follow a run of 28 consecutive quarterfinals appearances at Grand Slam tournaments and become the Serb's earliest loss at a Grand Slam event until the 2017 Australian Open. He also became the fourth of five active players at the time to reach the semifinals in all four Grand Slams, joining Federer, Nalbandian, and Djokovic, and the only Russian in the history to do so.

In 2016, Safin became the first Russian to be inducted into the International Tennis Hall of Fame.

== Significant finals ==
=== Grand Slam tournaments ===
==== Singles: 4 (2 titles, 2 runners-up) ====
Result	Year	Championship	Surface	Opponent	Score
Win	2000	US Open	Hard	(United States) Pete Sampras	6–4, 6–3, 6–3
Loss	2002	Australian Open	Hard	(Sweden) Thomas Johansson	6–3, 4–6, 4–6, 6–7^{(4–7)}
Loss	2004	Australian Open	Hard	(Switzerland) Roger Federer	6–7^{(3–7)}, 4–6, 2–6
Win	2005	Australian Open	Hard	(Australia) Lleyton Hewitt	1–6, 6–3, 6–4, 6–4

=== Masters Series tournaments ===
==== Singles: 8 (5 titles, 3 runners-up) ====
Result	Year	Tournament	Surface	Opponent	Score
Loss	1999	Paris Masters	Carpet (i)	(United States) Andre Agassi	6–7^{(1–7)}, 2–6, 6–4, 4–6
Loss	2000	Hamburg Masters	Clay	(Brazil) Gustavo Kuerten	4–6, 7–5, 4–6, 7–5, 6–7^{(3–7)}
Win	2000	Canada Masters	Hard	(Israel) Harel Levy	6–2, 6–3
Win	2000	Paris Masters	Carpet (i)	(Australia) Mark Philippoussis	3–6, 7–6^{(9–7)}, 6–4, 3–6, 7–6^{(10–8)}
Loss	2002	Hamburg Masters	Clay	(Switzerland) Roger Federer	1–6, 3–6, 4–6
Win	2002	Paris Masters (2)	Carpet (i)	(Australia) Lleyton Hewitt	7–6^{(7–4)}, 6–0, 6–4
Win	2004	Madrid Masters	Hard (i)	(Argentina) David Nalbandian	6–2, 6–4, 6–3
Win	2004	Paris Masters (3)	Carpet (i)	(Czech Republic) Radek Štěpánek	6–3, 7–6^{(7–5)}, 6–3

== Career finals ==
=== ATP career finals ===
==== Singles: 27 (15 titles, 12 runners-up) ====
Legend Grand Slam tournaments (2–2) ATP World Tour Finals (0–0) ATP World Tour Masters 1000 (5–3) ATP World Tour 500 Series (1–3) ATP World Tour 250 Series (7–4)	Titles by surface Hard (10–5) Clay (2–4) Grass (0–1) Carpet (3–2)	Titles by setting Outdoor (9–9) Indoor (6–3)

Result	W–L	Date	Tournament	Surface	Opponent	Score
Win	1–0	Aug 1999	Boston, USA	Hard	(United Kingdom) Greg Rusedski	6–4, 7–6^{(13–11)}
Loss	1–1	Nov 1999	Paris, France	Carpet (i)	(United States) Andre Agassi	6–7^{(1–7)}, 2–6, 6–4, 4–6
Win	2–1	April 2000	Barcelona, Spain	Clay	(Spain) Juan Carlos Ferrero	6–3, 6–3, 6–4
Win	3–1	May 2000	Majorca, Spain	Clay	(Sweden) Mikael Tillström	6–4, 6–3
Loss	3–2	May 2000	Hamburg, Germany	Clay	(Brazil) Gustavo Kuerten	4–6, 7–5, 4–6, 7–5, 6–7^{(3–7)}
Win	4–2	Jul 2000	Toronto, Canada	Hard	(Israel) Harel Levy	6–2, 6–3
Loss	4–3	Aug 2000	Indianapolis, USA	Hard	(Brazil) Gustavo Kuerten	6–3, 6–7^{(2–7)}, 6–7^{(2–7)}
Win	5–3	Aug 2000	US Open, New York City, USA	Hard	(United States) Pete Sampras	6–4, 6–3, 6–3
Win	6–3	Sep 2000	Tashkent, Uzbekistan	Hard	(Italy) Davide Sanguinetti	6–3, 6–4
Win	7–3	Nov 2000	St. Petersburg, Russia	Hard (i)	(Slovakia) Dominik Hrbatý	2–6, 6–4, 6–4
Win	8–3	Nov 2000	Paris, France	Carpet (i)	(Australia) Mark Philippoussis	3–6, 7–6^{(9–7)}, 6–4, 3–6, 7–6^{(10–8)}
Loss	8–4	Feb 2001	Dubai, UAE	Hard	(Spain) Juan Carlos Ferrero	2–6, 3–6
Win	9–4	Sep 2001	Tashkent, Uzbekistan (2)	Hard	(Russia) Yevgeny Kafelnikov	6–2, 6–2
Win	10–4	Oct 2001	St. Petersburg, Russia (2)	Hard (i)	(Germany) Rainer Schüttler	3–6, 6–3, 6–3
Loss	10–5	Jan 2002	Australian Open, Melbourne	Hard	(Sweden) Thomas Johansson	6–3, 4–6, 4–6, 6–7^{(4–7)}
Loss	10–6	May 2002	Hamburg, Germany	Clay	(Switzerland) Roger Federer	1–6, 3–6, 4–6
Win	11–6	Oct 2002	Paris, France (2)	Carpet (i)	(Australia) Lleyton Hewitt	7–6^{(7–4)}, 6–0, 6–4
Loss	11–7	Apr 2003	Barcelona, Spain	Clay	(Spain) Carlos Moyá	7–5, 2–6, 2–6, 0–3, ret.
Loss	11–8	Feb 2004	Australian Open, Melbourne	Hard	(Switzerland) Roger Federer	6–7^{(3–7)}, 4–6, 2–6
Loss	11–9	Apr 2004	Estoril, Portugal	Clay	(Argentina) Juan Ignacio Chela	7–6^{(7–2)}, 3–6, 3–6
Win	12–9	Sep 2004	Beijing, China	Hard	(Russia) Mikhail Youzhny	7–6^{(7–4)}, 7–5
Win	13–9	Oct 2004	Madrid, Spain	Hard (i)	(Argentina) David Nalbandian	6–2, 6–4, 6–3
Win	14–9	Nov 2004	Paris, France (3)	Carpet (i)	(Czech Republic) Radek Štěpánek	6–3, 7–6^{(7–5)}, 6–3
Win	15–9	Jan 2005	Australian Open, Melbourne	Hard	(Australia) Lleyton Hewitt	1–6, 6–3, 6–4, 6–4
Loss	15–10	Jun 2005	Halle, Germany	Grass	(Switzerland) Roger Federer	4–6, 7–6^{(8–6)}, 4–6
Loss	15–11	Oct 2006	Moscow, Russia	Carpet (i)	(Russia) Nikolay Davydenko	4–6, 7–5, 4–6
Loss	15–12	Oct 2008	Moscow, Russia	Hard (i)	(Russia) Igor Kunitsyn	6–7^{(6–8)}, 7–6^{(7–4)}, 3–6

==== Doubles: 6 (2 titles, 4 runners-up) ====
Legend Grand Slam tournaments (0–0) ATP World Tour Finals (0–0) ATP World Tour Masters 1000 (0–0) ATP World Tour 500 Series (0–0) ATP World Tour 250 Series (2–4)	Titles by surface Hard (0–2) Clay (1–0) Grass (0–1) Carpet (1–1)	Titles by setting Outdoor (1–1) Indoor (1–3)

Result	W–L	Date	Tournament	Surface	Partner	Opponents	Score
Loss	0–1	Oct 1999	Moscow, Russia	Carpet (i)	(Ukraine) Andrei Medvedev	(United States) Justin Gimelstob (Czech Republic) Daniel Vacek	2–6, 1–6
Win	1–1	Jul 2001	Gstaad, Switzerland	Clay	(Switzerland) Roger Federer	(Australia) Michael Hill (United States) Jeff Tarango	0–1, retired
Loss	1–2	Oct 2001	St. Petersburg, Russia	Hard (i)	(Georgia (country)) Irakli Labadze	(Russia) Denis Golovanov (Russia) Yevgeny Kafelnikov	5–7, 4–6
Loss	1–3	Oct 2002	St. Petersburg, Russia	Hard (i)	(Georgia (country)) Irakli Labadze	(South Africa) David Adams (United States) Jared Palmer	6–7^{(8–10)}, 3–6
Loss	1–4	Jun 2005	Halle, Germany	Grass	(Sweden) Joachim Johansson	(Switzerland) Yves Allegro (Switzerland) Roger Federer	5–7, 7–6^{(8–6)}, 3–6
Win	2–4	Oct 2007	Moscow, Russia	Carpet (i)	(Russia) Dmitry Tursunov	(Czech Republic) Tomáš Cibulec (Croatia) Lovro Zovko	6–4, 6–2

== Performance timelines ==
Key
W	F	SF	QF	#R	RR	Q#	P#	DNQ	A	Z#	PO	G	S	B	NMS	NTI	P	NH

(W) winner; (F) finalist; (SF) semifinalist; (QF) quarterfinalist; (#R) rounds 4, 3, 2, 1; (RR) round-robin stage; (Q#) qualification round; (DNQ) did not qualify; (A) absent; (NH) not held; (SR) strike rate (events won / competed); (W–L) win–loss record.

Davis Cup matches are included in the statistics. Walkovers or qualifying matches are neither official wins nor losses.

Current as far as 2009 BNP Paribas Masters.

=== Singles ===
Tournament	1997	1998	1999	2000	2001	2002	2003	2004	2005	2006	2007	2008	2009	SR	W–L
Grand Slam Tournaments
Australian Open	A	A	3R	1R	4R	F	3R	F	W	A	3R	2R	3R	1 / 10	31–8
French Open	A	4R	4R	QF	3R	SF	A	4R	4R	1R	2R	2R	2R	0 / 11	26–11
Wimbledon	A	1R	A	2R	QF	2R	A	1R	3R	2R	3R	SF	1R	0 / 10	16–10
US Open	A	4R	2R	W	SF	2R	A	1R	A	4R	2R	2R	1R	1 / 10	22–9
Win–loss	0–0	6–3	6–3	12–3	14–4	13–4	2–0	9–4	12–2	4–3	6–4	8–4	3–4	2 / 41	95–38
Year-end championship
ATP World Tour Finals	did not qualify			SF	DNQ	RR	DNQ	SF	A	did not qualify				0 / 3	4–7
ATP World Tour Masters 1000
Indian Wells	A	A	3R	2R	1R	3R	3R	3R	3R	4R	2R	1R	3R	0 / 11	13–11
Miami	A	A	4R	2R	2R	QF	2R	2R	3R	1R	2R	1R	3R	0 / 11	7–11
Monte-Carlo	A	A	1R	1R	1R	QF	A	SF	3R	1R	2R	2R	2R	0 / 10	12–10
Rome	A	A	2R	2R	2R	2R	A	3R	2R	2R	2R	1R	1R	0 / 10	9–10
Hamburg^{1}	A	A	2R	F	2R	F	A	3R	2R	1R	2R	3R	1R	0 / 10	18–10
Canada	A	A	A	W	1R	QF	A	1R	A	1R	2R	2R	1R	1 / 8	11–7
Cincinnati	A	A	1R	3R	1R	1R	A	QF	QF	1R	1R	1R	2R	0 / 10	9–10
Madrid^{2}	A	A	2R	3R	2R	2R	1R	W	A	QF	1R	A	2R	1 / 9	11–8
Paris	A	A	F	W	3R	W	A	W	A	QF	A	1R	2R	3 / 8	24–5
Win–loss	0–0	0–0	12–8	21–7	3–9	22–8	2–3	22–7	9–6	9–9	4–8	4–8	6–9	5 / 87	114–82
Career statistics
Finals	0	0	2	9	3	3	1	5	2	1	0	1	0	27	
Titles	0	0	1	7	2	1	0	3	1	0	0	0	0	15	
Hard win–loss	0–0	10–7	16–13	36–15	27–14	21–15	8–7	27–12	12–4	19–12	14–12	9–14	16–15	215–140	
Clay win–loss	0–0	6–8	11–10	25–9	6–7	22–8	4–2	17–6	7–5	6–7	6–6	9–8	2–6	121–82	
Grass win–loss	0–0	0–1	0–2	3–2	5–2	1–1	0–0	0–2	6–2	2–2	3–2	6–2	0–1	26–19	
Carpet win–loss	0–1	1–2	12–7	9–1	7–4	12–2	0–2	8–3	2–0	8–4	0–0	0–0	–^{2}	60–26	
Overall win–loss	0–1	17–18	39–32	73–27	45–27	56–26	12–11	52–23	27–11	35–25	23–20	24–24	19–22	422–267	
Win %	0%	49%	55%	73%	63%	68%	52%	69%	71%	58%	53%	50%	46%	61.25%	
Year End Ranking	203	49	24	2	11	3	77	4	12	26	56	29	61	$14,373,291	

Note: At the 2003 Australian Open, Safin withdrew prior to the third round.

^{1} Held as Hamburg Masters (outdoor clay) until 2008, Madrid Masters (outdoor clay) 2009 – present.
^{2} Held as Stuttgart Masters (indoor hard) until 2001, Madrid Masters (indoor hard) from 2002 to 2008, and Shanghai Masters (outdoor hard) 2009 – present.

=== Doubles ===
Tournament	1999	2000	2001	2002	2003	2004	2005	2006	2007	2008	2009	SR	W–L
Grand Slam Tournaments
Australian Open	A	1R	A	A	A	A	A	A	A	A	1R	0 / 2	0–2
French Open	A	A	1R	A	A	A	A	A	A	A	A	0 / 1	0–1
Wimbledon	A	A	3R	A	A	A	A	A	A	A	A	0 / 1	2–1
US Open	A	A	A	A	A	A	A	A	A	A	A	0 / 0	0–0
Win–loss	0–0	0–1	2–2	0–0	0–0	0–0	0–0	0–0	0–0	0–0	0–1	0 / 4	2–4
ATP World Tour Masters 1000
Indian Wells	1R	A	A	1R	2R	A	1R	1R	A	A	1R	0 / 6	1–6
Miami	3R	A	A	1R	1R	1R	1R	1R	A	A	1R	0 / 7	2–7
Monte-Carlo	A	1R	A	QF	A	1R	1R	1R	A	A	1R	0 / 6	2–6
Rome	A	A	A	1R	A	2R	2R	1R	A	A	A	0 / 4	2–4
Hamburg^{1}	A	Q2	1R	1R	A	A	A	A	A	A	A	0 / 2	0–2
Canada	A	A	A	1R	A	1R	A	2R	A	A	A	0 / 3	1–3
Cincinnati	1R	1R	1R	1R	A	A	A	QF	A	A	A	0 / 5	2–5
Madrid^{2}	A	QF	A	1R	A	1R	A	A	A	A	A	0 / 3	2–3
Paris Masters	A	1R	A	A	A	A	A	1R	A	A	A	0 / 2	0–2
Win–loss	2–3	2–4	0–2	2–8	1–2	1–5	1–4	3–7	0–0	0–0	0–3	0 / 38	12–38

^{1} Held as Hamburg Masters (outdoor clay) until 2008, Madrid Masters (outdoor clay) 2009 – present.
^{2} Held as Stuttgart Masters (indoor hard) until 2001, Madrid Masters (indoor hard) from 2002 to 2008, and Shanghai Masters (outdoor hard) 2009 – present.

== Record against other players ==
=== Singles ===
Safin's record against players who held a top 10 ranking, with those who reached No. 1 in bold

- (France) Sébastien Grosjean (7–2)
- (Australia) **Lleyton Hewitt** (7–7)
- (Argentina) David Nalbandian (6–3)
- (Spain) **Juan Carlos Ferrero** (6–6)
- (Australia) Mark Philippoussis (5–1)
- (Spain) Àlex Corretja (4–1)
- (Chile) Nicolás Massú (4–1)
- (France) Richard Gasquet (4–2)
- (Argentina) Gastón Gaudio (4–2)
- (United States) **Pete Sampras** (4–3)
- (Sweden) Jonas Björkman (4–4)
- (Russia) Nikolay Davydenko (4–4)
- (Spain) Tommy Robredo (4–6)
- (South Africa) Wayne Ferreira (3–0)
- (Russia) Mikhail Youzhny (3–0)
- (Czech Republic) Jiří Novák (3–1)
- (Chile) **Marcelo Ríos** (3–1)
- (Switzerland) Marc Rosset (3–1)
- (Germany) Rainer Schüttler (3–1)
- (Thailand) Paradorn Srichaphan (3–1)
- (Argentina) Guillermo Cañas (3–2)
- (France) Cédric Pioline (3–2)
- (United States) **Andre Agassi** (3–3)
- (United Kingdom) Tim Henman (3–3)
- (Sweden) Thomas Johansson (3–3)
- (United Kingdom) Greg Rusedski (3–3)
- (Germany) Nicolas Kiefer (3–4)
- (Slovakia) Karol Kučera (3–4)
- (Brazil) **Gustavo Kuerten** (3–4)
- (Spain) **Carlos Moyá** (3–4)
- (United States) **Andy Roddick** (3–4)
- (Chile) Fernando González (3–6)
- (Serbia) **Novak Djokovic** (2–0)
- (Latvia) Ernests Gulbis (2–0)
- (United States) Todd Martin (2–0)
- (Sweden) Robin Söderling (2–0)
- (Czech Republic) Tomáš Berdych (2–1)
- (United States) Michael Chang (2–1)
- (Sweden) Thomas Enqvist (2–1)
- (United States) James Blake (2–2)
- (Russia) **Yevgeny Kafelnikov** (2–2)
- (Croatia) Ivan Ljubičić (2–2)
- (Spain) Félix Mantilla (2–2)
- (Germany) Tommy Haas (2–5)
- (Switzerland) **Roger Federer** (2–10)
- (Croatia) Mario Ančić (1–0)
- (Germany) **Boris Becker** (1–0)
- (Spain) Alberto Berasategui (1–0)
- (Croatia) Marin Čilić (1–0)
- (United States) Mardy Fish (1–0)
- (Sweden) Magnus Gustafsson (1–0)
- (Czech Republic) Petr Korda (1–0)
- (United Kingdom) **Andy Murray** (1–0)
- (Austria) **Thomas Muster** (1–0)
- (Spain) Fernando Verdasco (1–0)
- (Cyprus) Marcos Baghdatis (1–1)
- (Argentina) Guillermo Coria (1–1)
- (Spain) Albert Costa (1–1)
- (United States) **Jim Courier** (1–1)
- (Spain) David Ferrer (1–1)
- (United States) John Isner (1–1)
- (Croatia) Goran Ivanišević (1–1)
- (Ecuador) Nicolás Lapentti (1–1)
- (Sweden) Magnus Larsson (1–1)
- (Argentina) Mariano Puerta (1–1)
- (Serbia) Janko Tipsarević (1–1)
- (France) Arnaud Clément (1–2)
- (Ukraine) Andriy Medvedev (1–2)
- (Sweden) Magnus Norman (1–2)
- (Czech Republic) Radek Štěpánek (1–2)
- (Switzerland) Stan Wawrinka (1–3)
- (Austria) Jürgen Melzer (1–4)
- (Spain) Carlos Costa (0–1)
- (Argentina) Juan Martín del Potro (0–1)
- (Netherlands) Richard Krajicek (0–1)
- (Australia) **Pat Rafter** (0–1)
- (France) Jo-Wilfried Tsonga (0–1)
- (Argentina) Juan Mónaco (0–2)
- (Spain) **Rafael Nadal** (0–2)
- (Spain) Nicolás Almagro (0–3)
- (France) Gaël Monfils (0–4)

==== Wins per season ====
Season	1997	1998	1999	2000	2001	2002	2003	2004	2005	2006	2007	2008	2009	**Total**
Wins	0	2	4	9	3	7	1	8	3	7	0	4	1	**49**

#	Player	Rank	Event	Surface	Rd	Score
1998
1.	(Brazil) Gustavo Kuerten	8	French Open, Paris, France	Clay	2R	3–6, 7–6^{(7–5)}, 3–6, 6–1, 6–4
2.	(Czech Republic) Petr Korda	5	Ostrava, Czech Republic	Carpet (i)	1R	6–4, 6–2
1999
3.	(Spain) Àlex Corretja	4	Rotterdam, Netherlands	Carpet (i)	1R	7–5, 3–6, 6–3
4.	(United Kingdom) Greg Rusedski	9	Boston, United States	Hard	F	6–4, 7–6^{(13–11)}
5.	(United Kingdom) Tim Henman	9	Vienna, Austria	Carpet (i)	1R	6–4, 2–6, 6–3
6.	(Brazil) Gustavo Kuerten	5	Paris, France	Carpet (i)	2R	7–6^{(7–4)}, 3–6, 7–6^{(7–4)}
2000
7.	(Ecuador) Nicolás Lapentti	8	Barcelona, Spain	Clay	QF	7–6^{(7–3)}, 7–5
8.	(Sweden) Magnus Norman	4	Barcelona, Spain	Clay	SF	2–6, 7–6^{(7–4)}, 6–3
9.	(France) Cédric Pioline	5	Hamburg, Germany	Clay	QF	7–6^{(7–4)}, 4–6, 6–3
10.	(France) Cédric Pioline	6	French Open, Paris, France	Clay	4R	6–4, 1–6, 6–3, 7–5
11.	(United States) Pete Sampras	2	Toronto, Canada	Hard	QF	6–4, 3–6, 7–6^{(12–10)}
12.	(United States) Pete Sampras	4	US Open, New York, United States	Hard	F	6–4, 6–3, 6–3
13.	(Spain) Àlex Corretja	8	Paris, France	Carpet (i)	QF	7–6^{(7–5)}, 6–3
14.	(Spain) Àlex Corretja	7	Tennis Masters Cup, Lisbon, Portugal	Hard (i)	RR	6–7^{(6–8)}, 7–5, 6–3
15.	(Australia) Lleyton Hewitt	6	Tennis Masters Cup, Lisbon, Portugal	Hard (i)	RR	6–4, 6–4
2001
16.	(United States) Pete Sampras	5	World Team Cup, Düsseldorf, Germany	Clay	RR	7–6^{(7–0)}, 7–5
17.	(Russia) Yevgeny Kafelnikov	6	Tashkent, Uzbekistan	Hard	F	6–2, 6–2
18.	(Russia) Yevgeny Kafelnikov	6	St. Petersburg, Russia	Hard (i)	SF	6–7^{(4–7)}, 6–2, 6–4
2002
19.	(United States) Pete Sampras	10	Australian Open, Melbourne, Australia	Hard	4R	6–2, 6–4, 6–7^{(5–7)}, 7–6^{(10–8)}
20.	(Germany) Tommy Haas	9	Australian Open, Melbourne, Australia	Hard	SF	6–7^{(5–7)}, 7–6^{(7–4)}, 3–6, 6–0, 6–2
21.	(Sweden) Thomas Johansson	9	Davis Cup, Moscow, Russia	Clay (i)	RR	6–4, 6–4, 6–4
22.	(Australia) Lleyton Hewitt	**1**	Hamburg, Germany	Clay	QF	6–3, 6–1
23.	(France) Sébastien Grosjean	10	French Open, Paris, France	Clay	QF	6–3, 6–2, 6–2
24.	(Spain) Carlos Moyá	10	Paris, France	Carpet (i)	SF	7–5, 7–6^{(7–4)}
25.	(Australia) Lleyton Hewitt	**1**	Paris, France	Carpet (i)	F	7–6^{(7–4)}, 6–0, 6–4
2003
26.	(Spain) Juan Carlos Ferrero	3	Barcelona, Spain	Clay	SF	6–4, 6–3
2004
27.	(United States) Andy Roddick	**1**	Australian Open, Melbourne, Australia	Hard	QF	2–6, 6–3, 7–5, 6–7^{(0–7)}, 6–4
28.	(United States) Andre Agassi	4	Australian Open, Melbourne, Australia	Hard	SF	7–6^{(8–6)}, 7–6^{(8–6)}, 5–7, 1–6, 6–3
29.	(France) Sébastien Grosjean	10	Hamburg, Germany	Clay	1R	7–6^{(8–6)}, 7–5
30.	(United States) Andre Agassi	7	Madrid, Spain	Hard (i)	SF	6–3, 7–6^{(7–4)}
31.	(Argentina) David Nalbandian	10	Madrid, Spain	Hard (i)	F	6–2, 6–4, 6–3
32.	(Australia) Lleyton Hewitt	3	Paris, France	Carpet (i)	QF	6–4, 7–6^{(7–2)}
33.	(Argentina) Guillermo Coria	6	Tennis Masters Cup, Houston	Hard	RR	6–1, 6–4
34.	(United Kingdom) Tim Henman	7	Tennis Masters Cup, Houston	Hard	RR	6–2, 7–6^{(7–2)}
2005
35.	(Switzerland) Roger Federer	**1**	Australian Open, Melbourne, Australia	Hard	SF	5–7, 6–4, 5–7, 7–6^{(8–6)}, 9–7
36.	(Australia) Lleyton Hewitt	3	Australian Open, Melbourne, Australia	Hard	F	1–6, 6–3, 6–4, 6–4
37.	(Argentina) Guillermo Cañas	8	Halle, Germany	Grass	SF	6–3, 4–6, 6–2
2006
38.	(Russia) Nikolay Davydenko	5	Dubai, United Arab Emirates	Hard	1R	4–6, 6–2, 6–2
39.	(Russia) Nikolay Davydenko	5	Indian Wells, United States	Hard	3R	7–6^{(7–5)}, 3–6, 6–4
40.	(Argentina) Gastón Gaudio	9	Valencia, Spain	Clay	QF	6–4, 6–4
41.	(United States) James Blake	5	Washington, D.C., United States	Hard	3R	7–6^{(8–6)}, 7–6^{(7–5)}
42.	(Argentina) David Nalbandian	4	US Open, New York, United States	Hard	2R	6–3, 7–5, 2–6, 3–6, 7–6^{(8–6)}
43.	(United States) Andy Roddick	6	Davis Cup, Moscow, Russia	Clay (i)	RR	6–4, 6–3, 7–6^{(7–5)}
44.	(Cyprus) Marcos Baghdatis	9	Madrid, Spain	Hard (i)	2R	6–4, 6–3
2008
45.	(Czech Republic) Tomáš Berdych	9	Davis Cup, Moscow, Russia	Clay (i)	RR	6–7^{(5–7)}, 4–6, 6–3, 6–2, 6–4
46.	(Serbia) Novak Djokovic	3	Wimbledon, London, United Kingdom	Grass	2R	6–4, 7–6^{(7–3)}, 6–2
47.	(Switzerland) Stan Wawrinka	9	Wimbledon, London, United Kingdom	Grass	4R	6–4, 6–3, 5–7, 6–1
48.	(Russia) Nikolay Davydenko	5	Moscow, Russia	Hard (i)	QF	7–6^{(7–5)}, 4–6, 6–4
2009
49.	(Russia) Nikolay Davydenko	6	Moscow, Russia	Hard (i)	1R	4–6, 6–4, 6–2
