= 2001 ABN AMRO World Tennis Tournament =

- Date: 19–25 February
- Edition: 29th
- Category: ATP International Series Gold
- Draw: 32S / 16D
- Prize money: $750,000
- Surface: Hardcourt / indoor
- Location: Rotterdam, Netherlands
- Venue: Rotterdam Ahoy

Champions

Singles
- (France) Nicolas Escudé

Doubles
- (Sweden) Jonas Björkman / (Switzerland) Roger Federer
- ABN AMRO World Tennis Tournament

The 2001 ABN AMRO World Tennis Tournament was a men's tennis tournament played on indoor hard courts at Rotterdam Ahoy in the Netherlands and was part of the International Series Gold of the 2001 ATP Tour. The tournament ran from 19 February through 25 February 2001. Nicolas Escudé won the singles title.

The singles line up featured World No. 1, US Open, Canada and Paris Masters champion Marat Safin, Sydney Olympics gold medalist and Moscow champion Yevgeny Kafelnikov and Washington and Toulouse champion Àlex Corretja. Also competing were Vienna and Brighton champion Tim Henman, Australian Open runner-up and Lyon champion Arnaud Clément, Dominik Hrbatý, Sébastien Grosjean and Juan Carlos Ferrero.

== Finals ==
=== Singles ===
(France) Nicolas Escudé defeated (Switzerland) Roger Federer 7–5, 3–6, 7–6^{(7–5)}

- It was Escudé's only title of the year and the 2nd of his career.

=== Doubles ===
(Sweden) Jonas Björkman / (Switzerland) Roger Federer defeated (Czech Republic) Petr Pála / (Czech Republic) Pavel Vízner 6–3, 6–0

- It was Björkman's 2nd title of the year and the 27th of his career. It was Federer's 2nd title of the year and the 2nd of his career.
