= 2000 President's Cup (tennis) =

- Date: 11–17 September
- Edition: 4th
- Category: International Series
- Draw: 32S / 16D
- Prize money: $500,000
- Surface: Hard / outdoor
- Location: Tashkent, Uzbekistan

Champions

Singles
- (Russia) Marat Safin

Doubles
- (United States) Justin Gimelstob / (United States) Scott Humphries
← 1999 ·	ATP Tashkent Open	· 2001 →

The 2000 President's Cup was a men's tennis tournament played on Hard in Tashkent, Uzbekistan that was part of the International Series of the 2000 ATP Tour. It was the fourth edition of the tournament and was held from 11 September until 17 September 2000. Second-seeded Marat Safin won the singles title.

== Finals ==
=== Singles ===
(Russia) Marat Safin defeated (Italy) Davide Sanguinetti, 6–3, 6–4

- It was Safin's 5th singles title of the year and the 6th of his career.

=== Doubles ===
(United States) Justin Gimelstob / (United States) Scott Humphries defeated (South Africa) Marius Barnard / (South Africa) Robbie Koenig, 6–3, 6–2

== See also ==
- 2000 Tashkent Open
