= 2002 ABN AMRO World Tennis Tournament – Doubles =

Doubles
- 2002 ABN AMRO World Tennis Tournament

Final
- Champions: (Switzerland) Roger Federer (Belarus) Max Mirnyi
- Runners-up: (The Bahamas) Mark Knowles (Canada) Daniel Nestor
- Score: 4–6, 6–3, [10–4]

Details
- Draw: 16
- Seeds: 4

Events
Singles	Doubles
- ABN AMRO World Tennis Tournament

Jonas Björkman and Roger Federer were the defending champions but only Federer competed that year with Max Mirnyi.

Federer and Mirnyi won in the final 4–6, 6–3, [10–4] against Mark Knowles and Daniel Nestor.

== Seeds ==
Champion seeds are indicated in bold text while text in italics indicates the round in which those seeds were eliminated.

1. (The Bahamas) Mark Knowles / (Canada) Daniel Nestor (final)
2. (Australia) Joshua Eagle / (Australia) Sandon Stolle (quarterfinals)
3. (Czech Republic) Petr Pála / (Czech Republic) Pavel Vízner (quarterfinals)
4. (Russia) Yevgeny Kafelnikov / (United States) Jeff Tarango (first round)

== Draw ==
Key

- Q = Qualifier
- WC = Wild card
- LL = Lucky loser
- Alt = Alternate
- ITF = ITF entry
- PR = Protected ranking
- SR = Special ranking
- SE = Special exempt
- JE = Junior exempt
- JR = Junior Accelerator Programme entrant
- CO = College Accelerator Programme entrant
- NG = Next Gen Accelerator Program entrant
- w/o = Walkover
- r = Retired
- d = Defaulted

First round
1	(The Bahamas) **M Knowles** (Canada) **D Nestor**	**7^{7}**	**7**
(France) A Clément (France) F Santoro	6^{5}	5
WC	(Netherlands) J Siemerink (Netherlands) D van Scheppingen	6^{2}	**6**	[3]
WC	(France) **S Grosjean** (Germany) **N Kiefer**	**7^{7}**	4	**[10]**
4	(Russia) Y Kafelnikov (United States) J Tarango	**6**	3	[9]
(Spain) **J C Ferrero** (Spain) **T Robredo**	4	**6**	**[11]**
WC	(Netherlands) R Sluiter (Netherlands) J van Lottum	5	2
(France) **N Escudé** (Russia) **M Safin**	**7**	**6**
(Czech Republic) R Štěpánek (Czech Republic) C Suk	**7^{7}**	4	[8]
(Switzerland) **R Federer** **(Belarus) M Mirnyi**	6^{3}	**6**	**[10]**
(South Africa) D Adams (Australia) M Hill	**6**	2	[8]
3	(Czech Republic) **P Pála** (Czech Republic) **P Vízner**	4	**6**	**[10]**
(South Africa) **C Haggard** (Zimbabwe) **K Ullyett**	**6**	**7^{7}**
(Netherlands) P Haarhuis (Netherlands) S Schalken	3	6^{4}
(Czech Republic) T Cibulec (Czech Republic) J Novák	4	**6**	[6]
2	(Australia) **J Eagle** (Australia) **S Stolle**	**6**	4	**[10]**

Quarterfinals
1	(The Bahamas) **M Knowles** (Canada) **D Nestor**	4	**6**	**[10]**
WC	(France) S Grosjean (Germany) N Kiefer	**6**	3	[6]
(Spain) J C Ferrero (Spain) T Robredo	1	4
(France) **N Escudé** (Russia) **M Safin**	**6**	**6**
(Switzerland) **R Federer** (Belarus) **M Mirnyi**	**6**	3	**[10]**
3	(Czech Republic) P Pála (Czech Republic) P Vízner	3	**6**	[6]
(South Africa) **C Haggard** (Zimbabwe) **K Ullyett**	**6**	**7^{7}**
2	(Australia) J Eagle (Australia) S Stolle	4	6^{5}

Semifinals
1	(The Bahamas) **M Knowles** (Canada) **D Nestor**	**w/o**
(France) N Escudé (Russia) M Safin
(Switzerland) **R Federer** (Belarus) **M Mirnyi**	**6**	**6**
(South Africa) C Haggard (Zimbabwe) K Ullyett	3	3

Final
1	(The Bahamas) M Knowles (Canada) D Nestor	**6**	3	[4]
(Switzerland) **R Federer** (Belarus) **M Mirnyi**	4	**6**	**[10]**
