= 2001 Paris Masters – Singles =

Singles
- 2001 Paris Masters

Final
- Champion: (France) Sébastien Grosjean
- Runner-up: (Russia) Yevgeny Kafelnikov
- Score: 7–6^{(7–3)}, 6–1, 6–7^{(5–7)}, 6–4

Details
- Draw: 48 (6 Q / 3 WC)
- Seeds: 16

Events
Singles	Doubles
← 2000 ·	Paris Masters	· 2002 →

Sébastien Grosjean defeated Yevgeny Kafelnikov in the final, 7–6^{(7–3)}, 6–1, 6–7^{(5–7)}, 6–4 to win the singles tennis title at the 2001 Paris Masters.

Marat Safin was the defending champion, but lost in the third round to Andreas Vinciguerra.

== Seeds ==
A champion seed is indicated in bold text while text in italics indicates the round in which that seed was eliminated. All sixteen seeds received a bye into the second round.

1. (Brazil) Gustavo Kuerten (third round)
2. (Australia) Lleyton Hewitt (second round)
3. (Spain) Juan Carlos Ferrero (third round)
4. (Russia) Yevgeny Kafelnikov (final)
5. (Russia) Marat Safin (third round)
6. (France) **Sébastien Grosjean (champion)**
7. (Germany) Tommy Haas (semifinals)
8. (United Kingdom) Tim Henman (second round)
9. (Spain) Àlex Corretja (second round)
10. (Switzerland) Roger Federer (second round)
11. (France) Arnaud Clément (second round)
12. (Croatia) Goran Ivanišević (second round)
13. (United States) Andy Roddick (second round)
14. (Argentina) Guillermo Cañas (second round)
15. (Sweden) Thomas Johansson (quarterfinals)
16. (France) Fabrice Santoro (second round)

== Draw ==
=== Key ===
- Q = Qualifier
- WC = Wild card
- LL = Lucky loser
- Alt = Alternate
- SE = Special exempt
- PR = Protected ranking
- ITF = ITF entry
- JE = Junior exempt
- w/o = Walkover
- r = Retired
- d = Defaulted
- SR = Special ranking

=== Finals ===
Quarterfinals
(Netherlands) Sjeng Schalken	**6**	6^{5}	6^{6}
**(Sweden) Andreas Vinciguerra**	2	**7^{7}**	**7^{8}**
4	**(Russia) Yevgeny Kafelnikov**	**6**	**6**
(Czech Republic) Jiří Novák	3	3
6	**(France) Sébastien Grosjean**	**6**	**6**
(Morocco) Hicham Arazi	2	2
7	**(Germany) Tommy Haas**	4	**6**	**6**
15	(Sweden) Thomas Johansson	**6**	1	3

Semifinals
(Sweden) Andreas Vinciguerra	1	6^{6}
4	**(Russia) Yevgeny Kafelnikov**	**6**	**7^{8}**
6	**(France) Sébastien Grosjean**	**7**	**6**
7	(Germany) Tommy Haas	5	4

Final
4	(Russia) Yevgeny Kafelnikov	6^{3}	1	**7^{7}**	4
6	**(France) Sébastien Grosjean**	**7^{7}**	**6**	6^{5}	**6**

=== Top half ===
==== Section 1 ====
First round
(Czech Republic) **B Ulihrach**	**6**	**6**
Q	(Spain) F Clavet	4	4
Q	(Italy) F Luzzi	4	2
(Netherlands) **S Schalken**	**6**	**6**
(Sweden) **A Vinciguerra**	3	**6**	**6**
(Spain) T Robredo	**6**	1	2
WC	(France) C Pioline	4	**7^{9}**	3
Q	(Slovakia) **K Kučera**	**6**	6^{7}	**6**

Second round
1	(Brazil) **G Kuerten**	**6**	**6**
(Czech Republic) B Ulihrach	2	4
(Netherlands) **S Schalken**	4	**6**	**7**
13	(United States) A Roddick	**6**	3	5
12	(Croatia) G Ivanišević	4	**6**	6^{6}
(Sweden) **A Vinciguerra**	**6**	3	**7^{8}**
Q	(Slovakia) K Kučera	6^{2}	**7**	4
5	(Russia) **M Safin**	**7^{7}**	5	**6**

Third round
1	(Brazil) G Kuerten	**6**	4	4
(Netherlands) **S Schalken**	4	**6**	**6**
(Sweden) **A Vinciguerra**	**6**	**6**
5	(Russia) M Safin	4	4

Quarterfinals
(Netherlands) S Schalken	**6**	6^{5}	6^{6}
(Sweden) **A Vinciguerra**	2	**7^{7}**	**7^{8}**

==== Section 2 ====
First round
Q	(France) N Mahut	3	4
(Australia) **M Philippoussis**	**6**	**6**
(Spain) **A Costa**	**7^{7}**	**6**
WC	(France) M Llodra	6^{3}	1
(Czech Republic) **J Novák**	**6**	**6**
(Spain) A Martín	3	4
(Romania) A Pavel	4	1^{r}
WC	(France) **J Boutter**	**6**	3

Second round
4	(Russia) **Y Kafelnikov**	**7^{7}**	**6**
(Australia) M Philippoussis	6^{2}	4
(Spain) **A Costa**	**7^{7}**	**6**
14	(Argentina) G Cañas	6^{4}	4
10	(Switzerland) R Federer	4	**7^{7}**	6^{2}
(Czech Republic) **J Novák**	**6**	6^{4}	**7^{7}**
WC	(France) **J Boutter**	**6**	**6**
8	(United Kingdom) T Henman	4	3

Third round
4	(Russia) **Y Kafelnikov**	**6**	**6**
(Spain) A Costa	3	4
(Czech Republic) **J Novák**	**6**	**7^{7}**
WC	(France) J Boutter	3	6^{3}

Quarterfinals
4	(Russia) **Y Kafelnikov**	**6**	**6**
(Czech Republic) J Novák	3	3

=== Bottom half ===
==== Section 3 ====
First round
(Slovakia) **D Hrbatý**	**6**	**7^{7}**
(Belarus) M Mirnyi	2	6^{4}
Q	(Belgium) **C Rochus**	**6**	**6**
(South Africa) W Ferreira	3	3
(Morocco) **H Arazi**	**7^{7}**	1	**6**
(Germany) N Kiefer	6^{4}	**6**	3
(Spain) **A Portas**	**6**	**6**
(Argentina) F Squillari	2	3

Second round
6	(France) **S Grosjean**	**6**	**6**
(Slovakia) D Hrbatý	1	4
Q	(Belgium) **C Rochus**	5	**7^{7}**	**6**
9	(Spain) À Corretja	**7**	6^{3}	4
16	(France) F Santoro	4	4
(Morocco) **H Arazi**	**6**	**6**
(Spain) A Portas	3	4
3	(Spain) **J C Ferrero**	**6**	**6**

Third round
6	(France) **S Grosjean**	**6**	3	**6**
Q	(Belgium) C Rochus	0	**6**	0
(Morocco) **H Arazi**	**6**	4	**6**
3	(Spain) J C Ferrero	2	**6**	3

Quarterfinals
6	(France) **S Grosjean**	**6**	**6**
(Morocco) H Arazi	2	2

==== Section 4 ====
First round
(Spain) C Moyá	5	1
(Croatia) **I Ljubičić**	**7**	**6**
(United Kingdom) G Rusedski	6^{3}	4
(Belgium) **X Malisse**	**7^{7}**	**6**
(Sweden) **T Enqvist**	**6**	**6**
(France) N Escudé	2	3
(Ecuador) **N Lapentti**	6^{5}	**7^{7}**	**7**
Q	(France) A Dupuis	**7^{7}**	6^{5}	5

Second round
7	(Germany) **T Haas**	**6**	**6**
(Croatia) I Ljubičić	3	4
(Belgium) **X Malisse**	**6**	3	**7^{7}**
11	(France) A Clément	4	**6**	6^{5}
15	(Sweden) **T Johansson**	**6**	**7^{9}**
(Sweden) T Enqvist	3	6^{7}
(Ecuador) **N Lapentti**	4	**6**	**6**
2	(Australia) L Hewitt	**6**	4	4

Third round
7	(Germany) **T Haas**	**7**	**6**
(Belgium) X Malisse	5	1
15	(Sweden) **T Johansson**	**6**	**6**
(Ecuador) N Lapentti	3	3

Quarterfinals
7	(Germany) **T Haas**	4	**6**	**6**
15	(Sweden) T Johansson	**6**	1	3

== Qualifying ==
=== Qualifying seeds ===
1. (Spain) Félix Mantilla (first round)
2. (Spain) **Francisco Clavet (qualified)**
3. (Spain) Fernando Vicente (first round)
4. (Italy) Andrea Gaudenzi (first round)
5. (Russia) Mikhail Youzhny (first round)
6. (Germany) Lars Burgsmüller (qualifying competition)
7. (France) **Antony Dupuis (qualified)**
8. (Austria) Markus Hipfl (first round, retired)
9. (Italy) Davide Sanguinetti (first round)
10. (Chile) Nicolás Massú (first round)
11. (Paraguay) Ramón Delgado (qualifying competition)
12. (Belgium) **Christophe Rochus (qualified)**

=== Qualifiers ===
1. (Italy) **Federico Luzzi**
2. (Spain) **Francisco Clavet**
3. (France) **Antony Dupuis**
4. (France) **Nicolas Mahut**
5. (Belgium) **Christophe Rochus**
6. (Slovakia) **Karol Kučera**

=== Qualifying draw ===
==== First qualifier ====
First round
1	(Spain) Félix Mantilla	**6**	4	1
**(United States) Michael Russell**	4	**6**	**6**
**(Italy) Federico Luzzi**	**6**	3	**6**
9	(Italy) Davide Sanguinetti	3	**6**	3

Qualifying competition
(United States) Michael Russell	6^{5}	**7^{7}**	3
**(Italy) Federico Luzzi**	**7^{7}**	6^{5}	**6**

==== Second qualifier ====
First round
2	**(Spain) Francisco Clavet**	**6**	**6**
WC	(France) Paul-Henri Mathieu	0	4
(Switzerland) Marc Rosset	3	4
11	**(Paraguay) Ramón Delgado**	**6**	**6**

Qualifying competition
2	**(Spain) Francisco Clavet**	**6**	3	**6**
11	(Paraguay) Ramón Delgado	2	**6**	1

==== Third qualifier ====
First round
3	(Spain) Fernando Vicente	1	3
WC	**(France) Julien Benneteau**	**6**	**6**
(Sweden) Magnus Larsson	4	4
7	**(France) Antony Dupuis**	**6**	**6**

Qualifying competition
WC	(France) Julien Benneteau	4	5
7	**(France) Antony Dupuis**	**6**	**7**

==== Fourth qualifier ====
First round
4	(Italy) Andrea Gaudenzi	6^{3}	6^{11}
WC	**(France) Nicolas Mahut**	**7^{7}**	**7^{13}**
WC	**(France) Sébastien de Chaunac**	**6**
8	(Austria) Markus Hipfl	1	r

Qualifying competition
WC	**(France) Nicolas Mahut**	**7**	**6**
WC	(France) Sébastien de Chaunac	5	3

==== Fifth qualifier ====
First round
5	(Russia) Mikhail Youzhny	6^{5}	**7**	2
**(Hungary) Attila Sávolt**	**7^{7}**	5	**6**
(Romania) Adrian Voinea	**7**	0^{r}
12	**(Belgium) Christophe Rochus**	5	2

Qualifying competition
(Hungary) Attila Sávolt	**6**	3	4
12	**(Belgium) Christophe Rochus**	1	**6**	**6**

==== Sixth qualifier ====
First round
6	**(Germany) Lars Burgsmüller**	**6**	**6**
(Croatia) Ivo Karlović	4	4
**(Slovakia) Karol Kučera**	**6**	**6**
10	(Chile) Nicolás Massú	4	4

Qualifying competition
6	(Germany) Lars Burgsmüller	3	1
**(Slovakia) Karol Kučera**	**6**	**6**
