= 2001 ABN AMRO World Tennis Tournament – Doubles =

Doubles
- 2001 ABN AMRO World Tennis Tournament

Final
- Champions: (Sweden) Jonas Björkman (Switzerland) Roger Federer
- Runners-up: (Czech Republic) Petr Pála (Czech Republic) Pavel Vízner
- Score: 6–3, 6–0

Details
- Draw: 16
- Seeds: 4

Events
Singles	Doubles
- ABN AMRO World Tennis Tournament

David Adams and John-Laffnie de Jager were the defending champions but only Adams competed that year with Marius Barnard.

Adams and Barnard lost in the first round to Dominik Hrbatý and David Prinosil.

Jonas Björkman and Roger Federer won in the final 6–3, 6–0 against Petr Pála and Pavel Vízner.

== Seeds ==
Champion seeds are indicated in bold text while text in italics indicates the round in which those seeds were eliminated.

1. (Russia) Yevgeny Kafelnikov / (Belarus) Max Mirnyi (first round)
2. (Czech Republic) Jiří Novák / (Czech Republic) David Rikl (quarterfinals)
3. (Australia) Joshua Eagle / (Australia) Sandon Stolle (first round)
4. (Slovakia) Dominik Hrbatý / (Germany) David Prinosil (quarterfinals)

== Draw ==
Key

- Q = Qualifier
- WC = Wild card
- LL = Lucky loser
- Alt = Alternate
- ITF = ITF entry
- PR = Protected ranking
- SR = Special ranking
- SE = Special exempt
- JE = Junior exempt
- JR = Junior Accelerator Programme entrant
- CO = College Accelerator Programme entrant
- NG = Next Gen Accelerator Program entrant
- w/o = Walkover
- r = Retired
- d = Defaulted

First round
1	(Russia) Y Kafelnikov (Belarus) M Mirnyi	6^{11}	**7^{7}**	3
(Zimbabwe) **W Black** (Zimbabwe) **K Ullyett**	**7^{13}**	6^{5}	**6**
(Russia) **A Olhovskiy** (Czech Republic) **C Suk**	**7^{7}**	4	**7**
(Germany) J Knippschild (United States) J Tarango	6^{5}	**6**	5
4	(Slovakia) **D Hrbatý** (Germany) **D Prinosil**	**6**	1	**6**
(South Africa) D Adams (South Africa) M Barnard	4	**6**	4
(Sweden) **J Björkman** (Switzerland) **R Federer**	**6**	1	**6**
(Czech Republic) T Cibulec (Czech Republic) L Friedl	1	**6**	0
(South Africa) C Haggard (Belgium) T Vanhoudt	4	**6**	3
Q	(France) **N Escudé** (Switzerland) **M Rosset**	**6**	3	**6**
WC	(Germany) **N Kiefer** (Russia) **M Safin**	**6**	**6**
3	(Australia) J Eagle (Australia) S Stolle	4	0
(Czech Republic) **P Pála** (Czech Republic) **P Vízner**	**6**	**6**
WC	(Netherlands) S Groen (Netherlands) J Siemerink	3	4
WC	(Netherlands) S Schalken (Netherlands) R Sluiter	1	4
2	(Czech Republic) **J Novák** (Czech Republic) **D Rikl**	**6**	**6**

Quarterfinals
(Zimbabwe) **W Black** (Zimbabwe) **K Ullyett**	6^{6}	**7^{8}**	**6**
(Russia) A Olhovskiy (Czech Republic) C Suk	**7^{8}**	6^{6}	3
4	(Slovakia) D Hrbatý (Germany) D Prinosil
(Sweden) **J Björkman** (Switzerland) **R Federer**	**w/o**
Q	(France) N Escudé (Switzerland) M Rosset	4	4
WC	(Germany) **N Kiefer** (Russia) **M Safin**	**6**	**6**
(Czech Republic) **P Pála** (Czech Republic) **P Vízner**	3	**6**	**7^{7}**
2	(Czech Republic) J Novák (Czech Republic) D Rikl	**6**	4	6^{3}

Semifinals
(Zimbabwe) W Black (Zimbabwe) K Ullyett	3	**6**	1
(Sweden) **J Björkman** (Switzerland) **R Federer**	**6**	3	**6**
WC	(Germany) N Kiefer (Russia) M Safin	3	6^{5}
(Czech Republic) **P Pála** (Czech Republic) **P Vízner**	**6**	**7^{7}**

Final
(Sweden) **Jonas Björkman** (Switzerland) **Roger Federer**	**6**	**6**
(Czech Republic) Petr Pála (Czech Republic) Pavel Vízner	3	0
