= 2002 BNP Paribas Masters – Doubles =

Doubles
- 2002 BNP Paribas Masters
- 2001 Champions: (South Africa) Ellis Ferreira (United States) Rick Leach

Final
- Champions: (France) Nicolas Escudé (France) Fabrice Santoro
- Runners-up: (Brazil) Gustavo Kuerten (France) Cédric Pioline
- Score: 6–3, 7–6^{(8–6)}

Details
- Draw: 24
- Seeds: 8

Events
Singles	Doubles
← 2001 ·	BNP Paribas Masters	· 2003 →

Ellis Ferreira and Rick Leach were the defending champions but they competed with different partners that year, Ferreira with Pavel Vízner and Leach with Brian MacPhie.

Ferreira and Vízner lost in the quarterfinals to Leach and MacPhie.

Leach and MacPhie lost in the semifinals to Nicolas Escudé and Fabrice Santoro.

Escudé and Santoro won in the final 6–3, 7–6^{(8–6)} against Gustavo Kuerten and Cédric Pioline.

== Seeds ==
Champion seeds are indicated in bold text while text in italics indicates the round in which those seeds were eliminated. All eight seeded teams received byes to the second round.

1. (The Bahamas) Mark Knowles / (Canada) Daniel Nestor (quarterfinals)
2. (India) Mahesh Bhupathi / (Belarus) Max Mirnyi (second round)
3. (Sweden) Jonas Björkman / (Australia) Todd Woodbridge (semifinals)
4. (United States) Bob Bryan / (United States) Mike Bryan (second round)
5. (Russia) Yevgeny Kafelnikov / (United States) Jared Palmer (second round)
6. (Zimbabwe) Wayne Black / (Zimbabwe) Kevin Ullyett (second round)
7. (Czech Republic) Martin Damm / (Czech Republic) Cyril Suk (second round)
8. (Australia) Joshua Eagle / (Australia) Sandon Stolle (second round)

== Draw ==
=== Key ===
- Q = Qualifier
- WC = Wild card
- LL = Lucky loser
- Alt = Alternate
- SE = Special exempt
- PR = Protected ranking
- ITF = ITF entry
- JE = Junior exempt
- w/o = Walkover
- r = Retired
- d = Defaulted
- SR = Special ranking

=== Final ===
Final

WC
- (Brazil) Gustavo Kuerten
- (France) Cédric Pioline
3
6^{6}

WC
- (France) **Nicolas Escudé**
- (France) **Fabrice Santoro**
**6**
**7^{8}**

=== Top half ===
First round

Second round

Quarterfinals

Semifinals

1
- (The Bahamas) **M Knowles**
- (Canada) **D Nestor**
**6**
**7^{7}**

(United States) G Oliver
(Federal Republic of Yugoslavia) N Zimonjić
6^{4}
3

- (South Africa) D Adams
- (South Africa) R Koenig
2
6^{2}

- (South Africa) **D Adams**
- (South Africa) **R Koenig**
**7^{7}**
**6**

1
- (The Bahamas) M Knowles
- (Canada) D Nestor
4
6^{3}

- (Ecuador) N Lapentti
- (Argentina) D Nalbandian
5
4

WC
- (Brazil) **G Kuerten**
- (France) **C Pioline**
**6**
**7^{7}**

WC
- (Brazil) **G Kuerten**
- (France) **C Pioline**
**7**
**6**

WC
- (Brazil) **G Kuerten**
- (France) **C Pioline**
**7**
**6**

7
- (Czech Republic) M Damm
- (Czech Republic) C Suk
5
3

WC
- (Brazil) **G Kuerten**
- (France) **C Pioline**
6^{8}
**6**
**6**

3
- (Sweden) J Björkman
- (Australia) T Woodbridge
**7^{10}**
4
3

3
- (Sweden) **J Björkman**
- (Australia) **T Woodbridge**
**6**
**6**

- (Argentina) L Arnold
- (Argentina) G Etlis
4
5

- (Australia) M Hill
- (India) L Paes
2
0

- (Australia) **M Hill**
- (India) **L Paes**
**6**
**7**

3
- (Sweden) **J Björkman**
- (Australia) **T Woodbridge**
**6**
**6**

- (Finland) **J Nieminen**
- (Romania) **A Pavel**
**7^{7}**
**6**

- (Finland) J Nieminen
- (Romania) A Pavel
4
1

- (Netherlands) S Schalken
- (Germany) R Schüttler
6^{3}
2

- (Finland) **J Nieminen**
- (Romania) **A Pavel**
**6**
**6**

8
- (Australia) J Eagle
- (Australia) S Stolle
1
3

=== Bottom half ===
First round

Second round

Quarterfinals

Semifinals

6
- (Zimbabwe) W Black
- (Zimbabwe) K Ullyett
4
4

- (Czech Republic) T Cibulec
- (Czech Republic) R Štěpánek
1
4

- (France) **A Clément**
- (France) **M Llodra**
**6**
**6**

- (France) **A Clément**
- (France) **M Llodra**
**6**
**6**

- (France) A Clément
- (France) M Llodra
4
4

WC
- (France) **N Escudé**
- (France) **F Santoro**
**6**
**6**

WC
- (France) **N Escudé**
- (France) **F Santoro**
**6**
**6**

ALT
- (South Africa) J Coetzee
- (South Africa) C Haggard
1
0

WC
- (France) **N Escudé**
- (France) **F Santoro**
**6**
**7^{8}**

4
- (United States) B Bryan
- (United States) M Bryan
2
6^{6}

WC
- (France) **N Escudé**
- (France) **F Santoro**
4

- (United States) R Leach
- (United States) B MacPhie
5^{r}

5
- (Russia) Y Kafelnikov
- (United States) J Palmer
3
3

- (South Africa) **E Ferreira**
- (Czech Republic) **P Vízner**
**7**
**6**

- (South Africa) **E Ferreira**
- (Czech Republic) **P Vízner**
**6**
**6**

- (Czech Republic) P Pála
- (Czech Republic) D Rikl
5
2

- (South Africa) E Ferreira
- (Czech Republic) P Vízner
**6**
6^{11}
6^{2}

- (United States) **R Leach**
- (United States) **B MacPhie**
**6**
**6**

- (United States) **R Leach**
- (United States) **B MacPhie**
3
**7^{13}**
**7^{7}**

- (Chile) F González
- (United States) A Roddick
3
4

- (United States) **R Leach**
- (United States) **B MacPhie**
**7^{7}**
6^{5}
**7^{7}**

2
- (India) M Bhupathi
- (Belarus) M Mirnyi
6^{3}
**7^{7}**
6^{2}
