= 2002 ABN AMRO World Tennis Tournament – Singles =

Singles
- 2002 ABN AMRO World Tennis Tournament

Final
- Champion: (France) Nicolas Escudé
- Runner-up: (United Kingdom) Tim Henman
- Score: 3–6, 7–6^{(9–7)}, 6–4

Details
- Draw: 32
- Seeds: 8

Events
Singles	Doubles
- ABN AMRO World Tennis Tournament

Nicolas Escudé was the defending champion and won in the final 3–6, 7–6^{(9–7)}, 6–4 against Tim Henman.

== Seeds ==
A champion seed is indicated in bold text while text in italics indicates the round in which that seed was eliminated.

1. (Spain) Juan Carlos Ferrero (first round)
2. (Russia) Yevgeny Kafelnikov (second round)
3. (Russia) Marat Safin (second round)
4. (France) Sébastien Grosjean (semifinals)
5. (Sweden) Thomas Johansson (second round)
6. (United Kingdom) Tim Henman (final)
7. (Switzerland) Roger Federer (quarterfinals)
8. (Croatia) Goran Ivanišević (first round)

== Draw ==
Key

- Q = Qualifier
- WC = Wild card
- LL = Lucky loser
- Alt = Alternate
- ITF = ITF entry
- PR = Protected ranking
- SR = Special ranking
- SE = Special exempt
- JE = Junior exempt
- JR = Junior Accelerator Programme entrant
- CO = College Accelerator Programme entrant
- NG = Next Gen Accelerator Program entrant
- w/o = Walkover
- r = Retired
- d = Defaulted

First round
1	(Spain) J C Ferrero	**7**	1	0
(France) **N Escudé**	5	**6**	**6**
(Spain) **T Robredo**	**6**	**6**
Q	(Russia) M Youzhny	2	4
(Sweden) **T Enqvist**	**6**	**6**
(Romania) A Pavel	2	3
WC	(Netherlands) J van Lottum	3	4
7	(Switzerland) **R Federer**	**6**	**6**
4	(France) **S Grosjean**	**7^{12}**	**7^{7}**
WC	(Netherlands) R Sluiter	6^{10}	6^{5}
(Netherlands) S Schalken	6^{0}	6^{0}
Q	(United Kingdom) **M Lee**	**7^{7}**	**7^{7}**
(France) **A Clément**	**6**	**7^{7}**
(United Kingdom) G Rusedski	3	6^{4}
(Morocco) H Arazi	4	4
5	(Sweden) **T Johansson**	**6**	**6**
6	(United Kingdom) **T Henman**	**6**	**6**
(Germany) N Kiefer	2	2
WC	(Netherlands) M Verkerk	**6**	3	4
(France) **F Santoro**	1	**6**	**6**
(Switzerland) M Kratochvil	**6**	5	2
(Czech Republic) **B Ulihrach**	3	**7**	**6**
(Slovakia) D Hrbatý	6^{4}	6^{4}
3	(Russia) **M Safin**	**7^{7}**	**7^{7}**
8	(Croatia) G Ivanišević	6^{3}	4
Q	(Switzerland) **I Heuberger**	**7^{7}**	**6**
(Belarus) **M Mirnyi**	**6**	**6**
(Czech Republic) J Novák	3	2
Q	(Netherlands) J Siemerink	**7^{8}**	6^{6}	6^{7}
(Croatia) **I Ljubičić**	6^{6}	**7^{8}**	**7^{9}**
(France) J Boutter	3	5
2	(Russia) **Y Kafelnikov**	**6**	**7**

Second round
(France) **N Escudé**	**6**	**6**
(Spain) T Robredo	1	2
(Sweden) T Enqvist
7	(Switzerland) **R Federer**	w/o
4	(France) **S Grosjean**	**6**	**6**
Q	(United Kingdom) M Lee	0	2
(France) **A Clément**	**6**	**6**
5	(Sweden) T Johansson	2	3
6	(United Kingdom) **T Henman**	**7**	4	**7**
(France) F Santoro	5	**6**	5
(Czech Republic) **B Ulihrach**	1	**6**	**6**
3	(Russia) M Safin	**6**	3	2
Q	(Switzerland) **I Heuberger**	**7^{7}**	**6**
(Belarus) M Mirnyi	6^{2}	2
(Croatia) **I Ljubičić**	**7^{7}**	4	**6**
2	(Russia) Y Kafelnikov	6^{4}	**6**	3

Quarterfinals
(France) **N Escudé**	3	**7^{10}**	**7**
7	(Switzerland) R Federer	**6**	6^{8}	5
4	(France) **S Grosjean**	**7^{10}**	**6**
(France) A Clément	6^{8}	3
6	(United Kingdom) **T Henman**	**7**	**6**
(Czech Republic) B Ulihrach	5	3
Q	(Switzerland) I Heuberger	3	**6**	3
(Croatia) **I Ljubičić**	**6**	3	**6**

Semifinals
(France) **N Escudé**	4	**7^{7}**	**7**
4	(France) S Grosjean	**6**	6^{1}	5
6	(United Kingdom) **T Henman**	**7**	**6**
(Croatia) I Ljubičić	5	4

Final
(France) **Nicolas Escudé**	3	**7^{9}**	**6**
6	(United Kingdom) Tim Henman	**6**	6^{7}	4
