= 2001 ABN AMRO World Tennis Tournament – Singles =

Singles
- 2001 ABN AMRO World Tennis Tournament

Final
- Champion: (France) Nicolas Escudé
- Runner-up: (Switzerland) Roger Federer
- Score: 7–5, 3–6, 7–6^{(7–5)}

Details
- Draw: 32
- Seeds: 8

Events
| Singles | Doubles |
- ABN AMRO World Tennis Tournament

Cédric Pioline was the defending champion but lost in the first round to Andreas Vinciguerra.

Nicolas Escudé won in the final 7–5, 3–6, 7–6^{(7–5)} against Roger Federer.

== Seeds ==
A champion seed is indicated in bold text while text in italics indicates the round in which that seed was eliminated.

1. (Russia) Marat Safin (first round)
2. (Russia) Yevgeny Kafelnikov (second round)
3. (Spain) Àlex Corretja (quarterfinals)
4. (United Kingdom) Tim Henman (second round)
5. (France) Arnaud Clément (second round)
6. (Slovakia) Dominik Hrbatý (second round)
7. (France) Sébastien Grosjean (second round)
8. (Spain) Juan Carlos Ferrero (first round)

== Draw ==
Key

- Q = Qualifier
- WC = Wild card
- LL = Lucky loser
- Alt = Alternate
- ITF = ITF entry
- PR = Protected ranking
- SR = Special ranking
- SE = Special exempt
- JE = Junior exempt
- JR = Junior Accelerator Programme entrant
- CO = College Accelerator Programme entrant
- NG = Next Gen Accelerator Program entrant
- w/o = Walkover
- r = Retired
- d = Defaulted

First round
1 | (Russia) M Safin | **7^{9}** | 4 | 3
(Belarus) **M Mirnyi** | 6^{7} | **6** | **6**
(Sweden) **A Vinciguerra** | 4 | **6** | **6**
(France) C Pioline | **6** | 4 | 4
(Czech Republic) B Ulihrach | **6** | 5 | 1
(Belarus) **V Voltchkov** | 4 | **7** | **6**
(Sweden) T Johansson | 3 | 4
6 | (Slovakia) **D Hrbatý** | **6** | **6**
4 | (United Kingdom) **T Henman** | 4 | **6** | **6**
Q | (Germany) J Knippschild | **6** | 3 | 4
(Sweden) J Björkman | 0 | 4
Q | (France) **N Escudé** | **6** | **6**
(France) F Santoro | **6** | 1 | 3
WC | (Netherlands) **R Sluiter** | 4 | **6** | **6**
Q | (Croatia) **I Ljubičić** | **7^{7}** | **6**
8 | (Spain) J C Ferrero | 6^{2} | 4
7 | (France) **S Grosjean** | **6** | **6**
(Italy) G Pozzi | 3 | 4
(Switzerland) **R Federer** | **7^{7}** | **6**
(Australia) A Ilie | 6^{5} | 1
(Germany) D Prinosil | **6** | 5 | 6^{2}
(Netherlands) **S Schalken** | 4 | **7** | **7^{7}**
WC | (Netherlands) J Siemerink | **6** | 6^{4} | 6^{6}
3 | (Spain) **À Corretja** | 4 | **7^{7}** | **7^{8}**
5 | (France) **A Clément** | **6** | 3 | **6**
(Switzerland) M Rosset | 3 | **6** | 3
WC | (Netherlands) P Wessels | **6** | 4 | 3
(Romania) **A Pavel** | 4 | **6** | **6**
(Czech Republic) J Novák | 2 | 4
(Germany) **N Kiefer** | **6** | **6**
Q | (Czech Republic) C Doseděl | 2 | 2
2 | (Russia) **Y Kafelnikov** | **6** | **6**

Second round
(Belarus) M Mirnyi | **7^{7}** | 5 | 6^{5}
(Sweden) **A Vinciguerra** | 6^{2} | **7** | **7^{7}**
(Belarus) **V Voltchkov** | **6** | 1 | **7^{7}**
6 | (Slovakia) D Hrbatý | 2 | **6** | 6^{2}
4 | (United Kingdom) T Henman | 3 | 5
Q | (France) **N Escudé** | **6** | **7**
WC | (Netherlands) R Sluiter | 6^{8} | **6** | 4
Q | (Croatia) **I Ljubičić** | **7^{10}** | 4 | **6**
7 | (France) S Grosjean | **6** | 3 | 4
(Switzerland) **R Federer** | 4 | **6** | **6**
(Netherlands) S Schalken | 4 | **6** | 1
3 | (Spain) **À Corretja** | **6** | 4 | **6**
5 | (France) A Clément | 4 | 4
(Romania) **A Pavel** | **6** | **6**
(Germany) **N Kiefer** | **6** | **6**
2 | (Russia) Y Kafelnikov | 4 | 2

Quarterfinals
(Sweden) A Vinciguerra | **7** | 1 | 3
(Belarus) **V Voltchkov** | 5 | **6** | **6**
Q | (France) **N Escudé** | **6** | **6**
Q | (Croatia) I Ljubičić | 3 | 1
(Switzerland) **R Federer** | **6** | **6**
3 | (Spain) À Corretja | 4 | 2
(Romania) **A Pavel** | **6** | **6**
(Germany) N Kiefer | 4 | 4

Semifinals
(Belarus) V Voltchkov | 4 | 1
Q | (France) **N Escudé** | **6** | **6**
(Switzerland) **R Federer** | 6^{4} | **6** | **6**
(Romania) A Pavel | **7^{7}** | 4 | 0

Final
Q | (France) **Nicolas Escudé** | **7** | 3 | **7^{7}**
(Switzerland) Roger Federer | 5 | **6** | 6^{5}

== Seeds ==
1. (France) **Nicolas Escudé (qualified)**
2. (Czech Republic) **Sláva Doseděl (qualified)**
3. (Croatia) **Ivan Ljubičić (qualified)**
4. (Germany) **Jens Knippschild (qualified)**
5. (Canada) Rogier Wassen (first round)
6. (Germany) Tomas Behrend (second round)
7. (Finland) Tuomas Ketola (second round)
8. (Slovakia) Ján Krošlák (second round)

== Qualified ==
1. (France) Nicolas Escudé
2. (Czech Republic) Sláva Doseděl
3. (Croatia) Ivan Ljubičić
4. (Germany) Jens Knippschild

=== First qualifier ===
First round
6 | **(Germany) Tomas Behrend** | **6** | 6^{6} | **7**
(Sweden) Fredrik Giers | 4 | **7** | 6^{8}

Second round
1 | **(France) Nicolas Escudé** | **6** | **6**
6 | (Germany) Tomas Behrend | 1 | 3

=== Second qualifier ===
First round
7 | **(Finland) Tuomas Ketola** | **6** | **6**
(Australia) Steven Randjelovic | 2 | 1

Second round
2 | **(Czech Republic) Sláva Doseděl** | **6** | **7**
7 | (Finland) Tuomas Ketola | 2 | 5

=== Third qualifier ===
First round
8 | **(Slovakia) Ján Krošlák** | **7** | 3 | **6**
(Germany) Karsten Braasch | 5 | **6** | 3

Second round
3 | **(Croatia) Ivan Ljubičić** | **6** | **6**
8 | (Slovakia) Ján Krošlák | 4 | 3

=== Fourth qualifier ===
First round
4 | **(Germany) Jens Knippschild** | **6** | **6**
(Italy) Fabio Maggi | 4 | 1
**(Netherlands) Rogier Wassen** | 5 | **6** | **6**
5 | (Canada) Daniel Nestor | **7** | 4 | 4

Second round
4 | **(Germany) Jens Knippschild** | **6** | **6**
(Netherlands) Rogier Wassen | 1 | 2
