= 2000 President's Cup – Doubles =

Doubles
- 2000 President's Cup

Final
- Champions: (United States) Justin Gimelstob (United States) Scott Humphries
- Runners-up: (South Africa) Marius Barnard (South Africa) Robbie Koenig
- Score: 6–3, 6–2

Events
Singles	Doubles
← 1999 ·	President's Cup	· 2001 →

The 2000 President's Cup was a men's tennis tournament played on Hard in Tashkent, Uzbekistan that was part of the International Series of the 2000 ATP Tour. It was the fourth edition of the tournament and was held from 11 September – 17 September.

== Seeds ==
Champion seeds are indicated in bold text while text in italics indicates the round in which those seeds were eliminated.

1. (United States) **Justin Gimelstob** / (United States) **Scott Humphries (champions)**
2. (South Africa) Marius Barnard / (South Africa) Robbie Koenig (final)
3. (Socialist Federal Republic of Yugoslavia) Dušan Vemić / (Socialist Federal Republic of Yugoslavia) Nenad Zimonjić (quarterfinals)
4. (Australia) David Macpherson / (South Africa) Grant Stafford (quarterfinals)

== Draw ==
=== Key ===
- Q = Qualifier
- WC = Wild card
- LL = Lucky loser
- Alt = Alternate
- ITF = ITF entry
- PR = Protected ranking
- SR = Special ranking
- SE = Special exempt
- JE = Junior exempt
- JR = Junior Accelerator Programme entrant
- CO = College Accelerator Programme entrant
- NG = Next Gen Accelerator Program entrant
- w/o = Walkover
- r = Retired
- d = Defaulted

=== Finals ===
First round
1	(United States) **J Gimelstob** **(United States) S Humphries**	**7**	**7**
(Australia) P Hanley (Finland) T Ketola	5	6^{5}
(Uzbekistan) **V Kutsenko** **(Israel) N Welgreen**	**7**	1	**7**
(Israel) J Erlich (Israel) H Levy	6^{13}	**6**	5
4	(Australia) **D Macpherson** **(South Africa) G Stafford**	**7**	**7**
(Switzerland) L Manta (Italy) L Tieleman	6^{3}	6^{7}
(United States) **P Goldstein** **(United States) J Thomas**	**6**	3	**7**
(France) J Boutter (France) J Golmard	3	**6**	6^{6}
(Netherlands) **S Groen** **(Netherlands) J Siemerink**	**6**	**6**
(Russia) D Golovanov (Uzbekistan) A-H Makhkamov	2	4
3	(Socialist Federal Republic of Yugoslavia) **D Vemić** **(Socialist Federal Republic of Yugoslavia) N Zimonjić**	**6**	**6**
(South Africa) P Rosner (South Africa) J Weir-Smith	2	4
(United States) **M Sprengelmeyer** **(South Africa) M Wakefield**	**6**	**7**
(Uzbekistan) O Ogorodov (Armenia) S Sargsian	3	5
2	(South Africa) **M Barnard** **(South Africa) R Koenig**	**7**	**6**
(Uzbekistan) D Tomashevich (Russia) M Youzhny	6^{3}	2

Quarterfinals
1	(United States) **J Gimelstob** **(United States) S Humphries**	**6**	**6**
(Uzbekistan) V Kutsenko (Israel) N Welgreen	1	4
4	(Australia) D Macpherson (South Africa) G Stafford	**7**	3	4
(United States) **P Goldstein** **(United States) J Thomas**	5	**6**	**6**
(Netherlands) **S Groen** **(Netherlands) J Siemerink**	**7**	**6**
3	(Socialist Federal Republic of Yugoslavia) D Vemić (Socialist Federal Republic of Yugoslavia) N Zimonjić	6^{5}	3
(United States) M Sprengelmeyer (South Africa) M Wakefield	6^{4}	**6**	5
2	(South Africa) **M Barnard** **(South Africa) R Koenig**	**7**	4	**7**

Semifinals
1	(United States) **J Gimelstob** **(United States) S Humphries**	6^{5}	**7**	**7**
(United States) P Goldstein (United States) J Thomas	**7**	6^{4}	5
(Netherlands) S Groen (Netherlands) J Siemerink	6^{3}	3
2	(South Africa) **M Barnard** **(South Africa) R Koenig**	**7**	**6**

Final
1	(United States) **J Gimelstob** **(United States) S Humphries**	**6**	**6**
2	(South Africa) M Barnard (South Africa) R Koenig	3	2
