= 2001 President's Cup – Doubles =

Doubles
- 2001 President's Cup

Final
- Champions: (France) Julien Boutter (Slovakia) Dominik Hrbatý
- Runners-up: (South Africa) Marius Barnard (United States) Jim Thomas
- Score: 6–4, 3–6, [13–11]

Events
Singles	Doubles
← 2000 ·	President's Cup	· 2002 →

Justin Gimelstob and Scott Humphries were the defending champions but did not compete that year.

Julien Boutter and Dominik Hrbatý won in the final 6–4, 3–6, [13–11] against Marius Barnard and Jim Thomas.

== Seeds ==
Champion seeds are indicated in bold text while text in italics indicates the round in which those seeds were eliminated.

1. (Japan) Thomas Shimada / (South Africa) Myles Wakefield (first round)
2. (South Africa) Marius Barnard / (United States) Jim Thomas (final)
3. (France) **Julien Boutter** / (Slovakia) **Dominik Hrbatý (champions)**
4. (Czech Republic) Tomáš Cibulec / (Czech Republic) Petr Luxa (first round)

== Draw ==
=== Key ===
- Q = Qualifier
- WC = Wild card
- LL = Lucky loser
- Alt = Alternate
- SE = Special exempt
- PR = Protected ranking
- ITF = ITF entry
- JE = Junior exempt
- w/o = Walkover
- r = Retired
- d = Defaulted
- SR = Special ranking

=== Finals ===
First round
1	(Japan) T Shimada (South Africa) M Wakefield	3	**6**	3
WC	(Germany) **R Schüttler** (Russia) **M Youzhny**	**6**	4	**6**
(Israel) N Behr (Israel) H Levy	**7^{11}**	0	3
(Netherlands) **S Schalken** (Netherlands) **J Siemerink**	6^{9}	**6**	**6**
3	(France) **J Boutter** (Slovakia) **D Hrbatý**	4	**6**	**6**
WC	(Germany) L Burgsmüller (Germany) N Kiefer	**6**	1	2
(Australia) P Hanley (United States) J Waite	5	6^{5}
(South Africa) **J-L de Jager** (South Africa) **R Koenig**	**7**	**7^{7}**
(Switzerland) **M Rosset** (Russia) **M Safin**	**6**	2	**6**
(Israel) J Erlich (Israel) A Ram	4	**6**	3
WC	(Uzbekistan) **O Ogorodov** (Czech Republic) **D Vacek**	**6**	**6**
4	(Czech Republic) T Cibulec (Czech Republic) P Luxa	1	2
(Netherlands) S Groen (Uzbekistan) V Kutsenko	**7^{7}**	4	2
WC	(Russia) **D Golovanov** (Russia) **Y Kafelnikov**	6^{5}	**6**	**6**
(United States) P Goldstein (Finland) T Ketola	6^{6}	**6**	3
2	(South Africa) **M Barnard** (United States) **J Thomas**	**7^{8}**	3	**6**

Quarterfinals
WC	(Germany) R Schüttler (Russia) M Youzhny	**6**	5	6^{5}
(Netherlands) **S Schalken** (Netherlands) **J Siemerink**	4	**7**	**7^{7}**
3	(France) **J Boutter** (Slovakia) **D Hrbatý**	3	**7^{7}**	**6**
(South Africa) J-L de Jager (South Africa) R Koenig	**6**	6^{2}	4
(Switzerland) M Rosset (Russia) M Safin	**6**	6^{5}	2
WC	(Uzbekistan) **O Ogorodov** (Czech Republic) **D Vacek**	4	**7^{7}**	**6**
WC	(Russia) D Golovanov (Russia) Y Kafelnikov	3	**6**	4
2	(South Africa) **M Barnard** (United States) **J Thomas**	**6**	2	**6**

Semifinals
(Netherlands) S Schalken (Netherlands) J Siemerink	**6**	3	4
3	(France) **J Boutter** (Slovakia) **D Hrbatý**	4	**6**	**6**
WC	(Uzbekistan) O Ogorodov (Czech Republic) D Vacek	6^{1}	**6**	1
2	(South Africa) **M Barnard** (United States) **J Thomas**	**7^{7}**	1	**6**

Final
3	(France) **Julien Boutter** (Slovakia) **Dominik Hrbatý**	**6**	3	**[13]**
2	(South Africa) Marius Barnard (United States) Jim Thomas	4	**6**	[11]
