= 2000 Paris Masters – Doubles =

Doubles
- 2000 Paris Masters

Final
- Champions: (Sweden) Nicklas Kulti; (Belarus) Max Mirnyi
- Runners-up: (Netherlands) Paul Haarhuis; (Canada) Daniel Nestor
- Score: 6–4, 7–5

Details
- Draw: 24
- Seeds: 8

Events
Singles	Doubles
← 1999 ·	Paris Masters	· 2001 →

Sébastien Lareau and Alex O'Brien were the defending champions. Lareau did not participate this year. O'Brien partnered Jared Palmer, losing in the semifinals.

Nicklas Kulti and Max Mirnyi won in the final 6–4, 7–5, against Paul Haarhuis and Daniel Nestor.

== Seeds ==
All seeds receive a bye into the second round.

1. (South Africa) Ellis Ferreira / (United States) Rick Leach (second round)
2. (United States) Alex O'Brien / (United States) Jared Palmer (semifinals)
3. (Czech Republic) Jiří Novák / (Czech Republic) David Rikl (second round)
4. (South Africa) Wayne Ferreira / (Russia) Yevgeny Kafelnikov (second round)
5. (Sweden) Nicklas Kulti / (Belarus) Max Mirnyi (champions)
6. (Netherlands) Paul Haarhuis / (Canada) Daniel Nestor (final)
7. (South Africa) David Adams / (South Africa) John-Laffnie de Jager (quarterfinals, retired)
8. (Switzerland) Roger Federer / (Slovakia) Dominik Hrbatý (second round)

== Draw ==
=== Key ===
- Q = Qualifier
- WC = Wild card
- LL = Lucky loser
- Alt = Alternate
- SE = Special exempt
- PR = Protected ranking
- ITF = ITF entry
- JE = Junior exempt
- w/o = Walkover
- r = Retired
- d = Defaulted
- SR = Special ranking

=== Finals ===
Semifinals

Final

- (Argentina) Martín García
- (Italy) Diego Nargiso
6
4
3

6
- (Netherlands) Paul Haarhuis
- (Canada) Daniel Nestor
4
6
6

6
- (Netherlands) Paul Haarhuis
- (Canada) Daniel Nestor
4
5

5
- (Sweden) Nicklas Kulti
- (Belarus) Max Mirnyi
6
7

5
- (Sweden) Nicklas Kulti
- (Belarus) Max Mirnyi
5
7
6

2
- (United States) Alex O'Brien
- (United States) Jared Palmer
7
5
4

=== Top half ===
First round

Second round

Quarterfinals

Semifinals

1
- (South Africa) E Ferreira
- (United States) R Leach
5
7^{7}
6^{5}

- (South Africa) M Barnard
- (South Africa) R Koenig
6^{4}
3

- (Argentina) M García
- (Italy) D Nargiso
7
6^{2}
7^{7}

- (Argentina) M García
- (Italy) D Nargiso
7^{7}
6

- (Argentina) M García
- (Italy) D Nargiso
3

- (India) M Bhupathi
- (United States) S Humphries
3
4

7
- (South Africa) D Adams
- (South Africa) J-L de Jager
1^{r}

- (Sweden) J Björkman
- (Germany) D Prinosil
6
6

- (Sweden) J Björkman
- (Germany) D Prinosil
7^{7}
3
6^{1}

7
- (South Africa) D Adams
- (South Africa) J-L de Jager
6^{4}
6
7^{7}

- (Argentina) M García
- (Italy) D Nargiso
6
4
3

6
- (Netherlands) P Haarhuis
- (Canada) D Nestor
4
6
6

4
- (South Africa) W Ferreira
- (Russia) Y Kafelnikov
6
1
6^{3}

- (Argentina) P Albano
- (Brazil) J Oncins
6^{2}
2

- (Australia) W Arthurs
- (Socialist Federal Republic of Yugoslavia) N Zimonjić
3
6
7^{7}

- (Australia) W Arthurs
- (Socialist Federal Republic of Yugoslavia) N Zimonjić
7^{7}
6

- (Australia) W Arthurs
- (Socialist Federal Republic of Yugoslavia) N Zimonjić
3
6^{7}

- (South Africa) C Haggard
- (Argentina) D Orsanic
4
7^{7}
6

6
- (Netherlands) P Haarhuis
- (Canada) D Nestor
6
7^{9}

WC
- (France) A Clément
- (France) N Mahut
6
6^{5}
2

- (South Africa) C Haggard
- (Argentina) D Orsanic
0
3

6
- (Netherlands) P Haarhuis
- (Canada) D Nestor
6
6

=== Bottom half ===
First round

Second round

Quarterfinals

Semifinals

5
- (Sweden) N Kulti
- (Belarus) M Mirnyi
w/o

- (Australia) D Macpherson
- (South Africa) P Norval
2
7^{7}
4

WC
- (France) J Boutter
- (France) F Santoro

WC
- (France) J Boutter
- (France) F Santoro
6
6^{3}
6

5
- (Sweden) N Kulti
- (Belarus) M Mirnyi
6
6

- (Zimbabwe) B Black
- (Zimbabwe) K Ullyett
5
4

Q
- (Ecuador) N Lapentti
- (Spain) C Moyá
1
4

Q
- (Ecuador) N Lapentti
- (Spain) C Moyá
7
6

Q
- (Ecuador) N Lapentti
- (Spain) C Moyá
6
3
6

3
- (Czech Republic) J Novák
- (Czech Republic) D Rikl
3
6
3

5
- (Sweden) N Kulti
- (Belarus) M Mirnyi
5
7
6

2
- (United States) A O'Brien
- (United States) J Palmer
7
5
4

8
- (Switzerland) R Federer
- (Slovakia) D Hrbatý
6^{6}
5

- (Australia) M Hill
- (United States) J Tarango
6
6

- (Australia) M Hill
- (United States) J Tarango
7^{8}
7

WC
- (France) J Benneteau
- (France) P-H Mathieu
2
4

- (Australia) M Hill
- (United States) J Tarango
3
6
6^{2}

WC
- (France) N Escudé
- (France) M Llodra
7^{9}
6

2
- (United States) A O'Brien
- (United States) J Palmer
6
4
7^{7}

WC
- (France) A Di Pasquale
- (Russia) M Safin
6^{7}
2

WC
- (France) N Escudé
- (France) M Llodra
3
3

2
- (United States) A O'Brien
- (United States) J Palmer
6
6
