= 2000 Paris Masters – Singles =

Singles
- 2000 Paris Masters

Final
- Champion: (Russia) Marat Safin
- Runner-up: (Australia) Mark Philippoussis
- Score: 3–6, 7–6^{(9–7)}, 6–4, 3–6, 7–6^{(10–8)}

Details
- Draw: 48 (6 Q / 3 LL / 3 WC)
- Seeds: 16

Events
Singles	Doubles
← 1999 ·	Paris Masters	· 2001 →

Marat Safin defeated Mark Philippoussis in the final, 3–6, 7–6^{(9–7)}, 6–4, 3–6, 7–6^{(10–8)} to win the singles tennis title at the 2000 Paris Masters. With the win, Safin became the world No. 1 for the first time.

Andre Agassi was the reigning champion, but did not participate.

== Seeds ==
A champion seed is indicated in bold text while text in italics indicates the round in which that seed was eliminated. All sixteen seeds received a bye into the second round.

1. (Brazil) Gustavo Kuerten (semifinals)
2. (Russia) **Marat Safin (champion)**
3. (Sweden) Magnus Norman (second round)
4. (Russia) Yevgeny Kafelnikov (third round)
5. (Australia) ~~Lleyton Hewitt~~ (withdrew)
6. (United States) ~~Andre Agassi~~ (withdrew)
7. (Sweden) Thomas Enqvist (second round)
8. (Spain) Álex Corretja (quarterfinals)
9. (United Kingdom) Tim Henman (second round)
10. (South Africa) Wayne Ferreira (third round)
11. (Argentina) Franco Squillari (second round)
12. (Spain) Juan Carlos Ferrero (semifinals)
13. (Australia) Mark Philippoussis (final)
14. (France) Cédric Pioline (second round)
15. (Australia) Patrick Rafter (third round)
16. (France) Sébastien Grosjean (third round)

== Draw ==
=== Key ===
- Q = Qualifier
- WC = Wild card
- LL = Lucky loser
- Alt = Alternate
- ITF = ITF entry
- PR = Protected ranking
- SR = Special ranking
- SE = Special exempt
- JE = Junior exempt
- JR = Junior Accelerator Programme entrant
- CO = College Accelerator Programme entrant
- NG = Next Gen Accelerator Program entrant
- w/o = Walkover
- r = Retired
- d = Defaulted

=== Finals ===
Quarterfinals
1	**(Brazil) Gustavo Kuerten**	**6**	**7**
(Spain) Albert Costa	4	5
13	**(Australia) Mark Philippoussis**	4	**6**	**7^{7}**
Q	(Germany) David Prinosil	**6**	4	6^{3}
12	**(Spain) Juan Carlos Ferrero**	**6**	6^{10}	**7**
(France) Fabrice Santoro	4	**7^{12}**	5
8	(Spain) Àlex Corretja	6^{5}	3
2	**(Russia) Marat Safin**	**7^{7}**	**6**

Semifinals
1	(Brazil) Gustavo Kuerten	6^{5}	6^{11}
13	**(Australia) Mark Philippoussis**	**7^{7}**	**7^{13}**
12	(Spain) Juan Carlos Ferrero	2	2
2	**(Russia) Marat Safin**	**6**	**6**

Final
13	(Australia) Mark Philippoussis	**6**	6^{7}	4	**6**	6^{8}
2	**(Russia) Marat Safin**	3	**7^{9}**	**6**	3	**7^{10}**

=== Top half ===
==== Section 1 ====
First round
Q	(United States) **C Woodruff**	4	**7**	**6**
(Czech Republic) J Novák	**6**	5	3
WC	(France) **J Boutter**	**6**	6^{5}	**6**
(Zimbabwe) B Black	4	**7^{7}**	4
Q	(United States) A O'Brien	5	3
(Spain) **Á Costa**	**7**	**6**
(Slovakia) K Kučera	**6**	5	6^{6}
LL	(Italy) **G Pozzi**	4	**7**	**7^{8}**

Second round
1	(Brazil) **G Kuerten**	**6**	**7^{7}**
Q	(United States) C Woodruff	3	6^{0}
WC	(France) J Boutter	3	2
15	(Australia) **P Rafter**	**6**	**6**
9	(United Kingdom) T Henman	4	4
(Spain) **Á Costa**	**6**	**6**
LL	(Italy) **G Pozzi**	**6**	1	**7^{7}**
7	(Sweden) T Enqvist	2	**6**	6^{5}

Third round
1	(Brazil) **G Kuerten**	**6**	**7^{7}**
15	(Australia) P Rafter	4	6^{4}
(Spain) **Á Costa**	**6**	**6**
LL	(Italy) G Pozzi	2	4

Quarterfinals
1	(Brazil) **G Kuerten**	**6**	**7**
(Spain) Á Costa	4	5

==== Section 2 ====
First round
(France) J Golmard	2	1^{r}
Q	(Sweden) **M Gustafsson**	**6**	2
(Switzerland) R Federer	**6**	2	2
(Slovakia) **D Hrbatý**	4	**6**	**6**
Q	(Germany) **D Prinosil**	**6**	**6**
(Argentina) G Gaudio	2	1
(United States) **M Chang**	**6**	**7**
WC	(France) A Di Pasquale	2	5

Second round
4	(Russia) **Y Kafelnikov**	**7^{7}**	**6**
Q	(Sweden) M Gustafsson	6^{5}	4
(Slovakia) D Hrbatý	**6**	6^{1}	6^{1}
13	(Australia) **M Philippoussis**	1	**7^{7}**	**7^{7}**
11	(Argentina) F Squillari	3	3
Q	(Germany) **D Prinosil**	**6**	**6**
(United States) **M Chang**	6^{5}	**6**	**6**
LL	(Israel) H Levy	**7^{7}**	4	4

Third round
4	(Russia) Y Kafelnikov	4	2
13	(Australia) **M Philippoussis**	**6**	**6**
Q	(Germany) **D Prinosil**	4	**7^{8}**	**6**
(United States) M Chang	**6**	6^{6}	4

Quarterfinals
13	(Australia) **M Philippoussis**	4	**6**	**7^{7}**
Q	(Germany) D Prinosil	**6**	4	6^{3}

=== Bottom half ===
==== Section 3 ====
First round
(Romania) A Pavel	1^{r}
(United States) **J-M Gambill**	4
(Argentina) M Puerta	4^{r}
(Ecuador) **N Lapentti**	5
(Spain) F Vicente	4	**7^{7}**	3
(Switzerland) **M Rosset**	**6**	6^{3}	**6**
(France) **F Santoro**	6^{4}	**6**	**6**
(Spain) C Moyà	**7^{7}**	4	3

Second round
LL	(France) S Huet	3	5
(United States) **J-M Gambill**	**6**	**7**
(Ecuador) N Lapentti	5	**6**	3
12	(Spain) **J C Ferrero**	**7**	3	**6**
14	(France) C Pioline	5	5
(Switzerland) **M Rosset**	**7**	**7**
(France) **F Santoro**	**6**	**6**
3	(Sweden) M Norman	2	4

Third round
(United States) J-M Gambill	**6**	5	4
12	(Spain) **J C Ferrero**	4	**7**	**6**
(Switzerland) M Rosset	4	**6**	6^{3}
(France) **F Santoro**	**6**	3	**7^{7}**

Quarterfinals
12	(Spain) **J C Ferrero**	**6**	6^{10}	**7**
(France) F Santoro	4	**7^{12}**	5

==== Section 4 ====
First round
(France) **A Clément**	**7^{7}**	**7**
(United Kingdom) G Rusedski	6^{5}	5
(France) N Escudé	**6**	3	4
(Belarus) **M Mirnyi**	3	**6**	**6**
(Germany) **T Haas**	**7**	**6**
Q	(Belgium) C Rochus	5	4
WC	(France) M Llodra	4	6^{3}
Q	(Switzerland) **G Bastl**	**6**	**7^{7}**

Second round
8	(Spain) **Á Corretja**	**6**	6^{2}	**6**
(France) A Clément	2	**7^{7}**	3
(Belarus) M Mirnyi	4	**6**	4
10	(South Africa) **W Ferreira**	**6**	2	**6**
16	(France) **S Grosjean**	**7**	**6**
(Germany) T Haas	5	4
Q	(Switzerland) G Bastl	5	4
2	(Russia) **M Safin**	**7**	**6**

Third round
8	(Spain) **Á Corretja**	**6**	**6**
10	(South Africa) W Ferreira	3	4
16	(France) S Grosjean	2	6^{4}
2	(Russia) **M Safin**	**6**	**7^{7}**

Quarterfinals
8	(Spain) Á Corretja	6^{5}	3
2	(Russia) **M Safin**	**7^{7}**	**6**

== Qualifying ==
=== Qualifying seeds ===
1. (Germany) **David Prinosil (qualified)**
2. (Italy) Gianluca Pozzi (qualifying competition, **lucky loser**)
3. (Sweden) Thomas Johansson (first round)
4. (Israel) Harel Levy (qualifying competition, **lucky loser**)
5. (Sweden) **Magnus Gustafsson (qualified)**
6. (Belgium) Olivier Rochus (first round, withdrew)
7. (Chile) Nicolás Massú (first round, withdrew)
8. (Czech Republic) Jiří Vaněk (qualifying competition)
9. (Belgium) **Christophe Rochus (qualified)**
10. (Czech Republic) Bohdan Ulihrach (qualifying competition)
11. (United States) **Chris Woodruff (qualified)**
12. (Australia) Wayne Arthurs (first round)

=== Qualifiers ===
1. (Germany) **David Prinosil**
2. (United States) **Chris Woodruff**
3. (Switzerland) **George Bastl**
4. (Belgium) **Christophe Rochus**
5. (Sweden) **Magnus Gustafsson**
6. (United States) **Alex O'Brien**

=== Lucky losers ===
1. (Italy) **Gianluca Pozzi**
2. (Israel) **Harel Levy**
3. (France) **Stéphane Huet**

=== Qualifying draw ===
==== First qualifier ====
First round
1	**(Germany) David Prinosil**	5	**6**	**7**
(France) Cyril Saulnier	**7**	4	5
**(France) Stéphane Huet**	**6**	**7^{9}**
12	(Australia) Wayne Arthurs	4	6^{7}

Qualifying competition
1	**(Germany) David Prinosil**	**6**	**6**
(France) Stéphane Huet	1	2

==== Second qualifier ====
First round
2	**(Italy) Gianluca Pozzi**	**6**	**6**
WC	(France) Sébastien de Chaunac	3	1
(Armenia) Sargis Sargsian	2	**6**	1
11	**(United States) Chris Woodruff**	**6**	3	**6**

Qualifying competition
2	(Italy) Gianluca Pozzi	**6**	3	2
11	**(United States) Chris Woodruff**	2	**6**	**6**

==== Third qualifier ====
First round
3	(Sweden) Thomas Johansson	**6**	3	6^{3}
**(Switzerland) George Bastl**	3	**6**	**7^{7}**
WC	(France) Nicolas Mahut	6^{6}	3
10	**(Czech Republic) Bohdan Ulihrach**	**7^{8}**	**6**

Qualifying competition
**(Switzerland) George Bastl**	**6**	**6**
10	(Czech Republic) Bohdan Ulihrach	4	2

==== Fourth qualifier ====
First round
4	**(Israel) Harel Levy**	**7^{7}**	**6**
(Federal Republic of Yugoslavia) Nenad Zimonjić	6^{5}	3
(France) Jean-François Bachelot	3	4
9	**(Belgium) Christophe Rochus**	**6**	**6**

Qualifying competition
4	(Israel) Harel Levy	6^{5}	1
9	**(Belgium) Christophe Rochus**	**7^{7}**	**6**

==== Fifth qualifier ====
First round
5	**(Sweden) Magnus Gustafsson**	**6**	3
(Croatia) Goran Ivanišević	1	0^{r}
WC	(France) Julien Benneteau	**7^{8}**	2	6^{7}
8	**(Czech Republic) Jiří Vaněk**	6^{6}	**6**	**7^{9}**

Qualifying competition
5	**(Sweden) Magnus Gustafsson**	**6**	**6**
8	(Czech Republic) Jiří Vaněk	2	3

==== Sixth qualifier ====
First round
6	(Belgium) Olivier Rochus
**(United States) Alex O'Brien**	w/o
WC	**(France) Paul-Henri Mathieu**	w/o
7	(Chile) Nicolás Massú

Qualifying competition
**(United States) Alex O'Brien**	**7^{7}**	**6**
WC	(France) Paul-Henri Mathieu	6^{2}	3
