= 2001 President's Cup – Singles =

Singles
- 2001 President's Cup
- 2000 Champion: (Russia) Marat Safin

Final
- Champion: (Russia) Marat Safin
- Runner-up: (Russia) Yevgeny Kafelnikov
- Score: 6–2, 6–2

Events
Singles	Doubles
- ATP Tashkent Open

Marat Safin was the defending champion and won in the final 6–2, 6–2 against Yevgeny Kafelnikov.

== Seeds ==
A champion seed is indicated in bold text while text in italics indicates the round in which that seed was eliminated.

1. (Russia) **Marat Safin (champion)**
2. (Russia) Yevgeny Kafelnikov (final)
3. (Slovakia) Dominik Hrbatý (semifinals)
4. (Netherlands) Sjeng Schalken (quarterfinals)
5. (Germany) Nicolas Kiefer (first round)
6. (Belgium) Xavier Malisse (first round)
7. (Italy) Davide Sanguinetti (first round)
8. (France) Julien Boutter (first round)

== Draw ==
Key

- Q = Qualifier
- WC = Wild card
- LL = Lucky loser
- Alt = Alternate
- ITF = ITF entry
- PR = Protected ranking
- SR = Special ranking
- SE = Special exempt
- JE = Junior exempt
- JR = Junior Accelerator Programme entrant
- CO = College Accelerator Programme entrant
- NG = Next Gen Accelerator Program entrant
- w/o = Walkover
- r = Retired
- d = Defaulted

=== Finals ===
First round
1	(Russia) **M Safin**	**6**	**6**
Q	(Israel) N Okun	4	2
Q	(Croatia) I Karlović	6^{3}	3
(Switzerland) **M Rosset**	**7^{7}**	**6**
(Denmark) **K Pless**	3	**6**	**6**
Q	(Finland) T Ketola	**6**	3	1
WC	(Uzbekistan) **O Ogorodov**	**7^{7}**	**7^{7}**
7	(Italy) D Sanguinetti	6^{3}	6^{4}
4	(Netherlands) **S Schalken**	**6**	**6**
(United States) M Russell	4	2
(Russia) M Youzhny	5	**7**	3
(France) **A Dupuis**	**7**	5	**6**
(Israel) H Levy	5	1
(Italy) **G Pozzi**	**7**	**6**
(Armenia) **S Sargsian**	**6**	**6**
8	(France) J Boutter	4	4
6	(Belgium) X Malisse	**6**	3	6^{6}
(Thailand) **P Srichaphan**	2	**6**	**7^{8}**
(United States) **T Dent**	**7^{10}**	**7**
(Netherlands) J Siemerink	6^{8}	5
(Switzerland) M Kratochvil	2	3
Q	(Slovakia) **J Krošlák**	**6**	**6**
WC	(Uzbekistan) D Tomashevich	6^{5}	4
3	(Slovakia) **D Hrbatý**	**7^{7}**	**6**
5	(Germany) N Kiefer	5	4
(Czech Republic) **D Vacek**	**7**	**6**
(Germany) **R Schüttler**	**6**	**6**
(Russia) A Stoliarov	2	3
WC	(Uzbekistan) V Kutsenko	4	2
(Austria) **S Koubek**	**6**	**6**
(Germany) L Burgsmüller	4	6^{2}
2	(Russia) **Y Kafelnikov**	**6**	**7^{7}**

Second round
1	(Russia) **M Safin**	**6**	**7^{7}**
(Switzerland) M Rosset	4	6^{3}
(Denmark) **K Pless**	**6**	**6**
WC	(Uzbekistan) O Ogorodov	3	2
4	(Netherlands) **S Schalken**	**6**	**6**
(France) A Dupuis	4	0
(Italy) G Pozzi	2	5
(Armenia) **S Sargsian**	**6**	**7**
(Thailand) **P Srichaphan**	**6**	**6**
(United States) T Dent	4	2
Q	(Slovakia) J Krošlák	5	1
3	(Slovakia) **D Hrbatý**	**7**	**6**
(Czech Republic) D Vacek	4	1
(Germany) **R Schüttler**	**6**	**6**
(Austria) S Koubek	**6**	4	3
2	(Russia) **Y Kafelnikov**	4	**6**	**6**

Quarterfinals
1	(Russia) **M Safin**	3	**6**	**6**
(Denmark) K Pless	**6**	1	2
4	(Netherlands) S Schalken	6^{2}	**6**	4
(Armenia) **S Sargsian**	**7^{7}**	2	**6**
(Thailand) P Srichaphan	6^{3}	2
3	(Slovakia) **D Hrbatý**	**7^{7}**	**6**
(Germany) R Schüttler	6^{7}	3
2	(Russia) **Y Kafelnikov**	**7^{9}**	**6**

Semifinals
1	(Russia) **M Safin**	6^{3}	**6**	**7^{7}**
(Armenia) S Sargsian	**7^{7}**	3	6^{5}
3	(Slovakia) D Hrbatý	**7^{8}**	2	6^{8}
2	(Russia) **Y Kafelnikov**	6^{6}	**6**	**7^{10}**

Final
1	(Russia) **Marat Safin**	**6**	**6**
2	(Russia) Yevgeny Kafelnikov	2	2
