= 2000 President's Cup – Singles =

Singles
- 2000 President's Cup

Final
- Champion: (Russia) Marat Safin
- Runner-up: (Italy) Davide Sanguinetti
- Score: 6–3, 6–4

Details
- Draw: 32
- Seeds: 8

Events
Singles	Doubles
- ATP Tashkent Open

The 2000 President's Cup was a men's tennis tournament played on hardcourt in Tashkent, Uzbekistan that was part of the International Series of the 2000 ATP Tour. It was the fourth edition of the tournament and was held from 11 September – 17 September.

== Seeds ==
Champion seeds are indicated in bold text while text in italics indicates the round in which those seeds were eliminated.

1. (Russia) Yevgeny Kafelnikov (second round)
2. (Russia) **Marat Safin (champion)**
3. (France) Cédric Pioline (first round)
4. (Morocco) Younes El Aynaoui (first round)
5. (United Kingdom) Greg Rusedski (second round)
6. (France) Jérôme Golmard (quarterfinals)
7. (Spain) Carlos Moyá (first round)
8. (Israel) Harel Levy (second round)

== Draw ==
Key

- Q = Qualifier
- WC = Wild card
- LL = Lucky loser
- Alt = Alternate
- ITF = ITF entry
- PR = Protected ranking
- SR = Special ranking
- SE = Special exempt
- JE = Junior exempt
- JR = Junior Accelerator Programme entrant
- CO = College Accelerator Programme entrant
- NG = Next Gen Accelerator Program entrant
- w/o = Walkover
- r = Retired
- d = Defaulted

=== Finals ===
Semifinals
**(Italy) Davide Sanguinetti**	**7**	**7**
(France) Julien Boutter	6^{5}	6^{4}
(Switzerland) George Bastl	2	2
2	**(Russia) Marat Safin**	**6**	**6**

Final
(Italy) Davide Sanguinetti	3	4
2	**(Russia) Marat Safin**	**6**	**6**

=== Top half ===
First round
1	**(Russia) Y Kafelnikov**	**6**	**6**
(Croatia) L Zovko	4	4
**(Italy) D Sanguinetti**	**6**	**6**
(Thailand) P Srichaphan	2	0
**(United States) J Gimelstob**	**6**	**6**
(Netherlands) J Siemerink	4	3
8	**(Israel) H Levy**	**6**	**6**
(Italy) L Tieleman	1	1
**(France) J Boutter**	3	**7**	**6**
4	(Morocco) Y El Aynaoui	**6**	6^{5}	4
**(Israel) J Erlich**	**7**	**6**
(Uzbekistan) V Kutsenko	6^{3}	4
**(Russia) M Youzhny**	3	**6**	**7**
(Netherlands) J van Lottum	**6**	3	5
6	**(France) J Golmard**	**7**	**6**
(Croatia) I Ljubičić	6^{4}	1

Second round
1	(Russia) Y Kafelnikov	5	3
**(Italy) D Sanguinetti**	**7**	**6**
**(United States) J Gimelstob**	**6**	**6**
8	(Israel) H Levy	4	3
**(France) J Boutter**	**6**	**6**
(Israel) J Erlich	4	4
(Russia) M Youzhny	4	0
6	**(France) J Golmard**	**6**	**6**

Quarterfinals
**(Italy) D Sanguinetti**	**6**	5	**6**
(United States) J Gimelstob	0	**7**	3
**(France) J Boutter**	**6**	1
6	(France) J Golmard	1	1^{r}

Semifinals
**(Italy) D Sanguinetti**	**7**	**7**
(France) J Boutter	6^{5}	6^{4}

=== Bottom half ===
First round
5	**(United Kingdom) G Rusedski**	**6**	**7**
(Armenia) S Sargsian	3	5
**(Russia) A Stoliarov**	**6**	**6**
(United States) P Goldstein	2	2
**(France) A Dupuis**	**6**	**6**
(Sweden) F Jonsson	4	2
**(Switzerland) G Bastl**	**6**	**6**
3	(France) C Pioline	1	3
**(France) S Huet**	**7**	**7**
7	(Spain) C Moyá	6^{8}	5
**(United Kingdom) J Delgado**	**6**	5	**7**
(Brazil) A Sá	1	**7**	5
**(Switzerland) M Kratochvil**	**6**	**6**
(Germany) T Behrend	3	2
2	**(Russia) M Safin**	**6**	**6**
(Uzbekistan) O Ogorodov	4	4

Second round
5	(United Kingdom) G Rusedski	**7**	3	5
**(Russia) A Stoliarov**	6^{6}	**6**	**7**
(France) A Dupuis	**6**	3	4
**(Switzerland) G Bastl**	3	**6**	**6**
(France) S Huet	1	0^{r}
**(United Kingdom) J Delgado**	**6**	2
(Switzerland) M Kratochvil	**6**	1	3
2	**(Russia) M Safin**	4	**6**	**6**

Quarterfinals
(Russia) A Stoliarov	4	**6**	3
**(Switzerland) G Bastl**	**6**	3	**6**
(United Kingdom) J Delgado	4	4
2	**(Russia) M Safin**	**6**	**6**

Semifinals
(Switzerland) G Bastl	2	2
2	**(Russia) M Safin**	**6**	**6**
