= 2000 Paris Masters =

- Date: 13–20 November
- Edition: 28th
- Category: ATP Masters Series
- Draw: 48S / 24D
- Prize money: $2,450,000
- Surface: Carpet / indoor
- Location: Paris, France
- Venue: Palais omnisports de Paris-Bercy

Champions

Singles
- (Russia) Marat Safin

Doubles
- (Sweden) Nicklas Kulti / (Belarus) Max Mirnyi
← 1999 ·	Paris Masters	· 2001 →

The 2000 Paris Masters was a men's tennis tournament played on indoor carpet courts. It was the 28th edition of the Paris Masters, and was part of the ATP Masters Series of the 2000 ATP Tour. It took place at the Palais omnisports de Paris-Bercy in Paris, France, from 13 November through 20 November 2000. Second-seeded Marat Safin won the singles title.

== Finals ==
=== Singles ===
(Russia) Marat Safin defeated (Australia) Mark Philippoussis 3–6, 7–6^{(9–7)}, 6–4, 3–6, 7–6^{(10–8)}

- It was Safin's 7th singles title of the year and the 8th of his career. It was his 2nd Masters Series title of the year, and overall.

=== Doubles ===
(Sweden) Nicklas Kulti / (Belarus) Max Mirnyi defeated (Netherlands) Paul Haarhuis / (Canada) Daniel Nestor 6–4, 7–5
