= 2001 Paris Masters =

- Date: 29 October – 5 November
- Edition: 29th
- Category: Tennis Masters Series
- Draw: 48S / 24D
- Prize money: $2,450,000
- Surface: Carpet / indoor
- Location: Paris, France
- Venue: Palais Omnisports de Paris-Bercy

Champions

Singles
- (France) Sébastien Grosjean

Doubles
- (South Africa) Ellis Ferreira / (United States) Rick Leach
← 2000 ·	Paris Masters	· 2002 →

The 2001 Paris Masters was a men's tennis tournament played on indoor carpet courts. It was the 29th edition of the Paris Masters and was part of the Tennis Masters Series of the 2001 ATP Tour. It took place at the Palais Omnisports de Paris-Bercy in Paris, France from 29 October through 5 November 2001.

The singles draw was headlined by ATP No. 1, Buenos Aires, Acapulco, Monte Carlo, French Open, Stuttgart, Cincinnati champion, Rome and Indianapolis finalist Gustavo Kuerten, Sydney, Queen's, 's-Hertogenbosch, US Open, Tokyo champion Lleyton Hewitt and Dubai, Estoril, Barcelona and Rome champion Juan Carlos Ferrero. Other top seeds were Marseille, Moscow, Tashkent, St. Petersburg winner and defending champion Yevgeny Kafelnikov, Marat Safin, Sébastien Grosjean, Tommy Haas and Tim Henman.

== Finals ==
=== Singles ===
(France) Sébastien Grosjean defeated (Russia) Yevgeny Kafelnikov 7–6^{(7–3)}, 6–1, 6–7^{(5–7)}, 6–4

- It was Grosjean's only title of the year and the 3rd of his career. It was also his 1st and only Masters Series title.

=== Doubles ===
(South Africa) Ellis Ferreira / (United States) Rick Leach defeated (India) Mahesh Bhupathi / (India) Leander Paes 3–6, 6–4, 6–3

- It was Ferreira's 2nd title of the year and the 17th of his career. It was Leach's 3rd title of the year and the 43rd of his career.
