= 2002 BNP Paribas Masters – Singles =

Singles
- 2002 BNP Paribas Masters

Final
- Champion: (Russia) Marat Safin
- Runner-up: (Australia) Lleyton Hewitt
- Score: 7–6^{(7–4)}, 6–0, 6–4

Details
- Draw: 48 (5 Q / 2 WC / 3 LL )
- Seeds: 16

Events
Singles	Doubles
- Paris Masters

Marat Safin defeated Lleyton Hewitt in the final, 7–6^{(7–4)}, 6–0, 6–4 to win the singles tennis title at the 2002 Paris Masters. It was his second Paris Masters title.

Sébastien Grosjean was the defending champion, but lost in the third round to Carlos Moyá.

== Seeds ==
A champion seed is indicated in bold text while text in italics indicates the round in which that seed was eliminated. All sixteen seeds received a bye into the second round.

1. (Australia) Lleyton Hewitt (final)
2. (United States) Andre Agassi (quarterfinals)
3. (Russia) **Marat Safin (champion)**
4. (Spain) Juan Carlos Ferrero (second round)
5. (Czech Republic) Jiří Novák (second round)
6. (United Kingdom) Tim Henman (third round)
7. (France) Sébastien Grosjean (third round)
8. (Switzerland) Roger Federer (quarterfinals)
9. (Germany) Tommy Haas (third round)
10. (Spain) Carlos Moyá (semifinals)
11. (Spain) Albert Costa (second round)
12. (United States) Andy Roddick (quarterfinals)
13. (Sweden) Thomas Johansson (third round)
14. (Russia) Yevgeny Kafelnikov (third round)
15. (Netherlands) Sjeng Schalken (third round)
16. (Argentina) Guillermo Cañas (third round)

== Draw ==
Key

- Q = Qualifier
- WC = Wild card
- LL = Lucky loser
- Alt = Alternate
- ITF = ITF entry
- PR = Protected ranking
- SR = Special ranking
- SE = Special exempt
- JE = Junior exempt
- JR = Junior Accelerator Programme entrant
- CO = College Accelerator Programme entrant
- NG = Next Gen Accelerator Program entrant
- w/o = Walkover
- r = Retired
- d = Defaulted

=== Finals ===
Quarterfinals
1	**(Australia) Lleyton Hewitt**	**6**	**6**
8	(Switzerland) Roger Federer	4	4
**(Thailand) Paradorn Srichaphan**	**7^{7}**	**7^{7}**
12	(United States) Andy Roddick	6^{3}	6^{3}
WC	(France) Nicolas Escudé	3	**7**	3
3	**(Russia) Marat Safin**	**6**	5	**6**
10	**(Spain) Carlos Moyá**	**6**	**6**
2	(United States) Andre Agassi	4	4

Semifinals
1	(Australia) **Lleyton Hewitt**	**6**	3	**6**
(Thailand) Paradorn Srichaphan	3	**6**	3
3	(Russia) **Marat Safin**	**7**	**7^{7}**
10	(Spain) Carlos Moyà	5	6^{4}

Final
1	(Australia) Lleyton Hewitt	6^{4}	0	4
3	(Russia) **Marat Safin**	**7^{7}**	**6**	**6**

=== Top half ===
==== Section 1 ====
First round
LL	(Argentina) M Zabaleta	1	**6**	3
(Finland) **J Nieminen**	**6**	1	**6**
Q	(France) A Dupuis	**7**	3	3
(Ecuador) **N Lapentti**	5	**6**	**6**
Q	(Slovakia) **D Hrbatý**	3	**6**	**6**
(Switzerland) M Kratochvil	**6**	2	2
(Belgium) **X Malisse**	5	**6**	**6**
(Austria) S Koubek	**7**	2	0

Second round
1	(Australia) **L Hewitt**	**6**	**6**
(Finland) J Nieminen	2	4
(Ecuador) N Lapentti	3	6^{8}
14	(Russia) **Y Kafelnikov**	**6**	**7^{10}**
9	(Germany) **T Haas**	6^{7}	**6**	**6**
Q	(Slovakia) D Hrbatý	**7^{9}**	4	4
(Belgium) X Malisse	2	4
8	(Switzerland) **R Federer**	**6**	**6**

Third round
1	(Australia) **L Hewitt**	**6**	**7^{7}**
14	(Russia) Y Kafelnikov	2	6^{3}
9	(Germany) T Haas	2	6^{2}
8	(Switzerland) **R Federer**	**6**	**7^{7}**

Quarterfinals
1	(Australia) **L Hewitt**	**6**	**6**
8	(Switzerland) R Federer	4	4

==== Section 2 ====
First round
(Thailand) **P Srichaphan**	**6**	1
(United States) J-M Gambill	2	0^{r}
LL	(Belgium) **O Rochus**	**7**	1
(Chile) M Ríos	5	0^{r}
(Croatia) **I Ljubičić**	**6**	**6**
(Argentina) J I Chela	3	3
Q	(Argentina) G Coria	2	**7^{11}**	2
(Romania) **A Pavel**	**6**	6^{9}	**6**

Second round
4	(Spain) J C Ferrero	2	3
(Thailand) **P Srichaphan**	**6**	**6**
LL	(Belgium) O Rochus	3	**6**	6^{2}
16	(Argentina) **G Cañas**	**6**	2	**7^{7}**
12	(United States) **A Roddick**	**7^{7}**	**7^{7}**
(Croatia) I Ljubičić	6^{4}	6^{3}
(Romania) **A Pavel**	**6**	**6**
5	(Czech Republic) J Novák	1	3

Third round
(Thailand) **P Srichaphan**	**6**	**6**
16	(Argentina) G Cañas	1	4
12	(United States) **A Roddick**	**7^{7}**	**6**
(Romania) A Pavel	6^{5}	4

Quarterfinals
(Thailand) **P Srichaphan**	**7^{7}**	**7^{7}**
12	(United States) A Roddick	6^{3}	6^{3}

=== Bottom half ===
==== Section 3 ====
First round
Q	(Czech Republic) **R Štěpánek**	4	**6**	**7^{7}**
(Brazil) G Kuerten	**6**	3	6^{3}
(Spain) F Mantilla	2	1
WC	(France) **N Escudé**	**6**	**6**
(France) **A Clément**	**7**	**6**
(Germany) R Schüttler	5	3
(Argentina) **D Nalbandian**	6^{2}	**6**	**7**
(Belarus) M Mirnyi	**7^{7}**	3	5

Second round
6	(United Kingdom) **T Henman**	**6**	**7**
Q	(Czech Republic) R Štěpánek	1	5
WC	(France) **N Escudé**	**6**	3	**6**
11	(Spain) A Costa	1	**6**	3
15	(Netherlands) **S Schalken**	4	**6**	**6**
(France) A Clément	**6**	2	4
(Argentina) D Nalbandian	3	2
3	(Russia) **M Safin**	**6**	**6**

Third round
6	(United Kingdom) T Henman	4	2
WC	(France) **N Escudé**	**6**	**6**
15	(Netherlands) S Schalken	5	5
3	(Russia) **M Safin**	**7**	**7**

Quarterfinals
WC	(France) N Escudé	3	**7**	3
3	(Russia) **M Safin**	**6**	5	**6**

==== Section 4 ====
First round
(Morocco) Y El Aynaoui	4	6^{3}
Q	(Denmark) **K Carlsen**	**6**	**7^{7}**
(Chile) F González	**7^{7}**	4	4
(United States) **J Blake**	6^{4}	**6**	**6**
WC	(France) F Santoro	4	2
(Spain) **T Robredo**	**6**	**6**
LL	(Italy) D Sanguinetti	4	6^{1}
(Argentina) **G Gaudio**	**6**	**7^{7}**

Second round
7	(France) **S Grosjean**	**7^{7}**	**7**
Q	(Denmark) K Carlsen	6^{2}	5
(United States) J Blake	3	3
10	(Spain) **C Moyá**	**6**	**6**
13	(Sweden) **T Johansson**	**7^{7}**	**6**
(Spain) T Robredo	6^{1}	3
(Argentina) G Gaudio	4	**7^{7}**	4
2	(United States) **A Agassi**	**6**	6^{1}	**6**

Third round
7	(France) S Grosjean	**6**	6^{10}	1
10	(Spain) **C Moyá**	3	**7^{12}**	**6**
13	(Sweden) T Johansson	**7^{7}**	4	3
2	(United States) **A Agassi**	6^{2}	**6**	**6**

Quarterfinals
10	(Spain) **C Moyá**	**6**	**6**
2	(United States) A Agassi	4	4

== Qualifying ==
=== Qualifying seeds ===
1. (Argentina) José Acasuso (first round)
2. (Italy) Davide Sanguinetti (qualifying competition, **lucky loser**)
3. (Sweden) Jonas Björkman (first round)
4. (Argentina) **Guillermo Coria (qualified)**
5. (United States) **Todd Martin** (qualified, later withdrew)
6. (Argentina) Mariano Zabaleta (qualifying competition, **lucky loser**)
7. (France) Julien Boutter (first round)
8. (United States) Vince Spadea (first round)
9. (United States) Taylor Dent (first round)
10. (Slovakia) **Dominik Hrbatý (qualified)**
11. (Belgium) Olivier Rochus (qualifying competition, **lucky loser**)
12. (Spain) Feliciano López (qualifying competition)

=== Qualifiers ===
1. (Denmark) **Kenneth Carlsen**
2. (France) **Antony Dupuis**
3. (Czech Republic) **Radek Štěpánek**
4. (Argentina) **Guillermo Coria**
5. (United States) ~~Todd Martin~~ (withdrew due to a back injury, replaced by Rochus)
6. (Slovakia) **Dominik Hrbatý**

=== Lucky losers ===
1. (Italy) **Davide Sanguinetti**
2. (Argentina) **Mariano Zabaleta**
3. (Belgium) **Olivier Rochus**

=== Qualifying draw ===
==== First qualifier ====
First round
1	(Argentina) José Acasuso	**7^{9}**	6^{6}	2
**(Denmark) Kenneth Carlsen**	6^{7}	**7^{8}**	**6**
**(Romania) Adrian Voinea**	**7^{9}**	**7**
7	(France) Julien Boutter	6^{7}	5

Qualifying competition
**(Denmark) Kenneth Carlsen**	**7**	**6**
(Romania) Adrian Voinea	5	2

==== Second qualifier ====
First round
2	**(Italy) Davide Sanguinetti**	4	**6**	**7^{7}**
WC	(France) Jean-René Lisnard	**6**	3	6^{3}
**(France) Antony Dupuis**	**6**	**7^{7}**
9	(United States) Taylor Dent	2	6^{4}

Qualifying competition
2	(Italy) Davide Sanguinetti	3	4
**(France) Antony Dupuis**	**6**	**6**

==== Third qualifier ====
First round
3	(Sweden) Jonas Björkman	4	**6**	6^{2}
**(Czech Republic) Radek Štěpánek**	**6**	3	**7^{7}**
(Czech Republic) Bohdan Ulihrach	3	4
12	**(Spain) Feliciano López**	**6**	**6**

Qualifying competition
**(Czech Republic) Radek Štěpánek**	6^{1}	**6**	**6**
12	(Spain) Feliciano López	**7^{7}**	4	4

==== Fourth qualifier ====
First round
4	**(Argentina) Guillermo Coria**	3	**6**	**7^{7}**
(Armenia) Sargis Sargsian	**6**	4	6^{2}
(France) Michaël Llodra	4	2
11	**(Belgium) Olivier Rochus**	**6**	**6**

Qualifying competition
4	**(Argentina) Guillermo Coria**	**7**	**6**
11	(Belgium) Olivier Rochus	5	4

==== Fifth qualifier ====
First round
5	**(United States) Todd Martin**	**7**	**6**
(France) Arnaud Di Pasquale	5	2
WC	**(France) Jean-François Bachelot**	1	**6**	**7^{7}**
8	(United States) Vince Spadea	**6**	2	6^{1}

Qualifying competition
5	**(United States) Todd Martin**	5	**6**	**6**
WC	(France) Jean-François Bachelot	**7**	4	1

==== Sixth qualifier ====
First round
6	**(Argentina) Mariano Zabaleta**	**7^{7}**	**7^{7}**
WC	(France) Grégory Carraz	6^{5}	6^{5}
WC	(France) Richard Gasquet	4	**7**	2
10	**(Slovakia) Dominik Hrbatý**	**6**	5	**6**

Qualifying competition
6	(Argentina) Mariano Zabaleta	6^{5}	**7**	1
10	**(Slovakia) Dominik Hrbatý**	**7^{7}**	5	**6**
