= 2001 President's Cup (tennis) =

- Date: 10–16 September
- Edition: 5th
- Category: International Series
- Draw: 32S / 16D
- Prize money: $525,000
- Surface: Hard / outdoor
- Location: Tashkent, Uzbekistan

Champions

Singles
- (Russia) Marat Safin

Doubles
- (France) Julien Boutter / (Slovakia) Dominik Hrbatý
- ATP Tashkent Open

The 2001 President's Cup was a men's tennis tournament played on outdoor hardcourts in Tashkent in Uzbekistan and was part of the International Series of the 2001 ATP Tour. The tournament ran from 10 September through 16 September 2001. First-seeded Marat Safin won the singles title.

== Finals ==
=== Singles ===
(Russia) Marat Safin defeated (Russia) Yevgeny Kafelnikov, 6–2, 6–2.

- It was Safin's 2nd title of the year and the 10th of his career.

=== Doubles ===
(France) Julien Boutter / (Slovakia) Dominik Hrbatý defeated (South Africa) Marius Barnard / (United States) Jim Thomas, 6–4, 3–6, [13–11].

- It was Boutter's 2nd title of the year and the 4th of his career. It was Hrbatý's 2nd title of the year and the 5th of his career.

== See also ==
- 2001 Tashkent Open
