= Nicolas Escudé =

French tennis player (born 1976)

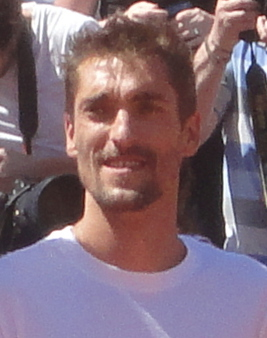
- Country (sports): France
- Residence: Geneva, Switzerland
- Born: 3 April 1976 (age 50) Chartres, France
- Height: 1.85 m (6 ft 1 in)
- Turned pro: 1995
- Retired: 18 May 2006
- Plays: Right-handed (two-handed backhand)
- Prize money: $3,216,150

Singles
- Career record: 172–129
- Career titles: 4
- Highest ranking: No. 17 (26 June 2000)

Grand Slam singles results
- Australian Open: SF (1998)
- French Open: 4R (2004)
- Wimbledon: QF (2001)
- US Open: QF (1999)

Other tournaments
- Grand Slam Cup: 1R (1998)

Doubles
- Career record: 57–49
- Career titles: 2
- Highest ranking: No. 35 (6 January 2003)

Grand Slam doubles results
- Australian Open: 1R (2001)
- French Open: SF (2001)
- Wimbledon: 1R (2001)
- US Open: 2R (2001)

Nicolas Jean-Christophe Escudé (French: [nikɔla ɛskyde]; born 3 April 1976) is a former professional tennis player from France, who turned professional in 1995. He won four singles titles and two doubles titles during his career.

Escudé is best remembered for the vital role he played in the 2001 Davis Cup final against Australia on the grass-courts of Melbourne. Escudé beat the recently crowned World No. 1, Lleyton Hewitt in the first rubber with a win in five sets, repeating what he did to Hewitt earlier that year in the fourth round of Wimbledon. Two days later, Escudé won the decisive fifth rubber for France against Wayne Arthurs in four sets.

The right-hander reached his highest individual ranking on the ATP Tour on 26 June 2000, when he became World No. 17. He's a natural left-hander who was trained since a child to play right-handed but does everything else lefty. His brother Julien Escudé is a professional football player.

Escudé teamed up with Roger Federer in the men's doubles at the French Open in 2000. However they were knocked out by Sébastien Lareau and Daniel Nestor.

In 2006, he announced his immediate retirement from the sport due to a persistent shoulder injury that had been keeping him out of the professional tennis circuit for the past 22 months.

Escudé was the captain of the France Fed Cup team from 2009 to 2012. He was also the co-coach of Nicolas Mahut for the 2013 season with Thierry Ascione and from 2013 to 2015 of Jo-Wilfried Tsonga.

He is currently the technical director of the French tennis federation.

== Career finals ==
=== Singles: 6 (4 wins / 2 losses) ===
Legend
Grand Slam (0)
Tennis Masters Cup (0)
ATP Masters Series (0)
ATP International Series Gold (2)
ATP Tour (2)

Result	W/L	Date	Tournament	Surface	Opponent	Score
Win	1–0	Sep 1999	Toulouse, France	Hard (i)	(Czech Republic) Daniel Vacek	7–5, 6–1
Loss	1–1	Jun 2000	's-Hertogenbosch, Netherlands	Grass	(Australia) Patrick Rafter	1–6, 3–6
Win	2–1	Feb 2001	Rotterdam, Netherlands	Hard (i)	(Switzerland) Roger Federer	7–5, 3–6, 7–6^{(7–5)}
Loss	2–2	Feb 2002	Marseille, France	Hard (i)	(Sweden) Thomas Enqvist	7–6^{(7–4)}, 3–6, 1–6
Win	3–2	Feb 2002	Rotterdam, Netherlands	Hard (i)	(United Kingdom) Tim Henman	3–6, 7–6^{(9–7)}, 6–4
Win	4–2	Jan 2004	Doha, Qatar	Hard	(Croatia) Ivan Ljubičić	6–3, 7–6^{(7–4)}

=== Doubles (2 wins) ===
Legend
Grand Slam (0)
Tennis Masters Cup (0)
ATP Masters Series (1)
ATP Tour (1)

Result	W/L	Date	Tournament	Surface	Partner	Opponents	Score
Win	1–0	Feb 2002	Marseille, France	Hard (i)	(France) Arnaud Clément	(France) Julien Boutter (Belarus) Max Mirnyi	6–4, 6–3
Win	2–0	Oct 2002	Paris, France	Hard (i)	(France) Fabrice Santoro	(Brazil) Gustavo Kuerten (France) Cédric Pioline	6–3, 7–6^{(8–6)}

== Singles performance timeline ==
Key
W	F	SF	QF	#R	RR	Q#	DNQ	A	NH

(W) winner; (F) finalist; (SF) semifinalist; (QF) quarterfinalist; (#R) rounds 4, 3, 2, 1; (RR) round-robin stage; (Q#) qualification round; (DNQ) did not qualify; (A) absent; (NH) not held; (SR) strike rate (events won / competed); (W–L) win–loss record.

Tournament	1993	1994	1995	1996	1997	1998	1999	2000	2001	2002	2003	2004	SR	W–L
Grand Slam tournaments
Australian Open	Q1	Q2	A	A	A	SF	A	4R	2R	3R	3R	3R	0 / 6	15–6
French Open	1R	Q1	Q1	A	3R	2R	2R	1R	1R	1R	1R	4R	0 / 9	7–9
Wimbledon	A	A	A	A	Q2	2R	A	2R	QF	3R	2R	A	0 / 5	9–5
US Open	A	A	A	A	2R	1R	QF	A	2R	A	A	A	0 / 4	6–4
Win–loss	0–1	0–0	0–0	0–0	3–2	7–4	5–2	4–3	6–4	4–3	3–3	5–2	0 / 24	37–24
Year-end championships
Grand Slam Cup	A	A	A	A	A	1R	A	Not Held					0 / 1	0–1
ATP Masters Series
Indian Wells	A	A	A	A	A	A	1R	3R	QF	2R	A	4R	0 / 5	9–5
Miami	A	A	A	A	A	2R	2R	3R	2R	3R	4R	1R	0 / 7	7–7
Monte Carlo	A	A	A	A	A	A	A	2R	1R	1R	1R	2R	0 / 5	2–5
Hamburg	A	A	A	A	A	2R	A	1R	3R	1R	A	A	0 / 4	3–4
Rome	A	A	A	A	A	2R	Q1	1R	1R	A	A	A	0 / 3	1–3
Canada	A	A	A	A	A	1R	A	3R	3R	A	A	1R	0 / 4	4–4
Cincinnati	A	A	A	A	A	1R	A	A	2R	A	A	A	0 / 2	1–2
Madrid	A	A	A	A	A	A	A	2R	1R	Q1	A	A	0 / 2	1–2
Paris	A	A	A	A	3R	2R	1R	1R	1R	QF	A	A	0 / 6	6–6
Win–loss	0–0	0–0	0–0	0–0	2–1	4–6	1–3	7–8	8–9	5–5	3–2	4–4	0 / 38	34–38
Career statistics
Titles	0	0	0	0	0	0	1	0	1	1	0	1	4	
Finals	0	0	0	0	0	0	1	1	1	2	0	1	6	
Year-end ranking	670	646	189	413	93	37	37	48	27	34	114	64		

== Top 10 wins ==
Season	1995	1996	1997	1998	1999	2000	2001	2002	2003	2004	Total
Wins	0	0	0	1	3	3	6	5	2	0	20

#	Player	Rank	Event	Surface	Rd	Score	ER
1998
1.	(Spain) Àlex Corretja	9	Halle, Germany	Grass	1R	6–2, 7–5	34
1999
2.	(Spain) Carlos Moyá	9	US Open, New York, United States	Hard	2R	6–1, 6–4, 0–1, ret.	136
3.	(Chile) Marcelo Ríos	10	US Open, New York, United States	Hard	4R	6–2, 6–3, 7–5	136
4.	(United Kingdom) Tim Henman	7	Toulouse, France	Hard (i)	2R	6–4, 6–2	80
2000
5.	(Netherlands) Richard Krajicek	10	Australian Open, Melbourne, Australia	Hard	2R	2–6, 6–3, 6–1, 6–3	34
6.	(Brazil) Gustavo Kuerten	5	Davis Cup, Florianopolis, Brazil	Clay	RR	6–2, 7–6^{(7–3)}	30
7.	(Russia) Marat Safin	2	Vienna, Austria	Hard (i)	1R	5–7, 6–3, 7–6^{(7–5)}	37
2001
8.	(United Kingdom) Tim Henman	10	Rotterdam, Netherlands	Hard (i)	2R	6–3, 7–5	60
9.	(Russia) Yevgeny Kafelnikov	5	Hamburg, Germany	Clay	1R	7–5, 7–5	36
10.	(France) Sébastien Grosjean	8	Wimbledon, London, United Kingdom	Grass	3R	5–7, 6–4, 6–3, 6–4	38
11.	(Australia) Lleyton Hewitt	5	Wimbledon, London, United Kingdom	Grass	4R	4–6, 6–4, 6–3, 4–6, 6–4	38
12.	(Russia) Marat Safin	3	Montreal, Canada	Hard	1R	6–4, 5–2, ret.	28
13.	(Australia) Lleyton Hewitt	1	Davis Cup, Melbourne, Australia	Grass	RR	4–6, 6–3, 3–6, 6–3, 6–4	27
2002
14.	(Spain) Juan Carlos Ferrero	3	Rotterdam, Netherlands	Hard (i)	1R	5–7, 6–1, 6–0	22
15.	(France) Sébastien Grosjean	10	Rotterdam, Netherlands	Hard (i)	SF	4–6, 7–6^{(7–1)}, 7–5	22
16.	(Spain) Albert Costa	8	Moscow, Russia	Carpet (i)	1R	7–5, 3–6, 6–1	48
17.	(Russia) Yevgeny Kafelnikov	10	Lyon, France	Carpet (i)	2R	7–6^{(7–5)}, 6–4	41
18.	(United Kingdom) Tim Henman	9	Paris, France	Carpet (i)	3R	6–4, 6–2	41
2003
19.	(Czech Republic) Jiří Novák	10	Marseille, France	Hard (i)	1R	6–2, 6–1	40
20.	(Spain) Albert Costa	8	Rotterdam, Netherlands	Hard (i)	1R	6–3, 6–3	41
