= 1999 ATP Tour =

Men's tennis circuit

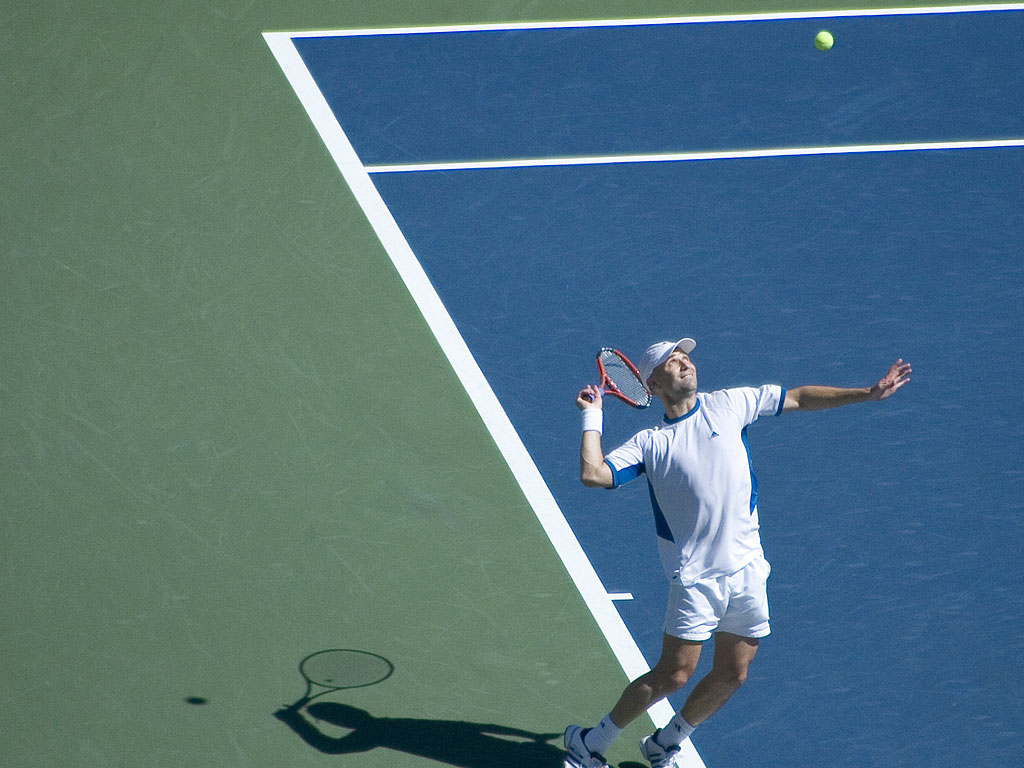
- Andre Agassi finished the year ranked world No. 1 for the first time in his career. He won five titles during the season, including two majors at the French Open (completing the career Grand Slam) and the US Open. He also won an ATP Super 9 title and finished runner-up at another major at the Wimbledon Championships.

Details
- Duration: 4 January 1999 – 29 November 1999
- Edition: 30th
- Tournaments: 73
- Categories: Grand Slam (4); ATP Super 9 (9); ATP Championship Series (11); ATP World Series (45)

Achievements (singles)
- Most titles: (United States) Pete Sampras (5) (United States) Andre Agassi (5) (Sweden) Magnus Norman (5)
- Most finals: (United States) Andre Agassi (8)
- Prize money leader: (United States) Andre Agassi ($4,261,120)
- Points leader: (United States) Andre Agassi (5048)

Awards
- Player of the year: (United States) Andre Agassi
- Doubles team of the year: (India) Leander Paes (India) Mahesh Bhupathi
- Most improved player of the year: (Ecuador) Nicolás Lapentti
- Newcomer of the year: (Spain) Juan Carlos Ferrero
- Comeback player of the year: (United States) Chris Woodruff

The Association of Tennis Professionals (ATP) Tour is the elite professional tennis circuit organised by the ATP. The 1999 ATP Tour calendar comprises the Grand Slam tournaments, supervised by the International Tennis Federation (ITF), the ATP Super 9, the ATP Championship Series, the ATP World Series, the ATP World Team Cup, the ATP Tour World Championships and the Grand Slam Cup (organised by the ITF). Also included in the 1999 calendar are the Davis Cup and the Hopman Cup, which do not distribute ranking points, and are both organised by the ITF.

In April 1999 ATP signed a $1.2 billion 10-year-deal with the sports marketing agency ISL Worldwide to promote the sport. The deal gave ISL the commercial rights for the Super-9 tournaments as well as the ATP World Championship. The ATP also introduced a simplified ranking system and made participation in the Super-9 events mandatory for top players.

== Schedule ==
This is the complete schedule of events on the 1999 calendar, with player progression documented from the quarterfinals stage.

Key

Grand Slam
ATP Tour World Championships
ATP Super 9
ATP Championship Series
ATP World Series
Team Events

=== January ===
Week	Tournament	Champions	Runners-up	Semifinalists	Quarterfinalists
4 Jan	Hopman Cup; Perth, Australia; ITF Mixed Team Championships; Hard (i) – $900,000 – 8 teams (RR)	Australia; 2–1	Sweden	Round Robin losers (Group A) South Africa; France; Spain / Zimbabwe	Round Robin losers (Group B) United States; Switzerland; Slovakia
4 Jan	AAPT Championships; Adelaide, Australia; ATP World Series; Hard – $350,000 – 32S/16D; Singles – Doubles	(Sweden) Thomas Enqvist; 4–6, 6–1, 6–2	(Australia) Lleyton Hewitt	(Australia) Jason Stoltenberg (Australia) Scott Draper	(Czech Republic) Slava Doseděl (Zimbabwe) Byron Black (Australia) Michael Tebbutt (Slovakia) Dominik Hrbatý
4 Jan	AAPT Championships; Adelaide, Australia; ATP World Series; Hard – $350,000 – 32S/16D; Singles – Doubles	(Brazil) Gustavo Kuerten (Ecuador) Nicolás Lapentti; 6–4, 6–4	(United States) Jim Courier (United States) Patrick Galbraith	(Australia) Jason Stoltenberg (Australia) Scott Draper	(Czech Republic) Slava Doseděl (Zimbabwe) Byron Black (Australia) Michael Tebbutt (Slovakia) Dominik Hrbatý
4 Jan	Qatar Mobil Open; Doha, Qatar; ATP World Series; Hard – $1,000,000 – 32S/16D; Singles – Doubles	(Germany) Rainer Schüttler; 6–4, 5–7, 6–1	(United Kingdom) Tim Henman	(Morocco) Karim Alami (France) Cédric Pioline	(United States) Jeff Tarango (Morocco) Hicham Arazi (Croatia) Goran Ivanišević (Argentina) Mariano Zabaleta
4 Jan	Qatar Mobil Open; Doha, Qatar; ATP World Series; Hard – $1,000,000 – 32S/16D; Singles – Doubles	(United States) Alex O'Brien (United States) Jared Palmer; 6–3, 6–4	(South Africa) Piet Norval (Zimbabwe) Kevin Ullyett	(Morocco) Karim Alami (France) Cédric Pioline	(United States) Jeff Tarango (Morocco) Hicham Arazi (Croatia) Goran Ivanišević (Argentina) Mariano Zabaleta
11 Jan	Heineken Open; Auckland, New Zealand; ATP World Series; Hard – $350,000 – 32S/16D; Singles – Doubles	(Netherlands) Sjeng Schalken; 6–4, 6–4	(Germany) Tommy Haas	(New Zealand) Brett Steven (Spain) Félix Mantilla	(Romania) Andrei Pavel (Argentina) Mariano Zabaleta (France) Guillaume Raoux (Slovakia) Dominik Hrbatý
11 Jan	Heineken Open; Auckland, New Zealand; ATP World Series; Hard – $350,000 – 32S/16D; Singles – Doubles	(United States) Jeff Tarango (Czech Republic) Daniel Vacek; 7–5, 7–5	(Czech Republic) Jiří Novák (Czech Republic) David Rikl	(New Zealand) Brett Steven (Spain) Félix Mantilla	(Romania) Andrei Pavel (Argentina) Mariano Zabaleta (France) Guillaume Raoux (Slovakia) Dominik Hrbatý
11 Jan	Sydney International; Sydney, Australia; ATP World Series; Hard – $350,000 – 32S/16D; Singles – Doubles	(United States) Todd Martin; 6–3, 7–6^{(7–5)}	(Spain) Àlex Corretja	(Slovakia) Karol Kučera (Austria) Thomas Muster	(Spain) Albert Costa (Brazil) Gustavo Kuerten (Australia) Jason Stoltenberg (Australia) Lleyton Hewitt
11 Jan	Sydney International; Sydney, Australia; ATP World Series; Hard – $350,000 – 32S/16D; Singles – Doubles	(Canada) Sébastien Lareau (Canada) Daniel Nestor; 6–3, 6–4	(United States) Patrick Galbraith (Netherlands) Paul Haarhuis	(Slovakia) Karol Kučera (Austria) Thomas Muster	(Spain) Albert Costa (Brazil) Gustavo Kuerten (Australia) Jason Stoltenberg (Australia) Lleyton Hewitt
18 Jan; 25 Jan	Australian Open; Melbourne, Australia; Grand Slam; Hard – $3,539,387; 128S/128Q/64D/32X; Singles – Doubles; Mixed doubles	(Russia) Yevgeny Kafelnikov; 4–6, 6–0, 6–3, 7–6^{(7–1)}	(Sweden) Thomas Enqvist	(Germany) Tommy Haas (Ecuador) Nicolás Lapentti	(United States) Todd Martin (United States) Vincent Spadea (Switzerland) Marc Rosset (Slovakia) Karol Kučera
18 Jan; 25 Jan	Australian Open; Melbourne, Australia; Grand Slam; Hard – $3,539,387; 128S/128Q/64D/32X; Singles – Doubles; Mixed doubles	(Sweden) Jonas Björkman (Australia) Patrick Rafter; 6–3, 4–6, 6–4, 6–7^{(10–12)}, 6–4	(India) Mahesh Bhupathi (India) Leander Paes	(Germany) Tommy Haas (Ecuador) Nicolás Lapentti	(United States) Todd Martin (United States) Vincent Spadea (Switzerland) Marc Rosset (Slovakia) Karol Kučera
18 Jan; 25 Jan	Australian Open; Melbourne, Australia; Grand Slam; Hard – $3,539,387; 128S/128Q/64D/32X; Singles – Doubles; Mixed doubles	(South Africa) David Adams (South Africa) Mariaan de Swardt; 6–4, 4–6, 7–6^{(7–5)}	(Belarus) Max Mirnyi (United States) Serena Williams	(Germany) Tommy Haas (Ecuador) Nicolás Lapentti	(United States) Todd Martin (United States) Vincent Spadea (Switzerland) Marc Rosset (Slovakia) Karol Kučera

=== February ===
Week	Tournament	Champions	Runners-up	Semifinalists	Quarterfinalists
1 Feb	Open 13; Marseille, France; ATP World Series; Hard (i) – $539,250 – 32S/16D; Singles – Doubles	(France) Fabrice Santoro; 6–3, 4–6, 6–4	(France) Arnaud Clément	(France) Cédric Pioline (Switzerland) Marc Rosset	(Switzerland) Roger Federer (France) Nicolas Escudé (Italy) Gianluca Pozzi (Slovakia) Dominik Hrbatý
1 Feb	Open 13; Marseille, France; ATP World Series; Hard (i) – $539,250 – 32S/16D; Singles – Doubles	(Belarus) Max Mirnyi (Russia) Andrei Olhovskiy; 7–5, 7–6^{(9–7)}	(South Africa) David Adams (Czech Republic) Pavel Vízner	(France) Cédric Pioline (Switzerland) Marc Rosset	(Switzerland) Roger Federer (France) Nicolas Escudé (Italy) Gianluca Pozzi (Slovakia) Dominik Hrbatý
8 Feb	Dubai Tennis Championships; Dubai, United Arab Emirates; ATP World Series; Hard – $1,039,250 – 32S/16D; Singles – Doubles	(France) Jérôme Golmard; 6–4, 6–2	(Germany) Nicolas Kiefer	(Australia) Andrew Ilie (Spain) Carlos Moyá	(Brazil) Gustavo Kuerten (Spain) Francisco Clavet (United Kingdom) Tim Henman (Spain) Félix Mantilla
8 Feb	Dubai Tennis Championships; Dubai, United Arab Emirates; ATP World Series; Hard – $1,039,250 – 32S/16D; Singles – Doubles	(Zimbabwe) Wayne Black (Australia) Sandon Stolle; 4–6, 6–1, 6–4	(South Africa) David Adams (South Africa) John-Laffnie de Jager	(Australia) Andrew Ilie (Spain) Carlos Moyá	(Brazil) Gustavo Kuerten (Spain) Francisco Clavet (United Kingdom) Tim Henman (Spain) Félix Mantilla
8 Feb	Sybase Open; San Jose, United States; ATP World Series; Hard (i) – $350,000 – 32S/16D; Singles – Doubles	(Australia) Mark Philippoussis; 6–3, 6–2	(Philippines) Cecil Mamiit	(United States) Pete Sampras (United States) Michael Chang	(Germany) Bernd Karbacher (United States) Justin Gimelstob (Norway) Christian Ruud (Australia) Mark Woodforde
8 Feb	Sybase Open; San Jose, United States; ATP World Series; Hard (i) – $350,000 – 32S/16D; Singles – Doubles	(Australia) Todd Woodbridge (Australia) Mark Woodforde; 7–5, 6–7^{(3–7)}, 6–4	(North Macedonia) Aleksandar Kitinov (Federal Republic of Yugoslavia) Nenad Zimonjić	(United States) Pete Sampras (United States) Michael Chang	(Germany) Bernd Karbacher (United States) Justin Gimelstob (Norway) Christian Ruud (Australia) Mark Woodforde
8 Feb	St. Petersburg Open; St. Petersburg, Russia; ATP World Series; Carpet (i) – $350,000 – 32S/24Q/16D; Singles – Doubles	(Switzerland) Marc Rosset; 6–3, 6–4	(Germany) David Prinosil	(Netherlands) Jan Siemerink (Russia) Marat Safin	(Russia) Igor Kornienko (France) Guillaume Raoux (Slovakia) Dominik Hrbatý (Romania) Andrei Pavel
8 Feb	St. Petersburg Open; St. Petersburg, Russia; ATP World Series; Carpet (i) – $350,000 – 32S/24Q/16D; Singles – Doubles	(United States) Jeff Tarango (Czech Republic) Daniel Vacek; 3–6, 6–3, 7–5	(Netherlands) Menno Oosting (Romania) Andrei Pavel	(Netherlands) Jan Siemerink (Russia) Marat Safin	(Russia) Igor Kornienko (France) Guillaume Raoux (Slovakia) Dominik Hrbatý (Romania) Andrei Pavel
15 Feb	Kroger St. Jude International; Memphis, United States; ATP Championship Series; Hard (i) – $825,000 – 48S/24Q/24D; Singles – Doubles	(Germany) Tommy Haas; 6–4, 6–1	(United States) Jim Courier	(United States) Todd Martin (Netherlands) John van Lottum	(United States) Jan-Michael Gambill (Australia) Andrew Ilie (Argentina) Mariano Puerta (Canada) Daniel Nestor
15 Feb	Kroger St. Jude International; Memphis, United States; ATP Championship Series; Hard (i) – $825,000 – 48S/24Q/24D; Singles – Doubles	(Australia) Todd Woodbridge (Australia) Mark Woodforde; 6–3, 6–4	(Canada) Sébastien Lareau (United States) Alex O'Brien	(United States) Todd Martin (Netherlands) John van Lottum	(United States) Jan-Michael Gambill (Australia) Andrew Ilie (Argentina) Mariano Puerta (Canada) Daniel Nestor
15 Feb	ABN AMRO World Tennis Tournament; Rotterdam, Netherlands; ATP Championship Series; Carpet (i) – $850,000 – 32S/16D; Singles – Doubles	(Russia) Yevgeny Kafelnikov; 6–2, 7–6^{(7–3)}	(United Kingdom) Tim Henman	(Russia) Marat Safin (United Kingdom) Greg Rusedski	(South Africa) Wayne Ferreira (Slovakia) Karol Kučera (France) Cédric Pioline (Switzerland) Roger Federer
15 Feb	ABN AMRO World Tennis Tournament; Rotterdam, Netherlands; ATP Championship Series; Carpet (i) – $850,000 – 32S/16D; Singles – Doubles	(South Africa) David Adams (South Africa) John-Laffnie de Jager; 6–7^{(5–7)}, 6–3, 6–4	(United Kingdom) Neil Broad (Australia) Peter Tramacchi	(Russia) Marat Safin (United Kingdom) Greg Rusedski	(South Africa) Wayne Ferreira (Slovakia) Karol Kučera (France) Cédric Pioline (Switzerland) Roger Federer
22 Feb	Guardian Direct Cup; London, United Kingdom; ATP Championship Series; Carpet (i) – $814,250 – 32S/16D; Singles – Doubles	(Netherlands) Richard Krajicek; 7–6^{(8–6)}, 6–7^{(5–7)}, 7–5	(United Kingdom) Greg Rusedski	(Sweden) Thomas Johansson (Morocco) Hicham Arazi	(Russia) Yevgeny Kafelnikov (Slovakia) Karol Kučera (Sweden) Thomas Enqvist (Slovakia) Dominik Hrbatý
22 Feb	Guardian Direct Cup; London, United Kingdom; ATP Championship Series; Carpet (i) – $814,250 – 32S/16D; Singles – Doubles	(United Kingdom) Tim Henman (United Kingdom) Greg Rusedski; 6–3, 7–6^{(8–6)}	(Zimbabwe) Byron Black (South Africa) Wayne Ferreira	(Sweden) Thomas Johansson (Morocco) Hicham Arazi	(Russia) Yevgeny Kafelnikov (Slovakia) Karol Kučera (Sweden) Thomas Enqvist (Slovakia) Dominik Hrbatý

=== March ===
Week	Tournament	Champions	Runners-up	Semifinalists	Quarterfinalists
1 Mar	Copenhagen Open; Copenhagen, Denmark; ATP World Series; Hard (i) – $240,000 – 32S/16D; Singles – Doubles	(Sweden) Magnus Gustafsson; 6–4, 6–1	(France) Fabrice Santoro	(France) Sébastien Grosjean (Zimbabwe) Byron Black	(Canada) Daniel Nestor (Germany) Rainer Schüttler (Zimbabwe) Wayne Black (Belarus) Max Mirnyi
1 Mar	Copenhagen Open; Copenhagen, Denmark; ATP World Series; Hard (i) – $240,000 – 32S/16D; Singles – Doubles	(Belarus) Max Mirnyi (Russia) Andrei Olhovskiy; 6–7^{(5–7)}, 7–6^{(7–4)}, 6–1	(Germany) Marc-Kevin Goellner (Germany) David Prinosil	(France) Sébastien Grosjean (Zimbabwe) Byron Black	(Canada) Daniel Nestor (Germany) Rainer Schüttler (Zimbabwe) Wayne Black (Belarus) Max Mirnyi
1 Mar	Tennis Channel Open; Scottsdale, United States; ATP World Series; Hard – $350,000 – 32S/16D; Singles – Doubles	(United States) Jan-Michael Gambill; 7–6^{(7–2)}, 4–6, 6–4	(Australia) Lleyton Hewitt	(United States) Andre Agassi (Australia) Mark Woodforde	(United States) Justin Gimelstob (France) Cédric Pioline (Croatia) Goran Ivanišević (France) Jérôme Golmard
1 Mar	Tennis Channel Open; Scottsdale, United States; ATP World Series; Hard – $350,000 – 32S/16D; Singles – Doubles	(United States) Justin Gimelstob (United States) Richey Reneberg; 6–4, 6–7^{(4–7)}, 6–3	(The Bahamas) Mark Knowles (Australia) Sandon Stolle	(United States) Andre Agassi (Australia) Mark Woodforde	(United States) Justin Gimelstob (France) Cédric Pioline (Croatia) Goran Ivanišević (France) Jérôme Golmard
8 Mar	Newsweek Champions Cup; Indian Wells, United States; ATP Super 9 Hard – $2,200,000 – 56S/28Q/28D/8Q; Singles – Doubles	(Australia) Mark Philippoussis; 5–7, 6–4, 6–4, 4–6, 6–2	(Spain) Carlos Moyá	(United States) Chris Woodruff (Brazil) Gustavo Kuerten	(United Kingdom) Tim Henman (United States) Todd Martin (Slovakia) Karol Kučera (Netherlands) Richard Krajicek
8 Mar	Newsweek Champions Cup; Indian Wells, United States; ATP Super 9 Hard – $2,200,000 – 56S/28Q/28D/8Q; Singles – Doubles	(Zimbabwe) Wayne Black (Australia) Sandon Stolle; 7–6^{(7–4)}, 6–3	(South Africa) Ellis Ferreira (United States) Rick Leach	(United States) Chris Woodruff (Brazil) Gustavo Kuerten	(United Kingdom) Tim Henman (United States) Todd Martin (Slovakia) Karol Kučera (Netherlands) Richard Krajicek
15 Mar; 22 Mar	Lipton Championships; Key Biscayne, United States; ATP Super 9 Hard – $2,450,000 – 96S/48Q/48D/8Q; Singles – Doubles	(Netherlands) Richard Krajicek; 4–6, 6–1, 6–2, 7–5	(France) Sébastien Grosjean	(Spain) Francisco Clavet (Sweden) Thomas Enqvist	(Slovakia) Dominik Hrbatý (Germany) Nicolas Kiefer (France) Jérôme Golmard (United States) Pete Sampras
15 Mar; 22 Mar	Lipton Championships; Key Biscayne, United States; ATP Super 9 Hard – $2,450,000 – 96S/48Q/48D/8Q; Singles – Doubles	(Zimbabwe) Wayne Black (Australia) Sandon Stolle; 6–1, 6–1	(Germany) Boris Becker (United States) Jan-Michael Gambill	(Spain) Francisco Clavet (Sweden) Thomas Enqvist	(Slovakia) Dominik Hrbatý (Germany) Nicolas Kiefer (France) Jérôme Golmard (United States) Pete Sampras
22 Mar	Grand Prix Hassan II; Casablanca, Morocco; ATP World Series; Clay – $240,000 – 32S/27Q/16D; Singles – Doubles	(Spain) Alberto Martín; 6–3, 6–4	(Spain) Fernando Vicente	(Austria) Markus Hipfl (Spain) Juan Carlos Ferrero	(Belgium) Johan Van Herck (Austria) Stefan Koubek (Spain) Albert Portas (Germany) Jens Knippschild
22 Mar	Grand Prix Hassan II; Casablanca, Morocco; ATP World Series; Clay – $240,000 – 32S/27Q/16D; Singles – Doubles	(Brazil) Fernando Meligeni (Brazil) Jaime Oncins; 6–2, 6–3	(Italy) Massimo Ardinghi (Italy) Vincenzo Santopadre	(Austria) Markus Hipfl (Spain) Juan Carlos Ferrero	(Belgium) Johan Van Herck (Austria) Stefan Koubek (Spain) Albert Portas (Germany) Jens Knippschild
29 Mar	Davis Cup first round Trollhättan, Sweden – hard (i); Frankfurt, Germany – carpet (i); Birmingham, United Kingdom – hard (i); Harare, Zimbabwe – hard (i); Nîmes, France – clay (i); Lleida, Spain – clay Ghent, Belgium – clay (i); Neuchâtel, Switzerland – carpet (i)	First-round winners Slovakia 3–2; Russia 3–2; United States 3–2; Australia 4–1; France 4–1; Brazil 3–2; Belgium 3–2; Switzerland 3–2	First-round losers Sweden; Germany; Great Britain; Zimbabwe; Netherlands; Spain; Czech Republic; Italy		

=== April ===
Week	Tournament	Champions	Runners-up	Semifinalists	Quarterfinalists
5 Apr	Gold Flake Open; Chennai, India; ATP World Series; Hard – $430,000 – 32S/16D; Singles – Doubles	(Zimbabwe) Byron Black; 6–4, 1–6, 6–3	(Germany) Rainer Schüttler	(Netherlands) Peter Wessels (Netherlands) John van Lottum	(Spain) Carlos Moyá (Italy) Vincenzo Santopadre (Australia) Richard Fromberg (Sweden) Mikael Tillström
5 Apr	Gold Flake Open; Chennai, India; ATP World Series; Hard – $430,000 – 32S/16D; Singles – Doubles	(India) Mahesh Bhupathi (India) Leander Paes; 4–6, 7–5, 6–4	(Zimbabwe) Wayne Black (South Africa) Neville Godwin	(Netherlands) Peter Wessels (Netherlands) John van Lottum	(Spain) Carlos Moyá (Italy) Vincenzo Santopadre (Australia) Richard Fromberg (Sweden) Mikael Tillström
5 Apr	Estoril Open; Oeiras, Portugal; ATP World Series; Clay – $625,000 – 32S/16D; Singles – Doubles	(Spain) Albert Costa; 7–6^{(7–4)}, 2–6, 6–3	(United States) Todd Martin	(France) Jérôme Golmard (Chile) Marcelo Ríos	(Morocco) Karim Alami (Spain) Félix Mantilla (Brazil) Gustavo Kuerten (Brazil) Fernando Meligeni
5 Apr	Estoril Open; Oeiras, Portugal; ATP World Series; Clay – $625,000 – 32S/16D; Singles – Doubles	(Spain) Tomás Carbonell (United States) Donald Johnson; 6–3, 2–6, 6–1	(Czech Republic) Jiří Novák (Czech Republic) David Rikl	(France) Jérôme Golmard (Chile) Marcelo Ríos	(Morocco) Karim Alami (Spain) Félix Mantilla (Brazil) Gustavo Kuerten (Brazil) Fernando Meligeni
5 Apr	Salem Open; Hong Kong SAR; ATP World Series; Hard – $350,000 – 32S/16D; Singles – Doubles	(United States) Andre Agassi; 6–7^{(4–7)}, 6–4, 6–4	(Germany) Boris Becker	(Germany) Hendrik Dreekmann (Germany) Bernd Karbacher	(Netherlands) Richard Krajicek (Germany) Nicolas Kiefer (Italy) Laurence Tieleman (Sweden) Jonas Björkman
5 Apr	Salem Open; Hong Kong SAR; ATP World Series; Hard – $350,000 – 32S/16D; Singles – Doubles	(New Zealand) James Greenhalgh (Australia) Grant Silcock; Walkover	(United States) Andre Agassi (United States) David Wheaton	(Germany) Hendrik Dreekmann (Germany) Bernd Karbacher	(Netherlands) Richard Krajicek (Germany) Nicolas Kiefer (Italy) Laurence Tieleman (Sweden) Jonas Björkman
12 Apr	Japan Open Tennis Championships; Tokyo, Japan; ATP Championship Series; Hard – $725,000 – 56S/28D; Singles – Doubles	(Germany) Nicolas Kiefer; 7–6^{(7–5)}, 7–5	(South Africa) Wayne Ferreira	(Sweden) Jonas Björkman (Sweden) Thomas Johansson	(Netherlands) Richard Krajicek (Sweden) Thomas Enqvist (Canada) Sébastien Lareau (Denmark) Kenneth Carlsen
12 Apr	Japan Open Tennis Championships; Tokyo, Japan; ATP Championship Series; Hard – $725,000 – 56S/28D; Singles – Doubles	(United States) Jeff Tarango (Czech Republic) Daniel Vacek; 4–3, retired	(Zimbabwe) Wayne Black (United States) Brian MacPhie	(Sweden) Jonas Björkman (Sweden) Thomas Johansson	(Netherlands) Richard Krajicek (Sweden) Thomas Enqvist (Canada) Sébastien Lareau (Denmark) Kenneth Carlsen
12 Apr	Torneo Godó; Barcelona, Spain; ATP Championship Series; Clay – $950,000 – 56S/28D; Singles – Doubles	(Spain) Félix Mantilla; 7–6^{(7–2)}, 6–3, 6–3	(Morocco) Karim Alami	(United States) Todd Martin (Spain) Francisco Clavet	(Spain) Albert Costa (Spain) Alberto Berasategui (Brazil) Fernando Meligeni (Spain) Carlos Moyá
12 Apr	Torneo Godó; Barcelona, Spain; ATP Championship Series; Clay – $950,000 – 56S/28D; Singles – Doubles	(Netherlands) Paul Haarhuis (Russia) Yevgeny Kafelnikov; 7–5, 6–3	(Italy) Massimo Bertolini (Italy) Cristian Brandi	(United States) Todd Martin (Spain) Francisco Clavet	(Spain) Albert Costa (Spain) Alberto Berasategui (Brazil) Fernando Meligeni (Spain) Carlos Moyá
19 Apr	Republic Nat'l Bank Monte Carlo Open; Roquebrune-Cap-Martin, France; ATP Super 9 Clay – $2,200,000 – 56S/28D; Singles – Doubles	(Brazil) Gustavo Kuerten; 6–4, 2–1 retired	(Chile) Marcelo Ríos	(France) Jérôme Golmard (Spain) Félix Mantilla	(Spain) Carlos Moyá (Australia) Mark Philippoussis (United States) Vince Spadea (Spain) Albert Costa
19 Apr	Republic Nat'l Bank Monte Carlo Open; Roquebrune-Cap-Martin, France; ATP Super 9 Clay – $2,200,000 – 56S/28D; Singles – Doubles	(France) Olivier Delaître (United Kingdom) Tim Henman; 6–2, 6–3	(Czech Republic) Jiří Novák (Czech Republic) David Rikl	(France) Jérôme Golmard (Spain) Félix Mantilla	(Spain) Carlos Moyá (Australia) Mark Philippoussis (United States) Vince Spadea (Spain) Albert Costa
19 Apr	ERA Real Estate Clay Court Ch'ships; Orlando, United States; ATP World Series; Clay – $289,250 (green) – 32S/16D; Singles – Doubles	(Sweden) Magnus Norman; 6–0, 6–3	(Argentina) Guillermo Cañas	(Norway) Christian Ruud (Belarus) Max Mirnyi	(Argentina) Hernán Gumy (Spain) Alberto Martín (United States) Jim Courier (Romania) Gabriel Trifu
19 Apr	ERA Real Estate Clay Court Ch'ships; Orlando, United States; ATP World Series; Clay – $289,250 (green) – 32S/16D; Singles – Doubles	(United States) Jim Courier (Australia) Todd Woodbridge; 7–6^{(7–4)}, 6–4	(United States) Bob Bryan (United States) Mike Bryan	(Norway) Christian Ruud (Belarus) Max Mirnyi	(Argentina) Hernán Gumy (Spain) Alberto Martín (United States) Jim Courier (Romania) Gabriel Trifu
26 Apr	BMW Open; Munich, Germany; ATP World Series; Clay – $525,000 – 32S/16D; Singles – Doubles	(Argentina) Franco Squillari; 6–4, 6–3	(Romania) Andrei Pavel	(Argentina) Mariano Zabaleta (Spain) Alberto Berasategui	(Germany) Lars Burgsmüller (Germany) Michael Kohlmann (Italy) Vincenzo Santopadre (Germany) Hendrik Dreekmann
26 Apr	BMW Open; Munich, Germany; ATP World Series; Clay – $525,000 – 32S/16D; Singles – Doubles	(Argentina) Daniel Orsanic (Argentina) Mariano Puerta; 7–6^{(7–3)}, 3–6, 7–6^{(7–3)}	(Italy) Massimo Bertolini (Italy) Cristian Brandi	(Argentina) Mariano Zabaleta (Spain) Alberto Berasategui	(Germany) Lars Burgsmüller (Germany) Michael Kohlmann (Italy) Vincenzo Santopadre (Germany) Hendrik Dreekmann
26 Apr	AT&T Challenge; Atlanta, United States; ATP World Series; Clay – $350,000 (green) – 32S/16D; Singles – Doubles	(Austria) Stefan Koubek; 6–1, 6–2	(France) Sébastien Grosjean	(United States) Jim Courier (Sweden) Magnus Larsson	(Argentina) Martín Rodríguez (Armenia) Sargis Sargsian (Spain) Alberto Martín (Australia) Jason Stoltenberg
26 Apr	AT&T Challenge; Atlanta, United States; ATP World Series; Clay – $350,000 (green) – 32S/16D; Singles – Doubles	(United States) Patrick Galbraith (United States) Justin Gimelstob; 5–7, 7–6^{(7–4)}, 6–3	(Australia) Todd Woodbridge (Australia) Mark Woodforde	(United States) Jim Courier (Sweden) Magnus Larsson	(Argentina) Martín Rodríguez (Armenia) Sargis Sargsian (Spain) Alberto Martín (Australia) Jason Stoltenberg
26 Apr	Paegas Czech Open; Prague, Czech Republic; ATP World Series; Clay – $500,000 – 32S/16D; Singles – Doubles	(Slovakia) Dominik Hrbatý; 6–2, 6–2	(Czech Republic) Slava Doseděl	(Czech Republic) Michal Tabara (Spain) Germán Puentes	(Bulgaria) Orlin Stanoytchev (Brazil) Fernando Meligeni (France) Arnaud Di Pasquale (Spain) Eduardo Nicolás
26 Apr	Paegas Czech Open; Prague, Czech Republic; ATP World Series; Clay – $500,000 – 32S/16D; Singles – Doubles	(Czech Republic) Martin Damm (Czech Republic) Radek Štěpánek; 6–0, 6–2	(United States) Mark Keil (Ecuador) Nicolás Lapentti	(Czech Republic) Michal Tabara (Spain) Germán Puentes	(Bulgaria) Orlin Stanoytchev (Brazil) Fernando Meligeni (France) Arnaud Di Pasquale (Spain) Eduardo Nicolás

=== May ===
Week	Tournament	Champions	Runners-up	Semifinalists	Quarterfinalists
3 May	Licher German Open; Hamburg, Germany; ATP Super 9 Clay – $2,200,000 – 56S/28Q/28D/8Q; Singles – Doubles	(Chile) Marcelo Ríos; 6–7^{(5–7)}, 7–5, 5–7, 7–6^{(7–5)}, 6–2	(Argentina) Mariano Zabaleta	(Ecuador) Nicolás Lapentti (Spain) Carlos Moyá	(France) Arnaud Di Pasquale (United Kingdom) Tim Henman (Germany) Tommy Haas (Brazil) Gustavo Kuerten
3 May	Licher German Open; Hamburg, Germany; ATP Super 9 Clay – $2,200,000 – 56S/28Q/28D/8Q; Singles – Doubles	(Australia) Wayne Arthurs (Australia) Andrew Kratzmann; 2–6, 7–6^{(7–5)}, 6–2	(Netherlands) Paul Haarhuis (United States) Jared Palmer	(Ecuador) Nicolás Lapentti (Spain) Carlos Moyá	(France) Arnaud Di Pasquale (United Kingdom) Tim Henman (Germany) Tommy Haas (Brazil) Gustavo Kuerten
3 May	Citrix Tennis Championships; Delray Beach, United States; ATP World Series; Clay – $270,000 (green) – 32S/16D; Singles – Doubles	(Australia) Lleyton Hewitt; 6–4, 6–7^{(2–7)}, 6–1	(Belgium) Xavier Malisse	(Australia) Scott Draper (France) Sébastien Grosjean	(Argentina) Hernán Gumy (Sweden) Magnus Larsson (Armenia) Sargis Sargsian (Philippines) Cecil Mamiit
3 May	Citrix Tennis Championships; Delray Beach, United States; ATP World Series; Clay – $270,000 (green) – 32S/16D; Singles – Doubles	(Belarus) Max Mirnyi (Federal Republic of Yugoslavia) Nenad Zimonjić; 7–6^{(7–3)}, 3–6, 6–3	(United States) Doug Flach (United States) Brian MacPhie	(Australia) Scott Draper (France) Sébastien Grosjean	(Argentina) Hernán Gumy (Sweden) Magnus Larsson (Armenia) Sargis Sargsian (Philippines) Cecil Mamiit
10 May	Italian Open; Rome, Italy; ATP Super 9 Clay – $2,200,000 – 64S/32D/8Q; Singles – Doubles	(Brazil) Gustavo Kuerten; 6–4, 7–5, 7–6^{(8–6)}	(Australia) Patrick Rafter	(Spain) Àlex Corretja (Spain) Félix Mantilla	(Slovakia) Karol Kučera (Argentina) Franco Squillari (Ecuador) Nicolás Lapentti (Germany) David Prinosil
10 May	Italian Open; Rome, Italy; ATP Super 9 Clay – $2,200,000 – 64S/32D/8Q; Singles – Doubles	(South Africa) Ellis Ferreira (United States) Rick Leach; 6–7^{(0–7)}, 6–1, 6–2	(South Africa) David Adams (South Africa) John-Laffnie de Jager	(Spain) Àlex Corretja (Spain) Félix Mantilla	(Slovakia) Karol Kučera (Argentina) Franco Squillari (Ecuador) Nicolás Lapentti (Germany) David Prinosil
17 May	Peugeot ATP World Team Championship; Düsseldorf, Germany; ATP World Team Cup; Clay – $1,650,000 – 8 teams (RR)	Australia; 2–1	Sweden	Round-robin losers (Red Group) Spain; Germany; United Kingdom	Round-robin losers (Blue Group) United States; Slovakia; France
17 May	International Raiffeisen Grand Prix; Sankt Pölten, Austria; ATP World Series; Clay – $425,000 – 32S/16D; Singles – Doubles	(Chile) Marcelo Ríos; 4–4, retired	(Argentina) Mariano Zabaleta	(Russia) Yevgeny Kafelnikov (Morocco) Younes El Aynaoui	(Austria) Markus Hipfl (Spain) Francisco Clavet (Argentina) Guillermo Cañas (Austria) Stefan Koubek
17 May	International Raiffeisen Grand Prix; Sankt Pölten, Austria; ATP World Series; Clay – $425,000 – 32S/16D; Singles – Doubles	(Australia) Andrew Florent (Russia) Andrei Olhovskiy; 5–7, 6–4, 7–5	(South Africa) Brent Haygarth (South Africa) Robbie Koenig	(Russia) Yevgeny Kafelnikov (Morocco) Younes El Aynaoui	(Austria) Markus Hipfl (Spain) Francisco Clavet (Argentina) Guillermo Cañas (Austria) Stefan Koubek
24 May; 31 May	French Open; Paris, France; Grand Slam; Clay – $5,159,915; 128S/128Q/64D/48X; Singles – Doubles; Mixed doubles	(United States) Andre Agassi; 1–6, 2–6, 6–4, 6–3, 6–4	(Ukraine) Andrei Medvedev	(Slovakia) Dominik Hrbatý (Brazil) Fernando Meligeni	(Chile) Marcelo Ríos (Uruguay) Marcelo Filippini (Spain) Àlex Corretja (Brazil) Gustavo Kuerten
24 May; 31 May	French Open; Paris, France; Grand Slam; Clay – $5,159,915; 128S/128Q/64D/48X; Singles – Doubles; Mixed doubles	(India) Mahesh Bhupathi (India) Leander Paes; 6–2, 7–5	(Croatia) Goran Ivanišević (United States) Jeff Tarango	(Slovakia) Dominik Hrbatý (Brazil) Fernando Meligeni	(Chile) Marcelo Ríos (Uruguay) Marcelo Filippini (Spain) Àlex Corretja (Brazil) Gustavo Kuerten
24 May; 31 May	French Open; Paris, France; Grand Slam; Clay – $5,159,915; 128S/128Q/64D/48X; Singles – Doubles; Mixed doubles	(South Africa) Piet Norval (Slovenia) Katarina Srebotnik; 6–3, 3–6, 6–3	(United States) Rick Leach (Latvia) Larisa Neiland	(Slovakia) Dominik Hrbatý (Brazil) Fernando Meligeni	(Chile) Marcelo Ríos (Uruguay) Marcelo Filippini (Spain) Àlex Corretja (Brazil) Gustavo Kuerten

=== June ===
Week	Tournament	Champions	Runners-up	Semifinalists	Quarterfinalists
7 Jun	Gerry Weber Open; Halle, Germany; ATP World Series; Grass – $900,000 – 32S/16D; Singles – Doubles	(Germany) Nicolas Kiefer; 6–3, 6–2	(Sweden) Nicklas Kulti	(Czech Republic) Daniel Vacek (Spain) Carlos Moyá	(Netherlands) Jan Siemerink (Italy) Gianluca Pozzi (Germany) Tommy Haas (Netherlands) Sjeng Schalken
7 Jun	Gerry Weber Open; Halle, Germany; ATP World Series; Grass – $900,000 – 32S/16D; Singles – Doubles	(Sweden) Jonas Björkman (Australia) Patrick Rafter; 6–3, 7–5	(Netherlands) Paul Haarhuis (United States) Jared Palmer	(Czech Republic) Daniel Vacek (Spain) Carlos Moyá	(Netherlands) Jan Siemerink (Italy) Gianluca Pozzi (Germany) Tommy Haas (Netherlands) Sjeng Schalken
7 Jun	Stella Artois Championships; London, United Kingdom; ATP World Series; Grass – $750,000 – 56S/53Q/28D/8Q; Singles – Doubles	(United States) Pete Sampras; 6–7^{(1–7)}, 6–4, 7–6^{(7–4)}	(United Kingdom) Tim Henman	(Armenia) Sargis Sargsian (Australia) Lleyton Hewitt	(United Kingdom) Greg Rusedski (Slovakia) Karol Kučera (France) Cédric Pioline (Croatia) Goran Ivanišević
7 Jun	Stella Artois Championships; London, United Kingdom; ATP World Series; Grass – $750,000 – 56S/53Q/28D/8Q; Singles – Doubles	(Canada) Sébastien Lareau (United States) Alex O'Brien; 6–1, 7–6^{(7–3)}	(Australia) Todd Woodbridge (Australia) Mark Woodforde	(Armenia) Sargis Sargsian (Australia) Lleyton Hewitt	(United Kingdom) Greg Rusedski (Slovakia) Karol Kučera (France) Cédric Pioline (Croatia) Goran Ivanišević
7 Jun	Merano Open; Meran, Italy; ATP World Series; Clay – $350,000 – 32S/16D; Singles – Doubles	(Spain) Fernando Vicente; 6–2, 3–6, 7–6^{(7–1)}	(Morocco) Hicham Arazi	(Slovakia) Dominik Hrbatý (Italy) Andrea Gaudenzi	(Spain) Galo Blanco (Argentina) Guillermo Cañas (Austria) Martin Spöttl (Argentina) Martín Rodríguez
7 Jun	Merano Open; Meran, Italy; ATP World Series; Clay – $350,000 – 32S/16D; Singles – Doubles	(Argentina) Lucas Arnold Ker (Brazil) Jaime Oncins; 6–4, 7–6^{(7–1)}	(Germany) Marc-Kevin Goellner (Philippines) Eric Taino	(Slovakia) Dominik Hrbatý (Italy) Andrea Gaudenzi	(Spain) Galo Blanco (Argentina) Guillermo Cañas (Austria) Martin Spöttl (Argentina) Martín Rodríguez
14 Jun	Nottingham Open; Nottingham, United Kingdom; ATP World Series; Grass – $350,000 – 32S/16D; Singles – Doubles	(France) Cédric Pioline; 6–3, 7–5	(Zimbabwe) Kevin Ullyett	(United Kingdom) Greg Rusedski (Germany) David Prinosil	(Australia) Lleyton Hewitt (Australia) Andrew Ilie (France) Fabrice Santoro (Spain) Alberto Martín
14 Jun	Nottingham Open; Nottingham, United Kingdom; ATP World Series; Grass – $350,000 – 32S/16D; Singles – Doubles	(United States) Patrick Galbraith (United States) Justin Gimelstob; 5–7, 7–5, 6–3	(South Africa) Marius Barnard (South Africa) Brent Haygarth	(United Kingdom) Greg Rusedski (Germany) David Prinosil	(Australia) Lleyton Hewitt (Australia) Andrew Ilie (France) Fabrice Santoro (Spain) Alberto Martín
14 Jun	Heineken Trophy 's-Hertogenbosch, Netherlands; ATP World Series; Grass – $500,000 – 32S/20Q/16D; Singles – Doubles	(Australia) Patrick Rafter; 3–6, 7–6^{(9–7)}, 6–4	(Romania) Andrei Pavel	(Slovakia) Karol Kučera (Germany) Tommy Haas	(Sweden) Nicklas Kulti (Sweden) Jonas Björkman (Netherlands) Richard Krajicek (Denmark) Kenneth Carlsen
14 Jun	Heineken Trophy 's-Hertogenbosch, Netherlands; ATP World Series; Grass – $500,000 – 32S/20Q/16D; Singles – Doubles	final cancelled due to rain	(India) Leander Paes / (Netherlands) Jan Siemerink (South Africa) Ellis Ferreira / (Czech Republic) David Rikl	(Slovakia) Karol Kučera (Germany) Tommy Haas	(Sweden) Nicklas Kulti (Sweden) Jonas Björkman (Netherlands) Richard Krajicek (Denmark) Kenneth Carlsen
21 Jun; 28 Jun	Wimbledon Championships; London, United Kingdom; Grand Slam; Grass – $5,614,685 – 128S/64D/64X; Singles – Doubles; Mixed doubles	(United States) Pete Sampras; 6–3, 6–4, 7–5	(United States) Andre Agassi	(United Kingdom) Tim Henman (Australia) Patrick Rafter	(Australia) Mark Philippoussis (France) Cédric Pioline (Brazil) Gustavo Kuerten (United States) Todd Martin
21 Jun; 28 Jun	Wimbledon Championships; London, United Kingdom; Grand Slam; Grass – $5,614,685 – 128S/64D/64X; Singles – Doubles; Mixed doubles	(India) Mahesh Bhupathi (India) Leander Paes; 6–7^{(10–12)}, 6–3, 6–4, 7–6^{(7–4)}	(Netherlands) Paul Haarhuis (United States) Jared Palmer	(United Kingdom) Tim Henman (Australia) Patrick Rafter	(Australia) Mark Philippoussis (France) Cédric Pioline (Brazil) Gustavo Kuerten (United States) Todd Martin
21 Jun; 28 Jun	Wimbledon Championships; London, United Kingdom; Grand Slam; Grass – $5,614,685 – 128S/64D/64X; Singles – Doubles; Mixed doubles	(India) Leander Paes (United States) Lisa Raymond; 6–4, 3–6, 6–3	(Sweden) Jonas Björkman (Russia) Anna Kournikova	(United Kingdom) Tim Henman (Australia) Patrick Rafter	(Australia) Mark Philippoussis (France) Cédric Pioline (Brazil) Gustavo Kuerten (United States) Todd Martin

=== July ===
Week	Tournament	Champions	Runners-up	Semifinalists	Quarterfinalists
5 Jul	Investor Swedish Open; Båstad, Sweden; ATP World Series; Clay – $350,000 – 32S/16D; Singles – Doubles	(Costa Rica) Juan Antonio Marín; 6–3, 7–6^{(7–4)}	(Sweden) Andreas Vinciguerra	(Norway) Christian Ruud (Sweden) Nicklas Kulti	(Spain) Galo Blanco (Argentina) Martín Rodríguez (Sweden) Magnus Norman (Spain) Germán Puentes
5 Jul	Investor Swedish Open; Båstad, Sweden; ATP World Series; Clay – $350,000 – 32S/16D; Singles – Doubles	(South Africa) David Adams (United States) Jeff Tarango; 7–6^{(8–6)}, 6–4	(Sweden) Nicklas Kulti (Sweden) Mikael Tillström	(Norway) Christian Ruud (Sweden) Nicklas Kulti	(Spain) Galo Blanco (Argentina) Martín Rodríguez (Sweden) Magnus Norman (Spain) Germán Puentes
5 Jul	Rado Swiss Open Gstaad; Gstaad, Switzerland; ATP World Series; Clay – $525,000 – 32S/16D; Singles – Doubles	(Spain) Albert Costa; 7–6^{(7–4)}, 6–3, 6–4	(Ecuador) Nicolás Lapentti	(Morocco) Younes El Aynaoui (Spain) Félix Mantilla	(United States) Vince Spadea (Spain) Francisco Clavet (France) Arnaud Di Pasquale (Italy) Andrea Gaudenzi
5 Jul	Rado Swiss Open Gstaad; Gstaad, Switzerland; ATP World Series; Clay – $525,000 – 32S/16D; Singles – Doubles	(United States) Donald Johnson (Czech Republic) Cyril Suk; 7–5, 7–6^{(7–4)}	(North Macedonia) Aleksandar Kitinov (Philippines) Eric Taino	(Morocco) Younes El Aynaoui (Spain) Félix Mantilla	(United States) Vince Spadea (Spain) Francisco Clavet (France) Arnaud Di Pasquale (Italy) Andrea Gaudenzi
5 Jul	Miller Lite Hall of Fame Tennis Champs; Newport, United States; ATP World Series; Grass – $320,000 – 32S/16D; Singles – Doubles	(United States) Chris Woodruff; 6–7^{(5–7)}, 6–4, 6–4	(Denmark) Kenneth Carlsen	(Australia) Wayne Arthurs (Italy) Laurence Tieleman	(India) Leander Paes (Italy) Stefano Pescosolido (Australia) Andrew Ilie (Netherlands) Peter Wessels
5 Jul	Miller Lite Hall of Fame Tennis Champs; Newport, United States; ATP World Series; Grass – $320,000 – 32S/16D; Singles – Doubles	(Australia) Wayne Arthurs (India) Leander Paes; 6–7^{(6–8)}, 7–6^{(9–7)}, 6–3	(Armenia) Sargis Sargsian (United States) Chris Woodruff	(Australia) Wayne Arthurs (Italy) Laurence Tieleman	(India) Leander Paes (Italy) Stefano Pescosolido (Australia) Andrew Ilie (Netherlands) Peter Wessels
12 Jul	Davis Cup Quarterfinals; Moscow, Russia – clay (i); Chestnut Hill, United States – hard Pau, France – carpet (i); Brussels, Belgium – clay	Quarterfinals winners Russia 3–2; Australia 4–1; France 3–2; Belgium 3–2	Quarterfinals losers Slovakia; United States; Brazil; Switzerland		
19 Jul	Mercedes Cup; Stuttgart, Germany; ATP Championship Series; Clay – $1,040,000 – 48S/24D; Singles – Doubles	(Sweden) Magnus Norman; 6–7^{(6–8)}, 4–6, 7–6^{(9–7)}, 6–0, 6–3	(Germany) Tommy Haas	(Czech Republic) Jiří Novák (Spain) Àlex Corretja	(Ecuador) Nicolás Lapentti (Chile) Marcelo Ríos (United States) Vincent Spadea (Spain) Carlos Moyá
19 Jul	Mercedes Cup; Stuttgart, Germany; ATP Championship Series; Clay – $1,040,000 – 48S/24D; Singles – Doubles	(Brazil) Jaime Oncins (Argentina) Daniel Orsanic; 6–2, 6–1	(North Macedonia) Aleksandar Kitinov (United States) Jack Waite	(Czech Republic) Jiří Novák (Spain) Àlex Corretja	(Ecuador) Nicolás Lapentti (Chile) Marcelo Ríos (United States) Vincent Spadea (Spain) Carlos Moyá
26 Jul	Generali Open; Kitzbühel, Austria; ATP Championship Series; Clay – $525,000 – 48S/24D; Singles – Doubles	(Spain) Albert Costa; 7–5, 6–2, 6–7^{(5–7)}, 7–6^{(7–4)}	(Spain) Fernando Vicente	(Russia) Yevgeny Kafelnikov (Austria) Stefan Koubek	(Australia) Richard Fromberg (Spain) Juan Carlos Ferrero (Ecuador) Nicolás Lapentti (Brazil) Fernando Meligeni
26 Jul	Generali Open; Kitzbühel, Austria; ATP Championship Series; Clay – $525,000 – 48S/24D; Singles – Doubles	(South Africa) Chris Haggard (Sweden) Peter Nyborg; 6–3, 6–7^{(4–7)}, 7–6^{(7–4)}	(Spain) Álex Calatrava (Federal Republic of Yugoslavia) Dušan Vemić	(Russia) Yevgeny Kafelnikov (Austria) Stefan Koubek	(Australia) Richard Fromberg (Spain) Juan Carlos Ferrero (Ecuador) Nicolás Lapentti (Brazil) Fernando Meligeni
26 Jul	Mercedes-Benz Cup; Los Angeles, United States; ATP World Series; Hard – $350,000 – 32S/16D; Singles – Doubles	(United States) Pete Sampras; 7–6^{(7–3)}, 7–6^{(7–1)}	(United States) Andre Agassi	(Australia) Andrew Ilie (Australia) James Sekulov	(Australia) Lleyton Hewitt (France) Antony Dupuis (United States) Michael Chang (South Africa) Wayne Ferreira
26 Jul	Mercedes-Benz Cup; Los Angeles, United States; ATP World Series; Hard – $350,000 – 32S/16D; Singles – Doubles	(Zimbabwe) Byron Black (South Africa) Wayne Ferreira; 6–2, 7–6^{(7–4)}	(Croatia) Goran Ivanišević (United States) Brian MacPhie	(Australia) Andrew Ilie (Australia) James Sekulov	(Australia) Lleyton Hewitt (France) Antony Dupuis (United States) Michael Chang (South Africa) Wayne Ferreira
26 Jul	International Championship of Croatia; Umag, Croatia; ATP World Series; Clay – $375,000 – 32S/16D; Singles – Doubles	(Sweden) Magnus Norman; 6–2, 6–4	(United States) Jeff Tarango	(Croatia) Ivan Ljubičić (Spain) Albert Portas	(Spain) Carlos Moyá (Slovakia) Dominik Hrbatý (Spain) Francisco Clavet (Argentina) Agustín Calleri
26 Jul	International Championship of Croatia; Umag, Croatia; ATP World Series; Clay – $375,000 – 32S/16D; Singles – Doubles	(Argentina) Mariano Puerta (Spain) Javier Sánchez; 3–6, 6–2, 6–3	(Italy) Massimo Bertolini (Italy) Cristian Brandi	(Croatia) Ivan Ljubičić (Spain) Albert Portas	(Spain) Carlos Moyá (Slovakia) Dominik Hrbatý (Spain) Francisco Clavet (Argentina) Agustín Calleri

=== August ===
Week	Tournament	Champions	Runners-up	Semifinalists	Quarterfinalists
2 Aug	du Maurier Open; Montreal, Quebec, Canada; ATP Super 9 Hard – $2,200,000 – 56S/28D; Singles – Doubles	(Sweden) Thomas Johansson; 1–6, 6–3, 6–3	(Russia) Yevgeny Kafelnikov	(Germany) Nicolas Kiefer (United States) Andre Agassi	(Australia) Patrick Rafter (United States) Jim Courier (United States) Todd Martin (France) Fabrice Santoro
2 Aug	du Maurier Open; Montreal, Quebec, Canada; ATP Super 9 Hard – $2,200,000 – 56S/28D; Singles – Doubles	(Sweden) Jonas Björkman (Australia) Patrick Rafter; 7–6^{(7–5)}, 6–4	(Zimbabwe) Byron Black (South Africa) Wayne Ferreira	(Germany) Nicolas Kiefer (United States) Andre Agassi	(Australia) Patrick Rafter (United States) Jim Courier (United States) Todd Martin (France) Fabrice Santoro
2 Aug	Grolsch Open; Amsterdam, Netherlands; ATP World Series; Clay – $500,000 – 32S/16D; Singles – Doubles	(Morocco) Younes El Aynaoui; 6–0, 6–3	(Argentina) Mariano Zabaleta	(Russia) Marat Safin (Ecuador) Nicolás Lapentti	(France) Arnaud Di Pasquale (Brazil) Fernando Meligeni (Sweden) Magnus Gustafsson (Morocco) Hicham Arazi
2 Aug	Grolsch Open; Amsterdam, Netherlands; ATP World Series; Clay – $500,000 – 32S/16D; Singles – Doubles	(Netherlands) Paul Haarhuis (Netherlands) Sjeng Schalken; 6–3, 6–2	(United States) Devin Bowen (Israel) Eyal Ran	(Russia) Marat Safin (Ecuador) Nicolás Lapentti	(France) Arnaud Di Pasquale (Brazil) Fernando Meligeni (Sweden) Magnus Gustafsson (Morocco) Hicham Arazi
9 Aug	Great American Insurance ATP Champ; Mason, United States; ATP Super 9 Hard – $2,200,000 – 56S/28D; Singles – Doubles	(United States) Pete Sampras; 7–6^{(9–7)}, 6–3	(Australia) Patrick Rafter	(United States) Andre Agassi (Russia) Yevgeny Kafelnikov	(Netherlands) Richard Krajicek (Brazil) Gustavo Kuerten (United Kingdom) Tim Henman (United States) Michael Chang
9 Aug	Great American Insurance ATP Champ; Mason, United States; ATP Super 9 Hard – $2,200,000 – 56S/28D; Singles – Doubles	(Sweden) Jonas Björkman (Zimbabwe) Byron Black; 6–3, 7–6^{(8–6)}	(Australia) Todd Woodbridge (Australia) Mark Woodforde	(United States) Andre Agassi (Russia) Yevgeny Kafelnikov	(Netherlands) Richard Krajicek (Brazil) Gustavo Kuerten (United Kingdom) Tim Henman (United States) Michael Chang
9 Aug	Internazionali di Tennis di San Marino; City of San Marino, San Marino; ATP World Series; Clay – $300,000 – 32S/16D; Singles – Doubles	(Spain) Galo Blanco; 4–6, 6–4, 6–3	(Spain) Albert Portas	(Costa Rica) Juan Antonio Marín (Italy) Andrea Gaudenzi	(Austria) Stefan Koubek (Argentina) Hernán Gumy (Austria) Markus Hipfl (Spain) Julián Alonso
9 Aug	Internazionali di Tennis di San Marino; City of San Marino, San Marino; ATP World Series; Clay – $300,000 – 32S/16D; Singles – Doubles	(Argentina) Lucas Arnold Ker (Argentina) Mariano Hood; 6–3, 6–2	(Czech Republic) Petr Pála (Czech Republic) Pavel Vízner	(Costa Rica) Juan Antonio Marín (Italy) Andrea Gaudenzi	(Austria) Stefan Koubek (Argentina) Hernán Gumy (Austria) Markus Hipfl (Spain) Julián Alonso
16 Aug	RCA Championships; Indianapolis, United States; ATP Championship Series; Hard – $870,000 – 56S/28D; Singles – Doubles	(Ecuador) Nicolás Lapentti; 4–6, 6–4, 6–4	(United States) Vincent Spadea	(France) Sébastien Grosjean (Netherlands) Jan Siemerink	(United States) Pete Sampras (Brazil) Gustavo Kuerten (Spain) Carlos Moyá (Australia) Patrick Rafter
16 Aug	RCA Championships; Indianapolis, United States; ATP Championship Series; Hard – $870,000 – 56S/28D; Singles – Doubles	(Netherlands) Paul Haarhuis (United States) Jared Palmer; 6–3, 6–4	(France) Olivier Delaître (India) Leander Paes	(France) Sébastien Grosjean (Netherlands) Jan Siemerink	(United States) Pete Sampras (Brazil) Gustavo Kuerten (Spain) Carlos Moyá (Australia) Patrick Rafter
16 Aug	Legg Mason Tennis Classic; Washington, United States; ATP Championship Series; Hard – $725,000 – 56S/28D; Singles – Doubles	(United States) Andre Agassi; 7–6^{(7–3)}, 6–1	(Russia) Yevgeny Kafelnikov	(Germany) Nicolas Kiefer (United States) Todd Martin	(Czech Republic) Tomáš Zíb (Slovakia) Ján Krošlák (United States) Paul Goldstein (France) Fabrice Santoro
16 Aug	Legg Mason Tennis Classic; Washington, United States; ATP Championship Series; Hard – $725,000 – 56S/28D; Singles – Doubles	(United States) Justin Gimelstob (Canada) Sébastien Lareau; 7–5, 6–7^{(2–7)}, 6–3	(South Africa) David Adams (South Africa) John-Laffnie de Jager	(Germany) Nicolas Kiefer (United States) Todd Martin	(Czech Republic) Tomáš Zíb (Slovakia) Ján Krošlák (United States) Paul Goldstein (France) Fabrice Santoro
23 Aug	MFS Pro Tennis Championships; Boston, United States; ATP World Series; Hard – $325,000 – 32S/16D; Singles – Doubles	(Russia) Marat Safin; 6–4, 7–6^{(13–11)}	(United Kingdom) Greg Rusedski	(France) Arnaud Clément (Netherlands) Sjeng Schalken	(Sweden) Jonas Björkman (France) Sébastien Grosjean (Germany) David Prinosil (Chile) Marcelo Ríos
23 Aug	MFS Pro Tennis Championships; Boston, United States; ATP World Series; Hard – $325,000 – 32S/16D; Singles – Doubles	(Argentina) Guillermo Cañas (Argentina) Martín García; 5–7, 7–6^{(7–2)}, 6–3	(South Africa) Marius Barnard (United States) T. J. Middleton	(France) Arnaud Clément (Netherlands) Sjeng Schalken	(Sweden) Jonas Björkman (France) Sébastien Grosjean (Germany) David Prinosil (Chile) Marcelo Ríos
23 Aug	Waldbaum's Hamlet Cup; Long Island, United States; ATP World Series; Hard – $350,000 – 32S/16D; Singles – Doubles	(Sweden) Magnus Norman; 7–6^{(7–4)}, 4–6, 6–3	(Spain) Àlex Corretja	(Australia) Jason Stoltenberg (Czech Republic) Daniel Vacek	(Russia) Yevgeny Kafelnikov (Sweden) Thomas Johansson (Czech Republic) Bohdan Ulihrach (Sweden) Thomas Enqvist
23 Aug	Waldbaum's Hamlet Cup; Long Island, United States; ATP World Series; Hard – $350,000 – 32S/16D; Singles – Doubles	(France) Olivier Delaître (France) Fabrice Santoro; 7–5, 6–4	(United States) Jan-Michael Gambill (United States) Scott Humphries	(Australia) Jason Stoltenberg (Czech Republic) Daniel Vacek	(Russia) Yevgeny Kafelnikov (Sweden) Thomas Johansson (Czech Republic) Bohdan Ulihrach (Sweden) Thomas Enqvist
30 Aug; 6 Sep	US Open; New York City, United States; Grand Slam; Hard – $6,257,000; 128S/64D/32X; Singles – Doubles; Mixed doubles	(United States) Andre Agassi; 6–4, 6–7^{(5–7)}, 6–7^{(2–7)}, 6–3, 6–2	(United States) Todd Martin	(France) Cédric Pioline (Russia) Yevgeny Kafelnikov	(Czech Republic) Slava Doseděl (Brazil) Gustavo Kuerten (Netherlands) Richard Krajicek (France) Nicolas Escudé
30 Aug; 6 Sep	US Open; New York City, United States; Grand Slam; Hard – $6,257,000; 128S/64D/32X; Singles – Doubles; Mixed doubles	(Canada) Sébastien Lareau (United States) Alex O'Brien; 7–6^{(9–7)}, 6–4	(India) Mahesh Bhupathi (India) Leander Paes	(France) Cédric Pioline (Russia) Yevgeny Kafelnikov	(Czech Republic) Slava Doseděl (Brazil) Gustavo Kuerten (Netherlands) Richard Krajicek (France) Nicolas Escudé
30 Aug; 6 Sep	US Open; New York City, United States; Grand Slam; Hard – $6,257,000; 128S/64D/32X; Singles – Doubles; Mixed doubles	(India) Mahesh Bhupathi (Japan) Ai Sugiyama; 6–4, 6–4	(United States) Donald Johnson (United States) Kimberly Po	(France) Cédric Pioline (Russia) Yevgeny Kafelnikov	(Czech Republic) Slava Doseděl (Brazil) Gustavo Kuerten (Netherlands) Richard Krajicek (France) Nicolas Escudé

=== September ===
Week	Tournament	Champions	Runners-up	Semifinalists	Quarterfinalists
13 Sep	Samsung Open; Bournemouth, United Kingdom; ATP World Series; Clay – $400,000 – 32S/16D; Singles – Doubles	(Romania) Adrian Voinea; 1–6, 7–5, 7–6^{(7–2)}	(Austria) Stefan Koubek	(Sweden) Thomas Enqvist (Morocco) Younes El Aynaoui	(Morocco) Karim Alami (Sweden) Magnus Gustafsson (Germany) Hendrik Dreekmann (Germany) Marc-Kevin Goellner
13 Sep	Samsung Open; Bournemouth, United Kingdom; ATP World Series; Clay – $400,000 – 32S/16D; Singles – Doubles	(South Africa) David Adams (United States) Jeff Tarango; 6–3, 6–7^{(5–7)}, 7–6^{(7–5)}	(Germany) Michael Kohlmann (Sweden) Nicklas Kulti	(Sweden) Thomas Enqvist (Morocco) Younes El Aynaoui	(Morocco) Karim Alami (Sweden) Magnus Gustafsson (Germany) Hendrik Dreekmann (Germany) Marc-Kevin Goellner
13 Sep	Majorca Open; Mallorca, Spain; ATP World Series; Clay – $500,000 – 32S/16D; Singles – Doubles	(Spain) Juan Carlos Ferrero; 2–6, 7–5, 6–3	(Spain) Àlex Corretja	(Spain) Julián Alonso (Slovakia) Dominik Hrbatý	(Costa Rica) Juan Antonio Marín (Spain) Francisco Clavet (Austria) Markus Hipfl (Argentina) Hernán Gumy
13 Sep	Majorca Open; Mallorca, Spain; ATP World Series; Clay – $500,000 – 32S/16D; Singles – Doubles	(Argentina) Lucas Arnold Ker (Spain) Tomás Carbonell; 6–1, 6–4	(Spain) Alberto Berasategui (Spain) Francisco Roig	(Spain) Julián Alonso (Slovakia) Dominik Hrbatý	(Costa Rica) Juan Antonio Marín (Spain) Francisco Clavet (Austria) Markus Hipfl (Argentina) Hernán Gumy
13 Sep	President's Cup; Tashkent, Uzbekistan; ATP World Series; Hard – $500,000 – 32S/27Q/16D; Singles – Doubles	(Germany) Nicolas Kiefer; 6–4, 6–2	(Switzerland) George Bastl	(Czech Republic) Daniel Vacek (Netherlands) Peter Wessels	(Thailand) Paradorn Srichaphan (Philippines) Cecil Mamiit (Germany) Axel Pretzsch (France) Antony Dupuis
13 Sep	President's Cup; Tashkent, Uzbekistan; ATP World Series; Hard – $500,000 – 32S/27Q/16D; Singles – Doubles	(Uzbekistan) Oleg Ogorodov (Switzerland) Marc Rosset; 7–6^{(7–4)}, 7–6^{(7–1)}	(United States) Mark Keil (Switzerland) Lorenzo Manta	(Czech Republic) Daniel Vacek (Netherlands) Peter Wessels	(Thailand) Paradorn Srichaphan (Philippines) Cecil Mamiit (Germany) Axel Pretzsch (France) Antony Dupuis
20 Sep	Davis Cup Semifinals; Brisbane, Australia – grass Pau, France – carpet (i)	Semifinals winners Australia 4–1; France 4–1	Semifinals losers Russia; Belgium		
27 Sep	Grand Slam Cup; Munich, Germany; Grand Slam Cup (ITF); Hard (i) – $4,250,000 – 12S; Singles	(United Kingdom) Greg Rusedski; 6–3, 6–4, 6–7^{(5–7)}, 7–6^{(7–5)}	(Germany) Tommy Haas	(Sweden) Thomas Enqvist (Ukraine) Andrei Medvedev	(United States) Andre Agassi (Ecuador) Nicolás Lapentti (Netherlands) Richard Krajicek (Russia) Yevgeny Kafelnikov
27 Sep	Connex Open; Bucharest, Romania; ATP World Series; Clay – $350,000 – 32S/16D; Singles – Doubles	(Spain) Alberto Martín; 6–2, 6–3	(Morocco) Karim Alami	(Spain) Alberto Berasategui (Spain) Albert Costa	(Spain) Àlex Corretja (Costa Rica) Juan Antonio Marín (Armenia) Sargis Sargsian (Morocco) Younes El Aynaoui
27 Sep	Connex Open; Bucharest, Romania; ATP World Series; Clay – $350,000 – 32S/16D; Singles – Doubles	(Argentina) Lucas Arnold Ker (Argentina) Martín García; 6–3, 2–6, 6–3	(Germany) Marc-Kevin Goellner (United States) Francisco Montana	(Spain) Alberto Berasategui (Spain) Albert Costa	(Spain) Àlex Corretja (Costa Rica) Juan Antonio Marín (Armenia) Sargis Sargsian (Morocco) Younes El Aynaoui
27 Sep	Adidas Open de Toulouse; Toulouse, France; ATP World Series; Hard (i) – $400,000 – 32S/16D; Singles – Doubles	(France) Nicolas Escudé; 7–5, 6–1	(Czech Republic) Daniel Vacek	(Switzerland) Marc Rosset (Sweden) Thomas Johansson	(France) Fabrice Santoro (Sweden) Magnus Gustafsson (France) Antony Dupuis (United States) Jeff Tarango
27 Sep	Adidas Open de Toulouse; Toulouse, France; ATP World Series; Hard (i) – $400,000 – 32S/16D; Singles – Doubles	(France) Olivier Delaître (United States) Jeff Tarango; 3–6, 7–6^{(7–2)}, 6–4	(South Africa) David Adams (South Africa) John-Laffnie de Jager	(Switzerland) Marc Rosset (Sweden) Thomas Johansson	(France) Fabrice Santoro (Sweden) Magnus Gustafsson (France) Antony Dupuis (United States) Jeff Tarango

=== October ===
Week	Tournament	Champions	Runners-up	Semifinalists	Quarterfinalists
4 Oct	Davidoff Swiss Indoors; Basel, Switzerland; ATP World Series; Carpet (i) – $1,000,000 – 32S/16D; Singles – Doubles	(Slovakia) Karol Kučera; 6–4, 7–6^{(12–10)}, 4–6, 4–6, 7–6^{(7–2)}	(United Kingdom) Tim Henman	(Germany) Nicolas Kiefer (Croatia) Goran Ivanišević	(United States) Andre Agassi (United Kingdom) Greg Rusedski (Switzerland) Roger Federer (Russia) Yevgeny Kafelnikov
4 Oct	Davidoff Swiss Indoors; Basel, Switzerland; ATP World Series; Carpet (i) – $1,000,000 – 32S/16D; Singles – Doubles	(South Africa) Brent Haygarth (North Macedonia) Aleksandar Kitinov; 0–6, 6–4, 7–5	(Czech Republic) Jiří Novák (Czech Republic) David Rikl	(Germany) Nicolas Kiefer (Croatia) Goran Ivanišević	(United States) Andre Agassi (United Kingdom) Greg Rusedski (Switzerland) Roger Federer (Russia) Yevgeny Kafelnikov
4 Oct	Campionati Internazionali di Sicilia; Palermo, Italy; ATP World Series; Clay – $350,000 – 32S/16D; Singles – Doubles	(France) Arnaud Di Pasquale; 6–1, 6–3	(Spain) Alberto Berasategui	(Morocco) Karim Alami (Spain) Albert Costa	(Spain) Àlex Corretja (Austria) Markus Hipfl (Argentina) Hernán Gumy (Spain) Alberto Martín
4 Oct	Campionati Internazionali di Sicilia; Palermo, Italy; ATP World Series; Clay – $350,000 – 32S/16D; Singles – Doubles	(Argentina) Mariano Hood (Argentina) Sebastián Prieto; 6–3, 6–1	(South Africa) Lan Bale (Spain) Alberto Martín	(Morocco) Karim Alami (Spain) Albert Costa	(Spain) Àlex Corretja (Austria) Markus Hipfl (Argentina) Hernán Gumy (Spain) Alberto Martín
4 Oct	Heineken Open Shanghai; Shanghai, People's Republic of China; ATP World Series; Hard – $350,000 – 32S/16D; Singles – Doubles	(Sweden) Magnus Norman; 2–6, 6–3, 7–5	(Chile) Marcelo Ríos	(Sweden) Jonas Björkman (United States) Michael Chang	(Australia) Todd Woodbridge (Sweden) Andreas Vinciguerra (United States) Jan-Michael Gambill (Thailand) Paradorn Srichaphan
4 Oct	Heineken Open Shanghai; Shanghai, People's Republic of China; ATP World Series; Hard – $350,000 – 32S/16D; Singles – Doubles	(Canada) Sébastien Lareau (Canada) Daniel Nestor; 7–5, 6–3	(Australia) Todd Woodbridge (Australia) Mark Woodforde	(Sweden) Jonas Björkman (United States) Michael Chang	(Australia) Todd Woodbridge (Sweden) Andreas Vinciguerra (United States) Jan-Michael Gambill (Thailand) Paradorn Srichaphan
11 Oct	Heineken Open Singapore; Singapore City, Singapore; ATP Championship Series; Hard (i) – $725,000 – 32S/16D	(Chile) Marcelo Ríos; 6–2, 7–6^{(7–5)}	(Sweden) Mikael Tillström	(Australia) Lleyton Hewitt (Thailand) Paradorn Srichaphan	(United States) Jan-Michael Gambill (Netherlands) John van Lottum (Australia) Andrew Ilie (Croatia) Ivan Ljubičić
11 Oct	Heineken Open Singapore; Singapore City, Singapore; ATP Championship Series; Hard (i) – $725,000 – 32S/16D	(Belarus) Max Mirnyi (Philippines) Eric Taino; 6–3, 6–4	(Australia) Todd Woodbridge (Australia) Mark Woodforde	(Australia) Lleyton Hewitt (Thailand) Paradorn Srichaphan	(United States) Jan-Michael Gambill (Netherlands) John van Lottum (Australia) Andrew Ilie (Croatia) Ivan Ljubičić
11 Oct	CA-TennisTrophy; Vienna, Austria; ATP Championship Series; Carpet (i) – $800,000 – 32S/16D; Singles – Doubles	(United Kingdom) Greg Rusedski; 6–7^{(5–7)}, 2–6, 6–3, 7–5, 6–4	(Germany) Nicolas Kiefer	(Netherlands) Richard Krajicek (Switzerland) Roger Federer	(Russia) Yevgeny Kafelnikov (Austria) Stefan Koubek (France) Sébastien Grosjean (Slovakia) Karol Kučera
11 Oct	CA-TennisTrophy; Vienna, Austria; ATP Championship Series; Carpet (i) – $800,000 – 32S/16D; Singles – Doubles	(Germany) David Prinosil (Australia) Sandon Stolle; 6–3, 6–4	(South Africa) Piet Norval (Zimbabwe) Kevin Ullyett	(Netherlands) Richard Krajicek (Switzerland) Roger Federer	(Russia) Yevgeny Kafelnikov (Austria) Stefan Koubek (France) Sébastien Grosjean (Slovakia) Karol Kučera
18 Oct	Grand Prix de Tennis de Lyon; Lyon, France; ATP World Series; Carpet (i) – $750,000 – 48S/19Q/16D; Singles – Doubles	(Ecuador) Nicolás Lapentti; 6–3, 6–2	(Australia) Lleyton Hewitt	(United States) Vincent Spadea (Sweden) Magnus Gustafsson	(Russia) Yevgeny Kafelnikov (Sweden) Mikael Tillström (Brazil) Gustavo Kuerten (United States) Jeff Tarango
18 Oct	Grand Prix de Tennis de Lyon; Lyon, France; ATP World Series; Carpet (i) – $750,000 – 48S/19Q/16D; Singles – Doubles	(South Africa) Piet Norval (Zimbabwe) Kevin Ullyett; 4–6, 7–6^{(7–5)}, 7–6^{(7–4)}	(South Africa) Wayne Ferreira (Australia) Sandon Stolle	(United States) Vincent Spadea (Sweden) Magnus Gustafsson	(Russia) Yevgeny Kafelnikov (Sweden) Mikael Tillström (Brazil) Gustavo Kuerten (United States) Jeff Tarango
25 Oct	Eurocard Open; Stuttgart, Germany; ATP Super 9 Hard (i) – $2,200,000 – 48S/24Q/24D; Singles – Doubles	(Sweden) Thomas Enqvist; 6–1, 6–4, 5–7, 7–5	(Netherlands) Richard Krajicek	(United States) Andre Agassi (United Kingdom) Greg Rusedski	(Romania) Andrei Pavel (Chile) Marcelo Ríos (United States) Todd Martin (Argentina) Mariano Zabaleta
25 Oct	Eurocard Open; Stuttgart, Germany; ATP Super 9 Hard (i) – $2,200,000 – 48S/24Q/24D; Singles – Doubles	(Sweden) Jonas Björkman (Zimbabwe) Byron Black; 6–7^{(6–8)}, 7–6^{(7–2)}, 6–0	(South Africa) David Adams (South Africa) John-Laffnie de Jager	(United States) Andre Agassi (United Kingdom) Greg Rusedski	(Romania) Andrei Pavel (Chile) Marcelo Ríos (United States) Todd Martin (Argentina) Mariano Zabaleta

=== November ===
Week	Tournament	Champions	Runners-up	Semifinalists	Quarterfinalists
1 Nov	Paris Open; Paris, France; ATP Super 9 Carpet (i) – $2,300,000 – 48S/24Q/24D; Singles – Doubles	(United States) Andre Agassi; 7–6^{(7–1)}, 6–2, 4–6, 6–4	(Russia) Marat Safin	(Ecuador) Nicolás Lapentti (United States) Michael Chang	(Australia) Mark Philippoussis (Germany) Tommy Haas (United States) Jim Courier (France) Cédric Pioline
1 Nov	Paris Open; Paris, France; ATP Super 9 Carpet (i) – $2,300,000 – 48S/24Q/24D; Singles – Doubles	(Canada) Sébastien Lareau (United States) Alex O'Brien; 7–6^{(9–7)}, 7–5	(Netherlands) Paul Haarhuis (United States) Jared Palmer	(Ecuador) Nicolás Lapentti (United States) Michael Chang	(Australia) Mark Philippoussis (Germany) Tommy Haas (United States) Jim Courier (France) Cédric Pioline
8 Nov	Kremlin Cup; Moscow, Russia; ATP World Series; Carpet (i) – $1,000,000 – 32S/16D; Singles – Doubles	(Russia) Yevgeny Kafelnikov; 7–6^{(7–2)}, 6–4	(Zimbabwe) Byron Black	(France) Nicolas Escudé (United States) Jeff Tarango	(Czech Republic) Daniel Vacek (Ukraine) Andrei Medvedev (France) Fabrice Santoro (Switzerland) Marc Rosset
8 Nov	Kremlin Cup; Moscow, Russia; ATP World Series; Carpet (i) – $1,000,000 – 32S/16D; Singles – Doubles	(United States) Justin Gimelstob (Czech Republic) Daniel Vacek; 6–2, 6–1	(Ukraine) Andrei Medvedev (Russia) Marat Safin	(France) Nicolas Escudé (United States) Jeff Tarango	(Czech Republic) Daniel Vacek (Ukraine) Andrei Medvedev (France) Fabrice Santoro (Switzerland) Marc Rosset
8 Nov	Scania Stockholm Open; Stockholm, Sweden; ATP World Series; Hard (i) – $825,000 – 32S/16D; Singles – Doubles	(Sweden) Thomas Enqvist; 6–3, 6–4, 6–2	(Sweden) Magnus Gustafsson	(Sweden) Magnus Norman (United States) Jan-Michael Gambill	(Sweden) Andreas Vinciguerra (Ecuador) Nicolás Lapentti (Sweden) Jonas Björkman (Australia) Mark Philippoussis
8 Nov	Scania Stockholm Open; Stockholm, Sweden; ATP World Series; Hard (i) – $825,000 – 32S/16D; Singles – Doubles	(South Africa) Piet Norval (Zimbabwe) Kevin Ullyett; 7–5, 6–3	(United States) Jan-Michael Gambill (United States) Scott Humphries	(Sweden) Magnus Norman (United States) Jan-Michael Gambill	(Sweden) Andreas Vinciguerra (Ecuador) Nicolás Lapentti (Sweden) Jonas Björkman (Australia) Mark Philippoussis
15 Nov	ATP Tour World Doubles Championship; Hartford, United States; ATP Tour World Championships; Carpet (i) – $900,000 – 8D (RR); Doubles	(Canada) Sébastien Lareau (United States) Alex O'Brien; 6–3, 6–2, 6–2	(India) Mahesh Bhupathi (India) Leander Paes		
22 Nov	ATP Tour World Championship; Hanover, Germany; ATP Tour World Championships; Hard (i) – $3,600,000 – 8S (RR); Singles	(United States) Pete Sampras; 6–1, 7–5, 6–4	(United States) Andre Agassi	(Russia) Yevgeny Kafelnikov (Germany) Nicolas Kiefer	Round Robin (Brazil) Gustavo Kuerten (Ecuador) Nicolás Lapentti (Sweden) Thomas Enqvist (United States) Todd Martin
29 Nov	Davis Cup Final; Nice, France – clay (i)	Australia 3–2	France		

== Statistical information ==
These tables present the number of singles (S), doubles (D), and mixed doubles (X) titles won by each player and each nation during the season, within all the tournament categories of the 1999 ATP Tour: the Grand Slam tournaments, the ATP Tour World Championships and the Grand Slam Cup, the ATP Super 9, the ATP Championship Series, and the ATP World Series. The players/nations are sorted by: 1) total number of titles (a doubles title won by two players representing the same nation counts as only one win for the nation); 2) cumulated importance of those titles (one Grand Slam win equalling two Super 9 wins, one year-end championships win equalling one-and-a-half Super 9 win, one Super 9 win equalling two International Series Gold wins, one International Series Gold win equalling two International Series wins); 3) a singles > doubles > mixed doubles hierarchy; 4) alphabetical order (by family names for players).

Key

Grand Slam tournaments
Year-end championships
ATP Super 9
ATP Championship Series
ATP World Series
All titles

=== Titles won by player ===
Total	Player	Grand Slam			Year-end		Super 9		Championship Series		World Series		Total		
Total	Player	S	D	X	S	D	S	D	S	D	S	D	S	D	X
7	Sébastien Lareau (CAN)		1			1		1		1		3	0	7	0
6	Jeff Tarango (USA)									1		5	0	6	0
5	Leander Paes (IND)		2	1								2	0	4	1
5	Pete Sampras (USA)	1			1		1				2		5	0	0
5	Andre Agassi (USA)	2					1		1		1		5	0	0
5	Jonas Björkman (SWE)		1					3				1	0	5	0
5	Alex O'Brien (USA)		1			1		1				2	0	5	0
5	Magnus Norman (SWE)								1		4		5	0	0
5	Justin Gimelstob (USA)									1		4	0	5	0
4	Mahesh Bhupathi (IND)		2	1								1	0	3	1
4	Patrick Rafter (AUS)		1					1			1	1	1	3	0
4	Yevgeny Kafelnikov (RUS)	1							1	1	1		3	1	0
4	David Adams (RSA)			1						1		2	0	3	1
4	Sandon Stolle (AUS)							2		1		1	0	4	0
4	Byron Black (ZIM)							2			1	1	1	3	0
4	Max Mirnyi (BLR)									1		3	0	4	0
4	Daniel Vacek (CZE)									1		3	0	4	0
4	Lucas Arnold Ker (ARG)											4	0	4	0
3	Piet Norval (RSA)			1								2	0	2	1
3	Greg Rusedski (GBR)				1				1	1			2	1	0
3	Gustavo Kuerten (BRA)						2					1	2	1	0
3	Wayne Black (ZIM)							2				1	0	3	0
3	Marcelo Ríos (CHI)						1		1		1		3	0	0
3	Thomas Enqvist (SWE)						1				2		3	0	0
3	Olivier Delaître (FRA)							1				2	0	3	0
3	Paul Haarhuis (NED)									2		1	0	3	0
3	Albert Costa (ESP)								1		2		3	0	0
3	Nicolas Kiefer (GER)								1		2		3	0	0
3	Nicolás Lapentti (ECU)								1		1	1	2	1	0
3	Jaime Oncins (BRA)									1		2	0	3	0
3	Todd Woodbridge (AUS)									1		2	0	3	0
3	Andrei Olhovskiy (RUS)											3	0	3	0
2	Richard Krajicek (NED)						1		1				2	0	0
2	Tim Henman (GBR)							1		1			0	2	0
2	Mark Philippoussis (AUS)						1				1		2	0	0
2	Wayne Arthurs (AUS)							1				1	0	2	0
2	Daniel Orsanic (ARG)									1		1	0	2	0
2	Jared Palmer (USA)									1		1	0	2	0
2	Mark Woodforde (AUS)									1		1	0	2	0
2	Alberto Martín (ESP)										2		2	0	0
2	Marc Rosset (SUI)										1	1	1	1	0
2	Fabrice Santoro (FRA)										1	1	1	1	0
2	Sjeng Schalken (NED)										1	1	1	1	0
2	Tomás Carbonell (ESP)											2	0	2	0
2	Patrick Galbraith (USA)											2	0	2	0
2	Martín García (ARG)											2	0	2	0
2	Mariano Hood (ARG)											2	0	2	0
2	Donald Johnson (USA)											2	0	2	0
2	Daniel Nestor (CAN)											2	0	2	0
2	Mariano Puerta (ARG)											2	0	2	0
2	Kevin Ullyett (ZIM)											2	0	2	0
1	Thomas Johansson (SWE)						1						1	0	0
1	Ellis Ferreira (RSA)							1					0	1	0
1	Andrew Kratzmann (AUS)							1					0	1	0
1	Rick Leach (USA)							1					0	1	0
1	Tommy Haas (GER)								1				1	0	0
1	Félix Mantilla (ESP)								1				1	0	0
1	John-Laffnie de Jager (RSA)									1			0	1	0
1	Chris Haggard (RSA)									1			0	1	0
1	Peter Nyborg (SWE)									1			0	1	0
1	David Prinosil (GER)									1			0	1	0
1	Eric Taino (PHI)									1			0	1	0
1	Galo Blanco (ESP)										1		1	0	0
1	Arnaud di Pasquale (FRA)										1		1	0	0
1	Younes El Aynaoui (MAR)										1		1	0	0
1	Nicolas Escudé (FRA)										1		1	0	0
1	Juan Carlos Ferrero (ESP)										1		1	0	0
1	Jan-Michael Gambill (USA)										1		1	0	0
1	Jérôme Golmard (FRA)										1		1	0	0
1	Magnus Gustafsson (SWE)										1		1	0	0
1	Lleyton Hewitt (AUS)										1		1	0	0
1	Dominik Hrbatý (SVK)										1		1	0	0
1	Stefan Koubek (AUT)										1		1	0	0
1	Karol Kučera (SVK)										1		1	0	0
1	Juan Antonio Marín (CRC)										1		1	0	0
1	Todd Martin (USA)										1		1	0	0
1	Cédric Pioline (FRA)										1		1	0	0
1	Marat Safin (RUS)										1		1	0	0
1	Rainer Schüttler (GER)										1		1	0	0
1	Franco Squillari (ARG)										1		1	0	0
1	Fernando Vicente (ESP)										1		1	0	0
1	Adrian Voinea (ROU)										1		1	0	0
1	Chris Woodruff (USA)										1		1	0	0
1	Guillermo Cañas (ARG)											1	0	1	0
1	Jim Courier (USA)											1	0	1	0
1	Martin Damm (CZE)											1	0	1	0
1	Wayne Ferreira (RSA)											1	0	1	0
1	Andrew Florent (AUS)											1	0	1	0
1	James Greenhalgh (NZL)											1	0	1	0
1	Brent Haygarth (RSA)											1	0	1	0
1	Aleksandar Kitinov (MKD)											1	0	1	0
1	Fernando Meligeni (BRA)											1	0	1	0
1	Oleg Ogorodov (UZB)											1	0	1	0
1	Sebastián Prieto (ARG)											1	0	1	0
1	Richey Reneberg (USA)											1	0	1	0
1	Javier Sánchez (ESP)											1	0	1	0
1	Grant Silcock (AUS)											1	0	1	0
1	Radek Štěpánek (CZE)											1	0	1	0
1	Cyril Suk (CZE)											1	0	1	0
1	Nenad Zimonjić (YUG)											1	0	1	0

=== Titles won by nation ===
Total	Nation	Grand Slam			Year-end		Super 9		Championship Series		World Series		Total		
Total	Nation	S	D	X	S	D	S	D	S	D	S	D	S	D	X
34	United States (USA)	3	1		1	1	2	2	1	3	6	14	13	21	0
18	Australia (AUS)		1				1	4		2	3	7	4	14	0
16	Sweden (SWE)		1				2	3	1	1	7	1	10	6	0
12	Spain (ESP)								2		7	3	9	3	0
11	South Africa (RSA)			2				1		2		6	0	9	2
10	Argentina (ARG)									1	1	8	1	9	0
9	Zimbabwe (ZIM)							4			1	4	1	8	0
8	Russia (RUS)	1							1	1	2	3	4	4	0
8	France (FRA)							1			5	2	5	3	0
7	Canada (CAN)		1			1		1		1		3	0	7	0
6	India (IND)		2	2								2	0	4	2
6	Brazil (BRA)						2			1		3	2	4	0
6	Netherlands (NED)						1		1	2	1	1	3	3	0
6	Germany (GER)								2	1	3		5	1	0
6	Czech Republic (CZE)									1		5	0	6	0
4	Great Britain (GBR)				1			1	1	1			2	2	0
4	Belarus (BLR)									1		3	0	4	0
3	Chile (CHI)						1		1		1		3	0	0
3	Ecuador (ECU)								1		1	1	2	1	0
2	Slovakia (SVK)										2		2	0	0
2	Switzerland (SUI)										1	1	1	1	0
1	Philippines (PHI)									1			0	1	0
1	Austria (AUT)										1		1	0	0
1	Costa Rica (CRC)										1		1	0	0
1	Morocco (MAR)										1		1	0	0
1	Romania (ROU)										1		1	0	0
1	North Macedonia (MKD)											1	0	1	0
1	New Zealand (NZL)											1	0	1	0
1	Uzbekistan (UZB)											1	0	1	0
1	FR Yugoslavia (YUG)											1	0	1	0

== ATP rankings ==
These are the ATP rankings of the top twenty singles players, doubles players, and the top ten doubles teams on the ATP Tour, at the end of the 1998 ATP Tour, and of the 1999 season, with number of rankings points, number of tournaments played, year-end ranking in 1998, highest and lowest position during the season (for singles and doubles individual only, as doubles team rankings are not calculated over a rolling year-to-date system), and number of spots gained or lost from the 1998 to the 1999 year-end rankings.

=== Singles ===
as of 28 December 1998
#	Player	Points
1	Pete Sampras (USA)	3915
2	Marcelo Ríos (CHI)	3670
3	Àlex Corretja (ESP)	3398
4	Patrick Rafter (AUS)	3315
5	Carlos Moyá (ESP)	3159
6	Andre Agassi (USA)	2879
7	Tim Henman (GBR)	2620
8	Karol Kučera (SVK)	2579
9	Greg Rusedski (GBR)	2573
10	Richard Krajicek (NED)	2548
11	Yevgeny Kafelnikov (RUS)	2515
12	Goran Ivanišević (CRO)	2137
13	Petr Korda (CZE)	2114
14	Albert Costa (ESP)	1823
15	Mark Philippoussis (AUS)	1792
16	Todd Martin (USA)	1774
17	Thomas Johansson (SWE)	1761
18	Cédric Pioline (FRA)	1710
19	Jan Siemerink (NED)	1669
20	Félix Mantilla (ESP)	1643

Year-end rankings 1999 (27 December 1999)
#	Player	Points	#Trn	'98 Rk	High	Low	'98→'99
1	Andre Agassi (USA)	5048	17	6	1	14	▲5
2	Yevgeny Kafelnikov (RUS)	3465	30	11	1	11	▲9
3	Pete Sampras (USA)	3024	13	1	1	5	▼2
4	Thomas Enqvist (SWE)	2606	26	22	4	22	▲18
5	Gustavo Kuerten (BRA)	2601	24	23	3	23	▲18
6	Nicolas Kiefer (GER)	2447	23	35	5	39	▲29
7	Todd Martin (USA)	2408	17	16	4	16	▲9
8	Nicolás Lapentti (ECU)	2284	23	90	6	91	▲82
9	Marcelo Ríos (CHI)	2245	19	2	2	13	▼7
10	Richard Krajicek (NED)	2095	21	10	4	13	=
11	Tommy Haas (GER)	1921	23	34	10	35	▲23
12	Tim Henman (GBR)	1920	25	7	5	12	▼5
13	Cédric Pioline (FRA)	1814	29	18	13	59	▲5
14	Greg Rusedski (GBR)	1802	23	9	6	14	▼5
15	Magnus Norman (SWE)	1748	27	52	15	64	▲37
16	Patrick Rafter (AUS)	1731	17	4	1	17	▼12
17	Karol Kučera (SVK)	1633	21	8	8	20	▼9
18	Albert Costa (ESP)	1572	25	14	13	28	▼4
19	Mark Philippoussis (AUS)	1570	17	15	8	23	▼4
20	Vincent Spadea (USA)	1542	26	42	19	46	▲22

=== Doubles (individual) ===
as of 28 December 1998
#	Player	Points
1	Jacco Eltingh (NED)	5143
2	Paul Haarhuis (NED)	4270
3	Mahesh Bhupathi (IND)	3816
4	Leander Paes (IND)	3781
5	Todd Woodbridge (AUS)	3398
6	Mark Woodforde (AUS)	3398
7	Daniel Nestor (CAN)	3260
8	Jonas Björkman (SWE)	3202
9	Mark Knowles (BAH)	2967
10	Ellis Ferreira (RSA)	2835
11	Cyril Suk (CZE)	2450
12	Olivier Delaître (FRA)	2425
13	Rick Leach (USA)	2392
14	Sandon Stolle (AUS)	2309
15	Jim Grabb (USA)	2243
16	Patrick Rafter (AUS)	2179
17	Sébastien Lareau (CAN)	2150
18	Fabrice Santoro (FRA)	2136
19	Yevgeny Kafelnikov (RUS)	2123
20	Alex O'Brien (USA)	2029

Year-end rankings 1999 (27 December 1999)
#	Player	Points	#Trn	'98 Rk	High	Low	'98→'99
1	Leander Paes (IND)	4339	19	4	1	4	▲3
2	Mahesh Bhupathi (IND)	3851	22	3	1	3	▲1
3	Jonas Björkman (SWE)	3623	19	8	3	14	▲5
4	Sébastien Lareau (CAN)	3137	23	17	4	26	▲13
5	Paul Haarhuis (NED)	2990	19	2	1	6	▼3
6	Jared Palmer (USA)	2889	21	86	6	86	▲80
7	Alex O'Brien (USA)	2756	18	20	7	32	▲13
8	Todd Woodbridge (AUS)	2716	21	5	5	15	▼3
9	Sandon Stolle (AUS)	2705	26	14	3	17	▲5
10	Byron Black (ZIM)	2619	19	70	10	86	▲60
11	Mark Woodforde (AUS)	2619	21	6	5T	18	▼5
12	David Adams (RSA)	2549	35	37	10	37	▲25
13	Ellis Ferreira (RSA)	2542	23	10	8	15	▼3
14	Wayne Black (ZIM)	2400	21	46	12	52	▲32
15	Rick Leach (USA)	2395	21	13	9	22	▼2
16	Olivier Delaître (FRA)	2352	25	12	3	18	▼4
17	Jeff Tarango (USA)	2318	29	52	10	53	▲35
18	John-Laffnie de Jager (RSA)	2249	29	33	12	37	▲15
19	Patrick Rafter (AUS)	2214	10	16	6	19	▼3
20	Daniel Vacek (CZE)	2034	29	26	10	26	▲6

=== Doubles (team) ===
as of 28 December 1998
#	Player	Points
1	Jacco Eltingh (NED); Paul Haarhuis (NED)	4684
2	Mahesh Bhupathi (IND); Leander Paes (IND)	3922
3	Mark Woodforde (AUS); Todd Woodbridge (AUS)	3667
4	Mark Knowles (BAH); Daniel Nestor (CAN)	3055
5	Ellis Ferreira (RSA); Rick Leach (USA)	2490
6	Donald Johnson (USA); Francisco Montana (USA)	2141
7	Cyril Suk (CZE); Sandon Stolle (AUS)	2127
8	Olivier Delaître (FRA); Fabrice Santoro (FRA)	2116
9	Jonas Björkman (SWE); Patrick Rafter (AUS)	1932
10	Yevgeny Kafelnikov (RUS); Daniel Vacek (CZE)	1866

Year-end rankings 1999 (27 December 1999)
#	Player	Points	#Trn	'98 Rk	'98→'99
1	Mahesh Bhupathi (IND); Leander Paes (IND)	4019	15	2	▲1
2	Sébastien Lareau (CAN); Alex O'Brien (USA)	3007	14	22	▲20
3	Mark Woodforde (AUS); Todd Woodbridge (AUS)	2837	19	3	=
4	Ellis Ferreira (RSA); Rick Leach (USA)	2439	21	5	▲1
5	Wayne Black (ZIM); Sandon Stolle (AUS)	2275	19	—	▲ new
6	David Adams (RSA); John-Laffnie de Jager (RSA)	2249	29	75	▲69
7	Jonas Björkman (AUS); Patrick Rafter (AUS)	2097	7	9	▲2
8	Paul Haarhuis (NED); Jared Palmer (USA)	2072	10	—	▲ new
9	Piet Norval (RSA); Kevin Ullyett (ZIM)	1833	28	53	▲44
10	Jiří Novák (CZE); David Rikl (CZE)	1636	28	15	▲5

== See also ==
- 1999 WTA Tour
- Association of Tennis Professionals
- International Tennis Federation
