= 1999 Merano Open – Doubles =

Doubles
- 1999 Merano Open

Final
- Champions: (Argentina) Lucas Arnold Ker (Brazil) Jaime Oncins
- Runners-up: (Germany) Marc-Kevin Goellner (Philippines) Eric Taino
- Score: 6–4, 7–6^{(7–1)}

Details
- Draw: 16 (1 Q / 3 WC )
- Seeds: 4

Events
Singles	Doubles
Merano Open

Lucas Arnold Ker and Jaime Oncins win the title by defeating Marc-Kevin Goellner and Eric Taino 6–4, 7–6^{(7–1)} in the final.

== Seeds ==
1. (Italy) Massimo Bertolini / (Italy) Cristian Brandi (Quarterfinal)
2. (Argentina) Pablo Albano / (Spain) Tomás Carbonell (first round)
3. (Argentina) Lucas Arnold Ker / (Brazil) Jaime Oncins (champions)
4. (Spain) Alberto Martín / (South Africa) Paul Rosner (first round)

== Draw ==
=== Key ===
- Q = Qualifier
- WC = Wild card
- LL = Lucky loser
- Alt = Alternate
- ITF = ITF entry
- PR = Protected ranking
- SR = Special ranking
- SE = Special exempt
- JE = Junior exempt
- JR = Junior Accelerator Programme entrant
- CO = College Accelerator Programme entrant
- NG = Next Gen Accelerator Program entrant
- w/o = Walkover
- r = Retired
- d = Defaulted

=== Draw ===
First round
1	(Italy) M Bertolini (Italy) C Brandi	6	6
(United States) D Bowen (Brazil) C Testa	0	2
WC	(Italy) O Camporese (Italy) D Sanguinetti	4	3
WC	(Morocco) K Alami (Morocco) H Arazi	6	6
3	(Argentina) L Arnold Ker (Brazil) J Oncins	6	6
(Italy) M Ardinghi (Italy) V Santopadre	3	4
Q	(Spain) S Navarro (Spain) A Portas	6	3
(Slovakia) D Hrbatý (Belgium) T Vanhoudt	7	6
(Italy) G Galimberti (Italy) M Valeri	6	7
(Spain) JI Carrasco (Spain) J Velasco Jr.	4	6
(Argentina) D del Río (Argentina) M Rodríguez	6	6
4	(Spain) A Martín (South Africa) P Rosner	4	2
WC	(Italy) F Allgauer (Italy) F Volandri	4	0
(Spain) A Berasategui (Spain) F Roig	6	6
(Germany) M-K Goellner (Philippines) E Taino	7	3	6
2	(Argentina) P Albano (Spain) T Carbonell	5	6	2

Quarterfinals
1	(Italy) M Bertolini (Italy) C Brandi	2	4
WC	(Morocco) K Alami (Morocco) H Arazi	6	6
3	(Argentina) L Arnold Ker (Brazil) J Oncins	4	6	6
(Slovakia) D Hrbatý (Belgium) T Vanhoudt	6	0	2
(Italy) G Galimberti (Italy) M Valeri	6	3	3
(Argentina) D del Río (Argentina) M Rodríguez	4	6	6
(Spain) A Berasategui (Spain) F Roig	1	2
(Germany) M-K Goellner (Philippines) E Taino	6	6

Semifinals
WC	(Morocco) K Alami (Morocco) H Arazi	6	5	3
3	(Argentina) L Arnold Ker (Brazil) J Oncins	4	7	6
(Argentina) D del Río (Argentina) M Rodríguez	3	7	2
(Germany) M-K Goellner (Philippines) E Taino	6	5	6

Final
3	(Argentina) L Arnold Ker (Brazil) J Oncins	6	7
(Germany) M-K Goellner (Philippines) E Taino	4	6
