= 1999 Merano Open – Singles =

Singles
- 1999 Merano Open

Final
- Champion: (Spain) Fernando Vicente
- Runner-up: (Morocco) Hicham Arazi
- Score: 6–2, 3–6, 7–6^{(7–1)}

Details
- Draw: 32 (4 Q / 3 WC )
- Seeds: 8

Events
Singles	Doubles
Merano Open

Fernando Vicente defeated Hicham Arazi 6–2, 3–6, 7–6^{(7–1)} in the final to secure the title.

== Seeds ==
The text in italics indicates the round in which that seed exited the tournament.

1. (Slovakia) Dominik Hrbatý (semifinals)
2. (Morocco) Younes El Aynaoui (first round)
3. (Morocco) Hicham Arazi (final)
4. (Argentina) Mariano Puerta (first round)
5. (Morocco) Karim Alami (first round)
6. (Norway) Christian Ruud (second round)
7. (Paraguay) Ramón Delgado (first round)
8. (France) Arnaud Di Pasquale (first round)

== Draw ==
=== Key ===
- Q = Qualifier
- WC = Wild card
- LL = Lucky loser
- Alt = Alternate
- SE = Special exempt
- PR = Protected ranking
- ITF = ITF entry
- JE = Junior exempt
- w/o = Walkover
- r = Retired
- d = Defaulted
- SR = Special ranking

=== Finals ===
Semifinals					Finals
1	(Slovakia) Dominik Hrbatý	4	6^{3}
3	(Morocco) Hicham Arazi	6	7^{7}		3	(Morocco) Hicham Arazi	2	6	6^{1}
WC	(Italy) Andrea Gaudenzi	5	6	4		(Spain) Fernando Vicente	6	3	7^{7}
	(Spain) Fernando Vicente	7	3	6

=== Section 1 ===
First round
1	(Slovakia) D Hrbatý	6	6
(Spain) A Berasategui	1	2
(Italy) D Sanguinetti	3	7^{7}	4
(Austria) S Koubek	6	6^{5}	6
WC	(Italy) F Allgauer	4	3
(Spain) G Blanco	6	6
WC	(Italy) R Furlan	1	7^{7}	7
8	(France) A Di Pasquale	6	6^{5}	5
3	(Morocco) H Arazi	6	6
(Spain) A Portas	1	1
(Romania) A Voinea	7	6^{2}	6
Q	(Argentina) L Ker	5	7^{7}	4
Q	(Spain) S Navarro	2	7^{7}	6
(Costa Rica) J Marín	6	6^{2}	3
(Argentina) G Cañas	7^{7}	7^{7}
5	(Morocco) K Alami	6^{3}	6^{5}

Second round
1	(Slovakia) D Hrbatý	6	6
(Austria) S Koubek	2	3
(Spain) G Blanco	6	6
WC	(Italy) R Furlan	3	0
3	(Morocco) H Arazi	6^{5}	6	6
(Romania) A Voinea	7^{7}	1	4
Q	(Spain) S Navarro	1	1
(Argentina) G Cañas	6	6

Quarterfinals
1	(Slovakia) D Hrbatý	6	2	6
(Spain) G Blanco	4	6	3
3	(Morocco) H Arazi	6	6
(Argentina) G Cañas	1	1

Semifinals
1	(Slovakia) D Hrbatý	4	6^{3}
3	(Morocco) H Arazi	6	7^{7}

=== Section 2 ===
First round
6	(Norway) C Ruud	6	3	6
(Argentina) G Gaudio	3	6	1
WC	(Italy) A Gaudenzi	6	6
(Argentina) H Gumy	1	3
(Argentina) E Medica	7^{7}	4	3
Q	(Austria) M Spöttl	6^{5}	6	6
(Austria) M Hipfl	6	6
4	(Argentina) M Puerta	3	0
7	(Paraguay) R Delgado	2	2
(Romania) D Pescariu	6	6
(Spain) F Vicente	6	2	6
(Italy) V Santopadre	3	6	2
(Spain) A Martín	6	6
Q	(Italy) M Martelli	3	4
(Argentina) M Rodríguez	7	2
2	(Morocco) Y El Aynaoui	5	0	R

Second round
6	(Norway) C Ruud	6	6^{5}	5
WC	(Italy) A Gaudenzi	3	7^{7}	7
Q	(Austria) M Spöttl	6	6
(Austria) M Hipfl	4	3
(Romania) D Pescariu	3	0
(Spain) F Vicente	6	6
(Spain) A Martín	5	6	4
(Argentina) M Rodríguez	7	3	6

Quarterfinals
WC	(Italy) A Gaudenzi	6	3	7
Q	(Austria) M Spöttl	3	6	5
(Spain) F Vicente	4	6	6
(Argentina) M Rodríguez	6	4	3

Semifinals
WC	(Italy) A Gaudenzi	5	6	4
(Spain) F Vicente	7	3	6
