= 1999 Mercedes Cup =

Tennis tournament

- Date: 19–25 July
- Edition: 51st
- Category: Championship Series
- Draw: 48S / 24D
- Prize money: $915,000
- Surface: Clay / outdoor
- Location: Stuttgart, Germany
- Venue: Tennis Club Weissenhof

Champions

Singles
- (Sweden) Magnus Norman

Doubles
- (Brazil) Jaime Oncins / (Argentina) Daniel Orsanic
- Stuttgart Open

The 1999 Mercedes Cup was a men's tennis tournament played on outdoor clay courts at the Tennis Club Weissenhof in Stuttgart, Germany and was part of the Championship Series of the 1999 ATP Tour. The tournament was held from 19 July until 25 July 1999. Unseeded Magnus Norman won the singles title.

== Finals ==
=== Singles ===
(Sweden) Magnus Norman defeated (Germany) Tommy Haas 6–7^{(6–8)}, 4–6, 7–6^{(9–7)}, 6–0, 6–3

- It was Norman's 2nd singles title of the year and the 4th of his career.

=== Doubles ===
(Brazil) Jaime Oncins / (Argentina) Daniel Orsanic defeated (North Macedonia) Aleksandar Kitinov / (United States) Jack Waite 6–2, 6–1

- It was Oncins's 3rd title of the year and the 5th of his career. It was Orsanic's 2nd title of the year and the 7th of his career.
