= 1999 Mercedes Cup – Singles =

Singles
- 1999 Mercedes Cup

Final
- Champion: (Sweden) Magnus Norman
- Runner-up: (Germany) Tommy Haas
- Score: 6–7^{(6–8)}, 4–6, 7–6^{(9–7)}, 6–0, 6–3

Details
- Draw: 48
- Seeds: 16

Events
Singles	Doubles
- Stuttgart Open

Gustavo Kuerten was the defending champion, but retired against Magnus Norman in the second round due to fatigue.

Norman went on to win the title, defeating Tommy Haas 6–7^{(6–8)}, 4–6, 7–6^{(9–7)}, 6–0, 6–3 in the final.

== Seeds ==
All seeds receive a bye into the second round.

1. (Brazil) Gustavo Kuerten (second round, retired due to fatigue)
2. (Spain) Carlos Moyá (quarterfinals)
3. (Chile) Marcelo Ríos (quarterfinals)
4. (Slovakia) Karol Kučera (third round)
5. (Spain) Àlex Corretja (semifinals)
6. (Spain) Félix Mantilla (second round)
7. (Germany) Tommy Haas (final)
8. (Slovakia) Dominik Hrbatý (third round)
9. (Sweden) Thomas Johansson (second round)
10. (Ecuador) Nicolás Lapentti (quarterfinals)
11. (Spain) Albert Costa (third round)
12. (Spain) Francisco Clavet (third round)
13. (United States) Vince Spadea (quarterfinals)
14. (Argentina) Mariano Zabaleta (second round)
15. (Morocco) Younes El Aynaoui (second round)
16. (Brazil) Fernando Meligeni (third round)

== Draw ==
Key

- Q = Qualifier
- WC = Wild card
- LL = Lucky loser
- Alt = Alternate
- ITF = ITF entry
- PR = Protected ranking
- SR = Special ranking
- SE = Special exempt
- JE = Junior exempt
- JR = Junior Accelerator Programme entrant
- CO = College Accelerator Programme entrant
- NG = Next Gen Accelerator Program entrant
- w/o = Walkover
- r = Retired
- d = Defaulted

=== Finals ===
Quarterfinals
(Sweden) Magnus Norman	7^{7}	4	6
10	(Ecuador) Nicolás Lapentti	6^{5}	6	2
3	(Chile) Marcelo Ríos	2	2
(Czech Republic) Jiří Novák	6	6
5	(Spain) Àlex Corretja	1	6	6
13	(United States) Vince Spadea	6	3	2
7	(Germany) Tommy Haas	7^{7}	6
2	(Spain) Carlos Moyá	6^{3}	2

Semifinals
(Sweden) Magnus Norman	6	6
(Czech Republic) Jiří Novák	1	2
5	(Spain) Àlex Corretja	4	4
7	(Germany) Tommy Haas	6	6

Final
(Sweden) Magnus Norman	6^{6}	4	7^{9}	6	6
7	(Germany) Tommy Haas	7^{8}	6	6^{7}	0	3

=== Top half ===
==== Section 1 ====
First round
(Argentina) F Squillari	4	0
(Sweden) M Norman	6	6
WC	(Germany) O Gross	3	6^{3}
(Australia) R Fromberg	6	7^{7}
(Austria) S Koubek	7	6
(Australia) A Ilie	5	3
Q	(Uruguay) M Filippini	6	2	0
WC	(Germany) B Karbacher	3	6	6

Second round
1	(Brazil) G Kuerten	2^{r}
(Sweden) M Norman	5
(Australia) R Fromberg	7^{7}	1	7^{7}
15	(Morocco) Y El Aynaoui	6^{4}	6	6^{0}
10	(Ecuador) N Lapentti	6	6
(Austria) S Koubek	4	4
WC	(Germany) B Karbacher	6	3	2
8	(Slovakia) D Hrbatý	1	6	6

Third round
(Sweden) M Norman	6	6
(Australia) R Fromberg	2	1
10	(Ecuador) N Lapentti	7	6
8	(Slovakia) D Hrbatý	5	3

Quarterfinals
(Sweden) M Norman	7^{7}	4	6
10	(Ecuador) N Lapentti	6^{5}	6	2

==== Section 2 ====
First round
(France) S Grosjean	2	1
Q	(Argentina) H Gumy	6	6
(Slovakia) J Krošlák	4	3
WC	(Germany) J Knippschild	6	6
WC	(Germany) B Phau	6	6
Q	(Romania) A Voinea	1	3
(Czech Republic) J Novák	7^{9}	6
(France) F Santoro	6^{7}	1

Second round
3	(Chile) M Ríos	6^{2}	7^{8}	6
Q	(Argentina) H Gumy	7^{7}	6^{6}	0
WC	(Germany) J Knippschild	7^{7}	6
14	(Argentina) M Zabaleta	6^{4}	1
12	(Spain) F Clavet	6	6
WC	(Germany) B Phau	4	0
(Czech Republic) J Novák	7	6
6	(Spain) F Mantilla	5	1

Third round
3	(Chile) M Ríos	6	6
WC	(Germany) J Knippschild	4	4
12	(Spain) F Clavet	6	3	2
(Czech Republic) J Novák	2	6	6

Quarterfinals
3	(Chile) M Ríos	2	2
(Czech Republic) J Novák	6	6

=== Bottom half ===
==== Section 3 ====
First round
(France) A Clément	3	4
(Germany) R Schüttler	6	6
(Spain) A Martín	6^{0}	3
(Spain) F Vicente	7^{7}	6
Q	(Argentina) A Calleri	4	6	6^{1}
(Morocco) K Alami	6	4	7^{7}
(Sweden) M Gustafsson	6	2	6
(Morocco) H Arazi	2	6	3

Second round
5	(Spain) À Corretja	6	6
(Germany) R Schüttler	2	2
(Spain) F Vicente	4	6^{3}
11	(Spain) A Costa	6	7^{7}
13	(United States) V Spadea	6	6
(Morocco) K Alami	2	2
(Sweden) M Gustafsson	2	2
4	(Slovakia) K Kučera	6	6

Third round
5	(Spain) À Corretja	2	6	6
11	(Spain) A Costa	6	4	1
13	(United States) V Spadea	6	3	7^{7}
4	(Slovakia) K Kučera	3	6	6^{1}

Quarterfinals
5	(Spain) À Corretja	1	6	6
13	(United States) V Spadea	6	3	2

==== Section 4 ====
First round
(Argentina) M Puerta	6	6
(Russia) M Safin	3	4
(Ukraine) A Medvedev	5	0^{r}
(Norway) C Ruud	7	1
Q	(Croatia) I Ljubičić	6^{5}	6^{5}
(Argentina) G Gaudio	7^{7}	7^{7}
(Czech Republic) B Ulihrach	6	6
Q	(Germany) K Braasch	4	2

Second round
7	(Germany) T Haas	w/o
(Argentina) M Puerta
(Norway) C Ruud	6	6
9	(Sweden) T Johansson	2	1
16	(Brazil) F Meligeni	7^{7}	6
(Argentina) G Gaudio	6^{3}	4
(Czech Republic) B Ulihrach	3	6	6^{3}
2	(Spain) C Moyá	6	4	7^{7}

Third round
7	(Germany) T Haas	7	6
(Norway) C Ruud	5	3
16	(Brazil) F Meligeni	4	3
2	(Spain) C Moyá	6	6

Quarterfinals
7	(Germany) T Haas	7^{7}	6
2	(Spain) C Moyá	6^{3}	2
