= Eric Taino =

American tennis player

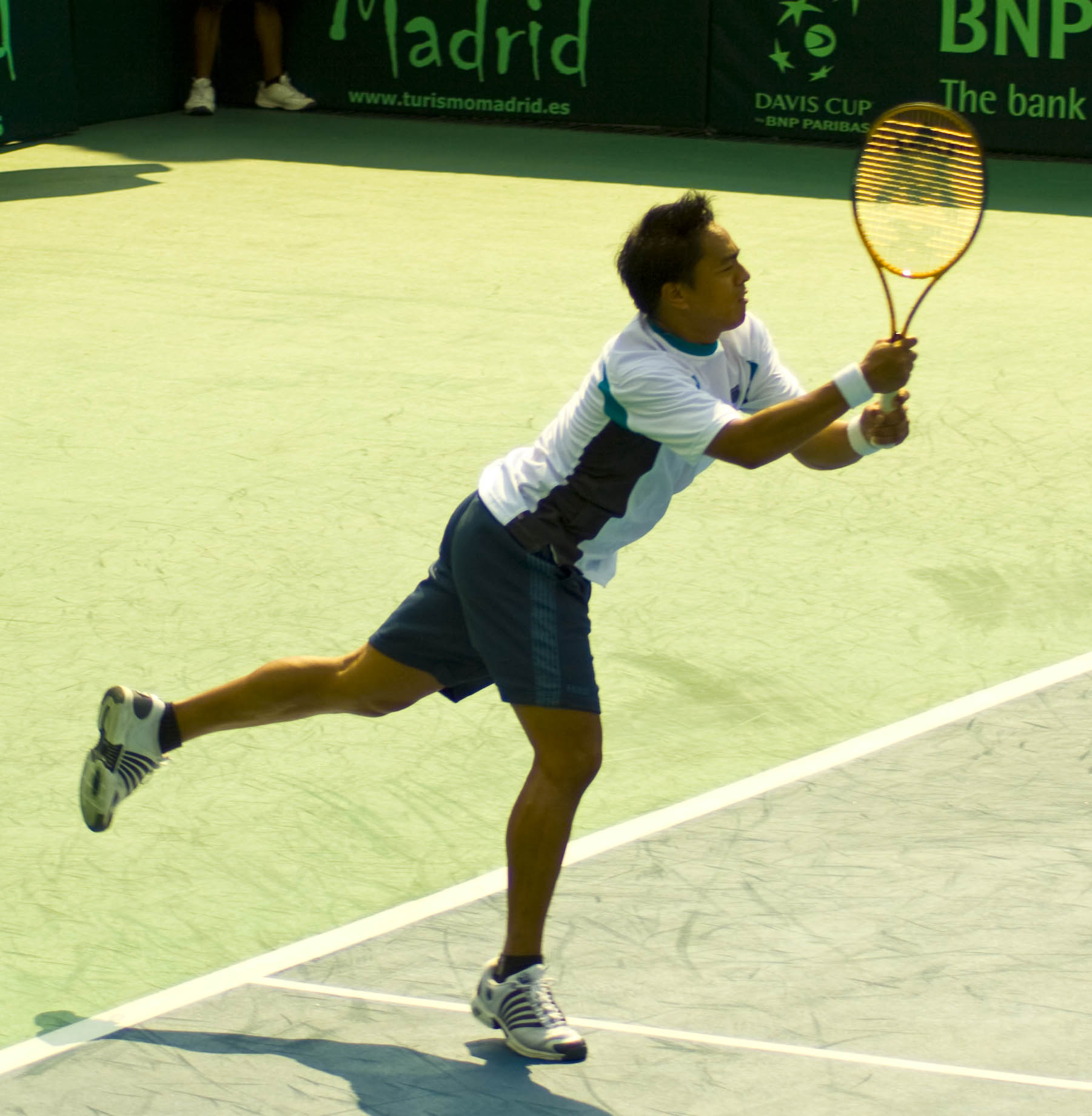
- Country (sports): Philippines
- Residence: Los Angeles, California, U.S.
- Born: 18 March 1975 (age 51) Jersey City, New Jersey, U.S.
- Height: 5 ft 9 in (1.75 m)
- Turned pro: 1997
- Retired: 2008
- Plays: Left-handed
- College: UCLA
- Prize money: $542,367

Singles
- Career record: 14–20
- Career titles: 0
- Highest ranking: No. 122 (3 November 2003)

Grand Slam singles results
- Australian Open: Q2 (2001, 2003)
- French Open: Q1 (2001, 2002, 2003, 2004, 2006)
- Wimbledon: Q2 (2002)
- US Open: 1R (2001, 2002)

Doubles
- Career record: 50–65
- Career titles: 1
- Highest ranking: No. 52 (24 April 2000)

Grand Slam doubles results
- Australian Open: 2R (1999, 2000)
- French Open: 2R (2001)
- Wimbledon: 1R (2000, 2001)
- US Open: 2R (2002)

Grand Slam mixed doubles results
- Wimbledon: QF (2000)
Medal record
Tennis
Representing Philippines
Asian Games
Bronze medal – third place	2006 Doha	Doubles
Southeast Asian Games
Gold medal – first place	2005 Manila	Team
Silver medal – second place	2005 Manila	Doubles
Silver medal – second place	2007 Korat	Doubles
Bronze medal – third place	2005 Manila	Singles
Bronze medal – third place	2007 Korat	Doubles
Bronze medal – third place	2007 Korat	Team
- Last updated on: 26 June 2021.

Eric Taino (born March 18, 1975) is a retired ATP Tour American tennis player, who later represented the Philippines in international competition.

Before turning pro, he was the #1 player and captain of the then #2 nationally ranked UCLA tennis team and achieved All-American honors. His teammates included fellow pros Justin Gimelstob and Kevin Kim.

As a junior player, he won the 1992 US Open – Boys' Doubles with Jimmy Jackson by defeating the Chileans future World no. 1 singles player Marcelo Ríos and Gabriel Silberstein. He started a professional career in 1997 and achieved the highest ranking of world No. 122 as a singles player on the ATP Tour in November 2003. He was also ranked as high as 52nd in the world in April 2000 as a doubles player. He won a doubles title in 1999 Singapore Open with Belarusian partner and future world No. 1 doubles player Max Mirnyi beating The Woodies in the final.

In 2006, Taino won the bronze medal in the men's doubles tournament at the Asian Games held in Doha, Qatar together with his fellow Filipino-American partner Cecil Mamiit, losing to Indian pair and top doubles players Mahesh Bhupathi and Leander Paes.

He played for the Philippines Davis Cup team until 2008. Since his retirement, Taino returned to UCLA to finish his degree and remains active in tennis, coaching and playing in Los Angeles, where he resides with his family.

== Junior Grand Slam finals ==
=== Doubles: 1 (1 title) ===
Result	Year	Tournament	Surface	Partner	Opponents	Score
Win	1992	US Open	Hard	(United States) Jimmy Jackson	(Chile) Marcelo Ríos (Chile) Gabriel Silberstein	6–3, 3–6, 6–1

== ATP Career Finals ==
=== Doubles: 7 (1 title, 6 runner-ups) ===
Legend (doubles) Grand Slam (0–0) ATP World Tour Finals (0–0) ATP Masters Series (0–0) ATP Championship Series (1–0) ATP World Series (0–6)	Finals by surface Hard (1–1) Clay (0–3) Grass (0–2) Carpet (0–0)	Finals by setting Outdoor (0–0) Indoor (1–6)

Result	W–L	Date	Tournament	Tier	Surface	Partner	Opponents	Score
Loss	0–1	Nov 1998	Bogotá, Colombia	World Series	Clay	(Hungary) Gábor Köves	(Argentina) Diego del Río (Argentina) Mariano Puerta	7–6, 3–6, 2–6
Loss	0–2	Jun 1999	Merano Open, Italy	World Series	Clay	(Germany) Marc-Kevin Goellner	(Argentina) Lucas Arnold Ker (Brazil) Jaime Oncins	4–6, 6–7
Loss	0–3	Jul 1999	Gstaad, Switzerland	World Series	Clay	(North Macedonia) Aleksandar Kitinov	(United States) Donald Johnson (Czech Republic) Cyril Suk	5–7, 6–7
Win	1–3	Oct 1999	Singapore Open, Singapore	Championship Series	Hard	(Belarus) Max Mirnyi	(Australia) Todd Woodbridge (Australia) Mark Woodforde	6–3, 6–4
Loss	1–4	Feb 2000	San Jose, United States	International Series	Hard	(Argentina) Lucas Arnold Ker	(United States) Scott Humphries (United States) Jan-Michael Gambill	1–6, 4–6
Loss	1–5	Jun 2000	Queen's, United Kingdom	International Series	Grass	(United States) Jonathan Stark	(Australia) Todd Woodbridge (Australia) Mark Woodforde	7–6^{(7–5)}, 3–6, 6–7^{(1–7)}
Loss	1–6	Jun 2001	Queen's, United Kingdom	International Series	Grass	(United States) David Wheaton	(United States) Bob Bryan (United States) Mike Bryan	3–6, 6–3, 1–6

== ATP Challenger and ITF Futures finals ==
=== Singles: 7 (3–4) ===
Legend ATP Challenger (3–3) ITF Futures (0–1)	Finals by surface Hard (2–4) Clay (0–0) Grass (0–0) Carpet (1–0)

Result	W–L	Date	Tournament	Tier	Surface	Opponent	Score
Loss	0–1	Nov 1999	USA F20, Clearwater	Futures	Hard	(United States) James Blake	4–6, 7–6, 6–7
Win	1–1	Nov 2000	Yokohama, Japan	Challenger	Carpet	(Austria) Julian Knowle	7–6^{(7–5)}, 6–4
Win	2–1	Aug 2001	Belo Horizonte, Brazil	Challenger	Hard	(Brazil) Flávio Saretta	5–7, 6–1, 6–2
Win	3–1	Aug 2002	Tarzana, United States	Challenger	Hard	(United States) Brian Vahaly	6–2, 7–6^{(8–6)}
Loss	3–2	Nov 2002	Champaign-Urbana, United States	Challenger	Hard	(United States) Robby Ginepri	1–6, 6–3, 3–6
Loss	3–3	Mar 2003	Besançon, France	Challenger	Hard	(France) Cyril Saulnier	6–7^{(8–10)}, 4–6
Loss	3–4	Jul 2003	Granby, Canada	Challenger	Hard	(Canada) Frank Dancevic	6–7^{(10–12)}, 1–6

=== Doubles: 21 (10–11) ===
Legend ATP Challenger (9–11) ITF Futures (1–0)	Finals by surface Hard (7–10) Clay (3–1) Grass (0–0) Carpet (0–0)

Result	W–L	Date	Tournament	Tier	Surface	Partner	Opponents	Score
Loss	0–1	Oct 1997	Sedona, United States	Challenger	Hard	(United States) Adam Peterson	(South Africa) John-Laffnie de Jager (South Africa) Robbie Koenig	2–6, 2–6
Win	1–1	Mar 1998	Philippines F1, Manila	Futures	Hard	(United States) Cecil Mamiit	(France) Maxime Boyé (France) Thierry Guardiola	4–6, 6–2, 6–1
Loss	1–2	Apr 1998	Birmingham, United States	Challenger	Clay	(Israel) Eyal Erlich	(United States) Doug Flach (United States) David Witt	4–6, 5–7
Win	2–2	Jun 1998	Biella, Italy	Challenger	Clay	(Argentina) Diego del Río	(Portugal) Emanuel Couto (Portugal) João Cunha-Silva	7–6, 5–7, 6–2
Loss	2–3	Aug 1998	Tijuana, Mexico	Challenger	Hard	(United States) Mitch Sprengelmeyer	(Australia) Michael Hill (United States) Scott Humphries	3–6, 2–6
Win	3–3	Jun 1999	Prostějov, Czech Republic	Challenger	Clay	(Romania) Dinu-Mihai Pescariu	(United States) Devin Bowen (Israel) Eyal Ran	6–3, 6–3
Win	4–3	Aug 2000	Gramado, Brazil	Challenger	Hard	(Brazil) André Sá	(Brazil) Daniel Melo (Brazil) Alexandre Simoni	7–6^{(9–7)}, 7–6^{(7–3)}
Loss	4–4	Nov 2000	Osaka, Japan	Challenger	Hard	(Japan) Yaoki Ishii	(Czech Republic) František Čermák (Czech Republic) Ota Fukárek	1–6, 6–7^{(5–7)}
Win	5–4	Feb 2001	Ho Chi Minh City, Vietnam	Challenger	Hard	(Japan) Takao Suzuki	(Italy) Filippo Messori (Italy) Vincenzo Santopadre	7–6^{(9–7)}, 2–6, 6–4
Loss	5–5	Aug 2001	Belo Horizonte, Brazil	Challenger	Hard	(United Kingdom) Barry Cowan	(Australia) Dejan Petrovic (Israel) Andy Ram	3–6, 4–6
Win	6–5	May 2002	Rocky Mount, United States	Challenger	Clay	(The Bahamas) Mark Merklein	(United States) Huntley Montgomery (United States) Brian Vahaly	6–3, 6–4
Loss	6–6	Aug 2002	Lexington, United States	Challenger	Hard	(United States) Brandon Coupe	(United States) Glenn Weiner (United States) Jack Brasington	2–6, 6–4, 5–7
Loss	6–7	Nov 2002	Champaign-Urbana, United States	Challenger	Hard	(Netherlands) Martin Verkerk	(United States) Glenn Weiner (Romania) Gabriel Trifu	3–6, 2–6
Loss	6–8	Feb 2004	Dallas, United States	Challenger	Hard	(South Africa) Rik de Voest	(Australia) Jordan Kerr (Australia) Todd Perry	5–7, 3–6
Loss	6–9	Jul 2004	Aptos, United States	Challenger	Hard	(United States) Diego Ayala	(United States) Tripp Phillips (United States) Huntley Montgomery	6–7^{(3–7)}, 5–7
Loss	6–10	Oct 2004	Burbank, United States	Challenger	Hard	(India) Prakash Amritraj	(United States) Nick Rainey (United States) Brian Wilson	2–6, 3–6
Win	7–10	Jan 2005	Waikoloa, United States	Challenger	Hard	(Brazil) André Sá	(Thailand) Sonchat Ratiwatana (Thailand) Sanchai Ratiwatana	7–6^{(7–2)}, 3–6, 7–6^{(7–2)}
Win	8–10	Mar 2005	Ho Chi Minh City, Vietnam	Challenger	Hard	(United States) Cecil Mamiit	(Pakistan) Aisam Qureshi (Ukraine) Orest Tereshchuk	6–3, 2–6, 6–4
Win	9–10	Jul 2005	Aptos, United States	Challenger	Hard	(Australia) Nathan Healey	(Israel) Noam Okun (Israel) Harel Levy	7–5, 7–6^{(7–4)}
Win	10–10	Jul 2006	Winnetka, United States	Challenger	Hard	(United States) Cecil Mamiit	(United States) Scoville Jenkins (United States) Rajeev Ram	6–2, 6–4
Loss	10–11	Apr 2007	Valencia, United States	Challenger	Hard	(Philippines) Cecil Mamiit	(United States) Sam Warburg (Israel) Harel Levy	2–6, 4–6

== Performance timelines ==
Key
W	F	SF	QF	#R	RR	Q#	DNQ	A	NH

(W) winner; (F) finalist; (SF) semifinalist; (QF) quarterfinalist; (#R) rounds 4, 3, 2, 1; (RR) round-robin stage; (Q#) qualification round; (DNQ) did not qualify; (A) absent; (NH) not held; (SR) strike rate (events won / competed); (W–L) win–loss record.

=== Singles ===
Tournament	2000	2001	2002	2003	2004	2005	2006	2007	SR	W–L	Win %
Grand Slam tournaments
Australian Open	Q1	Q2	Q1	Q2	Q1	Q1	Q1	A	0 / 0	0–0	–
French Open	A	Q1	Q1	Q1	Q1	A	Q1	A	0 / 0	0–0	–
Wimbledon	A	Q1	Q2	Q1	Q1	A	A	A	0 / 0	0–0	–
US Open	A	1R	1R	Q1	Q1	A	A	A	0 / 2	0–2	0%
Win–loss	0–0	0–1	0–1	0–0	0–0	0–0	0–0	0–0	0 / 2	0–2	0%
ATP Tour Masters 1000
Indian Wells	A	A	A	A	Q1	A	Q2	Q1	0 / 0	0–0	–
Miami Open	A	A	A	Q1	Q2	A	A	A	0 / 0	0–0	–
Win–loss	0–0	0–0	0–0	0–0	0–0	0–0	0–0	0–0	0 / 0	0–0	–

=== Doubles ===
Tournament	1994	1995	1996	1997	1998	1999	2000	2001	2002	SR	W–L	Win %
Grand Slam tournaments
Australian Open	A	A	A	A	A	2R	2R	1R	1R	0 / 4	2–4	33%
French Open	A	A	A	A	A	1R	1R	2R	1R	0 / 4	1–4	20%
Wimbledon	A	A	A	A	A	A	1R	1R	Q1	0 / 2	0–2	0%
US Open	Q1	Q1	A	1R	A	1R	1R	1R	2R	0 / 5	1–5	17%
Win–loss	0–0	0–0	0–0	0–1	0–0	1–3	1–4	1–4	1–3	0 / 15	4–15	–
ATP Tour Masters 1000
Miami Open	A	A	A	A	A	Q1	2R	Q1	A	0 / 1	1–1	50%
Monte Carlo	A	A	A	A	A	Q1	2R	A	A	0 / 1	1–1	50%
Canada Masters	A	A	A	A	A	1R	A	A	A	0 / 1	0–1	0%
Cincinnati Masters	A	A	A	Q1	A	A	A	A	A	0 / 0	0–0	–
Win–loss	0–0	0–0	0–0	0–0	0–0	0–1	2–2	0–0	0–0	0 / 3	2–3	40%
