= 1999 Mercedes Cup – Doubles =

Doubles
- 1999 Mercedes Cup

Final
- Champion: (Brazil) Jaime Oncins (Argentina) Daniel Orsanic
- Runner-up: (North Macedonia) Aleksandar Kitinov (United States) Jack Waite
- Score: 6–2, 6–1

Details
- Draw: 24
- Seeds: 8

Events
Singles	Doubles
- Stuttgart Open

Olivier Delaître and Fabrice Santoro were the defending champions, but both players decided to rest after competing in the quarterfinals of the Davis Cup. However, Santoro competed in the singles tournament, losing in first round to Jiří Novák.

Jaime Oncins and Daniel Orsanic won the title by defeating Aleksandar Kitinov and Jack Waite 6–2, 6–1 in the final.

== Seeds ==
All seeds received a bye into the second round.

1. (Czech Republic) Jiří Novák / (Czech Republic) David Rikl (quarterfinals)
2. (United States) Donald Johnson / (Czech Republic) Cyril Suk (quarterfinals)
3. (South Africa) Piet Norval / (Zimbabwe) Kevin Ullyett (second round)
4. (South Africa) David Adams / (Czech Republic) Pavel Vízner (quarterfinals)
5. (South Africa) Robbie Koenig / (Australia) Peter Tramacchi (second round)
6. (South Africa) Chris Haggard / (Sweden) Peter Nyborg (second round)
7. (South Africa) Lan Bale / (United Kingdom) Neil Broad (semifinals)
8. (Italy) Massimo Bertolini / (Italy) Cristian Brandi (second round)

== Draw ==
Key

- Q = Qualifier
- WC = Wild card
- LL = Lucky loser
- Alt = Alternate
- ITF = ITF entry
- PR = Protected ranking
- SR = Special ranking
- SE = Special exempt
- JE = Junior exempt
- JR = Junior Accelerator Programme entrant
- CO = College Accelerator Programme entrant
- NG = Next Gen Accelerator Program entrant
- w/o = Walkover
- r = Retired
- d = Defaulted

=== Finals ===
Semifinals
7	(South Africa) Lan Bale (United Kingdom) Neil Broad	1	4
(North Macedonia) Aleksandar Kitinov (United States) Jack Waite	6	6
(Brazil) Jaime Oncins (Argentina) Daniel Orsanic	4	6	7^{9}
(United States) Devin Bowen (Spain) Alberto Martín	6	2	6^{7}

Final
(North Macedonia) Aleksandar Kitinov (United States) Jack Waite	2	1
(Brazil) Jaime Oncins (Argentina) Daniel Orsanic	6	6

=== Top half ===
First round
(Czech Republic) T Anzari (Federal Republic of Yugoslavia) N Đorđević	6^{2}	3
(Sweden) T Johansson (Sweden) M Norman	7^{7}	6
(Argentina) M Puerta (Spain) J Sánchez
Q	(Australia) R Fromberg (Croatia) I Ljubičić	w/o
(United States) M Keil (Brazil) F Meligeni	6	6^{3}	6
WC	(Germany) S Fitz (Germany) M Sinner	4	7^{7}	3
(North Macedonia) A Kitinov (United States) J Waite	4	6	6
(Czech Republic) S Doseděl (Czech Republic) T Krupa	6	2	2

Second round
1	(Czech Republic) J Novák (Czech Republic) D Rikl	6	6
(Sweden) T Johansson (Sweden) M Norman	4	4
Q	(Australia) R Fromberg (Croatia) I Ljubičić	4	3
7	(South Africa) L Bale (United Kingdom) N Broad	6	6
4	(South Africa) D Adams (Czech Republic) P Vízner	6	6
(United States) M Keil (Brazil) F Meligeni	3	1
(North Macedonia) A Kitinov (United States) J Waite	6	7^{8}
6	(South Africa) C Haggard (Sweden) P Nyborg	3	6^{6}

Quarterfinals
1	(Czech Republic) J Novák (Czech Republic) D Rikl	6^{5}	2
7	(South Africa) L Bale (United Kingdom) N Broad	7^{7}	6
4	(South Africa) D Adams (Czech Republic) P Vízner	7^{7}	3	4
(North Macedonia) A Kitinov (United States) J Waite	6^{5}	6	6

Semifinals
7	(South Africa) L Bale (United Kingdom) N Broad	1	4
(North Macedonia) A Kitinov (United States) J Waite	6	6

=== Bottom half ===
First round
WC	(Germany) M-K Goellner (Germany) R Schüttler	4	2
WC	(Spain) C Moyá (Russia) M Safin	6	6
(Brazil) J Oncins (Argentina) D Orsanic	6	6
(Germany) K Braasch (Germany) B Karbacher	4	3
(United States) D Bowen (Spain) A Martín	6	3	7
(Ukraine) A Medvedev (Ukraine) A Rybalko	2	6	5
(Argentina) A Calleri (Uruguay) M Filippini	6^{3}	6^{4}
(Argentina) D del Río (United States) F Montana	7^{7}	7^{7}

Second round
5	(South Africa) R Koenig (Australia) P Tramacchi	7^{7}	6^{2}	6^{3}
WC	(Spain) C Moyá (Russia) M Safin	6^{3}	7^{7}	7^{7}
(Brazil) J Oncins (Argentina) D Orsanic	6	6
3	(South Africa) P Norval (Zimbabwe) K Ullyett	4	2
8	(Italy) C Brandi (Italy) M Bertolini	3	6	4
(United States) D Bowen (Spain) A Martín	6	4	6
(Argentina) D del Río (United States) F Montana	4	6	3
2	(United States) D Johnson (Czech Republic) C Suk	6	4	6

Quarterfinals
WC	(Spain) C Moyá (Russia) M Safin	3	6	4
(Brazil) J Oncins (Argentina) D Orsanic	6	1	6
(United States) D Bowen (Spain) A Martín	6	7
2	(United States) D Johnson (Czech Republic) C Suk	1	5

Semifinals
(Brazil) J Oncins (Argentina) D Orsanic	4	6	7^{9}
(United States) D Bowen (Spain) A Martín	6	2	6^{7}
