= Diego del Río =

Argentine tennis player

- Country (sports): Argentina
- Born: 4 September 1972 (age 53) Buenos Aires, Argentina
- Height: 5 ft 9 in (175 cm)
- Turned pro: 1990
- Plays: Right-handed
- Prize money: $181,755

Singles
- Career record: 0–1
- Career titles: 0
- Highest ranking: No. 274 (12 September 1994)

Doubles
- Career record: 19–34
- Career titles: 1
- Highest ranking: No. 66 (9 November 1998)

Grand Slam doubles results
- Australian Open: 1R (1999, 2000)
- French Open: 3R (1999)
- Wimbledon: 1R (1999)
- US Open: 1R (1998, 1999)

Diego del Río (born 4 September 1972) is a former professional tennis player from Argentina.

== Career ==
del Rio was a doubles specialist and appeared in the main draw of seven Grand Slam tournaments. He only once progressed past the first round, which was in the 1999 French Open with Martín Rodríguez, where they made the round of 16. The Argentine also competed in the mixed doubles in that event (partnering Laura Montalvo), as well as at that year's Wimbledon (with María Fernanda Landa), but fell at the first round in each. He was involved in a long deciding set in the 1999 Australian Open, which he and partner Mariano Puerta lost 13–15, to Brent Haygarth and T. J. Middleton.

In 1998 he and Puerta won the Colombia Open. It would be the only final that del Rio reached during his career on the ATP Tour. He had also been a semi-finalist in Colombia two years earlier and made the semi-finals at the 1999 Merano Open.

== ATP career finals ==
=== Doubles: 1 (1–0) ===
Result	W/L	Date	Tournament	Surface	Partner	Opponents	Score
Win	1–0	Nov 1998	Bogotá, Colombia	Clay	(Argentina) Mariano Puerta	(Hungary) Gábor Köves (Philippines) Eric Taino	6–7, 6–3, 6–2

== Challenger titles ==
=== Doubles: (12) ===
No.	Year	Tournament	Surface	Partner	Opponents	Score
1.	1997	Geneva, Switzerland	Clay	(Argentina) Mariano Puerta	(France) Guillaume Marx (France) Olivier Morel	6–3, 6–4
2.	1997	Buenos Aires, Argentina	Clay	(Argentina) Daniel Orsanic	(Argentina) Pablo Albano (Argentina) Luis Lobo	6–4, 4–6, 6–1
3.	1998	Biella, Italy	Clay	(Philippines) Eric Taino	(Portugal) Emanuel Couto (Portugal) João Cunha-Silva	7–6, 5–7, 6–2
4.	1998	Contrexéville, France	Clay	(Argentina) Martín Rodríguez	(Spain) Álex López Morón (Spain) Jairo Velasco Jr.	7–6, 4–6, 6–4
5.	1998	São Paulo, Brazil	Clay	(Argentina) Martín Rodríguez	(Netherlands) Edwin Kempes (Netherlands) Peter Wessels	7–6, 6–3
6.	1998	Lima, Peru	Clay	(Argentina) Martín Rodríguez	(Argentina) Federico Browne (Argentina) Eduardo Medica	6–4, 7–6
7.	2000	Geneva, Switzerland	Clay	(Argentina) Edgardo Massa	(Switzerland) Yves Allegro (France) Julien Cuaz	7–5, 7–6^{(8–6)}
8.	2001	Montauban, France	Clay	(Russia) Vadim Kutsenko	(Finland) Tuomas Ketola (Bulgaria) Orlin Stanoytchev	6–4, 6–2
9.	2001	Geneva, Switzerland	Clay	(Bulgaria) Orlin Stanoytchev	(Spain) Feliciano López (Spain) Francisco Roig	2–6, 7–6^{(7–0)}, 7–6^{(7–3)}
10.	2001	Montevideo, Uruguay	Clay	(Argentina) Martín Vassallo Argüello	(Argentina) Gastón Etlis (Argentina) Mariano Hood	W/O
11.	2002	Freudenstadt, Germany	Clay	(Argentina) Leonardo Olguín	(Spain) Juan Balcells (Kazakhstan) Yuri Schukin	7–6^{(7–2)}, 6–4
12.	2002	Aschaffenburg, Germany	Clay	(Argentina) Andrés Schneiter	(Hungary) Kornél Bardóczky (Hungary) Zoltán Nagy	6–3, 3–6, 6–3
