= Florian Allgauer =

Italian tennis player

- Country (sports): Italy
- Born: 7 January 1979 (age 46); Bruneck, South Tyrol, Italy
- Plays: Right-handed
- Prize money: $45,256

Singles
- Career record: 0–1 (ATP Tour)
- Highest ranking: No. 216 (26 Jul 1999)

Grand Slam singles results
- Wimbledon: Q1 (2000)

Doubles
- Career record: 0–1 (ATP Tour)
- Highest ranking: No. 261 (15 Nov 1999)

Florian Allgauer (born 7 January 1979) is an Italian former professional tennis player.

== Tennis career ==
A native of South Tyrol, Allgauer was a promising player at junior level and won the Trofeo Bonfiglio (Italian juniors) in 1997, ending the year ranked 14th in the world. On the professional tour he reached a career high singles ranking of 216 and made his only ATP Tour main draw appearance in 1999 at the Merano Open, losing to Galo Blanco 4-6 3-6. He featured in the qualifying draw for the 2000 Wimbledon Championships.

On the ATP Challenger circuit, he reached three semi-finals, in Montauban (1999) l. Emmanuel Couto, Mumbai (2000) l. Dennis van Scheppingen and Bressanone (2001) l. Alessio di Mauro.

== Personal life ==
Allgauer was in a relationship with tennis player Flavia Pennetta in the early 2000s.

== ITF Futures titles ==
=== Singles: 1 ===
Date	Tournament	Surface	Opponent	Score
May 1999	Italy F8, Forlì	Clay	(Italy) Filippo Messori	6–1, 1–6, 6–2

=== Doubles: 1 ===
Date	Tournament	Surface	Partner	Opponents	Score
Jul 1998	Italy F11, Forlì	Clay	(Italy) Igor Gaudi	(Italy) Alessandro da Col (Italy) Matteo Gotti	4–6, 7–5, 6–3
