= Martin Spöttl =

Austrian tennis player

- Full name: Martin Spöttl
- Country (sports): Austria
- Born: 23 November 1975 (age 49); Dornbirn, Austria
- Height: 5 ft 11 in (180 cm)
- Plays: Right-handed
- Prize money: $55,466

Singles
- Career record: 2–3
- Highest ranking: No. 181 (1 May 2000)

Martin Spöttl (born 23 November 1975) is a former professional tennis player from Austria.

== Biography ==
Spöttl, a right-handed player from Dornbirn, began competing on the professional tour in 1994.

He won his way through qualifying to make his ATP Tour main draw debut at the 1999 Merano Open, where he beat Eduardo Medica and then Markus Hipfl to make the quarter-finals. His performances in Challenger tournaments in 1999, which included a runner-up finish at the Tampere Open, helped give him an end of year ranking of 201, having started the season ranked outside the world's top 500.

In 2000 he reached his best ranking of 181 and qualified for two further ATP Tour main draws, at the Gold Flake Open in Chennai and Chevrolet Cup in Santiago.

Retiring in 2001, Spöttl now works as a tennis coach.
