= Hicham Arazi =

Moroccan tennis player (born 1973)

Hicham Arazi هشام أرازي
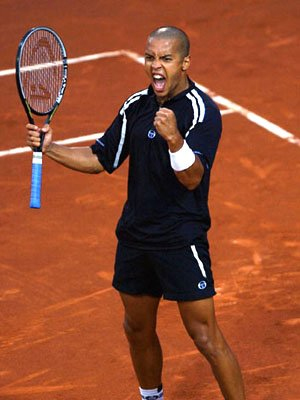
- Country (sports): Morocco
- Residence: Monte Carlo, Monaco
- Born: 19 October 1973 (age 52) Casablanca, Morocco
- Height: 1.75 m (5 ft 9 in)
- Turned pro: 1993
- Retired: 2007
- Plays: Left-handed (one-handed backhand)
- Prize money: $3,602,644

Singles
- Career record: 219–225
- Career titles: 1
- Highest ranking: No. 22 (5 November 2001)

Grand Slam singles results
- Australian Open: QF (2000, 2004)
- French Open: QF (1997, 1998)
- Wimbledon: 3R (1998, 2000, 2001, 2004)
- US Open: 3R (1999, 2000, 2001)

Other tournaments
- Grand Slam Cup: 1R (1998)
- Olympic Games: 1R (1996, 2004)

Doubles
- Career record: 37–60
- Career titles: 0
- Highest ranking: No. 144 (21 June 2004)

Grand Slam doubles results
- Australian Open: 3R (2004)
- French Open: 1R (2001, 2004)
- Wimbledon: 2R (2003)
- US Open: 1R (2003, 2004)

Grand Slam mixed doubles results
- French Open: 1R (1999)

Hicham Arazi (Arabic: هشام أرازي; born 19 October 1973) is a Moroccan former professional tennis player. He played professionally from 1993 to the end of 2007. The left-hander reached his career-high ATP singles ranking of world No. 22 on November 5, 2001. During his career, Arazi captured one ATP Tour singles title, in Casablanca. "The Moroccan Magician" reached the quarter-finals of the Australian Open twice and the French Open twice. Some tennis analysts also called him "The Moroccan McEnroe" due to his talent – he played with incredible touch, and often enjoyed the support of the crowd even when not at home. He led Patrick Rafter, winner of the US Open in 1997 and 1998, two sets to love during the first round of the latter tournament. In the fourth set he was upset with several line calls, telling umpire Norm Chryst to "get out of here", which sparked the beginning of Arazi's meltdown (and Rafter's comeback). During his career, he notably gained victories over former world No. 1s and major champions Roger Federer, Andre Agassi, Yevgeny Kafelnikov, Marat Safin, Lleyton Hewitt, Juan Carlos Ferrero, Carlos Moyá and Jim Courier.

== ATP Masters Series finals ==
=== Singles (1 runner-up) ===
Outcome	Year	Tournament	Opponent	Score
Runner-up	2001	Monte Carlo	(Brazil) Gustavo Kuerten	3–6, 2–6, 4–6

== Career finals ==
Legend
Grand Slam
Tennis Masters Cup
ATP Masters Series
ATP Tour

=== Singles (1 title, 2 runners-up) ===
Result	W/L	Date	Tournament	Surface	Opponent	Score
Win	1–0	Mar 1997	Casablanca, Morocco	Clay	(Argentina) Franco Squillari	3–6, 6–1, 6–2
Loss	1–1	Jun 1999	Merano, Italy	Clay	(Spain) Fernando Vicente	2–6, 6–3, 6–7^{(1–7)}
Loss	1–2	Apr 2001	Monte Carlo, Monaco	Clay	(Brazil) Gustavo Kuerten	3–6, 2–6, 4–6

=== Doubles (2 runners-up) ===
Result	W/L	Date	Tournament	Surface	Partner	Opponents	Score
Loss	0–1	Mar 1997	Casablanca, Morocco	Clay	(Morocco) Karim Alami	(Portugal) João Cunha e Silva (Portugal) Nuno Marques	6–7, 2–6
Loss	0–2	Sep 1997	Tashkent, Uzbekistan	Hard	(Israel) Eyal Ran	(Italy) Vincenzo Santopadre (United States) Vince Spadea	4–6, 7–6, 0–6

== Singles performance timeline ==
Key
W	F	SF	QF	#R	RR	Q#	DNQ	A	NH

(W) winner; (F) finalist; (SF) semifinalist; (QF) quarterfinalist; (#R) rounds 4, 3, 2, 1; (RR) round-robin stage; (Q#) qualification round; (DNQ) did not qualify; (A) absent; (NH) not held; (SR) strike rate (events won / competed); (W–L) win–loss record.

Tournament	1995	1996	1997	1998	1999	2000	2001	2002	2003	2004	2005	SR	W–L
Grand Slam tournaments
Australian Open	Q1	Q1	1R	4R	1R	QF	1R	2R	1R	QF	A	0 / 8	12–8
French Open	Q1	Q2	QF	QF	3R	3R	2R	3R	2R	1R	A	0 / 8	16–8
Wimbledon	A	2R	1R	3R	1R	3R	3R	1R	1R	3R	A	0 / 9	9–9
US Open	1R	1R	1R	1R	3R	3R	3R	2R	2R	2R	A	0 / 10	9–10
Win–loss	0–1	1–2	4–4	9–4	4–4	10–4	5–4	4–4	2–4	7–4	0–0	0 / 35	46–35
Year-end championships
Grand Slam Cup	A	A	A	1R	A	Not Held						0 / 1	0–1
ATP Masters Series
Indian Wells	A	A	A	A	2R	QF	1R	A	A	3R	1R	0 / 5	6–5
Miami	A	A	A	A	1R	2R	2R	3R	Q1	1R	A	0 / 5	2–5
Monte Carlo	Q1	A	1R	2R	3R	2R	F	2R	A	1R	Q1	0 / 7	10–7
Hamburg	A	A	QF	3R	3R	1R	3R	1R	A	1R	A	0 / 7	9–7
Rome	A	A	1R	2R	2R	2R	2R	1R	A	2R	A	0 / 7	5–7
Canada	A	A	A	A	A	1R	3R	A	Q2	1R	A	0 / 3	2–3
Cincinnati	A	1R	A	A	A	2R	3R	A	3R	2R	A	0 / 5	6–5
Madrid^{1}	A	A	2R	1R	1R	1R	3R	Q2	A	1R	A	0 / 6	3–6
Paris	Q1	Q1	1R	1R	Q1	A	QF	A	QF	1R	A	0 / 5	6–5
Win–loss	0–0	0–1	4–5	4–5	6–6	6–8	18–9	2–4	5–2	4–9	0–1	0 / 50	49–50
Year-end ranking	141	79	38	36	36	30	25	90	52	62	897		

^{1}This event was held in Essen in 1995, and in Stuttgart from 1996 through 2001.
