= Merano Open =

Defunct tennis tournament
- Event name: Merano Open
- Tour: ATP Tour (1990-1999)
- Founded: 1999
- Abolished: 1999
- Editions: 1
- Location: Merano, Italy
- Venue: Tennis Club Meran
- Category: ATP International Series
- Surface: Clay / outdoor

The Merano Open is a defunct ATP Tour affiliated men's tennis tournament played for one year in 1999. It was held in Merano, Italy and was played on outdoor clay courts at Tennis Club Meran.

== Finals ==
=== Singles ===
Year	Champions	Runners-up	Score
1999	(Spain) Fernando Vicente	(Morocco) Hicham Arazi	6–2, 3–6, 7–6

=== Doubles ===
Year	Champions	Runners-up	Score
1999	(Argentina) Lucas Arnold Ker (Brazil) Jaime Oncins	(Germany) Marc-Kevin Goellner (Philippines) Eric Taino	6–4, 7–6
