= 2000 ATP Tour =

Men's tennis circuit

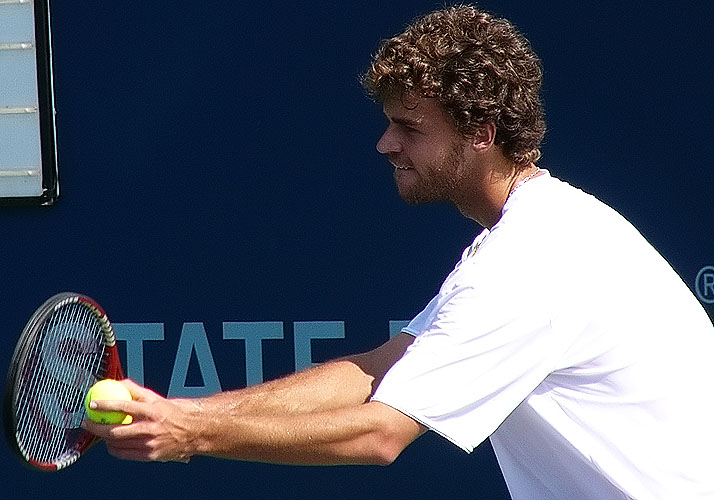
- Gustavo Kuerten finished the year ranked world No. 1 for the first time in his career, becoming the first South American to do so. He won five singles titles during the season, including a major at the French Open, as well as the Tennis Masters Cup. He also won a Masters Series title.

Details
- Duration: January 1 – December 11, 2000
- Edition: 31st
- Tournaments: 74
- Categories: Grand Slam (4); ATP Masters Series (9); ATP International Series Gold (11); ATP International Series (44)

Achievements (singles)
- Most titles: (Russia) Marat Safin (7)
- Most finals: (Russia) Marat Safin (9)
- Prize money leader: (Brazil) Gustavo Kuerten ($4,701,610)
- Points leader: (Brazil) Gustavo Kuerten (4,195)

Awards
- Player of the year: (Brazil) Gustavo Kuerten
- Doubles team of the year: (Australia) Todd Woodbridge (Australia) Mark Woodforde
- Most improved player of the year: (Russia) Marat Safin
- Newcomer of the year: (Belgium) Olivier Rochus
- Comeback player of the year: (Spain) Sergi Bruguera

The Association of Tennis Professionals (ATP) Tour is the elite professional tennis circuit organised by the ATP tour. The 2000 ATP Tour calendar comprises the Grand Slam tournaments (supervised by the International Tennis Federation (ITF)), the tennis event at the 2000 Summer Olympics, the Tennis Masters Series, the ATP International Series Gold, the ATP International Series, the ATP World Team Cup, the Tennis Masters Cup and the ATP Tour World Doubles Championships. Also included in the 2000 calendar are the Davis Cup and the Hopman Cup, which do not distribute ranking points, and are both organised by the ITF.

== Schedule ==
Schedule of events on the 2000 calendar, with player progression documented from the quarterfinals stage.

Key

Grand Slam tournaments
Tennis Masters Cup
Summer Olympics
Tennis Masters Series
ATP International Series Gold
ATP International Series
Team events

=== January ===
Week	Tournament	Champions	Runners-up	Semifinalists	Quarterfinalists
Jan 3	Hopman Cup; Perth, Australia; Hopman Cup; Hard (i) – $900,000 – 8 teams (RR)	South Africa; 3–0	Thailand	Round Robin losers (Group A); Austria; Australia; Slovakia / Japan	Round Robin losers (Group B); Sweden; United States; Belgium
Jan 3	AAPT Championships; Adelaide, Australia; ATP International Series; Hard – $350,000 – 32S/16D; Singles – Doubles	(Australia) Lleyton Hewitt; 3–6, 6–3, 6–2	(Sweden) Thomas Enqvist	(Sweden) Magnus Norman (France) Nicolas Escudé	(France) Sébastien Grosjean (Spain) Alberto Martín (Australia) Jason Stoltenberg (United Kingdom) Tim Henman
Jan 3	AAPT Championships; Adelaide, Australia; ATP International Series; Hard – $350,000 – 32S/16D; Singles – Doubles	(Australia) Todd Woodbridge (Australia) Mark Woodforde; 6–4, 6–2	(Australia) Lleyton Hewitt (Australia) Sandon Stolle	(Sweden) Magnus Norman (France) Nicolas Escudé	(France) Sébastien Grosjean (Spain) Alberto Martín (Australia) Jason Stoltenberg (United Kingdom) Tim Henman
Jan 3	Gold Flake Open; Chennai, India; ATP International Series; Hard – $430,000 – 32S/16D; Singles – Doubles	(France) Jérôme Golmard; 6–3, 6–7^{(6–8)}, 6–3	(Germany) Markus Hantschk	(Czech Republic) Martin Damm (France) Cédric Pioline	(Switzerland) Lorenzo Manta (United Kingdom) Jamie Delgado (Finland) Tuomas Ketola (Italy) Davide Sanguinetti
Jan 3	Gold Flake Open; Chennai, India; ATP International Series; Hard – $430,000 – 32S/16D; Singles – Doubles	(France) Julien Boutter (Belgium) Christophe Rochus; 7–5, 6–1	(India) Saurav Panja (India) Srinath Prahlad	(Czech Republic) Martin Damm (France) Cédric Pioline	(Switzerland) Lorenzo Manta (United Kingdom) Jamie Delgado (Finland) Tuomas Ketola (Italy) Davide Sanguinetti
Jan 3	Qatar Open; Doha, Qatar; ATP International Series; Hard – $1,000,000 – 32S/16D; Singles – Doubles	(France) Fabrice Santoro; 3–6, 7–5, 3–0 retired	(Germany) Rainer Schüttler	(Germany) Nicolas Kiefer (Morocco) Younes El Aynaoui	(Netherlands) Sjeng Schalken (Switzerland) George Bastl (Sweden) Mikael Tillström (Belarus) Max Mirnyi
Jan 3	Qatar Open; Doha, Qatar; ATP International Series; Hard – $1,000,000 – 32S/16D; Singles – Doubles	(The Bahamas) Mark Knowles (Belarus) Max Mirnyi; 6–3, 6–4	(United States) Alex O'Brien (United States) Jared Palmer	(Germany) Nicolas Kiefer (Morocco) Younes El Aynaoui	(Netherlands) Sjeng Schalken (Switzerland) George Bastl (Sweden) Mikael Tillström (Belarus) Max Mirnyi
Jan 10	Heineken Open; Auckland, New Zealand; ATP International Series; Hard – $350,000 – 32S/16D; Singles – Doubles	(Sweden) Magnus Norman; 3–6, 6–3, 7–5	(United States) Michael Chang	(Spain) Joan Balcells (Argentina) Gastón Gaudio	(Spain) Juan Carlos Ferrero (Sweden) Magnus Gustafsson (Netherlands) Sjeng Schalken (Switzerland) Marc Rosset
Jan 10	Heineken Open; Auckland, New Zealand; ATP International Series; Hard – $350,000 – 32S/16D; Singles – Doubles	(South Africa) Ellis Ferreira (United States) Rick Leach; 7–5, 6–4	(France) Olivier Delaître (United States) Jeff Tarango	(Spain) Joan Balcells (Argentina) Gastón Gaudio	(Spain) Juan Carlos Ferrero (Sweden) Magnus Gustafsson (Netherlands) Sjeng Schalken (Switzerland) Marc Rosset
Jan 10	Adidas International; Sydney, Australia; ATP International Series; Hard – $350,000 – 32S/16D; Singles – Doubles	(Australia) Lleyton Hewitt; 6–4, 6–0	(Australia) Jason Stoltenberg	(Spain) Àlex Corretja (Croatia) Ivan Ljubičić	(Romania) Adrian Voinea (Czech Republic) Slava Doseděl (Slovakia) Karol Kučera (Ecuador) Nicolás Lapentti
Jan 10	Adidas International; Sydney, Australia; ATP International Series; Hard – $350,000 – 32S/16D; Singles – Doubles	(Australia) Todd Woodbridge (Australia) Mark Woodforde; 7–5, 6–4	(Australia) Lleyton Hewitt (Australia) Sandon Stolle	(Spain) Àlex Corretja (Croatia) Ivan Ljubičić	(Romania) Adrian Voinea (Czech Republic) Slava Doseděl (Slovakia) Karol Kučera (Ecuador) Nicolás Lapentti
Jan 17; Jan 24	Australian Open; Melbourne, Australia; Grand Slam; Hard – $6,000,000; 128S/64D/32X; Singles – Doubles; Mixed doubles	(United States) Andre Agassi; 3–6, 6–3, 6–2, 6–4	(Russia) Yevgeny Kafelnikov	(United States) Pete Sampras (Sweden) Magnus Norman	(Morocco) Hicham Arazi (United States) Chris Woodruff (Germany) Nicolas Kiefer (Morocco) Younes El Aynaoui
Jan 17; Jan 24	Australian Open; Melbourne, Australia; Grand Slam; Hard – $6,000,000; 128S/64D/32X; Singles – Doubles; Mixed doubles	(South Africa) Ellis Ferreira (United States) Rick Leach; 6–4, 3–6, 6–3, 3–6, 18–16	(Zimbabwe) Wayne Black (Australia) Andrew Kratzmann	(United States) Pete Sampras (Sweden) Magnus Norman	(Morocco) Hicham Arazi (United States) Chris Woodruff (Germany) Nicolas Kiefer (Morocco) Younes El Aynaoui
Jan 17; Jan 24	Australian Open; Melbourne, Australia; Grand Slam; Hard – $6,000,000; 128S/64D/32X; Singles – Doubles; Mixed doubles	(United States) Jared Palmer (Australia) Rennae Stubbs; 7–5, 7–6^{(7–3)}	(Australia) Todd Woodbridge (Spain) Arantxa Sánchez Vicario	(United States) Pete Sampras (Sweden) Magnus Norman	(Morocco) Hicham Arazi (United States) Chris Woodruff (Germany) Nicolas Kiefer (Morocco) Younes El Aynaoui
Jan 31	Davis Cup first round Harare, Zimbabwe – hard (i); Ostrava, Czech Republic – clay (i); Murcia, Spain – clay Moscow, Russia – carpet (i); Bratislava, Slovakia – carpet (i); Florianópolis, Brazil – clay Leipzig, Germany – carpet (i); Geneva, Switzerland – carpet (i)	First-round winners United States 3–2; Czech Republic 4–1; Spain 4–1; Russia 4–1; Slovakia 3–2; Brazil 4–1; Germany 4–1; Australia 3–2	First-round losers Zimbabwe; Great Britain; Italy; Belgium; Austria; France; Netherlands; Switzerland		

=== February ===
Week	Tournament	Champions	Runners-up	Semifinalists	Quarterfinalists
Feb 7	Dubai Tennis Championships; Dubai, United Arab Emirates; ATP International Series; Hard – $1,000,000 – 32S/16D; Singles – Doubles	(Germany) Nicolas Kiefer; 7–5, 4–6, 6–3	(Spain) Juan Carlos Ferrero	(Spain) Albert Costa (Morocco) Karim Alami	(France) Jérôme Golmard (Morocco) Younes El Aynaoui (Spain) Félix Mantilla (Czech Republic) Jiří Novák
Feb 7	Dubai Tennis Championships; Dubai, United Arab Emirates; ATP International Series; Hard – $1,000,000 – 32S/16D; Singles – Doubles	(Czech Republic) Jiří Novák (Czech Republic) David Rikl; 6–2, 7–5	(South Africa) Robbie Koenig (Australia) Peter Tramacchi	(Spain) Albert Costa (Morocco) Karim Alami	(France) Jérôme Golmard (Morocco) Younes El Aynaoui (Spain) Félix Mantilla (Czech Republic) Jiří Novák
Feb 7	Open 13; Marseille, France; ATP International Series; Hard (i) – $500,000 – 32S/16D; Singles – Doubles	(Switzerland) Marc Rosset; 2–6, 6–3, 7–6^{(7–5)}	(Switzerland) Roger Federer	(France) Fabrice Santoro (France) Sébastien Grosjean	(Croatia) Ivan Ljubičić (France) Thierry Guardiola (Sweden) Andreas Vinciguerra (Croatia) Goran Ivanišević
Feb 7	Open 13; Marseille, France; ATP International Series; Hard (i) – $500,000 – 32S/16D; Singles – Doubles	(Sweden) Simon Aspelin (Sweden) Johan Landsberg; 7–6^{(7–2)}, 6–4	(Spain) Juan Ignacio Carrasco (Spain) Jairo Velasco Jr.	(France) Fabrice Santoro (France) Sébastien Grosjean	(Croatia) Ivan Ljubičić (France) Thierry Guardiola (Sweden) Andreas Vinciguerra (Croatia) Goran Ivanišević
Feb 7	Sybase Open; San Jose, United States; ATP International Series; Hard (i) – $375,000 – 32S/16D; Singles – Doubles	(Australia) Mark Philippoussis; 7–5, 4–6, 6–3	(Sweden) Mikael Tillström	(South Africa) Wayne Ferreira (United States) Jim Courier	(Sweden) Magnus Larsson (United States) Michael Chang (United States) Paul Goldstein (United States) Justin Gimelstob
Feb 7	Sybase Open; San Jose, United States; ATP International Series; Hard (i) – $375,000 – 32S/16D; Singles – Doubles	(United States) Jan-Michael Gambill (United States) Scott Humphries; 6–1, 6–4	(Argentina) Lucas Arnold Ker (Philippines) Eric Taino	(South Africa) Wayne Ferreira (United States) Jim Courier	(Sweden) Magnus Larsson (United States) Michael Chang (United States) Paul Goldstein (United States) Justin Gimelstob
Feb 14	Kroger St. Jude International; Memphis, United States; ATP International Series Gold; Hard (i) – $800,000 – 48S/24D; Singles – Doubles	(Sweden) Magnus Larsson; 6–2, 1–6, 6–3	(Zimbabwe) Byron Black	(Brazil) André Sá (Germany) Tommy Haas	(Germany) Rainer Schüttler (Armenia) Sargis Sargsian (United States) Michael Chang (South Africa) Wayne Ferreira
Feb 14	Kroger St. Jude International; Memphis, United States; ATP International Series Gold; Hard (i) – $800,000 – 48S/24D; Singles – Doubles	(United States) Justin Gimelstob (Canada) Sébastien Lareau; 6–2, 6–4	(United States) Jim Grabb (United States) Richey Reneberg	(Brazil) André Sá (Germany) Tommy Haas	(Germany) Rainer Schüttler (Armenia) Sargis Sargsian (United States) Michael Chang (South Africa) Wayne Ferreira
Feb 14	ABN AMRO World Tennis Tournament; Rotterdam, Netherlands; ATP International Series Gold; Hard (i) – $850,000 – 32S/16D; Singles – Doubles	(France) Cédric Pioline; 6–7^{(3–7)}, 6–4, 7–6^{(7–4)}	(United Kingdom) Tim Henman	(Russia) Yevgeny Kafelnikov (France) Jérôme Golmard	(United Kingdom) Greg Rusedski (Slovakia) Dominik Hrbatý (Sweden) Magnus Norman (Germany) Nicolas Kiefer
Feb 14	ABN AMRO World Tennis Tournament; Rotterdam, Netherlands; ATP International Series Gold; Hard (i) – $850,000 – 32S/16D; Singles – Doubles	(South Africa) David Adams (South Africa) John-Laffnie de Jager; 5–7, 6–2, 6–3	(United Kingdom) Tim Henman (Russia) Yevgeny Kafelnikov	(Russia) Yevgeny Kafelnikov (France) Jérôme Golmard	(United Kingdom) Greg Rusedski (Slovakia) Dominik Hrbatý (Sweden) Magnus Norman (Germany) Nicolas Kiefer
Feb 21	AXA Cup; London, United Kingdom; ATP International Series Gold; Hard (i) – $800,000 – 32S/16D; Singles – Doubles	(Switzerland) Marc Rosset; 6–4, 6–4	(Russia) Yevgeny Kafelnikov	(United Kingdom) Greg Rusedski (Sweden) Thomas Enqvist	(France) Fabrice Santoro (Argentina) Mariano Zabaleta (France) Cédric Pioline (Switzerland) Roger Federer
Feb 21	AXA Cup; London, United Kingdom; ATP International Series Gold; Hard (i) – $800,000 – 32S/16D; Singles – Doubles	(South Africa) David Adams (South Africa) John-Laffnie de Jager; 6–3, 6–7^{(7–9)}, 7–6^{(13–11)}	(United States) Jan-Michael Gambill (United States) Scott Humphries	(United Kingdom) Greg Rusedski (Sweden) Thomas Enqvist	(France) Fabrice Santoro (Argentina) Mariano Zabaleta (France) Cédric Pioline (Switzerland) Roger Federer
Feb 21	Abierto Mexicano de Tenis Pegaso; Mexico City, Mexico; ATP International Series Gold; Clay – $800,000 – 32S/16D; Singles – Doubles	(Argentina) Juan Ignacio Chela; 6–4, 7–6^{(7–4)}	(Argentina) Mariano Puerta	(Austria) Stefan Koubek (Argentina) Franco Squillari	(Germany) Markus Hantschk (Argentina) Gastón Gaudio (Argentina) Guillermo Cañas (Ecuador) Nicolás Lapentti
Feb 21	Abierto Mexicano de Tenis Pegaso; Mexico City, Mexico; ATP International Series Gold; Clay – $800,000 – 32S/16D; Singles – Doubles	(Zimbabwe) Byron Black (United States) Donald Johnson; 6–3, 7–5	(Argentina) Gastón Etlis (Argentina) Martín Rodríguez	(Austria) Stefan Koubek (Argentina) Franco Squillari	(Germany) Markus Hantschk (Argentina) Gastón Gaudio (Argentina) Guillermo Cañas (Ecuador) Nicolás Lapentti
Feb 28	Copenhagen Open; Copenhagen, Denmark; ATP International Series; Hard (i) – $350,000 – 32S/16D; Singles – Doubles	(Sweden) Andreas Vinciguerra; 6–3, 7–6^{(7–5)}	(Sweden) Magnus Larsson	(Russia) Marat Safin (Switzerland) Roger Federer	(Sweden) Jonas Björkman (Czech Republic) Martin Damm (Croatia) Ivan Ljubičić (Italy) Gianluca Pozzi
Feb 28	Copenhagen Open; Copenhagen, Denmark; ATP International Series; Hard (i) – $350,000 – 32S/16D; Singles – Doubles	(Czech Republic) Martin Damm (Germany) David Prinosil; 6–1, 5–7, 7–5	(Sweden) Jonas Björkman (Canada) Sébastien Lareau	(Russia) Marat Safin (Switzerland) Roger Federer	(Sweden) Jonas Björkman (Czech Republic) Martin Damm (Croatia) Ivan Ljubičić (Italy) Gianluca Pozzi
Feb 28	Citrix Tennis Championships; Delray Beach, United States; ATP International Series; Hard – $350,000 – 32S2/16D; Singles – Doubles	(Austria) Stefan Koubek; 6–1, 4–6, 6–4	(Spain) Álex Calatrava	(United States) Paul Goldstein (Australia) Richard Fromberg	(Australia) Patrick Rafter (United States) Chris Woodruff (Brazil) André Sá (United States) Justin Gimelstob
Feb 28	Citrix Tennis Championships; Delray Beach, United States; ATP International Series; Hard – $350,000 – 32S2/16D; Singles – Doubles	(United States) Brian MacPhie (Federal Republic of Yugoslavia) Nenad Zimonjić; 7–5, 6–4	(Australia) Joshua Eagle (Australia) Andrew Florent	(United States) Paul Goldstein (Australia) Richard Fromberg	(Australia) Patrick Rafter (United States) Chris Woodruff (Brazil) André Sá (United States) Justin Gimelstob
Feb 28	Chevrolet Cup; Santiago, Chile; ATP International Series; Clay – $375,000 – 32S/16D; Singles – Doubles	(Brazil) Gustavo Kuerten; 7–6^{(7–3)}, 6–3	(Argentina) Mariano Puerta	(Spain) Albert Portas (Argentina) Gastón Gaudio	(Argentina) Agustín Calleri (Argentina) Mariano Hood (Spain) Fernando Vicente (Czech Republic) Bohdan Ulihrach
Feb 28	Chevrolet Cup; Santiago, Chile; ATP International Series; Clay – $375,000 – 32S/16D; Singles – Doubles	(Brazil) Gustavo Kuerten (Brazil) Antonio Prieto; 6–2, 6–4	(South Africa) Lan Bale (South Africa) Piet Norval	(Spain) Albert Portas (Argentina) Gastón Gaudio	(Argentina) Agustín Calleri (Argentina) Mariano Hood (Spain) Fernando Vicente (Czech Republic) Bohdan Ulihrach

=== March ===
Week	Tournament	Champions	Runners-up	Semifinalists	Quarterfinalists
Mar 6	Cerveza Club Colombia Open; Bogotá, Colombia; ATP International Series; Clay – $350,000 – 32S/16D	(Argentina) Mariano Puerta; 6–4, 7–6^{(7–5)}	(Morocco) Younes El Aynaoui	(Brazil) Gustavo Kuerten (Spain) Fernando Vicente	(Germany) Markus Hantschk (Spain) Félix Mantilla (France) Arnaud Di Pasquale (Spain) Albert Portas
Mar 6	Cerveza Club Colombia Open; Bogotá, Colombia; ATP International Series; Clay – $350,000 – 32S/16D	(Argentina) Pablo Albano (Argentina) Lucas Arnold Ker; 7–6^{(7–4)}, 1–6, 6–2	(Spain) Joan Balcells (Colombia) Mauricio Hadad	(Brazil) Gustavo Kuerten (Spain) Fernando Vicente	(Germany) Markus Hantschk (Spain) Félix Mantilla (France) Arnaud Di Pasquale (Spain) Albert Portas
Mar 6	Franklin Templeton Tennis Classic; Scottsdale, United States; ATP International Series; Hard – $375,000 – 32S/16D; Singles – Doubles	(Australia) Lleyton Hewitt; 6–4, 7–6^{(7–2)}	(United Kingdom) Tim Henman	(Spain) Juan Carlos Ferrero (Spain) Albert Costa	(Spain) Francisco Clavet (Chile) Marcelo Ríos (Ecuador) Nicolás Lapentti (Spain) Àlex Corretja
Mar 6	Franklin Templeton Tennis Classic; Scottsdale, United States; ATP International Series; Hard – $375,000 – 32S/16D; Singles – Doubles	(United States) Jared Palmer (United States) Richey Reneberg; 6–3, 7–5	(United States) Patrick Galbraith (Australia) David Macpherson	(Spain) Juan Carlos Ferrero (Spain) Albert Costa	(Spain) Francisco Clavet (Chile) Marcelo Ríos (Ecuador) Nicolás Lapentti (Spain) Àlex Corretja
Mar 13	Tennis Masters Indian Wells; Indian Wells, United States; Tennis Masters Series; Hard – $2,450,000 – 64S/32D; Singles – Doubles	(Spain) Àlex Corretja; 6–4, 6–4, 6–3	(Sweden) Thomas Enqvist	(Ecuador) Nicolás Lapentti (Australia) Mark Philippoussis	(Morocco) Hicham Arazi (Sweden) Magnus Norman (Netherlands) Sjeng Schalken (United States) Pete Sampras
Mar 13	Tennis Masters Indian Wells; Indian Wells, United States; Tennis Masters Series; Hard – $2,450,000 – 64S/32D; Singles – Doubles	(United States) Jared Palmer (United States) Alex O'Brien; 6–4, 7–6^{(7–5)}	(Netherlands) Paul Haarhuis (Australia) Sandon Stolle	(Ecuador) Nicolás Lapentti (Australia) Mark Philippoussis	(Morocco) Hicham Arazi (Sweden) Magnus Norman (Netherlands) Sjeng Schalken (United States) Pete Sampras
Mar 20; Mar 27	Miami Masters; Key Biscayne, United States; Tennis Masters Series; Hard – $2,700,000 – 96S/48D; Singles – Doubles	(United States) Pete Sampras; 6–1, 6–7^{(2–7)}, 7–6^{(7–5)}, 7–6^{(10–8)}	(Brazil) Gustavo Kuerten	(United States) Andre Agassi (Australia) Lleyton Hewitt	(United Kingdom) Tim Henman (South Africa) Wayne Ferreira (United States) Jan-Michael Gambill (Ecuador) Nicolás Lapentti
Mar 20; Mar 27	Miami Masters; Key Biscayne, United States; Tennis Masters Series; Hard – $2,700,000 – 96S/48D; Singles – Doubles	(Australia) Todd Woodbridge (Australia) Mark Woodforde; 6–3, 6–4	(Czech Republic) Martin Damm (Slovakia) Dominik Hrbatý	(United States) Andre Agassi (Australia) Lleyton Hewitt	(United Kingdom) Tim Henman (South Africa) Wayne Ferreira (United States) Jan-Michael Gambill (Ecuador) Nicolás Lapentti

=== April ===
Week	Tournament	Champions	Runners-up	Semifinalists	Quarterfinalists
Apr 3	2000 Davis Cup Quarterfinals; Los Angeles, United States – hard (i); Málaga, Spain – clay Rio de Janeiro, Brazil – clay Adelaide, Australia – grass	Quarterfinals winners United States 3–2; Spain 4–1; Brazil 3–2; Australia 3–2	Quarterfinals losers Czech Republic; Russia; Slovakia; Germany		
Apr 10	2000 Galleryfurniture.com Tennis Challenge; Atlanta, United States; ATP International Series; Clay – $375,000 – 32S/16D	(Australia) Andrew Ilie; 6–3, 7–5	(Australia) Jason Stoltenberg	(United States) Jeff Tarango (United States) Michael Chang	(Czech Republic) Jiří Vaněk (Chile) Nicolás Massú (United States) Chris Woodruff (Austria) Stefan Koubek
Apr 10	2000 Galleryfurniture.com Tennis Challenge; Atlanta, United States; ATP International Series; Clay – $375,000 – 32S/16D	(South Africa) Ellis Ferreira (United States) Rick Leach; 6–3, 6–4	(United States) Justin Gimelstob (The Bahamas) Mark Knowles	(United States) Jeff Tarango (United States) Michael Chang	(Czech Republic) Jiří Vaněk (Chile) Nicolás Massú (United States) Chris Woodruff (Austria) Stefan Koubek
Apr 10	Grand Prix Hassan II; Casablanca, Morocco; ATP International Series; Clay – $350,000 – 32S/16D; Singles – Doubles	(Spain) Fernando Vicente; 6–4, 4–6, 7–6^{(7–3)}	(France) Sébastien Grosjean	(Argentina) Mariano Puerta (France) Arnaud Di Pasquale	(Morocco) Younes El Aynaoui (Spain) Sergi Bruguera (Morocco) Hicham Arazi (Sweden) Andreas Vinciguerra
Apr 10	Grand Prix Hassan II; Casablanca, Morocco; ATP International Series; Clay – $350,000 – 32S/16D; Singles – Doubles	(France) Arnaud Clément (France) Sébastien Grosjean; 7–6^{(7–4)}, 6–2	(Germany) Lars Burgsmüller (Australia) Andrew Painter	(Argentina) Mariano Puerta (France) Arnaud Di Pasquale	(Morocco) Younes El Aynaoui (Spain) Sergi Bruguera (Morocco) Hicham Arazi (Sweden) Andreas Vinciguerra
Apr 10	Estoril Open; Oeiras, Portugal; ATP International Series; Clay – $625,000 – 32S/16D; Singles – Doubles	(Spain) Carlos Moyá; 6–3, 6–2	(Spain) Francisco Clavet	(Ecuador) Nicolás Lapentti (Ukraine) Andrei Medvedev	(France) Nicolas Escudé (Spain) Juan Carlos Ferrero (United Kingdom) Tim Henman (Czech Republic) Bohdan Ulihrach
Apr 10	Estoril Open; Oeiras, Portugal; ATP International Series; Clay – $625,000 – 32S/16D; Singles – Doubles	(United States) Donald Johnson (South Africa) Piet Norval; 6–4, 7–5	(South Africa) David Adams (Australia) Joshua Eagle	(Ecuador) Nicolás Lapentti (Ukraine) Andrei Medvedev	(France) Nicolas Escudé (Spain) Juan Carlos Ferrero (United Kingdom) Tim Henman (Czech Republic) Bohdan Ulihrach
Apr 17	Monte Carlo Open; Roquebrune-Cap-Martin, France; Tennis Masters Series; Clay – $2,450,000 – 64S/32D; Singles – Doubles	(France) Cédric Pioline; 6–4, 7–6^{(7–3)}, 7–6^{(8–6)}	(Slovakia) Dominik Hrbatý	(Argentina) Gastón Gaudio (Morocco) Karim Alami	(Spain) Àlex Corretja (Spain) Juan Carlos Ferrero (Spain) Albert Costa (Slovakia) Karol Kučera
Apr 17	Monte Carlo Open; Roquebrune-Cap-Martin, France; Tennis Masters Series; Clay – $2,450,000 – 64S/32D; Singles – Doubles	(South Africa) Wayne Ferreira (Russia) Yevgeny Kafelnikov; 6–3, 2–6, 6–1	(Netherlands) Paul Haarhuis (Australia) Sandon Stolle	(Argentina) Gastón Gaudio (Morocco) Karim Alami	(Spain) Àlex Corretja (Spain) Juan Carlos Ferrero (Spain) Albert Costa (Slovakia) Karol Kučera
Apr 24	Torneo Godó; Barcelona, Spain; ATP International Series Gold; Clay – $1,000,000 – 56S/28D; Singles – Doubles	(Russia) Marat Safin; 6–3, 6–3, 6–4	(Spain) Juan Carlos Ferrero	(Spain) Carlos Moyá (Sweden) Magnus Norman	(Germany) Tommy Haas (Chile) Marcelo Ríos (Ecuador) Nicolás Lapentti (Morocco) Younes El Aynaoui
Apr 24	Torneo Godó; Barcelona, Spain; ATP International Series Gold; Clay – $1,000,000 – 56S/28D; Singles – Doubles	(Sweden) Nicklas Kulti (Sweden) Mikael Tillström; 6–2, 6–7^{(2–7)}, 7–6^{(7–5)}	(Netherlands) Paul Haarhuis (Australia) Sandon Stolle	(Spain) Carlos Moyá (Sweden) Magnus Norman	(Germany) Tommy Haas (Chile) Marcelo Ríos (Ecuador) Nicolás Lapentti (Morocco) Younes El Aynaoui

=== May ===
Week	Tournament	Champions	Runners-up	Semifinalists	Quarterfinalists
May 1	Majorca Open; Mallorca, Spain; ATP International Series; Clay – $500,000 – 32S/16D; Singles – Doubles	(Russia) Marat Safin; 6–4, 6–3	(Sweden) Mikael Tillström	(Spain) Galo Blanco (Argentina) Mariano Puerta	(Argentina) Juan Ignacio Chela (Spain) Carlos Moyá (Spain) Alberto Martín (Spain) Albert Portas
May 1	Majorca Open; Mallorca, Spain; ATP International Series; Clay – $500,000 – 32S/16D; Singles – Doubles	(France) Michaël Llodra (Italy) Diego Nargiso; 7–6^{(7–2)}, 7–6^{(7–3)}	(Spain) Alberto Martín (Spain) Fernando Vicente	(Spain) Galo Blanco (Argentina) Mariano Puerta	(Argentina) Juan Ignacio Chela (Spain) Carlos Moyá (Spain) Alberto Martín (Spain) Albert Portas
May 1	BMW Open; Munich, Germany; ATP International Series; Clay – $400,000 – 32S/16D; Singles – Doubles	(Argentina) Franco Squillari; 6–4, 6–4	(Germany) Tommy Haas	(Sweden) Thomas Enqvist (Belarus) Max Mirnyi	(Czech Republic) Jiří Novák (Argentina) Federico Browne (Brazil) Fernando Meligeni (Morocco) Younes El Aynaoui
May 1	BMW Open; Munich, Germany; ATP International Series; Clay – $400,000 – 32S/16D; Singles – Doubles	(South Africa) David Adams (South Africa) John-Laffnie de Jager; 6–4, 6–4	(Belarus) Max Mirnyi (Federal Republic of Yugoslavia) Nenad Zimonjić	(Sweden) Thomas Enqvist (Belarus) Max Mirnyi	(Czech Republic) Jiří Novák (Argentina) Federico Browne (Brazil) Fernando Meligeni (Morocco) Younes El Aynaoui
May 1	U.S. Men's Clay Court Championships; Orlando, United States; ATP International Series; Clay – $350,000 – 32S/16D; Singles – Doubles	(Chile) Fernando González; 6–2, 6–3	(Chile) Nicolás Massú	(Argentina) Martín Rodríguez (Paraguay) Ramón Delgado	(Thailand) Paradorn Srichaphan (Czech Republic) Jiří Vaněk (Italy) Gianluca Pozzi (Germany) Markus Hantschk
May 1	U.S. Men's Clay Court Championships; Orlando, United States; ATP International Series; Clay – $350,000 – 32S/16D; Singles – Doubles	(India) Leander Paes (Netherlands) Jan Siemerink; 6–3, 6–4	(United States) Justin Gimelstob (Canada) Sébastien Lareau	(Argentina) Martín Rodríguez (Paraguay) Ramón Delgado	(Thailand) Paradorn Srichaphan (Czech Republic) Jiří Vaněk (Italy) Gianluca Pozzi (Germany) Markus Hantschk
May 8	Rome Masters; Rome, Italy; Tennis Masters Series; Clay – $2,450,000 – 64S/32D; Singles – Doubles	(Sweden) Magnus Norman; 6–3, 4–6, 6–4, 6–4	(Brazil) Gustavo Kuerten	(Spain) Àlex Corretja (Australia) Lleyton Hewitt	(Slovakia) Dominik Hrbatý (Spain) Albert Costa (Spain) Félix Mantilla (Argentina) Mariano Puerta
May 8	Rome Masters; Rome, Italy; Tennis Masters Series; Clay – $2,450,000 – 64S/32D; Singles – Doubles	(Czech Republic) Martin Damm (Slovakia) Dominik Hrbatý; 6–4, 4–6, 6–3	(South Africa) Wayne Ferreira (Russia) Yevgeny Kafelnikov	(Spain) Àlex Corretja (Australia) Lleyton Hewitt	(Slovakia) Dominik Hrbatý (Spain) Albert Costa (Spain) Félix Mantilla (Argentina) Mariano Puerta
May 15	Hamburg Masters; Hamburg, Germany; Tennis Masters Series; Clay – $2,450,000 – 64S/32D; Singles – Doubles	(Brazil) Gustavo Kuerten; 6–4, 5–7, 6–4, 5–7, 7–6^{(7–3)}	(Russia) Marat Safin	(Romania) Andrei Pavel (Chile) Marcelo Ríos	(Argentina) Mariano Zabaleta (Sweden) Magnus Norman (France) Cédric Pioline (Spain) Francisco Clavet
May 15	Hamburg Masters; Hamburg, Germany; Tennis Masters Series; Clay – $2,450,000 – 64S/32D; Singles – Doubles	(Australia) Todd Woodbridge (Australia) Mark Woodforde; 6–7^{(4–7)}, 6–4, 6–3	(Australia) Wayne Arthurs (Australia) Sandon Stolle	(Romania) Andrei Pavel (Chile) Marcelo Ríos	(Argentina) Mariano Zabaleta (Sweden) Magnus Norman (France) Cédric Pioline (Spain) Francisco Clavet
May 22	Peugeot ATP World Team Championship; Düsseldorf, Germany; ATP World Team Championship; Clay – $1,900,000 – 8 teams (RR)	Slovakia; 3–0	Russia	Round-robin losers (Red group); Sweden; United States; Germany	Round-robin losers (Blue group); Australia; Spain; Chile
May 22	Internationaler Raiffeisen Grand Prix; Sankt Pölten, Austria; ATP International Series; Clay – $425,000 – 32S/16D	(Romania) Andrei Pavel; 7–5, 3–6, 6–2	(Australia) Andrew Ilie	(Spain) Albert Portas (Costa Rica) Juan Antonio Marín	(Spain) Galo Blanco (Ukraine) Andrei Medvedev (Austria) Markus Hipfl (United States) Jeff Tarango
May 22	Internationaler Raiffeisen Grand Prix; Sankt Pölten, Austria; ATP International Series; Clay – $425,000 – 32S/16D	(India) Mahesh Bhupathi (Australia) Andrew Kratzmann; 7–6^{(12–10)}, 6–7^{(2–7)}, 6–4	(Italy) Andrea Gaudenzi (Italy) Diego Nargiso	(Spain) Albert Portas (Costa Rica) Juan Antonio Marín	(Spain) Galo Blanco (Ukraine) Andrei Medvedev (Austria) Markus Hipfl (United States) Jeff Tarango
May 29; Jun 5	French Open; Paris, France; Grand Slam; Clay – $4,526,942; 128S/64D/48X; Singles – Doubles; Mixed doubles	(Brazil) Gustavo Kuerten; 6–2, 6–3, 2–6, 7–6^{(8–6)}	(Sweden) Magnus Norman	(Argentina) Franco Squillari (Spain) Juan Carlos Ferrero	(Spain) Albert Costa (Russia) Marat Safin (Russia) Yevgeny Kafelnikov (Spain) Àlex Corretja
May 29; Jun 5	French Open; Paris, France; Grand Slam; Clay – $4,526,942; 128S/64D/48X; Singles – Doubles; Mixed doubles	(Australia) Todd Woodbridge (Australia) Mark Woodforde; 7–6^{(9–7)}, 6–4	(Netherlands) Paul Haarhuis (Australia) Sandon Stolle	(Argentina) Franco Squillari (Spain) Juan Carlos Ferrero	(Spain) Albert Costa (Russia) Marat Safin (Russia) Yevgeny Kafelnikov (Spain) Àlex Corretja
May 29; Jun 5	French Open; Paris, France; Grand Slam; Clay – $4,526,942; 128S/64D/48X; Singles – Doubles; Mixed doubles	(South Africa) David Adams (South Africa) Mariaan de Swardt; 6–3, 3–6, 6–3	(Australia) Todd Woodbridge (Australia) Rennae Stubbs	(Argentina) Franco Squillari (Spain) Juan Carlos Ferrero	(Spain) Albert Costa (Russia) Marat Safin (Russia) Yevgeny Kafelnikov (Spain) Àlex Corretja

=== June ===
Week	Tournament	Champions	Runners-up	Semifinalists	Quarterfinalists
Jun 12	Gerry Weber Open; Halle, Germany; ATP International Series; Grass – $1,000,000 – 32S/16D; Singles – Doubles	(Germany) David Prinosil; 6–3, 6–2	(Netherlands) Richard Krajicek	(Russia) Yevgeny Kafelnikov (United States) Michael Chang	(France) Nicolas Escudé (Ecuador) Nicolás Lapentti (Switzerland) Roger Federer (Germany) Nicolas Kiefer
Jun 12	Gerry Weber Open; Halle, Germany; ATP International Series; Grass – $1,000,000 – 32S/16D; Singles – Doubles	(Sweden) Nicklas Kulti (Sweden) Mikael Tillström; 7–6^{(7–4)}, 7–6^{(7–4)}	(India) Mahesh Bhupathi (Germany) David Prinosil	(Russia) Yevgeny Kafelnikov (United States) Michael Chang	(France) Nicolas Escudé (Ecuador) Nicolás Lapentti (Switzerland) Roger Federer (Germany) Nicolas Kiefer
Jun 12	Stella Artois Championships; London, United Kingdom; ATP International Series; Grass – $800,000 – 56S/28D; Singles – Doubles	(Australia) Lleyton Hewitt; 6–4, 6–4	(United States) Pete Sampras	(Italy) Gianluca Pozzi (Italy) Davide Sanguinetti	(Russia) Marat Safin (France) Cédric Pioline (Romania) Andrei Pavel (United States) Bob Bryan
Jun 12	Stella Artois Championships; London, United Kingdom; ATP International Series; Grass – $800,000 – 56S/28D; Singles – Doubles	(Australia) Todd Woodbridge (Australia) Mark Woodforde; 6–7^{(5–7)}, 6–3, 7–6^{(7–1)}	(United States) Jonathan Stark (Philippines) Eric Taino	(Italy) Gianluca Pozzi (Italy) Davide Sanguinetti	(Russia) Marat Safin (France) Cédric Pioline (Romania) Andrei Pavel (United States) Bob Bryan
Jun 19	Heineken Trophy 's-Hertogenbosch, Netherlands; ATP International Series; Grass – $400,000 – 32S/16D; Singles – Doubles	(Australia) Patrick Rafter; 6–1, 6–3	(France) Nicolas Escudé	(Czech Republic) Martin Damm (United States) Michael Chang	(Sweden) Magnus Gustafsson (Morocco) Karim Alami (Germany) Karsten Braasch (Spain) Francisco Clavet
Jun 19	Heineken Trophy 's-Hertogenbosch, Netherlands; ATP International Series; Grass – $400,000 – 32S/16D; Singles – Doubles	(Czech Republic) Martin Damm (Czech Republic) Cyril Suk; 6–4, 6–7^{(5–7)}, 7–6^{(7–5)}	(Netherlands) Paul Haarhuis (Australia) Sandon Stolle	(Czech Republic) Martin Damm (United States) Michael Chang	(Sweden) Magnus Gustafsson (Morocco) Karim Alami (Germany) Karsten Braasch (Spain) Francisco Clavet
Jun 19	Nottingham Open; Nottingham, United Kingdom; ATP International Series; Grass – $375,000 – 32S/16D; Singles – Doubles	(France) Sébastien Grosjean; 7–6^{(9–7)}, 6–3	(Zimbabwe) Byron Black	(United States) Jan-Michael Gambill (Sweden) Jonas Björkman	(United Kingdom) Arvind Parmar (Italy) Gianluca Pozzi (South Africa) Wayne Ferreira (Australia) Richard Fromberg
Jun 19	Nottingham Open; Nottingham, United Kingdom; ATP International Series; Grass – $375,000 – 32S/16D; Singles – Doubles	(United States) Donald Johnson (South Africa) Piet Norval; 1–6, 6–4, 6–3	(South Africa) Ellis Ferreira (United States) Rick Leach	(United States) Jan-Michael Gambill (Sweden) Jonas Björkman	(United Kingdom) Arvind Parmar (Italy) Gianluca Pozzi (South Africa) Wayne Ferreira (Australia) Richard Fromberg
Jun 26; Jul 3	Wimbledon Championships; London, United Kingdom; Grand Slam; Grass – $6,000,000; 128S/64D/64X; Singles – Doubles; Mixed doubles	(United States) Pete Sampras; 6–7^{(10–12)}, 7–6^{(7–5)}, 6–4, 6–2	(Australia) Patrick Rafter	(Belarus) Vladimir Voltchkov (United States) Andre Agassi	(United States) Jan-Michael Gambill (Zimbabwe) Byron Black (Germany) Alexander Popp (Australia) Mark Philippoussis
Jun 26; Jul 3	Wimbledon Championships; London, United Kingdom; Grand Slam; Grass – $6,000,000; 128S/64D/64X; Singles – Doubles; Mixed doubles	(Australia) Todd Woodbridge (Australia) Mark Woodforde; 6–3, 6–4, 6–1	(Netherlands) Paul Haarhuis (Australia) Sandon Stolle	(Belarus) Vladimir Voltchkov (United States) Andre Agassi	(United States) Jan-Michael Gambill (Zimbabwe) Byron Black (Germany) Alexander Popp (Australia) Mark Philippoussis
Jun 26; Jul 3	Wimbledon Championships; London, United Kingdom; Grand Slam; Grass – $6,000,000; 128S/64D/64X; Singles – Doubles; Mixed doubles	(United States) Donald Johnson (United States) Kimberly Po; 6–4, 7–6^{(7–3)}	(Australia) Lleyton Hewitt (Belgium) Kim Clijsters	(Belarus) Vladimir Voltchkov (United States) Andre Agassi	(United States) Jan-Michael Gambill (Zimbabwe) Byron Black (Germany) Alexander Popp (Australia) Mark Philippoussis

=== July ===
Week	Tournament	Champions	Runners-up	Semifinalists	Quarterfinalists
Jul 10	Wideyes Swedish Open; Båstad, Sweden; ATP International Series; Clay – $375,000 – 32S/16D; Singles – Doubles	(Sweden) Magnus Norman; 6–1, 7–6^{(8–6)}	(Sweden) Andreas Vinciguerra	(Croatia) Ivan Ljubičić (Austria) Markus Hipfl	(Chile) Nicolás Massú (Spain) Albert Portas (United States) Jeff Tarango (Sweden) Magnus Gustafsson
Jul 10	Wideyes Swedish Open; Båstad, Sweden; ATP International Series; Clay – $375,000 – 32S/16D; Singles – Doubles	(Sweden) Nicklas Kulti (Sweden) Mikael Tillström; 4–6, 6–2, 6–3	(Italy) Andrea Gaudenzi (Italy) Diego Nargiso	(Croatia) Ivan Ljubičić (Austria) Markus Hipfl	(Chile) Nicolás Massú (Spain) Albert Portas (United States) Jeff Tarango (Sweden) Magnus Gustafsson
Jul 10	UBS Open Gstaad; Gstaad, Switzerland; ATP International Series; Clay – $600,000 – 32S/16D; Singles – Doubles	(Spain) Àlex Corretja; 6–1, 6–3	(Argentina) Mariano Puerta	(Argentina) Gastón Gaudio (Spain) Albert Costa	(Chile) Marcelo Ríos (Argentina) Franco Squillari (Czech Republic) Jiří Novák (France) Sébastien Grosjean
Jul 10	UBS Open Gstaad; Gstaad, Switzerland; ATP International Series; Clay – $600,000 – 32S/16D; Singles – Doubles	(Czech Republic) Jiří Novák (Czech Republic) David Rikl; 3–6, 6–3, 6–4	(France) Jérôme Golmard (Germany) Michael Kohlmann	(Argentina) Gastón Gaudio (Spain) Albert Costa	(Chile) Marcelo Ríos (Argentina) Franco Squillari (Czech Republic) Jiří Novák (France) Sébastien Grosjean
Jul 10	Hall of Fame Tennis Championships; Newport, United States; ATP International Series; Grass – $375,000 – 32S/31Q/16D/4Q; Singles – Doubles	(Netherlands) Peter Wessels; 7–6^{(7–3)}, 6–3	(Germany) Jens Knippschild	(Australia) Wayne Arthurs (Australia) Jason Stoltenberg	(United States) Mardy Fish (Sweden) Jonas Björkman (United States) Paul Goldstein (Australia) Scott Draper
Jul 10	Hall of Fame Tennis Championships; Newport, United States; ATP International Series; Grass – $375,000 – 32S/31Q/16D/4Q; Singles – Doubles	(Israel) Jonathan Erlich (Israel) Harel Levy; 7–6^{(7–2)}, 7–5	(United Kingdom) Kyle Spencer (United States) Mitch Sprengelmeyer	(Australia) Wayne Arthurs (Australia) Jason Stoltenberg	(United States) Mardy Fish (Sweden) Jonas Björkman (United States) Paul Goldstein (Australia) Scott Draper
Jul 10	Davis Cup Semifinals – Bottom Half; Brisbane, Australia – grass	Semifinals winners Australia 5–0	Semifinals losers Brazil		
Jul 17	Energis Dutch Open; Amsterdam, Netherlands; ATP International Series; Clay – $400,000 – 32S/16D; Singles – Doubles	(Sweden) Magnus Gustafsson; 6–7^{(4–7)}, 6–3, 7–6^{(7–5)}, 6–1	(Netherlands) Raemon Sluiter	(Netherlands) Edwin Kempes (Russia) Nikolay Davydenko	(Norway) Christian Ruud (Chile) Nicolás Massú (Spain) Álex Calatrava (Germany) Tomas Behrend
Jul 17	Energis Dutch Open; Amsterdam, Netherlands; ATP International Series; Clay – $400,000 – 32S/16D; Singles – Doubles	(Argentina) Sergio Roitman (Argentina) Andrés Schneiter; 4–6, 6–4, 6–1	(Netherlands) Edwin Kempes (Netherlands) Dennis van Scheppingen	(Netherlands) Edwin Kempes (Russia) Nikolay Davydenko	(Norway) Christian Ruud (Chile) Nicolás Massú (Spain) Álex Calatrava (Germany) Tomas Behrend
Jul 17	Mercedes Cup; Stuttgart, Germany; ATP International Series Gold; Clay – $1,000,000 – 32S/16D; Singles – Doubles	(Argentina) Franco Squillari; 6–2, 3–6, 4–6, 6–4, 6–2	(Argentina) Gastón Gaudio	(Germany) Daniel Elsner (Australia) Andrew Ilie	(Czech Republic) Jiří Novák (Slovakia) Karol Kučera (Germany) Rainer Schüttler (Ukraine) Andrei Medvedev
Jul 17	Mercedes Cup; Stuttgart, Germany; ATP International Series Gold; Clay – $1,000,000 – 32S/16D; Singles – Doubles	(Czech Republic) Jiří Novák (Czech Republic) David Rikl; 5–7, 6–2, 6–3	(Argentina) Lucas Arnold Ker (United States) Donald Johnson	(Germany) Daniel Elsner (Australia) Andrew Ilie	(Czech Republic) Jiří Novák (Slovakia) Karol Kučera (Germany) Rainer Schüttler (Ukraine) Andrei Medvedev
Jul 17	Croatia Open; Umag, Croatia; ATP International Series; Clay – $400,000 – 32S/16D; Singles – Doubles	(Chile) Marcelo Ríos; 7–6^{(7–1)}, 4–6, 6–3	(Argentina) Mariano Puerta	(Czech Republic) Bohdan Ulihrach (Spain) Carlos Moyá	(Czech Republic) Martin Damm (Spain) Alberto Martín (Spain) Roberto Carretero (Spain) David Sánchez
Jul 17	Croatia Open; Umag, Croatia; ATP International Series; Clay – $400,000 – 32S/16D; Singles – Doubles	(Spain) Álex López Morón (Spain) Albert Portas; 6–1, 7–6^{(7–2)}	(Croatia) Ivan Ljubičić (Croatia) Lovro Zovko	(Czech Republic) Bohdan Ulihrach (Spain) Carlos Moyá	(Czech Republic) Martin Damm (Spain) Alberto Martín (Spain) Roberto Carretero (Spain) David Sánchez
Jul 17	Davis Cup Semifinals – Top Half; Santander, Spain – clay	Semifinals winners Spain 5–0	Semifinals losers United States		
Jul 24	Generali Open; Kitzbühel, Austria; ATP International Series Gold; Clay – $750,000 – 48S/24D; Singles – Doubles	(Spain) Àlex Corretja; 6–3, 6–1, 3–0 retired	(Spain) Emilio Benfele Álvarez	(Spain) Francisco Clavet (Argentina) Agustín Calleri	(Russia) Yevgeny Kafelnikov (Ecuador) Nicolás Lapentti (Spain) Alberto Martín (Argentina) Mariano Zabaleta
Jul 24	Generali Open; Kitzbühel, Austria; ATP International Series Gold; Clay – $750,000 – 48S/24D; Singles – Doubles	(Argentina) Pablo Albano (Czech Republic) Cyril Suk; 6–3, 3–6, 6–3	(Australia) Joshua Eagle (Australia) Andrew Florent	(Spain) Francisco Clavet (Argentina) Agustín Calleri	(Russia) Yevgeny Kafelnikov (Ecuador) Nicolás Lapentti (Spain) Alberto Martín (Argentina) Mariano Zabaleta
Jul 24	Mercedes-Benz Cup; Los Angeles, United States; ATP International Series; Hard – $375,000 – 32S/16D; Singles – Doubles	(United States) Michael Chang; 6–7^{(2–7)}, 6–3 retired	(United States) Jan-Michael Gambill	(France) Arnaud Clément (United States) Justin Gimelstob	(France) Lionel Roux (Australia) Jason Stoltenberg (South Africa) Wayne Ferreira (United States) Paul Goldstein
Jul 24	Mercedes-Benz Cup; Los Angeles, United States; ATP International Series; Hard – $375,000 – 32S/16D; Singles – Doubles	(Australia) Paul Kilderry (Australia) Sandon Stolle walkover	(United States) Jan-Michael Gambill (United States) Scott Humphries	(France) Arnaud Clément (United States) Justin Gimelstob	(France) Lionel Roux (Australia) Jason Stoltenberg (South Africa) Wayne Ferreira (United States) Paul Goldstein
Jul 24	Internazionali di Tennis di San Marino; City of San Marino, San Marino; ATP International Series; Clay – $325,000 – 32S/16D; Singles – Doubles	(Spain) Álex Calatrava; 7–6^{(9–7)}, 1–6, 6–4	(Spain) Sergi Bruguera	(Italy) Diego Nargiso (Ukraine) Andrei Medvedev	(Spain) Julián Alonso (Morocco) Karim Alami (Netherlands) Jan Siemerink (Czech Republic) Jiří Vaněk
Jul 24	Internazionali di Tennis di San Marino; City of San Marino, San Marino; ATP International Series; Clay – $325,000 – 32S/16D; Singles – Doubles	(Czech Republic) Tomáš Cibulec (Czech Republic) Leoš Friedl; 7–6^{(7–1)}, 7–5	(Argentina) Gastón Etlis (United States) Jack Waite	(Italy) Diego Nargiso (Ukraine) Andrei Medvedev	(Spain) Julián Alonso (Morocco) Karim Alami (Netherlands) Jan Siemerink (Czech Republic) Jiří Vaněk
Jul 31	du Maurier Open; Toronto, Ontario, Canada; Tennis Masters Series; Hard – $2,450,000 – 64S/32Q/32D/8Q; Singles – Doubles	(Russia) Marat Safin; 6–2, 6–3	(Israel) Harel Levy	(Czech Republic) Jiří Novák (South Africa) Wayne Ferreira	(France) Jérôme Golmard (Australia) Patrick Rafter (Russia) Yevgeny Kafelnikov (United States) Pete Sampras
Jul 31	du Maurier Open; Toronto, Ontario, Canada; Tennis Masters Series; Hard – $2,450,000 – 64S/32Q/32D/8Q; Singles – Doubles	(Canada) Sébastien Lareau (Canada) Daniel Nestor; 6–3, 7–6^{(7–3)}	(Australia) Joshua Eagle (Australia) Andrew Florent	(Czech Republic) Jiří Novák (South Africa) Wayne Ferreira	(France) Jérôme Golmard (Australia) Patrick Rafter (Russia) Yevgeny Kafelnikov (United States) Pete Sampras

=== August ===
Week	Tournament	Champions	Runners-up	Semifinalists	Quarterfinalists
Aug 7	Cincinnati Masters; Mason, United States; Tennis Masters Series; Hard – $2,450,000 – 64S/32D; Singles – Doubles	(Sweden) Thomas Enqvist; 7–6^{(7–5)}, 6–4	(United Kingdom) Tim Henman	(France) Arnaud Clément (Brazil) Gustavo Kuerten	(Spain) Fernando Vicente (Argentina) Franco Squillari (United States) Todd Martin (France) Fabrice Santoro
Aug 7	Cincinnati Masters; Mason, United States; Tennis Masters Series; Hard – $2,450,000 – 64S/32D; Singles – Doubles	(Australia) Todd Woodbridge (Australia) Mark Woodforde; 7–6^{(8–6)}, 6–4	(South Africa) Ellis Ferreira (United States) Rick Leach	(France) Arnaud Clément (Brazil) Gustavo Kuerten	(Spain) Fernando Vicente (Argentina) Franco Squillari (United States) Todd Martin (France) Fabrice Santoro
Aug 14	RCA Championships; Indianapolis, United States; ATP International Series Gold; Hard – $800,000 – 48S/28D; Singles – Doubles	(Brazil) Gustavo Kuerten; 3–6, 7–6^{(7–2)}, 7–6^{(7–2)}	(Russia) Marat Safin	(Australia) Lleyton Hewitt (United Kingdom) Tim Henman	(South Africa) Wayne Ferreira (Sweden) Thomas Enqvist (France) Sébastien Grosjean (Russia) Yevgeny Kafelnikov
Aug 14	RCA Championships; Indianapolis, United States; ATP International Series Gold; Hard – $800,000 – 48S/28D; Singles – Doubles	(Australia) Lleyton Hewitt (Australia) Sandon Stolle; 6–2, 3–6, 6–3	(Sweden) Jonas Björkman (Belarus) Max Mirnyi	(Australia) Lleyton Hewitt (United Kingdom) Tim Henman	(South Africa) Wayne Ferreira (Sweden) Thomas Enqvist (France) Sébastien Grosjean (Russia) Yevgeny Kafelnikov
Aug 14	Legg Mason Tennis Classic; Washington, United States; ATP International Series Gold; Hard – $800,000 – 48S/28D; Singles – Doubles	(Spain) Àlex Corretja; 6–2, 6–3	(United States) Andre Agassi	(Germany) David Prinosil (Germany) Nicolas Kiefer	(United States) Andy Roddick (Zimbabwe) Byron Black (United States) Jan-Michael Gambill (Australia) Wayne Arthurs
Aug 14	Legg Mason Tennis Classic; Washington, United States; ATP International Series Gold; Hard – $800,000 – 48S/28D; Singles – Doubles	(United States) Alex O'Brien (United States) Jared Palmer; 7–5, 6–1	(United States) Andre Agassi (Armenia) Sargis Sargsian	(Germany) David Prinosil (Germany) Nicolas Kiefer	(United States) Andy Roddick (Zimbabwe) Byron Black (United States) Jan-Michael Gambill (Australia) Wayne Arthurs
Aug 21	Waldbaum's Hamlet Cup; Long Island, United States; ATP International Series; Hard – $415,200 – 48S/16D	(Sweden) Magnus Norman; 6–3, 5–7, 7–5	(Sweden) Thomas Enqvist	(Netherlands) Richard Krajicek (France) Arnaud Clément	(Morocco) Younes El Aynaoui (Spain) Carlos Moyá (France) Fabrice Santoro (United States) Michael Chang
Aug 21	Waldbaum's Hamlet Cup; Long Island, United States; ATP International Series; Hard – $415,200 – 48S/16D	(United States) Jonathan Stark (Zimbabwe) Kevin Ullyett; 6–4, 6–4	(United States) Jan-Michael Gambill (United States) Scott Humphries	(Netherlands) Richard Krajicek (France) Arnaud Clément	(Morocco) Younes El Aynaoui (Spain) Carlos Moyá (France) Fabrice Santoro (United States) Michael Chang
Aug 28; Sep 4	US Open; New York City, United States; Grand Slam; Hard – $6,834,415; 128S/128Q/64D//32X; Singles – Doubles; Mixed doubles	(Russia) Marat Safin; 6–4, 6–3, 6–3	(United States) Pete Sampras	(Australia) Lleyton Hewitt (United States) Todd Martin	(France) Arnaud Clément (Netherlands) Richard Krajicek (Germany) Nicolas Kiefer (Sweden) Thomas Johansson
Aug 28; Sep 4	US Open; New York City, United States; Grand Slam; Hard – $6,834,415; 128S/128Q/64D//32X; Singles – Doubles; Mixed doubles	(Australia) Lleyton Hewitt (Belarus) Max Mirnyi; 6–4, 5–7, 7–6^{(7–5)}	(South Africa) Ellis Ferreira (United States) Rick Leach	(Australia) Lleyton Hewitt (United States) Todd Martin	(France) Arnaud Clément (Netherlands) Richard Krajicek (Germany) Nicolas Kiefer (Sweden) Thomas Johansson
Aug 28; Sep 4	US Open; New York City, United States; Grand Slam; Hard – $6,834,415; 128S/128Q/64D//32X; Singles – Doubles; Mixed doubles	(United States) Jared Palmer (Spain) Arantxa Sánchez Vicario; 6–4, 6–3	(Belarus) Max Mirnyi (Russia) Anna Kournikova	(Australia) Lleyton Hewitt (United States) Todd Martin	(France) Arnaud Clément (Netherlands) Richard Krajicek (Germany) Nicolas Kiefer (Sweden) Thomas Johansson

=== September ===
Week	Tournament	Champions	Runners-up	Semifinalists	Quarterfinalists
Sep 11	Gelsor Open Romania; Bucharest, Romania; ATP International Series; Clay – $375,000 – 32S/16D; Singles – Doubles	(Spain) Joan Balcells; 6–4, 3–6, 7–6^{(7–1)}	(Germany) Markus Hantschk	(Germany) Marc-Kevin Goellner (Spain) Álex Calatrava	(Spain) Albert Portas (Spain) Galo Blanco (Spain) Alberto Martín (Brazil) Fernando Meligeni
Sep 11	Gelsor Open Romania; Bucharest, Romania; ATP International Series; Clay – $375,000 – 32S/16D; Singles – Doubles	(Spain) Alberto Martín (Israel) Eyal Ran; 7–6^{(7–4)}, 6–1	(United States) Devin Bowen (Argentina) Mariano Hood	(Germany) Marc-Kevin Goellner (Spain) Álex Calatrava	(Spain) Albert Portas (Spain) Galo Blanco (Spain) Alberto Martín (Brazil) Fernando Meligeni
Sep 11	President's Cup; Tashkent, Uzbekistan; ATP International Series; Hard – $525,000 – 32S/16D; Singles – Doubles	(Russia) Marat Safin; 6–3, 6–4	(Italy) Davide Sanguinetti	(France) Julien Boutter (Switzerland) George Bastl	(United States) Justin Gimelstob (France) Jérôme Golmard (Russia) Andrei Stoliarov (United Kingdom) Jamie Delgado
Sep 11	President's Cup; Tashkent, Uzbekistan; ATP International Series; Hard – $525,000 – 32S/16D; Singles – Doubles	(United States) Justin Gimelstob (United States) Scott Humphries; 6–3, 6–2	(South Africa) Marius Barnard (South Africa) Robbie Koenig	(France) Julien Boutter (Switzerland) George Bastl	(United States) Justin Gimelstob (France) Jérôme Golmard (Russia) Andrei Stoliarov (United Kingdom) Jamie Delgado
Sep 18	Summer Olympics; Sydney, Australia; Olympic Games; Hard – 64S/29D; Singles – Doubles	Gold	Silver	Bronze	Quarterfinalists
Sep 18	Summer Olympics; Sydney, Australia; Olympic Games; Hard – 64S/29D; Singles – Doubles	(Russia) Yevgeny Kafelnikov; 7–6^{(7–4)}, 3–6, 6–2, 4–6, 6–3	(Germany) Tommy Haas	(France) Arnaud Di Pasquale; 7–6^{(7–5)}, 6–7^{(7–9)}, 6–3 Fourth place (Switzerland) Roger Federer	(Morocco) Karim Alami (Belarus) Max Mirnyi (Spain) Juan Carlos Ferrero (Brazil) Gustavo Kuerten
Sep 18	Summer Olympics; Sydney, Australia; Olympic Games; Hard – 64S/29D; Singles – Doubles	(Canada) Sébastien Lareau (Canada) Daniel Nestor; 5–7, 6–3, 6–4, 7–6^{(7–2)}	(Australia) Todd Woodbridge (Australia) Mark Woodforde	(France) Arnaud Di Pasquale; 7–6^{(7–5)}, 6–7^{(7–9)}, 6–3 Fourth place (Switzerland) Roger Federer	(Morocco) Karim Alami (Belarus) Max Mirnyi (Spain) Juan Carlos Ferrero (Brazil) Gustavo Kuerten
Sep 25	Campionati Internazionali di Sicilia; Palermo, Italy; ATP International Series; Clay – $375,000 – 32S/16D; Singles – Doubles	(Belgium) Olivier Rochus; 7–6^{(16–14)}, 6–1	(Italy) Diego Nargiso	(Belgium) Christophe Rochus (Spain) Sergi Bruguera	(Spain) David Sánchez (Spain) Joan Balcells (Spain) Alberto Martín (France) Stéphane Huet
Sep 25	Campionati Internazionali di Sicilia; Palermo, Italy; ATP International Series; Clay – $375,000 – 32S/16D; Singles – Doubles	(Spain) Tomás Carbonell (Argentina) Martín García walkover	(Argentina) Pablo Albano (Germany) Marc-Kevin Goellner	(Belgium) Christophe Rochus (Spain) Sergi Bruguera	(Spain) David Sánchez (Spain) Joan Balcells (Spain) Alberto Martín (France) Stéphane Huet

=== October ===
Week	Tournament	Champions	Runners-up	Semifinalists	Quarterfinalists
Oct 2	Salem Open; Hong Kong SAR; ATP International Series; Hard – $375,000 – 32S/16D	(Germany) Nicolas Kiefer; 7–6^{(7–4)}, 2–6, 6–2	(Australia) Mark Philippoussis	(Australia) Patrick Rafter (United Kingdom) Tim Henman	(Brazil) Gustavo Kuerten (Spain) Sergi Bruguera (Ecuador) Nicolás Lapentti (United States) Michael Chang
Oct 2	Salem Open; Hong Kong SAR; ATP International Series; Hard – $375,000 – 32S/16D	(Zimbabwe) Wayne Black (Zimbabwe) Kevin Ullyett; 6–1, 6–2	(Slovakia) Dominik Hrbatý (Germany) David Prinosil	(Australia) Patrick Rafter (United Kingdom) Tim Henman	(Brazil) Gustavo Kuerten (Spain) Sergi Bruguera (Ecuador) Nicolás Lapentti (United States) Michael Chang
Oct 9	Japan Open Tennis Championships; Tokyo, Japan; ATP International Series Gold; Hard – $800,000 – 56S/28D	(Netherlands) Sjeng Schalken; 6–4, 3–6, 6–1	(Ecuador) Nicolás Lapentti	(Slovakia) Dominik Hrbatý (Morocco) Hicham Arazi	(Brazil) Gustavo Kuerten (Zimbabwe) Byron Black (Australia) Mark Philippoussis (Zimbabwe) Wayne Black
Oct 9	Japan Open Tennis Championships; Tokyo, Japan; ATP International Series Gold; Hard – $800,000 – 56S/28D	(India) Mahesh Bhupathi (India) Leander Paes; 6–4, 6–7^{(1–7)}, 6–3	(Australia) Michael Hill (United States) Jeff Tarango	(Slovakia) Dominik Hrbatý (Morocco) Hicham Arazi	(Brazil) Gustavo Kuerten (Zimbabwe) Byron Black (Australia) Mark Philippoussis (Zimbabwe) Wayne Black
Oct 9	CA-TennisTrophy; Vienna, Austria; ATP International Series Gold; Hard (i) – $800,000 – 32S/16D; Singles – Doubles	(United Kingdom) Tim Henman; 6–4, 6–4, 6–4	(Germany) Tommy Haas	(France) Cédric Pioline (Switzerland) Roger Federer	(Austria) Stefan Koubek (France) Jérôme Golmard (Spain) Fernando Vicente (Netherlands) Richard Krajicek
Oct 9	CA-TennisTrophy; Vienna, Austria; ATP International Series Gold; Hard (i) – $800,000 – 32S/16D; Singles – Doubles	(Russia) Yevgeny Kafelnikov (Serbia and Montenegro) Nenad Zimonjić; 6–4, 6–4	(Czech Republic) Jiří Novák (Czech Republic) David Rikl	(France) Cédric Pioline (Switzerland) Roger Federer	(Austria) Stefan Koubek (France) Jérôme Golmard (Spain) Fernando Vicente (Netherlands) Richard Krajicek
Oct 16	Heineken Open Shanghai; Shanghai, People's Republic of China; ATP International Series; Hard – $375,000 – 32S/16D; Singles – Doubles	(Sweden) Magnus Norman; 6–4, 4–6, 6–3	(Netherlands) Sjeng Schalken	(United States) Michael Chang (Spain) Álex Calatrava	(Sweden) Jonas Björkman (Chile) Nicolás Massú (Zimbabwe) Byron Black (Ecuador) Nicolás Lapentti
Oct 16	Heineken Open Shanghai; Shanghai, People's Republic of China; ATP International Series; Hard – $375,000 – 32S/16D; Singles – Doubles	(Netherlands) Paul Haarhuis (Netherlands) Sjeng Schalken; 6–2, 3–6, 6–4	(Czech Republic) Petr Pála (Czech Republic) Pavel Vízner	(United States) Michael Chang (Spain) Álex Calatrava	(Sweden) Jonas Björkman (Chile) Nicolás Massú (Zimbabwe) Byron Black (Ecuador) Nicolás Lapentti
Oct 16	Adidas Open de Toulouse; Toulouse, France; ATP International Series; Hard (i) – $400,000 – 32S/16D; Singles – Doubles	(Spain) Àlex Corretja; 6–3, 6–2	(Spain) Carlos Moyá	(Chile) Marcelo Ríos (Belarus) Max Mirnyi	(Sweden) Mikael Tillström (Spain) Juan Albert Viloca-Puig (United States) Jan-Michael Gambill (France) Nicolas Escudé
Oct 16	Adidas Open de Toulouse; Toulouse, France; ATP International Series; Hard (i) – $400,000 – 32S/16D; Singles – Doubles	(France) Julien Boutter (France) Fabrice Santoro; 7–6^{(10–8)}, 4–6, 7–6^{(7–5)}	(United States) Donald Johnson (South Africa) Piet Norval	(Chile) Marcelo Ríos (Belarus) Max Mirnyi	(Sweden) Mikael Tillström (Spain) Juan Albert Viloca-Puig (United States) Jan-Michael Gambill (France) Nicolas Escudé
Oct 23	Davidoff Swiss Indoors; Basel, Switzerland; ATP International Series; Carpet (i) – $1,000,000 – 32S/16D; Singles – Doubles	(Sweden) Thomas Enqvist; 6–2, 4–6, 7–6^{(7–4)}, 1–6, 6–1	(Switzerland) Roger Federer	(Australia) Lleyton Hewitt (United Kingdom) Tim Henman	(France) Nicolas Thomann (United Kingdom) Greg Rusedski (Morocco) Hicham Arazi (Slovakia) Dominik Hrbatý
Oct 23	Davidoff Swiss Indoors; Basel, Switzerland; ATP International Series; Carpet (i) – $1,000,000 – 32S/16D; Singles – Doubles	(United States) Donald Johnson (South Africa) Piet Norval; 7–6^{(11–9)}, 4–6, 7–6^{(7–4)}	(Switzerland) Roger Federer (Slovakia) Dominik Hrbatý	(Australia) Lleyton Hewitt (United Kingdom) Tim Henman	(France) Nicolas Thomann (United Kingdom) Greg Rusedski (Morocco) Hicham Arazi (Slovakia) Dominik Hrbatý
Oct 23	Kremlin Cup; Moscow, Russia; ATP International Series; Carpet (i) – $1,000,000 – 32S/16D; Singles – Doubles	(Russia) Yevgeny Kafelnikov; 6–2, 7–5	(Germany) David Prinosil	(Russia) Marat Safin (Switzerland) Marc Rosset	(Belarus) Vladimir Voltchkov (Sweden) Jonas Björkman (Russia) Mikhail Youzhny (Germany) Lars Burgsmüller
Oct 23	Kremlin Cup; Moscow, Russia; ATP International Series; Carpet (i) – $1,000,000 – 32S/16D; Singles – Doubles	(Sweden) Jonas Björkman (Germany) David Prinosil; 6–2, 6–3	(Czech Republic) Jiří Novák (Czech Republic) David Rikl	(Russia) Marat Safin (Switzerland) Marc Rosset	(Belarus) Vladimir Voltchkov (Sweden) Jonas Björkman (Russia) Mikhail Youzhny (Germany) Lars Burgsmüller
Oct 30	Stuttgart Masters; Stuttgart, Germany; Tennis Masters Series; Hard (i) – $2,450,000 – 48S/24D; Singles – Doubles	(South Africa) Wayne Ferreira; 7–6^{(8–6)}, 3–6, 6–7^{(5–7)}, 7–6^{(7–2)}, 6–2	(Australia) Lleyton Hewitt	(Russia) Yevgeny Kafelnikov (France) Sébastien Grosjean	(United Kingdom) Greg Rusedski (Netherlands) Sjeng Schalken (Romania) Andrei Pavel (United States) Michael Chang
Oct 30	Stuttgart Masters; Stuttgart, Germany; Tennis Masters Series; Hard (i) – $2,450,000 – 48S/24D; Singles – Doubles	(Czech Republic) Jiří Novák (Czech Republic) David Rikl; 3–6, 6–3, 6–4	(United States) Donald Johnson (South Africa) Piet Norval	(Russia) Yevgeny Kafelnikov (France) Sébastien Grosjean	(United Kingdom) Greg Rusedski (Netherlands) Sjeng Schalken (Romania) Andrei Pavel (United States) Michael Chang

=== November ===
Week	Tournament	Champions	Runners-up	Semifinalists	Quarterfinalists
Nov 6	Grand Prix de Tennis de Lyon; Lyon, France; ATP International Series; Carpet (i) – $800,000 – 32S/16D; Singles – Doubles	(France) Arnaud Clément; 7–6^{(7–2)}, 7–6^{(7–5)}	(Australia) Patrick Rafter	(Morocco) Hicham Arazi (United States) Andre Agassi	(Brazil) Gustavo Kuerten (Sweden) Thomas Enqvist (Netherlands) Raemon Sluiter (Slovakia) Karol Kučera
Nov 6	Grand Prix de Tennis de Lyon; Lyon, France; ATP International Series; Carpet (i) – $800,000 – 32S/16D; Singles – Doubles	(Netherlands) Paul Haarhuis (Australia) Sandon Stolle; 6–1, 6–7^{(2–7)}, 7–6^{(9–7)}	(Croatia) Ivan Ljubičić (United States) Jack Waite	(Morocco) Hicham Arazi (United States) Andre Agassi	(Brazil) Gustavo Kuerten (Sweden) Thomas Enqvist (Netherlands) Raemon Sluiter (Slovakia) Karol Kučera
Nov 6	St. Petersburg Open; Saint Petersburg, Russia; ATP International Series; Hard (i) – $800,000 – 32S/32Q/16D/4Q; Singles – Doubles	(Russia) Marat Safin; 2–6, 6–4, 6–4	(Slovakia) Dominik Hrbatý	(Sweden) Jonas Björkman (Russia) Yevgeny Kafelnikov	(Germany) Rainer Schüttler (United States) Jared Palmer (Belarus) Vladimir Voltchkov (Spain) Álex Calatrava
Nov 6	St. Petersburg Open; Saint Petersburg, Russia; ATP International Series; Hard (i) – $800,000 – 32S/32Q/16D/4Q; Singles – Doubles	(Canada) Daniel Nestor (Zimbabwe) Kevin Ullyett; 7–6^{(7–5)}, 7–5	(Japan) Thomas Shimada (South Africa) Myles Wakefield	(Sweden) Jonas Björkman (Russia) Yevgeny Kafelnikov	(Germany) Rainer Schüttler (United States) Jared Palmer (Belarus) Vladimir Voltchkov (Spain) Álex Calatrava
Nov 13	Tennis Masters Series–Paris; Paris, France; Tennis Masters Series; Carpet (i) – $2,450,000 – 48S/24D; Singles – Doubles	(Russia) Marat Safin; 3–6, 7–6^{(9–7)}, 6–4, 3–6, 7–6^{(10–8)}	(Australia) Mark Philippoussis	(Brazil) Gustavo Kuerten (Spain) Juan Carlos Ferrero	(Spain) Albert Costa (Germany) David Prinosil (France) Fabrice Santoro (Spain) Àlex Corretja
Nov 13	Tennis Masters Series–Paris; Paris, France; Tennis Masters Series; Carpet (i) – $2,450,000 – 48S/24D; Singles – Doubles	(Sweden) Nicklas Kulti (Belarus) Max Mirnyi; 6–4, 7–5	(Netherlands) Paul Haarhuis (Canada) Daniel Nestor	(Brazil) Gustavo Kuerten (Spain) Juan Carlos Ferrero	(Spain) Albert Costa (Germany) David Prinosil (France) Fabrice Santoro (Spain) Àlex Corretja
Nov 20	Samsung Open; Brighton, United Kingdom; ATP International Series; Hard (i) – $400,000 – 32S/18Q/16D/4Q; Singles – Doubles	(United Kingdom) Tim Henman; 6–2, 6–2	(Slovakia) Dominik Hrbatý	(South Korea) Hyung-taik Lee (Belarus) Vladimir Voltchkov	(United States) Chris Woodruff (Italy) Renzo Furlan (Croatia) Ivan Ljubičić (Italy) Davide Sanguinetti
Nov 20	Samsung Open; Brighton, United Kingdom; ATP International Series; Hard (i) – $400,000 – 32S/18Q/16D/4Q; Singles – Doubles	(Australia) Michael Hill (United States) Jeff Tarango; 6–3, 7–5	(United States) Paul Goldstein (United States) Jim Thomas	(South Korea) Hyung-taik Lee (Belarus) Vladimir Voltchkov	(United States) Chris Woodruff (Italy) Renzo Furlan (Croatia) Ivan Ljubičić (Italy) Davide Sanguinetti
Nov 20	Stockholm Open; Stockholm, Sweden; ATP International Series; Hard (i) – $800,000 – 32S/16D; Singles – Doubles	(Sweden) Thomas Johansson; 6–2, 6–4, 6–4	(Russia) Yevgeny Kafelnikov	(Sweden) Magnus Norman (France) Sébastien Grosjean	(Netherlands) Sjeng Schalken (Sweden) Jonas Björkman (Germany) Rainer Schüttler (Sweden) Andreas Vinciguerra
Nov 20	Stockholm Open; Stockholm, Sweden; ATP International Series; Hard (i) – $800,000 – 32S/16D; Singles – Doubles	(The Bahamas) Mark Knowles (Canada) Daniel Nestor; 6–3, 6–2	(Czech Republic) Petr Pála (Czech Republic) Pavel Vízner	(Sweden) Magnus Norman (France) Sébastien Grosjean	(Netherlands) Sjeng Schalken (Sweden) Jonas Björkman (Germany) Rainer Schüttler (Sweden) Andreas Vinciguerra
Nov 27	Tennis Masters Cup; Lisbon, Portugal; Tennis Masters Cup; Hard (i) – $3,700,000 – 8S (RR); Singles	(Brazil) Gustavo Kuerten; 6–4, 6–4, 6–4	(United States) Andre Agassi	(Russia) Marat Safin (United States) Pete Sampras	Round Robin (Spain) Àlex Corretja (Australia) Lleyton Hewitt (Russia) Yevgeny Kafelnikov (Sweden) Magnus Norman

=== December ===
Week	Tournament	Champions	Runners-up	Semifinalists	Quarterfinalists
Dec 4	Davis Cup Final; Barcelona, Spain – clay (i)	Spain 3–1	Australia		
Dec 11	ATP Tour World Doubles Championship; Bangalore, India; Tennis Masters Cup; Hard – $750,000 – 8D (RR); Doubles	(United States) Donald Johnson (South Africa) Piet Norval; 7–6^{(10–8)}, 6–3, 6–4	(India) Mahesh Bhupathi (India) Leander Paes		

== Statistical information ==
These tables present the number of singles (S), doubles (D), and mixed doubles (X) titles won by each player and each nation during the season, within all the tournament categories of the 2000 ATP Tour: the Grand Slam tournaments, the tennis event at the Summer Olympics, the year-end championships (Tennis Masters Cup and ATP Tour World Doubles Championships), the Tennis Masters Series, the ATP International Series Gold, and the ATP International Series. The players/nations are sorted by: 1 total number of titles (a doubles title won by two players representing the same nation counts as only one win for the nation); 2) cumulated importance of those titles (one Grand Slam win equalling two Masters Series wins, one year-end championships equalling one-and-a-half Masters Series win, one Olympics win or Masters Series win equalling two International Series Gold wins, one International Series Gold win equalling two International Series wins); 3) a singles > doubles > mixed doubles hierarchy; 4) alphabetical order (by family names for players).

Key

Grand Slam tournaments
Year-end championships
Summer Olympics
Tennis Masters Series
ATP International Series Gold
ATP International Series
All titles

=== Titles won by player ===
Total	Player	Grand Slam			Year-end		Olympics		Masters Series		International Series Gold		International Series		Total		
Total	Player	S	D	X	S	D	S	D	S	D	S	D	S	D	S	D	X
8	Todd Woodbridge (AUS)		2							3				3	0	8	0
8	Mark Woodforde (AUS)		2							3				3	0	8	0
7	Marat Safin (RUS)	1							2		1		3		7	0	0
6	Gustavo Kuerten (BRA)	1			1				1		1		1	1	5	1	0
6	Donald Johnson (USA)			1		1						1		3	0	5	1
6	Lleyton Hewitt (AUS)		1									1	4		4	2	0
5	Jared Palmer (USA)			2						1		1		1	0	3	2
5	Àlex Corretja (ESP)								1		2		2		5	0	0
5	Magnus Norman (SWE)								1				4		5	0	0
4	David Adams (RSA)			1								2		1	0	3	1
4	Yevgeny Kafelnikov (RUS)						1			1		1	1		2	2	0
4	Piet Norval (RSA)					1								3	0	4	0
4	Daniel Nestor (CAN)							1		1				2	0	4	0
4	Nicklas Kulti (SWE)									1		1		2	0	4	0
4	Jiří Novák (CZE)									1		1		2	0	4	0
4	David Rikl (CZE)									1		1		2	0	4	0
3	Max Mirnyi (BLR)		1							1				1	0	3	0
3	Ellis Ferreira (RSA)		1											2	0	3	0
3	Rick Leach (USA)		1											2	0	3	0
3	Sébastien Lareau (CAN)							1		1		1			0	3	0
3	Martin Damm (CZE)									1				2	0	3	0
3	John-Laffnie de Jager (RSA)											2		1	0	3	0
3	Sandon Stolle (AUS)											1		2	0	3	0
3	Mikael Tillström (SWE)											1		2	0	3	0
3	David Prinosil (GER)												1	2	1	2	0
3	Kevin Ullyett (ZIM)													3	0	3	0
2	Pete Sampras (USA)	1							1						2	0	0
2	Wayne Ferreira (RSA)								1	1					1	1	0
2	Cédric Pioline (FRA)								1		1				2	0	0
2	Alex O'Brien (USA)									1		1			0	2	0
2	Thomas Enqvist (SWE)								1				1		2	0	0
2	Tim Henman (GBR)										1		1		2	0	0
2	Marc Rosset (SUI)										1		1		2	0	0
2	Franco Squillari (ARG)										1		1		2	0	0
2	Sjeng Schalken (NED)										1			1	1	1	0
2	Pablo Albano (ARG)											1		1	0	2	0
2	Mahesh Bhupathi (IND)											1		1	0	2	0
2	Justin Gimelstob (USA)											1		1	0	2	0
2	Leander Paes (IND)											1		1	0	2	0
2	Cyril Suk (CZE)											1		1	0	2	0
2	Nenad Zimonjić (YUG)											1		1	0	2	0
2	Nicolas Kiefer (GER)												2		2	0	0
2	Arnaud Clément (FRA)												1	1	1	1	0
2	Sébastien Grosjean (FRA)												1	1	1	1	0
2	Fabrice Santoro (FRA)												1	1	1	1	0
2	Julien Boutter (FRA)													2	0	2	0
2	Mark Knowles (BAH)													2	0	2	0
2	Paul Haarhuis (NED)													2	0	2	0
2	Scott Humphries (USA)													2	0	2	0
1	Andre Agassi (USA)	1													1	0	0
1	Dominik Hrbatý (SVK)									1					0	1	0
1	Juan Ignacio Chela (ARG)										1				1	0	0
1	Magnus Larsson (SWE)										1				1	0	0
1	Byron Black (ZIM)											1			0	1	0
1	Joan Balcells (ESP)												1		1	0	0
1	Álex Calatrava (ESP)												1		1	0	0
1	Michael Chang (USA)												1		1	0	0
1	Jérôme Golmard (FRA)												1		1	0	0
1	Fernando González (CHI)												1		1	0	0
1	Magnus Gustafsson (SWE)												1		1	0	0
1	Andrew Ilie (AUS)												1		1	0	0
1	Thomas Johansson (SWE)												1		1	0	0
1	Stefan Koubek (AUT)												1		1	0	0
1	Carlos Moyá (ESP)												1		1	0	0
1	Andrei Pavel (ROU)												1		1	0	0
1	Mark Philippoussis (AUS)												1		1	0	0
1	Mariano Puerta (ARG)												1		1	0	0
1	Patrick Rafter (AUS)												1		1	0	0
1	Olivier Rochus (BEL)												1		1	0	0
1	Marcelo Ríos (CHI)												1		1	0	0
1	Fernando Vicente (ESP)												1		1	0	0
1	Andreas Vinciguerra (SWE)												1		1	0	0
1	Peter Wessels (NED)												1		1	0	0
1	Lucas Arnold Ker (ARG)													1	0	1	0
1	Simon Aspelin (SWE)													1	0	1	0
1	Jonas Björkman (SWE)													1	0	1	0
1	Wayne Black (ZIM)													1	0	1	0
1	Tomás Carbonell (ESP)													1	0	1	0
1	Tomáš Cibulec (CZE)													1	0	1	0
1	Jonathan Erlich (ISR)													1	0	1	0
1	Leoš Friedl (CZE)													1	0	1	0
1	Martín García (ARG)													1	0	1	0
1	Jan-Michael Gambill (USA)													1	0	1	0
1	Michael Hill (AUS)													1	0	1	0
1	Paul Kilderry (AUS)													1	0	1	0
1	Andrew Kratzmann (AUS)													1	0	1	0
1	Johan Landsberg (SWE)													1	0	1	0
1	Harel Levy (ISR)													1	0	1	0
1	Michaël Llodra (FRA)													1	0	1	0
1	Alberto Martín (ESP)													1	0	1	0
1	Álex López Morón (ESP)													1	0	1	0
1	Brian MacPhie (USA)													1	0	1	0
1	Diego Nargiso (ITA)													1	0	1	0
1	Albert Portas (ESP)													1	0	1	0
1	Antonio Prieto (BRA)													1	0	1	0
1	Eyal Ran (ISR)													1	0	1	0
1	Richey Reneberg (USA)													1	0	1	0
1	Christophe Rochus (BEL)													1	0	1	0
1	Sergio Roitman (ARG)													1	0	1	0
1	Andrés Schneiter (ARG)													1	0	1	0
1	Jan Siemerink (NED)													1	0	1	0
1	Jonathan Stark (USA)													1	0	1	0
1	Jeff Tarango (USA)													1	0	1	0

=== Titles won by nation ===
Total	Nation	Grand Slam			Year-end		Olympics		Masters Series		International Series Gold		International Series		Total		
Total	Nation	S	D	X	S	D	S	D	S	D	S	D	S	D	S	D	X
24	United States (USA)	2	1	3		1			1	1		3	1	11	4	17	3
21	Australia (AUS)		3							3		1	7	7	7	14	0
17	Sweden (SWE)								2	1	1	1	8	4	11	6	0
13	South Africa (RSA)		1	1		1			1	1		2		6	1	11	1
12	Spain (ESP)								1		2		6	3	9	3	0
11	Russia (RUS)	1					1		2	1	1	1	4		9	2	0
10	France (FRA)								1		1		4	4	6	4	0
9	Czech Republic (CZE)									2		2		5	0	9	0
8	Argentina (ARG)										2	1	2	3	4	4	0
6	Brazil (BRA)	1			1				1		1		1	1	5	1	0
5	Canada (CAN)							1		1		1		2	0	5	0
5	Netherlands (NED)										1		1	3	2	3	0
5	Germany (GER)												3	2	3	2	0
4	Zimbabwe (ZIM)											1		3	0	4	0
3	Belarus (BLR)		1							1				1	0	3	0
3	India (IND)											1		2	0	3	0
2	Great Britain (GBR)										1		1		2	0	0
2	Switzerland (SUI)										1		1		2	0	0
2	FR Yugoslavia (YUG)											1		1	0	2	0
2	Belgium (BEL)												1	1	1	1	0
2	Chile (CHI)												2		2	0	0
2	Bahamas (BAH)													2	0	2	0
2	Israel (ISR)													2	0	2	0
1	Slovakia (SVK)									1					0	1	0
1	Austria (AUT)												1		1	0	0
1	Romania (ROU)												1		1	0	0
1	Italy (ITA)													1	0	1	0

== ATP rankings ==
These are the ATP rankings of the top twenty singles players, doubles players, and the top ten doubles teams on the ATP Tour, at the end of the 1999 ATP Tour, and of the 2000 season, with number of rankings points, number of tournaments played, year-end ranking in 1999, highest and lowest position during the season (for singles and doubles individual only, as doubles team rankings are not calculated over a rolling year-to-date system), and number of spots gained or lost from the 1999 to the 2000 year-end rankings.

=== Singles ===
as of December 27, 1999
#	Player	Points
1	Andre Agassi (USA)	5048
2	Yevgeny Kafelnikov (RUS)	3465
3	Pete Sampras (USA)	3024
4	Thomas Enqvist (SWE)	2606
5	Gustavo Kuerten (BRA)	2601
6	Nicolas Kiefer (GER)	2447
7	Todd Martin (USA)	2408
8	Nicolás Lapentti (ECU)	2284
9	Marcelo Ríos (CHI)	2245
10	Richard Krajicek (NED)	2095
11	Tommy Haas (GER)	1921
12	Tim Henman (GBR)	1920
13	Cédric Pioline (FRA)	1814
14	Greg Rusedski (GBR)	1802
15	Magnus Norman (SWE)	1748
16	Patrick Rafter (AUS)	1731
17	Karol Kučera (SVK)	1633
18	Albert Costa (ESP)	1572
19	Mark Philippoussis (AUS)	1570
20	Vincent Spadea (USA)	1542

Year-end rankings 2000 (25 December 2000)
#	Player	Points	#Trn	'99 Rk	High	Low	'99→'00
1	Gustavo Kuerten (BRA)	4195	23	5	1	7	▲4
2	Marat Safin (RUS)	4120	30	24	1	38	▲22
3	Pete Sampras (USA)	3385	16	3	1	4	=
4	Magnus Norman (SWE)	3110	26	15	2	14	▲11
5	Yevgeny Kafelnikov (RUS)	2935	32	2	2	8	▼3
6	Andre Agassi (USA)	2765	19	1	1	8	▼5
7	Lleyton Hewitt (AUS)	2625	21	25	6	21	▲18
8	Àlex Corretja (ESP)	2475	25	26	6	32	▲18
9	Thomas Enqvist (SWE)	2210	25	4	5	12	▼5
10	Tim Henman (GBR)	2020	26	12	9	17	▲2
11	Mark Philippoussis (AUS)	1865	23	19	11	35	▲8
12	Juan Carlos Ferrero (ESP)	1840	27	42	11	45	▲30
13	Wayne Ferreira (RSA)	1770	23	53	11	54	▲40
14	Franco Squillari (ARG)	1598	27	52	11	52	▲38
15	Patrick Rafter (AUS)	1535	21	16	13	27	▲1
16	Cédric Pioline (FRA)	1520	24	13	5	16	▼3
17	Dominik Hrbatý (SVK)	1395	29	21	13	37	▲4
18	Arnaud Clément (FRA)	1360	29	56	17	62	▲28
19	Sébastien Grosjean (FRA)	1325	28	27	18	35	▲8
20	Nicolas Kiefer (GER)	1265	23	6	4	20	▼14

=== Doubles (Individual) ===
as of December 27, 1999
#	Player	Points
1	Leander Paes (IND)	4339
2	Mahesh Bhupathi (IND)	3851
3	Jonas Björkman (SWE)	3623
4	Sébastien Lareau (CAN)	3137
5	Paul Haarhuis (NED)	2990
6	Jared Palmer (USA)	2889
7	Alex O'Brien (USA)	2756
8	Todd Woodbridge (AUS)	2716
9	Sandon Stolle (AUS)	2705
10	Byron Black (ZIM)	2619
11	Mark Woodforde (AUS)	2619
12	David Adams (RSA)	2549
13	Ellis Ferreira (RSA)	2542
14	Wayne Black (ZIM)	2400
15	Rick Leach (USA)	2395
16	Olivier Delaître (FRA)	2352
17	Jeff Tarango (USA)	2318
18	John-Laffnie de Jager (RSA)	2249
19	Patrick Rafter (AUS)	2214
20	Daniel Vacek (CZE)	2034

Year-end rankings 2000 (25 December 2000)
#	Player	Points	#Trn	'99 Rk	High	Low	'99→'00
1	Mark Woodforde (AUS)	4985	19	11	1	12	▲10
2	Todd Woodbridge (AUS)	4970	16	8	1	10	▲6
3	Sandon Stolle (AUS)	4085	25	9	3	18	▲6
4	Paul Haarhuis (NED)	3850	16	5	3	15	▲1
5	Ellis Ferreira (RSA)	3565	20	13	2	13	▲8
6	Rick Leach (USA)	3565	21	15	3	15	▲9
7	Jared Palmer (USA)	3260	25	6	1	9	▼1
8	Alex O'Brien (USA)	3020	20	7	1	11	▼1
9	Max Mirnyi (BLR)	2990	23	33	9	39	▲24
10	Jiří Novák (CZE)	2960	22	32	8	34	▲22
11	David Rikl (CZE)	2960	24	29	9	29	▲18
12	Yevgeny Kafelnikov (RUS)	2800	17	46	9	51	▲34
13	Daniel Nestor (CAN)	2630	14	27	13	51	▲14
14	Wayne Ferreira (RSA)	2520	20	31	11	41	▲17
15	Nicklas Kulti (SWE)	2455	17	37	14	45	▲22
16	Dominik Hrbatý (SVK)	2285	21	145	14	129	▲129
17	Sébastien Lareau (CAN)	2265	15	4	4	17	▼13
18	Donald Johnson (USA)	2265	27	36	16	37	▲18
19	David Adams (RSA)	2255	34	12	10	19	▼7
20	Lleyton Hewitt (AUS)	2155	12	185	18	149	▲165

=== Doubles (Team) ===
as of December 27, 1999
#	Player	Points
1	Mahesh Bhupathi (IND); Leander Paes (IND)	4019
2	Sébastien Lareau (CAN); Alex O'Brien (USA)	3007
3	Mark Woodforde (AUS); Todd Woodbridge (AUS)	2837
4	Ellis Ferreira (RSA); Rick Leach (USA)	2439
5	Wayne Black (ZIM); Sandon Stolle (AUS)	2275
6	David Adams (RSA); John-Laffnie de Jager (RSA)	2249
7	Jonas Björkman (SWE); Patrick Rafter (AUS)	2097
8	Paul Haarhuis (NED); Jared Palmer (USA)	2072
9	Piet Norval (RSA); Kevin Ullyett (ZIM)	1833
10	Jiří Novák (CZE); David Rikl (CZE)	1636

as of December 25, 2000
#	Player	Points	#Trn	'99 Rk	'99→'00
1	Mark Woodforde (AUS); Todd Woodbridge (AUS)	990	16	3	▲2
2	Ellis Ferreira (RSA); Rick Leach (USA)	718	21	4	▲2
3	Paul Haarhuis (NED); Sandon Stolle (AUS)	686	14	—	▲ new
4	Alex O'Brien (USA); Jared Palmer (USA)	623	24	54	▲50
5	Jiří Novák (CZE); David Rikl (CZE)	592	24	10	▲5
6	Wayne Ferreira (RSA); Yevgeny Kafelnikov (RUS)	457	12	203	▲197
7	Donald Johnson (USA); Piet Norval (RSA)	448	14	—	▲ new
8	David Adams (RSA); John-Laffnie de Jager (RSA)	419	27	6	▼2
9	Joshua Eagle (AUS); Andrew Florent (AUS)	383	29	41	▲32
10	Nicklas Kulti (SWE); Mikael Tillström (SWE)	366	14	15	▲5

== Retirements ==
Following is a list of notable players (winners of a main tour title, and/or part of the ATP rankings top 100 (singles) or top 50 (doubles) for at least one week) who announced their retirement from professional tennis, became inactive (after not playing for more than 52 weeks), or were permanently banned from playing, during the 2000 season:

- GBR Neil Broad (born 20 November 1966 in Cape Town, South Africa) He turned professional in 1986 and reached his career-high doubles ranking of world no. 9 in 1990. He reached the semifinals of the Australian Open in 1990, the quarterfinals of Wimbledon in 1997, and the quarterfinals of the US Open in 1998. He earned seven career doubles titles and a silver medal at the 1996 Olympics. He played his last career match at Wimbledon partnering Arvind Parmar.
- RUS Andrei Cherkasov (born July 4, 1970, in Ufa, USSR) He turned professional in 1988 and reached his career-high singles ranking of no. 13 in 1991. He reached the quarterfinals of the Australian Open in 1990, the French Open in 1992, and the US Open in 1990. He won a bronze medal in the 1992 Olympics.
- USA Jim Courier (born August 17, 1970, in Sanford, Florida) He turned professional in 1988 and became world no. 1 in 1992. He won the Australian Open in 1992 and 1993, the French Open in 1991 and 1992, and was a finalist at Wimbledon in 1993 and the US Open in 1991, as well as the year-end finals in 1991 and 1992. He was also ranked no. 20 in doubles and earned six career doubles titles. His last career match was at the Miami Masters in March against Thomas Enqvist.
- URU Marcelo Filippini (born 4 August 1967, in Montevideo, Uruguay) He became a professional in 1987 and reached his career-high ranking of world no. 30 in 1990. He reached the quarterfinals of the Australian Open and earned five career titles. He was also ranking no. 34 in doubles and earned 3 titles. His last match was in Kitzbühel in July against Bohdan Ulihrach.
- CZE Petr Korda (born 23 January 1968 in Prague, Czechoslovakia) He turned professional in 1987 and reached a career-high ranking of world no. 2 in 1998. He won the Australian Open in 1998, was a finalist at the French Open and a quarterfinalist at Wimbledon and the US Open. He earned 10 career ATP titles. He played his last career match in Prague in December against Martin Hromec.
- SWE Nicklas Kulti (born 22 April 1971 in Stockholm, Sweden) He turned professional in 1989 and reached his career-high ranking of world no. 32 in 1993. He reached the quarterfinals at the French Open in 1992 and earned three career ATP titles. In doubles, he was ranked no. 11 in 1997 and earned 13 titles. He was a finalist in the French Open in 1995 and the US Open in 1997, as well as a semifinalist at Wimbledon in 2000. He played his last career match in Stockholm in November partnering Jared Palmer.
- USA Richey Reneberg (born 5 October 1965 in Phoenix, Arizona) He turned professional in 1987 and reached his career-high singles ranking of no. 20 in 1991. He earned 3 singles titles and 19 doubles titles. He was ranked no. 1 in doubles in 1993 and played his last match in Bermuda in April partnering Jim Grabb.
- ESP Javier Sánchez (born 1968 in Pamplona, Spain) He turned professional in 1986 and reached his career-high ranking of no. 23 in 1994. He reached the quarterfinals at the US Open in 1991 and 1996 and earned four career singles titles. In doubles, he was ranked no. 9 in 1990 and earned 26 career titles. He played his last match in Bogotá in March partnering Tomás Carbonell.
- AUS Mark Woodforde (born 23 September 1965 in Adelaide, Australia) He turned professional in 1984 and reached a career-high ranking of world no. 19 in singles and no. 1 in doubles. He won four singles titles and 67 men's doubles titles, including the Australian Open twice (1992 and 1997), the French Open once (2000), Wimbledon six times (1993, 1994, 1995, 1996, 1997, and 2000), the US Open three times (1989, 1995, and 1996), and the year-end finals twice (1992 and 1996). He won a gold medal in men's doubles at the 1996 Olympics and a silver in 2000. He also earned five mixed doubles Grand Slam titles: Australia in 1992 and 1996, French in 1992, Wimbledon in 1993, and the US Open in 1992.

== See also ==
- 2000 WTA Tour
- Association of Tennis Professionals
- International Tennis Federation
