= 2000 Gelsor Open Romania =

- Date: 11–17 September
- Edition: 8th
- Category: ATP International Series 2
- Draw: 32S / 16D
- Prize money: $375,000
- Surface: Clay / outdoor
- Location: Bucharest, Romania
- Venue: Arenele BNR

Champions

Singles
- (Spain) Joan Balcells

Doubles
- (Spain) Alberto Martín / (Israel) Eyal Ran
← 1999 ·	Romanian Open	· 2001 →

The 2000 Gelsor Open Romania was a men's tennis tournament played on outdoor clay courts at the Arenele BNR in Bucharest in Romania and was part of the International Series of the 2000 ATP Tour. It was the eighth and final edition of the tournament and was held from 11 September through 17 September 2000. Unseeded Joan Balcells won the singles title.

== Singles main draw entrants ==
=== Seeds ===
Country	Player	Rank^{1}	Seed
ARG	Mariano Puerta	18	1
MAR	Karim Alami	33	2
AUT	Stefan Koubek	45	3
ESP	Francisco Clavet	46	4
SWE	Magnus Gustafsson	52	5
ESP	Alberto Martín	62	6
ESP	Albert Portas	70	7
ESP	Álex Calatrava	73	8

- ^{1} Rankings were as of August 28, 2000.

=== Other entrants ===
The following players received wildcards into the singles main draw:

- (Romania) Ionuț Moldovan
- (Romania) Dinu Pescariu
- (Romania) Răzvan Sabău

The following players received entry from the qualifying draw:

- (Germany) Marc-Kevin Goellner
- (Germany) Jakub Herm-Zahlava
- (Germany) Michael Kohlmann
- (Brazil) Alexandre Simoni

== Doubles main draw entrants ==
=== Seeds ===
Country	Player	Country	Player	Rank^{1}	Seed
ESP	Tomás Carbonell	ARG	Martín García	70	1
ARG	Pablo Albano	ARG	Lucas Arnold Ker	90	2
RUS	Andrei Olhovskiy	CZE	Cyril Suk	96	3
RSA	Chris Haggard	BEL	Tom Vanhoudt	117	4

- Rankings were as of August 28, 2000.

=== Other entrants ===
The following pairs received wildcards into the doubles main draw:

- (Romania) Ionuț Moldovan / (Romania) Dinu Pescariu
- (Romania) Gabriel Moraru / (Russia) Serguei Novosselov
- (Hungary) Sándor Noszály / (Romania) Răzvan Sabău

== Finals ==
=== Singles ===
(Spain) Joan Balcells defeated (Germany) Markus Hantschk 6–4, 3–6, 7–6^{(7–1)}

- It was Balcells' only title of the year and also of his career.

=== Doubles ===
(Spain) Alberto Martín / (Israel) Eyal Ran defeated (United States) Devin Bowen / (Argentina) Mariano Hood 7–6^{(7–4)}, 6–1

- It was Martín's only title of the year and the 3rd of his career (singles and doubles combined). It was Ran's only title of the year and the also of his career.
