= 2000 Kroger St. Jude International – Doubles =

Doubles
- 2000 Kroger St. Jude International

Final
- Champions: (United States) Justin Gimelstob (Canada) Sébastien Lareau
- Runners-up: (United States) Jim Grabb (United States) Richey Reneberg
- Score: 6–2, 6–4

Details
- Draw: 24
- Seeds: 8

Events
Singles	Doubles
← 1999 ·	U.S. National Indoor Championships	· 2001 →

Todd Woodbridge and Mark Woodforde were the defending champions, but none competed this year.

Justin Gimelstob and Sébastien Lareau won the title by defeating Jim Grabb and Richey Reneberg 6–2, 6–4 in the final.

== Seeds ==
All seeds received a bye to the second round.

1. (South Africa) Ellis Ferreira / (United States) Rick Leach (semifinals)
2. (United States) Alex O'Brien / (United States) Jared Palmer (second round)
3. (United States) Justin Gimelstob / (Canada) Sébastien Lareau (champions)
4. (The Bahamas) Mark Knowles / (Belarus) Max Mirnyi (second round)
5. (South Africa) Wayne Ferreira / (South Africa) Brent Haygarth (second round)
6. (United States) Jan-Michael Gambill / (United States) Scott Humphries (quarterfinals)
7. (United States) Donald Johnson / (United States) Francisco Montana (quarterfinals)
8. (Australia) David Macpherson / (South Africa) Grant Stafford (quarterfinals)

== Draw ==
=== Key ===
- Q = Qualifier
- WC = Wild card
- LL = Lucky loser
- Alt = Alternate
- ITF = ITF entry
- PR = Protected ranking
- SR = Special ranking
- SE = Special exempt
- JE = Junior exempt
- JR = Junior Accelerator Programme entrant
- CO = College Accelerator Programme entrant
- NG = Next Gen Accelerator Program entrant
- w/o = Walkover
- r = Retired
- d = Defaulted

=== Finals ===
Semifinals
1	(South Africa) Ellis Ferreira (United States) Rick Leach	3	6^{3}
(United States) Jim Grabb (United States) Richey Reneberg	6	7^{7}
3	(United States) Justin Gimelstob (Canada) Sébastien Lareau	6	6
(Argentina) Pablo Albano (Federal Republic of Yugoslavia) Nenad Zimonjić	4	4

Final
(United States) Jim Grabb (United States) Richey Reneberg	2	4
3	(United States) Justin Gimelstob (Canada) Sébastien Lareau	6	6

=== Top half ===
First round
WC	(United States) P Goldstein (United States) C Woodruff	4	4
(United States) B Bryan (United States) M Bryan	6	6
Q	(Spain) J Alonso (Spain) J Balcells	7	6
(Australia) P Kilderry (Australia) G Silcock	5	1
(Philippines) E Taino (Australia) M Tebbutt	3	4
(United States) J Grabb (United States) R Reneberg	6	6
(Argentina) G Etlis (Argentina) M Rodríguez	1	6^{9}
(United States) P Galbraith (United States) B MacPhie	6	7^{11}

Second round
1	(South Africa) E Ferreira (United States) R Leach	6	6
(United States) B Bryan (United States) M Bryan	2	2
Q	(Spain) J Alonso (Spain) J Balcells	4	4
7	(United States) D Johnson (United States) F Montana	6	6
4	(The Bahamas) M Knowles (Belarus) M Mirnyi	6	2	2
(United States) J Grabb (United States) R Reneberg	3	6	6
(United States) P Galbraith (United States) B MacPhie	4	6	7
5	(South Africa) W Ferreira (South Africa) B Haygarth	6	1	5

Quarterfinals
1	(South Africa) E Ferreira (United States) R Leach	6	6
7	(United States) D Johnson (United States) F Montana	0	3
(United States) J Grabb (United States) R Reneberg	6	6
(United States) P Galbraith (United States) B MacPhie	2	4

Semifinals
1	(South Africa) E Ferreira (United States) R Leach	3	6^{3}
(United States) J Grabb (United States) R Reneberg	6	7^{7}

=== Bottom half ===
First round
LL	(Lebanon) A Hamadeh (Switzerland) L Manta	4	6^{4}
WC	(Germany) T Haas (United States) G Weiner	6	7^{7}
(Australia) M Hill (South Africa) M Ondruska	6	6
WC	(United States) L Jensen (United States) M Jensen	2	4
(United States) G Grant (United States) J Waite	6	6^{4}	6
(United States) D Bowen (Sweden) J Landsberg	4	7^{7}	2
(United States) B Coupe (United States) M Sell	5	2
(Argentina) P Albano (Federal Republic of Yugoslavia) N Zimonjić	7	6

Second round
6	(United States) JM Gambill (United States) S Humphries	6^{3}	7^{8}	6
WC	(Germany) T Haas (United States) G Weiner	7^{7}	6^{6}	4
(Australia) M Hill (South Africa) M Ondruska	3	4
3	(United States) J Gimelstob (Canada) S Lareau	6	6
8	(Australia) D Macpherson (South Africa) G Stafford	6	6
(United States) G Grant (United States) J Waite	4	4
(Argentina) P Albano (Federal Republic of Yugoslavia) N Zimonjić	6	4	6
2	(United States) A O'Brien (United States) J Palmer	4	6	3

Quarterfinals
6	(United States) JM Gambill (United States) S Humphries	7^{7}	3	4
3	(United States) J Gimelstob (Canada) S Lareau	6^{1}	6	6
8	(Australia) D Macpherson (South Africa) G Stafford	6^{5}	4
(Argentina) P Albano (Federal Republic of Yugoslavia) N Zimonjić	7^{7}	6

Semifinals
3	(United States) J Gimelstob (Canada) S Lareau	6	6
(Argentina) P Albano (Federal Republic of Yugoslavia) N Zimonjić	4	4
