= 2000 Gelsor Open Romania – Doubles =

Doubles
- 2000 Gelsor Open Romania

Final
- Champions: (Spain) Alberto Martín (Israel) Eyal Ran
- Runners-up: (United States) Devin Bowen (Argentina) Mariano Hood
- Score: 7–6^{(7–4)}, 6–1

Events
| Singles | Doubles |
- Romanian Open

Lucas Arnold Ker and Martín García were the defending champions, but competed this year with different partners. Arnold Ker teamed up with Pablo Albano and lost in quarterfinals to Devin Bowen and Mariano Hood, while García teamed up with Tomás Carbonell and lost in semifinals to Alberto Martín and Eyal Ran.

Alberto Martín and Eyal Ran won the title by defeating Devin Bowen and Mariano Hood 7–6^{(7–4)}, 6–1 in the final.

== Seeds ==
1. (Spain) Tomás Carbonell / (Argentina) Martín García (semifinals)
2. (Argentina) Pablo Albano / (Argentina) Lucas Arnold Ker (quarterfinals)
3. (Russia) Andrei Olhovskiy / (Czech Republic) Cyril Suk (quarterfinals)
4. (South Africa) Chris Haggard / (Belgium) Tom Vanhoudt (first round)

== Draw ==
Key

- Q = Qualifier
- WC = Wild card
- LL = Lucky loser
- Alt = Alternate
- ITF = ITF entry
- PR = Protected ranking
- SR = Special ranking
- SE = Special exempt
- JE = Junior exempt
- JR = Junior Accelerator Programme entrant
- CO = College Accelerator Programme entrant
- NG = Next Gen Accelerator Program entrant
- w/o = Walkover
- r = Retired
- d = Defaulted

=== Draw ===
First round
1 | (Spain) T Carbonell (Argentina) M García | 6 | 6
(Czech Republic) P Pála (Czech Republic) P Vízner | 3 | 3
WC | (Romania) I Moldovan (Romania) D Pescariu | 2 | 6 | 6
(Czech Republic) T Cibulec (Czech Republic) L Friedl | 6 | 3 | 3
4 | (South Africa) C Haggard (Belgium) T Vanhoudt | 3 | 2
(Spain) A Martín (Israel) E Ran | 6 | 6
WC | (Hungary) S Noszály (Romania) R Sabău | 6 | 6
WC | (Romania) G Moraru (Russia) Sergei Novosselov | 4 | 2
(Germany) MK Goellner (Italy) D Nargiso | 6 | 6
(Spain) Á López Morón (Spain) A Portas | 4 | 4
(Germany) M Kohlmann (Sweden) J Landsberg | 3 | 3
3 | (Russia) A Olhovskiy (Czech Republic) C Suk | 6 | 6
Q | (United States) D Bowen (Argentina) M Hood | 7 | 6
(Spain) J Balcells (Spain) JI Carrasco | 5 | 4
(North Macedonia) A Kitinov (United States) J Waite | 2 | 2
2 | (Argentina) P Albano (Argentina) L Arnold Ker | 6 | 6

Quarterfinals
1 | (Spain) T Carbonell (Argentina) M García | 6 | 6
WC | (Romania) I Moldovan (Romania) D Pescariu | 0 | 1
(Spain) A Martín (Israel) E Ran | 6 | 7
WC | (Hungary) S Noszály (Romania) R Sabău | 0 | 5
(Germany) MK Goellner (Italy) D Nargiso | 3 | 6 | 7^{7}
3 | (Russia) A Olhovskiy (Czech Republic) C Suk | 6 | 4 | 6^{1}
Q | (United States) D Bowen (Argentina) M Hood | 7^{7} | 6
2 | (Argentina) P Albano (Argentina) L Arnold Ker | 6^{5} | 4

Semifinals
1 | (Spain) T Carbonell (Argentina) M García | 6 | 4 | 1
(Spain) A Martín (Israel) E Ran | 0 | 6 | 6
(Germany) MK Goellner (Italy) D Nargiso | 3 | 7 | 4
Q | (United States) D Bowen (Argentina) M Hood | 6 | 5 | 6

Final
(Spain) A Martín (Israel) E Ran | 7^{7} | 6
Q | (United States) D Bowen (Argentina) M Hood | 6^{4} | 1
