= 2000 Salem Open =

- Date: 2–8 October
- Edition: 25th
- Category: International Series
- Draw: 32S / 16D
- Prize money: $375,000
- Surface: Hard / outdoor
- Location: Hong Kong

Champions

Singles
- (Germany) Nicolas Kiefer

Doubles
- (Zimbabwe) Wayne Black / (Zimbabwe) Kevin Ullyett
- Salem Open

The 2000 Salem Open was a men's professional tennis tournament played on outdoor hard courts in Hong Kong and was part of the International Series of the 2000 ATP Tour. It was the 25th edition of the tournament and was held from 2 October through 8 October 2000. Third-seeded Nicolas Kiefer won the singles title.

== Finals ==
=== Singles ===
(Germany) Nicolas Kiefer defeated (Australia) Mark Philippoussis 7–6^{(7–4)}, 2–6, 6–2

- It was Kiefer' 2nd singles title of the year and the 6th and last of his career.

=== Doubles ===
(Zimbabwe) Wayne Black / (Zimbabwe) Kevin Ullyett defeated (Slovakia) Dominik Hrbatý / (Germany) David Prinosil 6–1, 6–2

- It was Black's only doubles title of the year and the 4th of his career. It was Ullyett's 2nd doubles title of the year and the 9th of his career.
