= 2000 Kroger St. Jude International =

- Date: February 14–20
- Edition: 30th
- Category: ATP International Series Gold
- Draw: 48S / 24D
- Prize money: $700,000
- Surface: Hard / indoor
- Location: Memphis, United States

Champions

Singles
- (Sweden) Magnus Larsson

Doubles
- (United States) Justin Gimelstob / (United States) Sébastien Lareau
- U.S. National Indoor Championships

The 2000 Kroger St. Jude International was a men's tennis tournament played on indoor hard courts in Memphis, United States, that was part of the ATP International Series Gold of the 2000 ATP Tour. It was the 30th edition of the tournament and was held from 14 February through 20 February. Magnus Larsson, who was seeded 16th, won the singles title.

== Finals ==
=== Singles ===
(Sweden) Magnus Larsson defeated (Zimbabwe) Byron Black, 6–2, 1–6, 6–3

- It was Larsson's 1st singles title of the year and the 7th and last of his career.

=== Doubles ===
(United States) Justin Gimelstob / (Canada) Sébastien Lareau defeated (United States) Jim Grabb / (United States) Richey Reneberg, 6–2, 6–4
