= 2000 Kroger St. Jude International – Singles =

Singles
- 2000 Kroger St. Jude International

Final
- Champion: (Sweden) Magnus Larsson
- Runner-up: (Zimbabwe) Byron Black
- Score: 6–2, 1–6, 6–3

Details
- Draw: 48 (3WC/6Q/1LL)
- Seeds: 16

Events
Singles	Doubles
← 1999 ·	U.S. National Indoor Championships	· 2001 →

Tommy Haas was the defending champion, but lost in the semifinals to Byron Black.

Magnus Larsson won the title by defeating Byron Black 6–2, 1–6, 6–3 in the final.

== Seeds ==
All seeds received a bye to the second round.

1. (Australia) Mark Philippoussis (third round, withdrew)
2. (Germany) Tommy Haas (semifinals)
3. (United States) Vince Spadea (second round)
4. (United States) Chris Woodruff (third round)
5. (United States) Michael Chang (quarterfinals)
6. (United States) Jim Courier (second round)
7. (South Africa) Wayne Ferreira (quarterfinals)
8. (United States) Jan-Michael Gambill (third round)
9. (Germany) Rainer Schüttler (quarterfinals)
10. (Belarus) Max Mirnyi (second round)
11. (Armenia) Sargis Sargsian (quarterfinals)
12. (Argentina) Hernán Gumy (third round)
13. (Zimbabwe) Byron Black (final)
14. (Australia) Richard Fromberg (third round)
15. (Sweden) Mikael Tillström (third round)
16. (Sweden) Magnus Larsson (champion)

== Draw ==
=== Key ===
- Q = Qualifier
- WC = Wild card
- LL = Lucky loser
- Alt = Alternate
- SE = Special exempt
- PR = Protected ranking
- ITF = ITF entry
- JE = Junior exempt
- w/o = Walkover
- r = Retired
- d = Defaulted
- SR = Special ranking

=== Finals ===
Quarterfinals
16	(Sweden) Magnus Larsson	2	7^{7}	6
9	(Germany) Rainer Schüttler	6	6^{5}	3
(Brazil) André Sá	6	6
11	(Armenia) Sargis Sargsian	4	4
5	(United States) Michael Chang	5	2
13	(Zimbabwe) Byron Black	7	6
7	(South Africa) Wayne Ferreira	3	6	5
2	(Germany) Tommy Haas	6	2	7

Semifinals
16	(Sweden) Magnus Larsson	3	7^{7}	6
(Brazil) André Sá	6	6^{2}	4
13	(Zimbabwe) Byron Black	7^{7}	7^{7}
2	(Germany) Tommy Haas	6^{2}	6^{5}

Final
16	(Sweden) Magnus Larsson	6	1	6
13	(Zimbabwe) Byron Black	2	6	3

=== Top half ===
==== Section 1 ====
First round
Q	(United States) B MacPhie	6	3	6
(Switzerland) L Manta	3	6	3
(Germany) M Hantschk	3	6^{2}
(Czech Republic) T Zíb	6	7^{7}
Q	(Italy) C Caratti	6	3	4
(Thailand) P Srichaphan	4	6	6
(Canada) S Lareau	6^{10}	6	6^{5}
(Bulgaria) O Stanoytchev	7^{12}	3	7^{7}

Second round
1	(Australia) M Philippoussis	6	6
Q	(United States) B MacPhie	2	4
(Czech Republic) T Zíb	6^{2}	4
16	(Sweden) M Larsson	7^{7}	6
9	(Germany) R Schüttler	5	6	6
(Thailand) P Srichaphan	7	3	3
(Bulgaria) O Stanoytchev	2	3
8	(United States) JM Gambill	6	6

Third round
1	(Australia) M Philippoussis
16	(Sweden) M Larsson	w/o
9	(Germany) R Schüttler	6	1	7^{7}
8	(United States) JM Gambill	2	6	6^{2}

Quarterfinals
16	(Sweden) M Larsson	2	7^{7}	6
9	(Germany) R Schüttler	6	6^{5}	3

==== Section 2 ====
First round
(Haiti) R Agénor	4	1
(Brazil) A Sá	6	6
(France) A Dupuis	6^{5}	1
(Italy) D Sanguinetti	7^{7}	6
LL	(Australia) J Sekulov	4	1
Q	(Israel) H Levy	6	6
(Italy) L Tieleman	6	3	6
WC	(United States) B Bryan	4	6	3

Second round
3	(United States) V Spadea	4	3
(Brazil) A Sá	6	6
(Italy) D Sanguinetti	6	3	3
14	(Australia) R Fromberg	2	6	6
11	(Armenia) S Sargsian	6	6
Q	(Israel) H Levy	2	3
(Italy) L Tieleman	7^{7}	6
6	(United States) J Courier	6^{2}	0

Third round
(Brazil) A Sá	6	7^{8}
14	(Australia) R Fromberg	4	6^{6}
11	(Armenia) S Sargsian	6	6
(Italy) L Tieleman	2	2

Quarterfinals
(Brazil) A Sá	6	6
11	(Armenia) S Sargsian	4	4

=== Bottom half ===
==== Section 3 ====
First round
Q	(The Bahamas) M Knowles	4	3
(Germany) A Pretzsch	6	6
(Argentina) G Etlis	5	1
(Chile) N Massú	7	6
(United States) J Gimelstob	6^{4}	6^{3}
(Argentina) M Rodríguez	7^{7}	7^{7}
WC	(Australia) M Woodforde	6	6
(Spain) J Alonso	4	2

Second round
5	(United States) M Chang	5	6	6
(Germany) A Pretzsch	7	2	1
(Chile) N Massú	5	6^{5}
12	(Argentina) H Gumy	7	7^{7}
13	(Zimbabwe) B Black	6	6
(Argentina) M Rodríguez	2	2
WC	(Australia) M Woodforde	6	5	3
4	(United States) C Woodruff	3	7	6

Third round
5	(United States) M Chang	6	6
12	(Argentina) H Gumy	2	0
13	(Zimbabwe) B Black	6	3	6
4	(United States) C Woodruff	2	6	4

Quarterfinals
5	(United States) M Chang	5	2
13	(Zimbabwe) B Black	7	6

==== Section 4 ====
First round
(Germany) T Behrend	1	5
(Germany) A Popp	6	7
WC	(United States) L Jensen	5	2
(Philippines) C Mamiit	7	6
Q	(United States) R Reneberg	6	6
(United States) P Goldstein	4	2
Q	(United States) J Salzenstein	7^{7}	6
(Sweden) F Jonsson	6^{0}	1

Second round
7	(South Africa) W Ferreira	7	7
(Germany) A Popp	5	5
(Philippines) C Mamiit	7^{7}	6
10	(Belarus) M Mirnyi	6^{2}	2
15	(Sweden) M Tillström	6	6
Q	(United States) R Reneberg	2	2
Q	(United States) J Salzenstein	2	6	4
2	(Germany) T Haas	6	2	6

Third round
7	(South Africa) W Ferreira	2	6	6
(Philippines) C Mamiit	6	2	2
15	(Sweden) M Tillström	2	6	5
2	(Germany) T Haas	6	3	7

Quarterfinals
7	(South Africa) W Ferreira	3	6	5
2	(Germany) T Haas	6	2	7
