= 2000 Gelsor Open Romania – Singles =

Singles
- 2000 Gelsor Open Romania
- 1999 Champion: (Spain) Alberto Martín

Final
- Champion: (Spain) Joan Balcells
- Runner-up: (Germany) Markus Hantschk
- Score: 6–4, 3–6, 7–6^{(7–1)}

Events
| Singles | Doubles |
| ← 1999 · | Gelsor Open Romania | · 2001 → |

Alberto Martín was the defending champion but lost in the quarterfinals to Markus Hantschk.

Joan Balcells won in the final 6–4, 3–6, 7–6^{(7–1)} against Hantschk.

== Seeds ==
A champion seed is indicated in bold text while text in italics indicates the round in which that seed was eliminated.

1. (Argentina) Mariano Puerta (second round)
2. (Morocco) Karim Alami (first round)
3. (Austria) Stefan Koubek (first round)
4. (Spain) Francisco Clavet (first round)
5. (Sweden) Magnus Gustafsson (second round)
6. (Spain) Alberto Martín (quarterfinals)
7. (Spain) Albert Portas (quarterfinals)
8. (Spain) Álex Calatrava (semifinals)

== Draw ==
=== Key ===
- Q = Qualifier
- WC = Wild card
- LL = Lucky loser
- Alt = Alternate
- ITF = ITF entry
- PR = Protected ranking
- SR = Special ranking
- SE = Special exempt
- JE = Junior exempt
- JR = Junior Accelerator Programme entrant
- CO = College Accelerator Programme entrant
- NG = Next Gen Accelerator Program entrant
- w/o = Walkover
- r = Retired
- d = Defaulted

First round
1 | (Argentina) **Mariano Puerta** | **6** | **6**
WC | (Romania) Răzvan Sabău | 2 | 2
Q | (Brazil) Alexandre Simoni | 2 | 4
(Spain) **Joan Balcells** | **6** | **6**
(Argentina) Gastón Etlis | **6** | 3 | 2
(Spain) **Sergi Bruguera** | 4 | **6** | **6**
(Austria) Richard Fromberg | 5 | 3
7 | (Spain) **Albert Portas** | **7** | **6**
3 | (Austria) Stefan Koubek | 5 | 0
(Spain) **Julián Alonso** | **7** | **6**
(Bulgaria) Orlin Stanoytchev | 5 | 3
(Spain) **Galo Blanco** | **7** | **6**
(Germany) Daniel Elsner | **6** | 1 | 0
Q | (Germany) **Marc-Kevin Goellner** | 4 | **6** | **6**
WC | (Romania) Ionuț Moldovan | 5 | 4
5 | (Sweden) **Magnus Gustafsson** | **7** | **6**
6 | (Spain) **Alberto Martín** | **6** | **6**
(Costa Rica) Juan Antonio Marín | 4 | 0
(Belgium) **Christophe Rochus** | **6** | **6**
(Spain) David Sánchez | 2 | 3
(Romania) Adrian Voinea | 3 | 3
(Germany) **Markus Hantschk** | **6** | **6**
WC | (Romania) **Dinu Pescariu** | 4 | **6** | **6**
4 | (Spain) Francisco Clavet | **6** | 3 | 4
8 | (Spain) **Álex Calatrava** | **6** | **6**
(Argentina) Hernán Gumy | 3 | 1
(Spain) Emilio Benfele Álvarez | 6^{3} | 3
(Germany) **Jens Knippschild** | **7^{7}** | **6**
Q | (Germany) Jakub Herm-Zahlava | 1 | 3
Q | (Germany) **Michael Kohlmann** | **6** | **6**
(Brazil) **Fernando Meligeni** | **7** | **6**
2 | (Morocco) Karim Alami | 5 | 3

Second round
1 | (Argentina) Mariano Puerta | 4 | 4
(Spain) **Joan Balcells** | **6** | **6**
(Spain) Sergi Bruguera | 4 | 6^{4}
7 | (Spain) **Albert Portas** | **6** | **7^{7}**
(Spain) Julián Alonso | 2 | 2
(Spain) **Galo Blanco** | **6** | **6**
Q | (Germany) **Marc-Kevin Goellner** | **7** | **7^{7}**
5 | (Sweden) Magnus Gustafsson | 5 | 6^{5}
6 | (Spain) **Alberto Martín** | 0 | **6** | **6**
(Belgium) Christophe Rochus | **6** | 4 | 4
(Germany) **Markus Hantschk** | **6** | **6**
WC | (Romania) Dinu Pescariu | 3 | 2
8 | (Spain) **Álex Calatrava** | **6** | 3 | **7**
(Germany) Jens Knippschild | 2 | **6** | 5
Q | (Germany) Michael Kohlmann | 1 | r
(Brazil) **Fernando Meligeni** | 4

Quarterfinals
(Spain) **Joan Balcells** | **7** | 4 | **6**
7 | (Spain) Albert Portas | 5 | **6** | 2
(Spain) Galo Blanco | 2 | **6** | 4
Q | (Germany) **Marc-Kevin Goellner** | **6** | 3 | **6**
6 | (Spain) Alberto Martín | 1 | **6** | 2
(Germany) **Markus Hantschk** | **6** | 4 | **6**
8 | (Spain) **Álex Calatrava** | **6** | 4
(Brazil) Fernando Meligeni | 3 | 0 | r

Semifinals
(Spain) **Joan Balcells** | **6** | **6**
Q | (Germany) Marc-Kevin Goellner | 4 | 4
(Germany) **Markus Hantschk** | **6** | **6**
8 | (Spain) Álex Calatrava | 4 | 1

Final
(Spain) **Joan Balcells** | **6** | 3 | **7^{7}**
(Germany) Markus Hantschk | 3 | **6** | 6^{1}
