= Joan Balcells =

Spanish tennis player (born 1975)

- Country (sports): Spain
- Residence: Barcelona, Spain
- Born: 20 June 1975 (age 51) Barcelona, Spain
- Height: 1.90 m (6 ft 3 in)
- Turned pro: 1996
- Retired: 2004
- Plays: Right-handed (one-handed backhand)
- Prize money: $815,801

Singles
- Career record: 41–49
- Career titles: 1
- Highest ranking: No. 57 (7 May 2001)

Grand Slam singles results
- Australian Open: 1R (2001, 2002, 2003)
- French Open: 2R (2000, 2001)
- Wimbledon: 1R (2001, 2002)
- US Open: 1R (2001)

Doubles
- Career record: 40–54
- Career titles: 0
- Highest ranking: No. 65 (23 July 2001)

Grand Slam doubles results
- Australian Open: 2R (2001)
- French Open: 2R (2000, 2002)
- Wimbledon: QF (2001)
- US Open: 2R (2000)

Team competitions
- Davis Cup: W (2000)
- Last updated on: 22 April 2022.

Joan Manel Balcells Fornaguera (Catalan pronunciation: [ʒuˈam məˈnɛl βəlˈseʎs fuɾnəˈɣeɾə, ʒuˈam bəlˈseʎs]; born 20 June 1975) is a retired professional tennis player from Spain. He won one ATP Tour singles title in his career and reached the final in Scottsdale in 2002 (losing to Andre Agassi) and the semifinals in 2000 Heineken Open, losing to Michael Chang.

Balcells was born in Barcelona, and played for the Spanish Davis Cup team in 2000, winning the doubles rubber (with Àlex Corretja) in the final against Australia. He retired in 2004. Balcells' style of play was considered unusual for a Spanish player, as he possessed a serve and volley game that involved regularly rushing the net. This was not very common in Spanish tennis by the 1990s and early 2000s.

== ATP career finals ==
=== Singles: 2 (1 title, 1 runner-up) ===
Legend Grand Slam Tournaments (0–0) ATP World Tour Finals (0–0) ATP Masters 1000 Series (0–0) ATP 500 Series (0–0) ATP 250 Series (1–1)	Finals by surface Hard (0–1) Clay (1–0) Grass (0–0) Carpet (0–0)	Finals by setting Outdoors (1–1) Indoors (0–0)

Result	W–L	Date	Tournament	Tier	Surface	Opponent	Score
Win	1–0	Sep 2000	Bucharest, Romania	International Series	Clay	(Germany) Markus Hantschk	6–4, 3–6, 7–6^{(7–1)}
Loss	1–1	Mar 2002	Scottsdale, United States	International Series	Hard	(United States) Andre Agassi	2–6, 6–7^{(2–7)}

=== Doubles: 2 (2 runners-up) ===
Legend Grand Slam Tournaments (0–0) ATP World Tour Finals (0–0) ATP Masters 1000 Series (0–0) ATP 500 Series (0–0) ATP 250 Series (0–2)	Finals by surface Hard (0–1) Clay (0–1) Grass (0–0) Carpet (0–0)	Finals by setting Outdoors (0–2) Indoors (0–0)

Result	W–L	Date	Tournament	Tier	Surface	Partner	Opponents	Score
Loss	0–1	Mar 2000	Bogotá, Colombia	International Series	Clay	(Colombia) Mauricio Hadad	(Argentina) Pablo Albano (Argentina) Lucas Arnold Ker	6–7^{(4–7)}, 6–1, 2–6
Loss	0–2	Jan 2001	Doha, Qatar	International Series	Hard	(Russia) Andrei Olhovskiy	(The Bahamas) Mark Knowles (Canada) Daniel Nestor	3–6, 1–6

== ATP Challenger and ITF Futures finals ==
=== Singles: 2 (0–2) ===
Legend ATP Challenger (0–2) ITF Futures (0–0)	Finals by surface Hard (0–0) Clay (0–2) Grass (0–0) Carpet (0–0)

Result	W–L	Date	Tournament	Tier	Surface	Opponent	Score
Loss	0-1	May 2000	Ljubljana, Slovenia	Challenger	Clay	(Germany) Oliver Gross	6–4, 1–6, 6–7^{(3–7)}
Loss	0-2	May 2002	Ljubljana, Slovenia	Challenger	Clay	(France) Arnaud Di Pasquale	4–6, 3–6

=== Doubles: 12 (6–6) ===
Legend ATP Challenger (6–6) ITF Futures (0–0)	Finals by surface Hard (1–0) Clay (5–6) Grass (0–0) Carpet (0–0)

Result	W–L	Date	Tournament	Tier	Surface	Partner	Opponents	Score
Loss	0-1	May 1997	Bratislava, Slovakia	Challenger	Clay	(United States) Devin Bowen	(United States) Jared Palmer (South Africa) Christo van Rensburg	6–4, 3–6, 5–7
Win	1-1	Apr 1998	Barletta, Italy	Challenger	Clay	(Spain) Juan Ignacio Carrasco	(Austria) Thomas Strengberger (Socialist Federal Republic of Yugoslavia) Dušan Vemić	7–6^{(7–4)}, 6–3
Win	2-1	Apr 1998	Prague, Czech Republic	Challenger	Clay	(Socialist Federal Republic of Yugoslavia) Nenad Zimonjić	(Czech Republic) Jiří Novák (Czech Republic) Radek Štěpánek	7–6, 7–6
Loss	2-2	Jun 1998	Braunschweig, Germany	Challenger	Clay	(Portugal) Emanuel Couto	(Spain) Tomás Carbonell (Spain) Francisco Roig	2–6, 6–7
Win	3-2	May 1999	Espinho, Portugal	Challenger	Clay	(Argentina) Gastón Etlis	(Israel) Noam Behr (Israel) Eyal Ran	6–3, 6–2
Win	4-2	Sep 1999	Freudenstadt, Germany	Challenger	Clay	(Austria) Thomas Strengberger	(Czech Republic) Michal Tabara (Czech Republic) Robin Vik	4–6, 6–2, 6–3
Win	5-2	Mar 2000	Salinas, Ecuador	Challenger	Hard	(Colombia) Mauricio Hadad	(Spain) Emilio Benfele Álvarez (Spain) Álex Calatrava	walkover
Loss	5-3	Nov 2000	Santiago, Chile	Challenger	Clay	(Spain) Germán Puentes Alcañiz	(Georgia (country)) Irakli Labadze (Socialist Federal Republic of Yugoslavia) Dušan Vemić	3–6, 4–6
Loss	5-4	Nov 2000	Montevideo, Uruguay	Challenger	Clay	(Spain) Germán Puentes Alcañiz	(Argentina) Lucas Arnold Ker (Argentina) Gastón Etlis	4–6, 4–6
Loss	5-5	Sep 2002	Freudenstadt, Germany	Challenger	Clay	(Russia) Yuri Schukin	(Argentina) Diego del Río (Argentina) Leonardo Olguín	6–7^{(2–7)}, 4–6
Loss	5-6	Apr 2003	San Remo, Italy	Challenger	Clay	(Spain) Juan Albert Viloca	(Italy) Daniele Bracciali (Israel) Amir Hadad	2–6, 4–6
Win	6-6	Jun 2003	Lugano, Switzerland	Challenger	Clay	(Spain) Juan Albert Viloca	(Spain) Álex López Morón (Argentina) Andrés Schneiter	6–4, 6–4

== Performance timelines ==
Key
W	F	SF	QF	#R	RR	Q#	DNQ	A	NH

(W) winner; (F) finalist; (SF) semifinalist; (QF) quarterfinalist; (#R) rounds 4, 3, 2, 1; (RR) round-robin stage; (Q#) qualification round; (DNQ) did not qualify; (A) absent; (NH) not held; (SR) strike rate (events won / competed); (W–L) win–loss record.

=== Singles ===
Tournament	1997	1998	1999	2000	2001	2002	2003	SR	W–L	Win %
Grand Slam tournaments
Australian Open	A	A	Q3	A	1R	1R	1R	0 / 3	0–3	0%
French Open	Q2	Q2	A	2R	2R	1R	Q3	0 / 3	2–3	40%
Wimbledon	Q1	A	A	A	1R	1R	A	0 / 2	0–2	0%
US Open	A	A	A	Q1	1R	A	A	0 / 1	0–1	0%
Win–loss	0–0	0–0	0–0	1–1	1–4	0–3	0–1	0 / 9	2–9	18%
ATP World Tour Masters 1000
Miami	A	A	A	Q1	3R	1R	A	0 / 2	2–2	50%
Monte Carlo	A	A	A	A	1R	Q1	Q2	0 / 1	0–1	0%
Hamburg	A	A	A	A	1R	A	A	0 / 1	0–1	0%
Win–loss	0–0	0–0	0–0	0–0	2–3	0–1	0–0	0 / 4	2–4	33%

=== Doubles ===
Tournament	1999	2000	2001	2002	SR	W–L	Win %
Grand Slam tournaments
Australian Open	1R	1R	2R	1R	0 / 4	1–4	20%
French Open	A	2R	1R	2R	0 / 3	2–3	40%
Wimbledon	A	A	QF	1R	0 / 2	3–2	60%
US Open	A	2R	1R	A	0 / 2	1–2	33%
Win–loss	0–1	2–3	4–4	1–3	0 / 11	7–11	39%
ATP World Tour Masters 1000
Miami	A	1R	1R	A	0 / 2	0–2	0%
Monte Carlo	A	A	1R	A	0 / 1	0–1	0%
Hamburg	A	A	Q2	A	0 / 0	0–0	–
Win–loss	0–0	0–1	0–2	0–0	0 / 3	0–3	0%

== Top 10 wins ==
#	Player	Rank	Event	Surface	Rd	Score
2001
1.	(Russia) Marat Safin	2	Miami, United States	Hard	2R	4–6, 6–4, 6–3
2.	(Russia) Marat Safin	2	Gstaad, Switzerland	Clay	1R	6–4, 6–7^{(4–7)}, 6–4
