= Markus Hantschk =

German tennis player

- Country (sports): Germany
- Residence: Böbrach, Germany
- Born: 19 November 1977 (age 48) Dachau, West Germany
- Height: 1.87 m (6 ft 2 in)
- Turned pro: 1996
- Retired: 2006
- Plays: Right-handed (one-handed backhand)
- Prize money: $514,852

Singles
- Career record: 26–41
- Career titles: 0
- Highest ranking: No. 71 (30 October 2000)

Grand Slam singles results
- Australian Open: 1R (2001)
- French Open: 2R (1999, 2000)
- Wimbledon: 1R (2000)
- US Open: 1R (2000)

Doubles
- Career record: 0–0
- Career titles: 0
- Highest ranking: No. 348 (3 August 1998)
- Last updated on: 23 April 2022.

Markus Ferdinand Hantschk (German pronunciation: [ˈmaʁkʊs ˈhantʃk]; born 19 November 1977) is a German former tennis player who was active between 1996 and 2006. He reached two singles finals in ATP tournaments, both in 2000.

== ATP career finals ==
=== Singles: 2 (2 runners-up) ===
| Legend Grand Slam Tournaments (0–0) ATP World Tour Finals (0–0) ATP Masters 1000 Series (0–0) ATP 500 Series (0–0) ATP 250 Series (0–2) | Finals by surface Hard (0–1) Clay (0–1) Grass (0–0) Carpet (0–0) | Finals by setting Outdoors (0–2) Indoors (0–0) |

| Result | W–L | Date | Tournament | Tier | Surface | Opponent | Score |
|---|---|---|---|---|---|---|---|
| Loss | 0–1 | Jan 2000 | Chennai, India | International Series | Hard | (France) Jérôme Golmard | 3–6, 7–6^{(8–6)}, 3–6 |
| Loss | 0–2 | Sep 2000 | Bucharest, Romania | International Series | Clay | (Spain) Juan Balcells | 4–6, 6–4, 6–7^{(1–7)} |

== ATP Challenger and ITF Futures finals ==
=== Singles: 8 (2–6) ===
| Legend ATP Challenger (1–5) ITF Futures (1–1) | Finals by surface Hard (0–1) Clay (0–3) Grass (0–0) Carpet (2–2) |

| Result | W–L | Date | Tournament | Tier | Surface | Opponent | Score |
|---|---|---|---|---|---|---|---|
| Loss | 0-1 | Mar 1998 | Italy F1, Cagliari | Futures | Clay | (Spain) David Caballero-Garcia | 1–6, 6–1, 6–7 |
| Loss | 0-2 | Mar 1998 | Italy F2, Sassari | Futures | Clay | (Finland) Kim Tiilikainen | 3–6, 2–6 |
| Loss | 0-3 | May 1998 | Dresden, Germany | Challenger | Clay | (Germany) Dirk Dier | 6–0, 1–6, 4–6 |
| Loss | 0-4 | Jan 1999 | Heilbronn, Germany | Challenger | Carpet | (Italy) Laurence Tieleman | 2–6, 7–5, 3–6 |
| Win | 1-4 | Mar 1999 | Magdeburg, Germany | Challenger | Carpet | (Germany) Axel Pretzsch | 3–6, 7–6, 6–4 |
| Loss | 1-5 | Feb 2003 | Belgrade, Yugoslavia | Challenger | Carpet | (Netherlands) Dennis Van Scheppingen | 5–7, 3–6 |
| Loss | 1-6 | Nov 2003 | Puebla, Mexico | Challenger | Hard | (Brazil) Ricardo Mello | 6–7^{(5–7)}, 4–6 |
| Win | 2-6 | Feb 2005 | Germany F5, Mettmann | Futures | Carpet | (Germany) Sebastian Rieschick | 1–6, 6–3, 6–4 |

=== Doubles: 3 (1–2) ===
| Legend ATP Challenger (0–2) ITF Futures (1–0) | Finals by surface Hard (0–0) Clay (1–1) Grass (0–0) Carpet (0–1) |

| Result | W–L | Date | Tournament | Tier | Surface | Partner | Opponents | Score |
|---|---|---|---|---|---|---|---|---|
| Loss | 0-1 | Nov 1997 | Neumünster, Germany | Challenger | Carpet | (Germany) Lars Burgsmüller | (South Africa) John-Laffnie de Jager (South Africa) Chris Haggard | 3–6, 1–6 |
| Win | 1-1 | Mar 1998 | Italy F2, Sassari | Futures | Clay | (Austria) Johannes Unterberger | (Andorra) Joan Jimenez-Guerra (Finland) Kim Tiilikainen | 7–6, 6–3 |
| Loss | 1-2 | Apr 2003 | San Luis Potosí, Mexico | Challenger | Clay | (Austria) Alexander Peya | (United States) Alex Bogomolov Jr (Canada) Frédéric Niemeyer | 4–6, 6–7^{(5–7)} |

== Performance timeline ==
Key
| W | F | SF | QF | #R | RR | Q# | DNQ | A | NH |

(W) winner; (F) finalist; (SF) semifinalist; (QF) quarterfinalist; (#R) rounds 4, 3, 2, 1; (RR) round-robin stage; (Q#) qualification round; (DNQ) did not qualify; (A) absent; (NH) not held; (SR) strike rate (events won / competed); (W–L) win–loss record.

=== Singles ===
| Tournament | 1998 | 1999 | 2000 | 2001 | 2002 | 2003 | 2004 | SR | W–L | Win % |
|---|---|---|---|---|---|---|---|---|---|---|
Grand Slam tournaments
| Australian Open | Q2 | Q1 | Q2 | 1R | Q3 | Q2 | Q1 | 0 / 1 | 0–1 | 0% |
| French Open | A | 2R | 2R | Q1 | Q2 | Q2 | Q2 | 0 / 2 | 2–2 | 50% |
| Wimbledon | A | A | 1R | A | A | A | Q2 | 0 / 1 | 0–1 | 0% |
| US Open | A | A | 1R | A | Q1 | A | A | 0 / 1 | 0–1 | 0% |
| Win–loss | 0–0 | 1–1 | 1–3 | 0–1 | 0–0 | 0–0 | 0–0 | 0 / 5 | 2–5 | 29% |
ATP World Tour Masters 1000
| Rome | A | Q1 | A | Q1 | A | A | A | 0 / 0 | 0–0 | – |
| Hamburg | A | 1R | A | A | Q1 | 1R | Q1 | 0 / 2 | 0–2 | 0% |
| Win–loss | 0–0 | 0–1 | 0–0 | 0–0 | 0–0 | 0–1 | 0–0 | 0 / 2 | 0–2 | 0% |
