= Devin Bowen =

American tennis player

- Country (sports): United States
- Residence: Huntington Beach, California, United States
- Born: May 18, 1972 (age 52); Newport Beach, California, United States
- Height: 1.83 m (6 ft 0 in)
- Turned pro: 1994
- Plays: Right-handed
- Prize money: US$ 466,878

Singles
- Career record: 0-0
- Career titles: 0; 0 Challenger, 0 Futures
- Highest ranking: 635 (26 February 1996)

Doubles
- Career record: 89–157
- Career titles: 1; 5 Challenger, 0 Futures
- Highest ranking: 39 (11 August 2003)

Grand Slam doubles results
- Australian Open: 3R (2002, 2003)
- French Open: 2R (1999, 2003)
- Wimbledon: 2R (1999, 2003)
- US Open: QF (2001, 2002)

Grand Slam mixed doubles results
- French Open: 1R (1999, 2000)
- Wimbledon: 2R (1998, 2000, 2003)
- Last updated on: 21 June 2021.

Devin Bowen (born May 18, 1972) is an American former ATP World Tour professional tennis player. A doubles specialist, he reached a career high doubles ranking of world No. 39, in 2003.

== Performance timelines ==
Key
W	F	SF	QF	#R	RR	Q#	DNQ	A	NH

(W) winner; (F) finalist; (SF) semifinalist; (QF) quarterfinalist; (#R) rounds 4, 3, 2, 1; (RR) round-robin stage; (Q#) qualification round; (DNQ) did not qualify; (A) absent; (NH) not held; (SR) strike rate (events won / competed); (W–L) win–loss record.

=== Doubles ===
Tournament	1995	1996	1997	1998	1999	2000	2001	2002	2003	2004	SR	W–L	Win %
Grand Slam tournaments
Australian Open	A	A	A	1R	1R	2R	1R	3R	3R	1R	0 / 7	5–7	42%
French Open	A	A	A	1R	2R	1R	1R	1R	2R	1R	0 / 7	2–7	22%
Wimbledon	A	A	A	1R	2R	1R	1R	1R	2R	1R	0 / 7	2–7	22%
US Open	A	A	A	2R	1R	1R	QF	QF	1R	A	0 / 6	7–6	54%
Win–loss	0–0	0–0	0–0	1–4	2–4	1–4	3–4	5–4	4–4	0–3	0 / 27	16–27	37%
ATP Tour Masters 1000
Indian Wells Masters	A	A	A	A	Q1	A	A	1R	A	1R	0 / 2	0–2	0%
Miami Open	A	A	A	3R	1R	1R	Q1	1R	A	A	0 / 4	2–4	0%
Monte Carlo	A	A	A	A	A	2R	Q1	A	A	A	0 / 1	1–1	50%
Hamburg	A	A	A	A	A	2R	A	A	A	A	0 / 1	1–1	50%
Canada Masters	1R	A	A	A	A	A	A	1R	A	A	0 / 2	0–2	0%
Paris Masters	A	A	A	A	Q1	A	A	A	A	A	0 / 0	0–0	–
Win–loss	0–1	0–0	0–0	2–1	0–1	2–3	0–0	0–3	0–0	0–1	0 / 10	4–10	29%

=== Mixed doubles ===
Tournament	1998	1999	2000	2001	2002	2003	SR	W–L	Win %
Grand Slam tournaments
Australian Open	A	A	A	A	A	A	0 / 0	0–0	–
French Open	A	1R	1R	A	A	A	0 / 2	0–2	0%
Wimbledon	2R	1R	2R	1R	1R	2R	0 / 6	3–6	33%
US Open	A	A	A	A	A	A	0 / 0	0–0	–
Win–loss	1–1	0–2	1–2	0–1	0–1	1–1	0 / 8	3–8	27%

== ATP career finals ==
=== Doubles: 5 (1 title, 4 runner-ups) ===
Legend (doubles) Grand Slam (0–0) ATP World Tour Finals (0–0) ATP Masters Series (0–0) ATP Championship Series (0–0) ATP World Series (1–4)	Finals by surface Hard (0–0) Clay (1–4) Grass (0–0) Carpet (0–0)	Finals by setting Outdoor (1–4) Indoor (0–0)

Result	W–L	Date	Tournament	Tier	Surface	Partner	Opponents	Score
Loss	0–1	Nov 1998	Santiago, Chile	World Series	Clay	(Italy) Massimo Bertolini	(Argentina) Sebastián Prieto (Argentina) Mariano Hood	6–7, 7–6, 6–7
Loss	0–2	Aug 1999	Amsterdam, Netherlands	World Series	Clay	(Israel) Eyal Ran	(Netherlands) Paul Haarhuis (Netherlands) Sjeng Schalken	3–6, 2–6
Loss	0–3	Sep 2000	Bucharest, Romania	International Series	Clay	(Argentina) Mariano Hood	(Spain) Alberto Martín (Israel) Eyal Ran	6–7^{(4–7)}, 1–6
Loss	0–4	Apr 2003	Casablanca, Morocco	International Series	Clay	(Australia) Ashley Fisher	(Czech Republic) František Čermák (Czech Republic) Leoš Friedl	3–6, 5–7
Win	1–4	Jul 2003	Amersfoort, Netherlands	International Series	Clay	(Australia) Ashley Fisher	(Brazil) André Sá (South Africa) Chris Haggard	6–0, 6–4

== ATP Challenger and ITF Futures finals ==
=== Doubles: 15 (5–10) ===
Legend ATP Challenger (5–10) ITF Futures (0–0)	Finals by surface Hard (1–1) Clay (4–9) Grass (0–0) Carpet (0–0)

Result	W–L	Date	Tournament	Tier	Surface	Partner	Opponents	Score
Loss	0–1	Aug 1996	Poznań, Poland	Challenger	Clay	(Mexico) David Roditi	(Italy) Cristian Brandi (Italy) Filippo Messori	3–6, 4–6
Win	1–1	Apr 1997	Split, Croatia	Challenger	Clay	(Romania) Dinu-Mihai Pescariu	(Mexico) David Roditi (United States) Trey Phillips	7–6, 6–3
Loss	1–2	Apr 1997	Prague, Czech Republic	Challenger	Clay	(Finland) Tuomas Ketola	(India) Mahesh Bhupathi (India) Leander Paes	4–6, 0–6
Loss	1–3	May 1997	Bratislava, Slovakia	Challenger	Clay	(Spain) Juan-Manuel Balcells	(United States) Jared Palmer (South Africa) Christo van Rensburg	6–4, 3–6, 5–7
Loss	1–4	Oct 1997	Mallorca, Spain	Challenger	Clay	(Egypt) Tamer El Sawy	(Italy) Massimo Ardinghi (France) Guillaume Marx	3–6, 2–6
Win	2–4	Apr 1998	Napoli, Italy	Challenger	Clay	(Italy) Massimo Bertolini	(Egypt) Tamer El Sawy (Hungary) Gábor Köves	7–6, 6–2
Win	3–4	Apr 1998	Nice, France	Challenger	Clay	(Argentina) Mariano Hood	(Argentina) Mariano Puerta (Brazil) André Sá	7–5, 3–6, 6–4
Loss	3–5	Jun 1999	Prostějov, Czech Republic	Challenger	Clay	(Israel) Eyal Ran	(United States) Eric Taino (Romania) Dinu Pescariu	3–6, 3–6
Loss	3–6	Jun 2000	Furth, Germany	Challenger	Clay	(United States) Brandon Coupe	(Spain) Eduardo Nicolás Espin (Spain) Germán Puentes Alcañiz	4–6, 2–6
Loss	3–7	Dec 2000	San José, Costa Rica	Challenger	Hard	(United States) Brandon Coupe	(Chile) Adrián García (Argentina) Guillermo Cañas	6–7^{(5–7)}, 1–6
Loss	3–8	Jun 2001	Prostějov, Czech Republic	Challenger	Clay	(Argentina) Mariano Hood	(Italy) Andrea Gaudenzi (Netherlands) Sander Groen	6–7^{(6–8)}, 4–6
Loss	3–9	Aug 2001	San Marino, San Marino	Challenger	Clay	(North Macedonia) Aleksandar Kitinov	(Czech Republic) František Čermák (Czech Republic) David Škoch	5–7, 4–6
Loss	3–10	Apr 2002	Tunis, Tunisia	Challenger	Clay	(Australia) Ashley Fisher	(Spain) Álex López Morón (Argentina) Andrés Schneiter	4–6, 6–7^{(6–8)}
Win	4–10	Nov 2003	Waco, United States	Challenger	Hard	(Australia) Ashley Fisher	(United States) KJ Hippensteel (United States) Ryan Haviland	6–4, 7–6^{(7–4)}
Win	5–10	May 2004	Košice, Slovakia	Challenger	Clay	(Australia) Peter Luczak	(Czech Republic) Jan Hernych (Czech Republic) Petr Kralert	6–2, 7–6^{(8–6)}
