= 1999 Heineken Open Shanghai – Singles =

Singles
- 1999 Heineken Open Shanghai

Final
- Champion: (Sweden) Magnus Norman
- Runner-up: (Chile) Marcelo Ríos
- Score: 2–6, 6–3, 7–5

Details
- Draw: 32 (3WC/4Q/1LL)
- Seeds: 8

Events
Singles	Doubles
← 1998 ·	Kingfisher Airlines Tennis Open	· 2000 →

Michael Chang was the defending champion, but lost in the semifinals to Magnus Norman.

Norman won the title by defeating Marcelo Ríos 2–6, 6–3, 7–5 in the final.

== Seeds ==
1. (Chile) Marcelo Ríos (final)
2. (Sweden) Magnus Norman (champion)
3. (Netherlands) Sjeng Schalken (first round)
4. (United States) Jan-Michael Gambill (quarterfinals)
5. (Sweden) Jonas Björkman (semifinals)
6. (United States) Michael Chang (semifinals)
7. (Canada) Daniel Nestor (first round)
8. (n/a)

== Draw ==
=== Key ===
- Q = Qualifier
- WC = Wild card
- LL = Lucky loser
- Alt = Alternate
- SE = Special exempt
- PR = Protected ranking
- ITF = ITF entry
- JE = Junior exempt
- w/o = Walkover
- r = Retired
- d = Defaulted
- SR = Special ranking

=== Finals ===
Semifinals
1	(Chile) Marcelo Ríos	6	6
5	(Sweden) Jonas Björkman	4	1
6	(United States) Michael Chang	6	4	2
2	(Sweden) Magnus Norman	0	6	6

Final
1	(Chile) Marcelo Ríos	6	3	5
2	(Sweden) Magnus Norman	2	6	7

=== Top half ===
First round
1	(Chile) M Ríos	6	6
(Italy) L Tieleman	2	1
(Croatia) I Ljubičić	7^{7}	6
(United States) J Gimelstob	6^{1}	3
(Paraguay) R Delgado	3	6	1
Q	(South Korea) H-t Lee	6	4	6
(Denmark) K Carlsen	6^{5}	6^{4}
LL	(Australia) T Woodbridge	7^{7}	7^{7}
3	(Netherlands) S Schalken	4	4
Q	(Sweden) A Vinciguerra	6	6
(Sweden) F Jonsson	3	6	2
(Philippines) C Mamiit	6	3	6
(Germany) L Burgsmüller	4	7^{7}	6
(Canada) S Lareau	6	6^{5}	3
(United States) P Goldstein	4	2
5	(Sweden) J Björkman	6	6

Second round
1	(Chile) M Ríos	6	6
(Croatia) I Ljubičić	3	2
Q	(South Korea) H-t Lee	7	2	6^{8}
LL	(Australia) T Woodbridge	5	6	7^{10}
Q	(Sweden) A Vinciguerra	6	6
(Philippines) C Mamiit	1	3
(Germany) L Burgsmüller	5	6	2
5	(Sweden) J Björkman	7	3	6

Quarterfinals
1	(Chile) M Ríos	6	6
LL	(Australia) T Woodbridge	3	3
Q	(Sweden) A Vinciguerra	3	6	4
5	(Sweden) J Björkman	6	3	6

Semifinals
1	(Chile) M Ríos	6	6
5	(Sweden) J Björkman	4	1

=== Bottom half ===
First round
6	(United States) M Chang	7	7^{7}
Q	(United States) B MacPhie	5	6^{5}
(Zimbabwe) B Black	3	6	4
(Belarus) M Mirnyi	6	2	6
(France) A Dupuis	6^{5}	7^{7}	7^{8}
(Australia) W Arthurs	7^{7}	6^{5}	6^{6}
WC	(China) Y Wang	0	1
4	(United States) JM Gambill	6	6
7	(Canada) D Nestor	4	4
WC	(Thailand) P Srichaphan	6	6
(Netherlands) J van Lottum	6	6
WC	(China) B Zhu	4	2
(Netherlands) P Wessels	6	2	6
Q	(France) S Huet	2	6	3
(Finland) T Ketola	1	3
2	(Sweden) M Norman	6	6

Second round
6	(United States) M Chang	6	7
(Belarus) M Mirnyi	4	5
(France) A Dupuis	3	4
4	(United States) JM Gambill	6	6
WC	(Thailand) P Srichaphan	6	6
(Netherlands) J van Lottum	3	2
(Netherlands) P Wessels	7^{7}	5	6^{3}
2	(Sweden) M Norman	6^{4}	7	7^{7}

Quarterfinals
6	(United States) M Chang	6	7
4	(United States) JM Gambill	3	5
WC	(Thailand) P Srichaphan	6^{4}	1
2	(Sweden) M Norman	7^{7}	6

Semifinals
6	(United States) M Chang	6	4	2
2	(Sweden) M Norman	0	6	6
