= 2000 Heineken Open Shanghai =

- Date: 16–22 October
- Edition: 5th
- Category: International Series
- Draw: 32S / 16D
- Prize money: $350,000
- Surface: Hard / outdoor
- Location: Shanghai, China

Champions

Singles
- (Sweden) Magnus Norman

Doubles
- (Netherlands) Paul Haarhuis / (Netherlands) Sjeng Schalken
← 1999 ·	Heineken Open Shanghai	· 2001 →

The 2000 Heineken Open Shanghai was a men's tennis tournament played on outdoor hard courts in Shanghai, China that was part of the International Series of the 2000 ATP Tour. It was the fifth edition of the tournament and ran from 16 October through 22 October 2000. First-seeded Magnus Norman won the singles title.

== Finals ==
=== Singles ===
(Sweden) Magnus Norman defeated (Netherlands) Sjeng Schalken 6–4, 4–6, 6–3

- It was Norman's 5th singles title of the year and the 12th and last of his career.

=== Doubles ===
(Netherlands) Paul Haarhuis / (Netherlands) Sjeng Schalken defeated (Czech Republic) Petr Pála / (Czech Republic) Pavel Vízner 6–2, 3–6, 6–4

- It was Haarhuis's 1st title for the year and the 49th of his career. It was Schalken's only title of the year and the 4th of his career.
