= 1999 Heineken Open Shanghai – Doubles =

Doubles
- 1999 Heineken Open Shanghai

Final
- Champions: (Canada) Sébastien Lareau (Canada) Daniel Nestor
- Runners-up: (Australia) Todd Woodbridge (Australia) Mark Woodforde
- Score: 7–5, 6–3

Details
- Draw: 16 (3WC/1Q)
- Seeds: 4

Events
Singles	Doubles
← 1998 ·	Kingfisher Airlines Tennis Open	· 2000 →

Mahesh Bhupathi and Leander Paes were the defending champions, but were forced to withdraw before their quarterfinal match against Neville Godwin and Grant Stafford.

Sébastien Lareau and Daniel Nestor won the title by defeating Todd Woodbridge and Mark Woodforde 7–5, 6–3 in the final.

== Seeds ==
1. (India) Mahesh Bhupathi / (India) Leander Paes (quarterfinals, withdrew)
2. (Australia) Todd Woodbridge / (Australia) Mark Woodforde (final)
3. (Canada) Sébastien Lareau / (Canada) Daniel Nestor (champions)
4. (Australia) Wayne Arthurs / (Australia) Andrew Kratzmann (first round)

== Draw ==
=== Key ===
- Q = Qualifier
- WC = Wild card
- LL = Lucky loser
- Alt = Alternate
- SE = Special exempt
- PR = Protected ranking
- ITF = ITF entry
- JE = Junior exempt
- w/o = Walkover
- r = Retired
- d = Defaulted
- SR = Special ranking

=== Draw ===
First round
1	(India) M Bhupathi (India) L Paes	6	6
WC	(China) S Li (China) J Yang	2	1
(Australia) B Ellwood (Australia) M Tebbutt	6^{5}	4
Q	(South Africa) N Godwin (South Africa) G Stafford	7^{7}	6
3	(Canada) S Lareau (Canada) D Nestor	6	6
WC	(Argentina) L Lobo (Chile) M Ríos	4	1
WC	(United States) M Chang (Thailand) P Srichaphan	2	0
(Australia) M Hill (United States) S Humphries	6	6
(United States) J Gimelstob (United States) J Waite	3	6^{6}
(Zimbabwe) B Black (United States) B MacPhie	6	7^{8}
(South Africa) M Barnard (United States) JM Gambill	6	6
4	(Australia) W Arthurs (Australia) A Kratzmann	3	4
(Belarus) M Mirnyi (Philippines) E Taino	6	4	7^{9}
(United States) B Bryan (United States) M Bryan	4	6	6^{7}
(United Kingdom) N Broad (Australia) P Tramacchi	6	4	1
2	(Australia) T Woodbridge (Australia) M Woodforde	4	6	6

Quarterfinals
1	(India) M Bhupathi (India) L Paes
Q	(South Africa) N Godwin (South Africa) G Stafford	w/o
3	(Canada) S Lareau (Canada) D Nestor	3	7	6
(Australia) M Hill (United States) S Humphries	6	5	3
(Zimbabwe) B Black (United States) B MacPhie	6	6
(South Africa) M Barnard (United States) JM Gambill	4	3
(Belarus) M Mirnyi (Philippines) E Taino	2	2
2	(Australia) T Woodbridge (Australia) M Woodforde	6	6

Semifinals
Q	(South Africa) N Godwin (South Africa) G Stafford	6^{8}	6^{2}
3	(Canada) S Lareau (Canada) D Nestor	7^{10}	7^{7}
(Zimbabwe) B Black (United States) B MacPhie	6^{7}	2
2	(Australia) T Woodbridge (Australia) M Woodforde	7^{9}	6

Final
3	(Canada) S Lareau (Canada) D Nestor	7	6
2	(Australia) T Woodbridge (Australia) M Woodforde	5	3
