= 1999 Heineken Open Shanghai =

- Date: 4–11 October
- Edition: 4th
- Category: World Series
- Draw: 32S / 16D
- Prize money: $325,000
- Surface: Hard / outdoor
- Location: Shanghai, China

Champions

Singles
- (Sweden) Magnus Norman

Doubles
- (Canada) Sébastien Lareau / (Canada) Daniel Nestor
← 1998 ·	Heineken Open Shanghai	· 2000 →

The 1999 Heineken Open Shanghai was a men's tennis tournament played on outdoor hard courts in Shanghai, China that was part of the World Series of the 1999 ATP Tour. It was the fourth edition of the tournament and was held from 4 October through 11 October 1999. Second-seeded Magnus Norman won the singles title.

== Finals ==
=== Singles ===
(Sweden) Magnus Norman defeated (Chile) Marcelo Ríos 2–6, 6–3, 7–5

- It was Norman's 5th singles title of the year and the 7th of his career.

=== Doubles ===
(Canada) Sébastien Lareau / (Canada) Daniel Nestor defeated (Australia) Todd Woodbridge / (Australia) Mark Woodforde 7–5, 6–3

- It was Lareau's 5th doubles title of the year and the 12th of his career. It was Nestor's 2nd doubles title of the year and the 12th of his career.
