= 2000 Heineken Open Shanghai – Doubles =

Doubles
- 2000 Heineken Open Shanghai

Final
- Champions: (Netherlands) Paul Haarhuis (Netherlands) Sjeng Schalken
- Runners-up: (Czech Republic) Petr Pála (Czech Republic) Pavel Vízner
- Score: 6–2, 3–6, 6–4

Events
Singles	Doubles
- Heineken Open Shanghai

Sébastien Lareau and Daniel Nestor were the defending champions, but did not compete this year.

Paul Haarhuis and Sjeng Schalken won the title by defeating Petr Pála and Pavel Vízner 6–2, 3–6, 6–4 in the final.

== Seeds ==
1. (Czech Republic) Tomáš Cibulec / (Czech Republic) Leoš Friedl (semifinals)
2. (Japan) Thomas Shimada / (South Africa) Myles Wakefield (semifinals)
3. (Australia) Paul Kilderry / (Australia) Peter Tramacchi (first round)
4. (Australia) Michael Hill / (United States) Jonathan Stark (quarterfinals)

== Draw ==
Key

- Q = Qualifier
- WC = Wild card
- LL = Lucky loser
- Alt = Alternate
- ITF = ITF entry
- PR = Protected ranking
- SR = Special ranking
- SE = Special exempt
- JE = Junior exempt
- JR = Junior Accelerator Programme entrant
- CO = College Accelerator Programme entrant
- NG = Next Gen Accelerator Program entrant
- w/o = Walkover
- r = Retired
- d = Defaulted

=== Draw ===
First round
1	(Czech Republic) T Cibulec (Czech Republic) L Friedl	6	6
WC	(Chile) N Massú (Brazil) A Sá	1	3
LL	(Belgium) C Rochus (Belgium) O Rochus	4	6	6^{7}
(United States) P Goldstein (United States) J Thomas	6	3	7^{9}
3	(Australia) P Kilderry (Australia) P Tramacchi	4	4
(Netherlands) P Haarhuis (Netherlands) S Schalken	6	6
(United States) K Kim (United States) E Taino	7^{9}	6
(United States) D Bowen (United States) J Waite	6^{7}	3
WC	(China) R Xu (China) B Zhu	7	6^{4}	3
(Czech Republic) P Pála (Czech Republic) P Vízner	5	7^{7}	6
(South Africa) B Haygarth (Israel) H Levy	1	4
4	(Australia) M Hill (United States) J Stark	6	6
WC	(United States) T Dent (United States) P King	4	4
(Italy) A Gaudenzi (Russia) A Stoliarov	6	6
Q	(Switzerland) G Bastl (Italy) G Galimberti	6^{6}	6^{4}
2	(Japan) T Shimada (South Africa) M Wakefield	7^{8}	7^{7}

Quarterfinals
1	(Czech Republic) T Cibulec (Czech Republic) L Friedl	6^{4}	7^{7}	7
(United States) P Goldstein (United States) J Thomas	7^{7}	6^{4}	5
(Netherlands) P Haarhuis (Netherlands) S Schalken	6^{3}	6	6
(United States) K Kim (United States) E Taino	7^{7}	2	4
(Czech Republic) P Pála (Czech Republic) P Vízner	6	6
4	(Australia) M Hill (United States) J Stark	2	4
(Italy) A Gaudenzi (Russia) A Stoliarov	4	4
2	(Japan) T Shimada (South Africa) M Wakefield	6	6

Semifinals
1	(Czech Republic) T Cibulec (Czech Republic) L Friedl	4	4
(Netherlands) P Haarhuis (Netherlands) S Schalken	6	6
(Czech Republic) P Pála (Czech Republic) P Vízner	6	6
2	(Japan) T Shimada (South Africa) M Wakefield	3	4

Final
(Netherlands) P Haarhuis (Netherlands) S Schalken	6	3	6
(Czech Republic) P Pála (Czech Republic) P Vízner	2	6	4
