= 1998 Shanghai Open – Singles =

Singles
- 1998 Shanghai Open

Final
- Champion: (United States) Michael Chang
- Runner-up: (Croatia) Goran Ivanišević
- Score: 4–6, 6–1, 6–2

Events
Singles	Doubles
← 1997 ·	Shanghai Open	· 1999 →

The 1998 Shanghai Open was a men's tennis tournament played on indoor carpet in Shanghai, China that was part of the International Series of the 1998 ATP Tour. It was the third edition of the tournament and was held from 5 October – 12 October.

== Seeds ==
Champion seeds are indicated in bold text while text in italics indicates the round in which those seeds were eliminated.

1. (Croatia) Goran Ivanišević (final)
2. (United States) **Michael Chang (champion)**
3. (United States) Jan-Michael Gambill (second round)
4. (Sweden) Mikael Tillström (first round)
5. (Netherlands) Paul Haarhuis (semifinals)
6. (Paraguay) Ramón Delgado (semifinals)
7. (Denmark) Kenneth Carlsen (quarterfinals)
8. (Australia) Todd Woodbridge (quarterfinals)

== Draw ==
=== Key ===
- Q = Qualifier
- WC = Wild card
- LL = Lucky loser
- Alt = Alternate
- SE = Special exempt
- PR = Protected ranking
- ITF = ITF entry
- JE = Junior exempt
- w/o = Walkover
- r = Retired
- d = Defaulted
- SR = Special ranking

=== Finals ===
Semifinals
1	**(Croatia) Goran Ivanišević**	5	**6**	**7**
6	(Paraguay) Ramón Delgado	**7**	3	5
5	(Netherlands) Paul Haarhuis	5	3
2	**(United States) Michael Chang**	**7**	**6**

Final
1	(Croatia) Goran Ivanišević	**6**	1	2
2	**(United States) Michael Chang**	4	**6**	**6**

=== Top half ===
First round
1	**(Croatia) G Ivanišević**	**6**	**7**
(New Zealand) B Steven	4	6^{8}
**(United States) J Gimelstob**	**6**	**6**
(Netherlands) D van Scheppingen	3	2
**(United States) S Campbell**	**6**	**6**
(United States) TJ Middleton	4	3
7	**(Denmark) K Carlsen**	**7**	**6**
(Germany) M Sinner	5	4
3	**(United States) J-M Gambill**	**6**	**6**
(China) Y Zhang	4	3
**(Australia) M Tebbutt**	**6**	6^{2}	**6**
(Netherlands) S Schalken	4	**7**	4
**(India) L Paes**	**6**	**7**
(Netherlands) J van Lottum	3	6^{6}
6	**(Paraguay) R Delgado**	**6**	3	**6**
(Canada) D Nestor	4	**6**	2

Second round
1	**(Croatia) G Ivanišević**	**6**	**6**
(United States) J Gimelstob	1	4
(United States) S Campbell	3	**6**	3
7	**(Denmark) K Carlsen**	**6**	3	**6**
3	(United States) J-M Gambill	0	R
**(Australia) M Tebbutt**	5
(India) L Paes	**6**	3	5
6	**(Paraguay) R Delgado**	2	**6**	**7**

Quarterfinals
1	**(Croatia) G Ivanišević**	**6**	**7**
7	(Denmark) K Carlsen	3	6^{2}
(Australia) M Tebbutt	4	**7**	3
6	**(Paraguay) R Delgado**	**6**	6^{6}	**6**

Semifinals
1	**(Croatia) G Ivanišević**	5	**6**	**7**
6	(Paraguay) R Delgado	**7**	3	5

=== Bottom half ===
First round
5	**(Netherlands) P Haarhuis**	**6**	**6**
(Spain) Ó Burrieza	3	4
**(Germany) K Braasch**	**7**	**6**
(Germany) M Kohlmann	6^{6}	4
**(Australia) M Woodforde**	**7**	**6**
(Zimbabwe) W Black	6^{1}	4
**(Armenia) S Sargsian**	**6**	**6**
4	(Sweden) M Tillström	3	3
8	**(Australia) T Woodbridge**	1	**6**	**7**
(United States) J Courier	**6**	3	6^{6}
**(France) L Roux**	**6**	**6**
(China) Y Zheng	2	1
**(Italy) L Tieleman**	**6**	**7**
(Romania) A Pavel	3	6^{5}
2	**(United States) M Chang**	**6**	**7**
(Canada) S Lareau	3	6^{4}

Second round
5	**(Netherlands) P Haarhuis**	**6**	**6**
(Germany) K Braasch	0	3
**(Australia) M Woodforde**	**6**	**6**
(Armenia) S Sargsian	2	2
8	**(Australia) T Woodbridge**	**6**	3	**6**
(France) L Roux	2	**6**	2
(Italy) L Tieleman	3	3
2	**(United States) M Chang**	**6**	**6**

Quarterfinals
5	**(Netherlands) P Haarhuis**	**7**	**7**
(Australia) M Woodforde	6^{7}	6^{4}
8	(Australia) T Woodbridge	2	2
2	**(United States) M Chang**	**6**	**6**

Semifinals
5	(Netherlands) P Haarhuis	5	3
2	**(United States) M Chang**	**7**	**6**
