= 2005 Ho Chi Minh City Open – Singles =

Singles
- 2005 Ho Chi Minh City Open

Final
- Champion: (Sweden) Jonas Björkman
- Runner-up: (Czech Republic) Radek Štěpánek
- Score: 6–3, 7–6^{(7–4)}

Details
- Draw: 32
- Seeds: 8

Events
Singles	Doubles
← 2004 ·	Ho Chi Minh City Open	· 2006 →

Jonas Björkman won the title defeating Radek Štěpánek 6–3, 7–6^{(7–4)} in the final.

== Seeds ==
1. (Argentina) Mariano Puerta (semifinals)
2. (Sweden) Thomas Johansson (semifinals)
3. (Czech Republic) Radek Štěpánek (final)
4. (Denmark) Kenneth Carlsen (first round)
5. (France) Cyril Saulnier (quarterfinals)
6. (Argentina) Juan Mónaco (quarterfinals)
7. (Germany) Lars Burgsmüller (second round)
8. (Germany) Philipp Kohlschreiber (first round)

== Draw ==
=== Key ===
- Q = Qualifier
- WC = Wild card
- LL = Lucky loser
- Alt = Alternate
- SE = Special exempt
- PR = Protected ranking
- ITF = ITF entry
- JE = Junior exempt
- w/o = Walkover
- r = Retired
- d = Defaulted
- SR = Special ranking

=== Finals ===
Semifinals
1	(Argentina) Mariano Puerta	1	0
(Sweden) Jonas Björkman	6	6
3	(Czech Republic) Radek Štěpánek	7	6
2	(Sweden) Thomas Johansson	5	4

Final
(Sweden) Jonas Björkman	6	7^{7}
3	(Czech Republic) Radek Štěpánek	3	6^{4}

=== Top half ===
First round
1	(Argentina) M Puerta	6	6^{5}	6
Q	(Japan) G Soeda	4	7^{7}	4
(Argentina) JP Brzezicki	6^{5}	6^{3}
(Australia) W Arthurs	7^{7}	7^{7}
(Germany) S Greul	7^{7}	3	1
(Germany) R Schüttler	6^{4}	6	6
(South Africa) W Moodie	6	7^{7}
8	(Germany) P Kohlschreiber	4	6^{2}
4	(Denmark) K Carlsen	3	4
(Sweden) J Björkman	6	6
WC	(Germany) A Thron	2	3
Q	(United States) C Mamiit	6	6
(Germany) A Waske	7^{7}	6^{4}	7^{9}
(Netherlands) R Sluiter	6^{3}	7^{7}	6^{7}
Q	(Denmark) K Pless	3	7^{10}	2
7	(Germany) L Burgsmüller	6	6^{8}	6

Second round
1	(Argentina) M Puerta	4	7^{7}	7^{7}
(Australia) W Arthurs	6	6^{3}	6^{3}
(Germany) R Schüttler	7^{12}	6
(South Africa) W Moodie	6^{10}	3
(Sweden) J Björkman	6	4
Q	(United States) C Mamiit	4	3^{r}
(Germany) A Waske	7^{7}	7^{7}
7	(Germany) L Burgsmüller	6^{3}	6^{3}

Quarterfinals
1	(Argentina) M Puerta	3	6	7^{7}
(Germany) R Schüttler	6	2	6^{5}
(Sweden) J Björkman	6	6
(Germany) A Waske	2	3

Semifinals
1	(Argentina) M Puerta	1	0
(Sweden) J Björkman	6	6

=== Bottom half ===
First round
6	(Argentina) J Mónaco	6	7
(Croatia) S Tuksar	3	5
(Chinese Taipei) Y-h Lu	6	6
(France) A Dupuis	1	4
(Serbia and Montenegro) J Tipsarević	7^{7}	3	4
Q	(Italy) U Vico	6^{5}	6	6
(South Korea) H-t Lee	6^{3}	1
3	(Czech Republic) R Štěpánek	7^{7}	6
5	(France) C Saulnier	6	6
(Netherlands) P Wessels	2	4
WC	(India) P Amritraj	7^{8}	6^{5}	4
(Czech Republic) J Vaněk	6^{6}	7^{7}	6
(Germany) B Phau	6	6
WC	(Vietnam) MQ Đỗ	3	2
PR	(Germany) A Popp	6	4	3
2	(Sweden) T Johansson	4	6	6

Second round
6	(Argentina) J Mónaco	w/o
(Chinese Taipei) Y-h Lu
Q	(Italy) U Vico	2	1
3	(Czech Republic) R Štěpánek	6	6
5	(France) C Saulnier	7^{7}	7^{12}
(Czech Republic) J Vaněk	6^{3}	6^{10}
(Germany) B Phau	3	2
2	(Sweden) T Johansson	6	6

Quarterfinals
6	(Argentina) J Mónaco	3	4
3	(Czech Republic) R Štěpánek	6	6
5	(France) C Saulnier	6^{2}	2
2	(Sweden) T Johansson	7^{7}	6

Semifinals
3	(Czech Republic) R Štěpánek	7	6
2	(Sweden) T Johansson	5	4
