= 2000 Heineken Open Shanghai – Singles =

Singles
- 2000 Heineken Open Shanghai

Final
- Champion: (Sweden) Magnus Norman
- Runner-up: (Netherlands) Sjeng Schalken
- Score: 6–4, 4–6, 6–3

Details
- Draw: 32
- Seeds: 8

Events
Singles	Doubles
← 1999 ·	Heineken Open Shanghai	· 2001 →

Magnus Norman was the defending champion and successfully defended his title by defeating Sjeng Schalken 6–4, 4–6, 6–3 in the final.

== Seeds ==
1. (Sweden) Magnus Norman (champion)
2. (Ecuador) Nicolás Lapentti (quarterfinals)
3. (United States) Michael Chang (semifinals)
4. (Zimbabwe) Byron Black (quarterfinals, withdrew)
5. (Argentina) Mariano Zabaleta (first round)
6. (Australia) Andrew Ilie (first round)
7. (Netherlands) Sjeng Schalken (semifinals)
8. (Sweden) Jonas Björkman (quarterfinals)

== Draw ==
=== Key ===
- Q = Qualifier
- WC = Wild card
- LL = Lucky loser
- Alt = Alternate
- ITF = ITF entry
- PR = Protected ranking
- SR = Special ranking
- SE = Special exempt
- JE = Junior exempt
- JR = Junior Accelerator Programme entrant
- CO = College Accelerator Programme entrant
- NG = Next Gen Accelerator Program entrant
- w/o = Walkover
- r = Retired
- d = Defaulted

=== Finals ===
Semifinals
1	(Sweden) Magnus Norman	6	6
3	(United States) Michael Chang	3	1
(Spain) Álex Calatrava	4	6	3
7	(Netherlands) Sjeng Schalken	6	3	6

Final
1	(Sweden) Magnus Norman	6	4	6
7	(Netherlands) Sjeng Schalken	4	6	3

=== Top half ===
First round
1	(Sweden) M Norman	6	6^{4}	6
(Italy) A Gaudenzi	3	7^{7}	4
(Thailand) P Srichaphan	2	3
(Brazil) A Sá	6	6
(Australia) W Arthurs	7^{7}	7^{7}
(Belgium) O Rochus	6^{3}	6^{5}
(Italy) D Sanguinetti	6	3	3
8	(Sweden) J Björkman	3	6	6
3	(United States) M Chang	4	6	6
(Israel) H Levy	6	4	1
(United States) P Goldstein	6	7
WC	(China) Y Zhang	4	5
Q	(Russia) M Youzhny	7^{7}	7^{7}
Q	(Germany) C Vinck	6^{5}	6^{0}
(Chile) N Massú	6	7^{7}
5	(Argentina) M Zabaleta	4	6^{5}

Second round
1	(Sweden) M Norman	6	6
(Brazil) A Sá	4	2
(Australia) W Arthurs	4	6^{5}
8	(Sweden) J Björkman	6	7^{7}
3	(United States) M Chang	6	6
(United States) P Goldstein	3	4
Q	(Russia) M Youzhny	6^{14}	1
(Chile) N Massú	7^{16}	6

Quarterfinals
1	(Sweden) M Norman	7^{10}	0	6
8	(Sweden) J Björkman	6^{8}	6	2
3	(United States) M Chang	7	6
(Chile) N Massú	5	3

Semifinals
1	(Sweden) M Norman	6	6
3	(United States) M Chang	3	1

=== Bottom half ===
First round
6	(Australia) A Ilie	1	6^{6}
Q	(Russia) A Stoliarov	6	7^{8}
(Germany) M Hantschk	6	3	6^{5}
(Spain) Á Calatrava	4	6	7^{7}
(Italy) L Tieleman	6	3	6
(Germany) D Elsner	3	6	1
WC	(China) B Zhu	2	1
4	(Zimbabwe) B Black	6	6
7	(Netherlands) S Schalken	6	6
(Belgium) C Rochus	2	4
(Australia) J Stoltenberg	3	6	6
WC	(United States) C Mamiit	6	4	4
(Switzerland) G Bastl	6	6
(United States) J Tarango	4	4
Q	(Bulgaria) O Stanoytchev	6^{2}	3
2	(Ecuador) N Lapentti	7^{7}	6

Second round
Q	(Russia) A Stoliarov	6^{5}	6^{3}
(Spain) Á Calatrava	7^{7}	7^{7}
(Italy) L Tieleman
4	(Zimbabwe) B Black	w/o
7	(Netherlands) S Schalken	1	6	6
(Australia) J Stoltenberg	6	3	4
(Switzerland) G Bastl	3	2
2	(Ecuador) N Lapentti	6	6

Quarterfinals
(Spain) Á Calatrava	w/o
4	(Zimbabwe) B Black
7	(Netherlands) S Schalken	6	6
2	(Ecuador) N Lapentti	3	4

Semifinals
(Spain) Á Calatrava	4	6	3
7	(Netherlands) S Schalken	6	3	6
