= 1997 Shanghai Open – Singles =

Singles
- 1997 Shanghai Open

Final
- Champion: (Slovakia) Ján Krošlák
- Runner-up: (Russia) Alexander Volkov
- Score: 6–2, 7–6^{(7–2)}

Details
- Draw: 32
- Seeds: 8

Events
Singles	Doubles
← 1996 ·	Shanghai Open	· 1998 →

Andrei Olhovskiy was the defending champion but lost in the first round to Thierry Champion.

Ján Krošlák won in the final 6–2, 7–6^{(7–2)} against Alexander Volkov.

== Seeds ==
A champion seed is indicated in bold text while text in italics indicates the round in which that seed was eliminated.

1. (Czech Republic) Ctislav Doseděl (first round)
2. (Russia) Andrei Olhovskiy (first round)
3. (Belgium) Filip Dewulf (second round)
4. (United States) Jeff Tarango (quarterfinals)
5. (United States) Michael Joyce (first round)
6. (Armenia) Sargis Sargsian (first round)
7. (Slovakia) **Ján Krošlák (champion)**
8. (Russia) Alexander Volkov (final)

== Draw ==
=== Key ===
- Q = Qualifier
- WC = Wild card
- LL = Lucky loser
- Alt = Alternate
- SE = Special exempt
- PR = Protected ranking
- ITF = ITF entry
- JE = Junior exempt
- w/o = Walkover
- r = Retired
- d = Defaulted
- SR = Special ranking

First round
1	(Czech Republic) C Doseděl	4	4
(United States) **D Flach**	**6**	**6**
WC	(Netherlands) J Eltingh	6^{3}	**6**	6^{3}
Q	(South Africa) **K Ullyett**	**7^{7}**	3	**7^{7}**
(Israel) **E Ran**	**7^{7}**	**6**
(Italy) S Pescosolido	6^{1}	4
WC	(China) J Xia	5	2
8	(Russia) **A Volkov**	**7**	**6**
3	(Belgium) **F Dewulf**	**6**	**6**
(Japan) S Matsuoka	4	4
(New Zealand) **B Steven**	**7^{7}**	**7^{7}**
(The Bahamas) M Knowles	6^{4}	6^{5}
(United States) **J Gimelstob**	**7^{7}**	1	**6**
Q	(Belarus) M Mirnyi	6^{5}	**6**	2
(France) **G Solvès**	6^{5}	**7^{8}**	**6**
5	(United States) M Joyce	**7^{7}**	6^{6}	3
6	(Armenia) S Sargsian	6^{2}	4
Q	(India) **L Paes**	**7^{7}**	**6**
(Germany) M Sinner	**7**	4	6^{3}
(Sweden) **T Nydahl**	5	**6**	**7^{7}**
(Sweden) **L Jonsson**	**7^{7}**	4	**6**
(Canada) D Nestor	6^{3}	**6**	3
Q	(Japan) S Iwabuchi	3	4
4	(United States) **J Tarango**	**6**	**6**
7	(Slovakia) **J Krošlák**	**6**	**6**
(Italy) F Messori	4	1
(Uzbekistan) **O Ogorodov**	**7^{7}**	1	**7**
(Russia) A Cherkasov	6^{5}	**6**	5
WC	(China) B Pan	5	3
(France) **J Golmard**	**7**	**6**
(France) **T Champion**	**6**	**7^{7}**
2	(Russia) A Olhovskiy	3	6^{3}

Second round
(United States) **D Flach**	**6**	**7**
Q	(South Africa) K Ullyett	3	5
(Israel) E Ran	**7^{7}**	4	1
8	(Russia) **A Volkov**	6^{4}	**6**	**6**
3	(Belgium) F Dewulf	3	**6**	5
(New Zealand) **B Steven**	**6**	4	**7**
(United States) J Gimelstob	5	6^{5}
(France) **G Solvès**	**7**	**7^{7}**
Q	(India) **L Paes**	**6**	**6**
(Sweden) T Nydahl	3	3
(Sweden) L Jonsson	1	2
4	(United States) **J Tarango**	**6**	**6**
7	(Slovakia) **J Krošlák**	3	**6**	**6**
(Uzbekistan) O Ogorodov	**6**	0	3
(France) **J Golmard**	4	**6**	**6**
(France) T Champion	**6**	3	4

Quarterfinals
(United States) D Flach	4	**6**	2
8	(Russia) **A Volkov**	**6**	4	**6**
(New Zealand) **B Steven**	6^{5}	**6**	**6**
(France) G Solvès	**7^{7}**	2	2
Q	(India) **L Paes**	**6**	2	**6**
4	(United States) J Tarango	3	**6**	3
7	(Slovakia) **J Krošlák**	**6**	3	**6**
(France) J Golmard	2	**6**	3

Semifinals
8	(Russia) **A Volkov**	**7^{7}**	**7**
(New Zealand) B Steven	6^{5}	5
Q	(India) L Paes	2	4
7	(Slovakia) **J Krošlák**	**6**	**6**

Final
8	(Russia) Alexander Volkov	2	6^{2}
7	(Slovakia) **Ján Krošlák**	**6**	**7^{7}**
