= 2005 Ho Chi Minh City Open =

- Date: September
- Edition: 1st
- Category: ATP International Series
- Draw: 32S / 16D
- Prize money: $355,000
- Surface: Hard / indoor
- Location: Ho Chi Minh City, Vietnam

Champions

Singles
- (Sweden) Jonas Björkman

Doubles
- (Germany) Lars Burgsmüller / (Germany) Philipp Kohlschreiber
Ho Chi Minh City Open	· 2006 →

The 2005 Ho Chi Minh City Open was an ATP men's tennis tournament in Ho Chi Minh City, Vietnam and played on indoor hard courts. The tournament was part of the ATP International Series of the 2005 ATP Tour and was held from September. It was the first time an ATP tournament was held in Vietnam. Unseeded Jonas Björkman won the singles title.

== Finals ==
=== Singles ===
(Sweden) Jonas Björkman defeated (Czech Republic) Radek Štěpánek 6–3, 7–6^{(7–4)}

=== Doubles ===
(Germany) Lars Burgsmüller / (Germany) Philipp Kohlschreiber defeated (Australia) Ashley Fisher / (Sweden) Robert Lindstedt 5–6^{(3–7)}, 6–4, 6–2
