= Kingfisher Airlines Tennis Open =

Defunct tennis tournament
- Founded: 1996
- Abolished: 2007
- Editions: 11
- Location: Shanghai; China
- Venue: KSLTA Signature Kingfisher Tennis Stadium
- Category: ATP International Series
- Surface: Carpet / Indoors (1996–98); Hard / Outdoors (1999–01, 2003–04, 2006–07); Hard / Indoors (2005)
- Draw: 32S/32Q/16D
- Prize money: $416,000
- Website: kingfisherairlinesopen.com

The Kingfisher Airlines Tennis Open (known as the Kingfisher Airlines Tennis Open for sponsorship reasons) was a professional men's tennis tournament played on outdoor hard courts. It was part of the International Series of the ATP Tour and was held annually in Asia.

== History ==
The tournament was first created in 1996 in Shanghai, China, on indoor carpet courts and as part of the ATP World Series. The second new tournament started by the Association of Tennis Professionals (ATP) in Asia in three years, after the Beijing Open, created in 1993, the Shanghai event ran as a men's only tournament during four years, seeing the likes of Michael Chang, Goran Ivanišević, Marcelo Ríos and Magnus Norman reaching the finals. In 2000, the Tier IV Women's Tennis Association (WTA) tournaments of Beijing was moved to Shanghai, allowing the city to hold both the ATP event, now part of the International Series, and the WTA event.

In 2004, as the ATP was increasing its presence in Asia, having brought the Tennis Masters Cup to Shanghai in 2002, working on moving several events to different new locations, the ATP and WTA Shanghai tournaments were both relocated, with the women's, now a Tier II tournament, returning to Beijing, and the men's moving to Ho Chi Minh City, Vietnam. After the 2005 edition, the tournament moved once more to a new country, in India, taking place in the city of Mumbai first, in 2006 and 2007, and then moving again to Bangalore for the 2008 edition. The first event to be held in the new location, though, was cancelled due to security fears, and the first Bangalore Open consequently postponed to the next season. In 2009 a new tournament in Asia was created to replace it, the Malaysian Open, located on Kuala Lumpur, Malaysia.

== Past finals ==
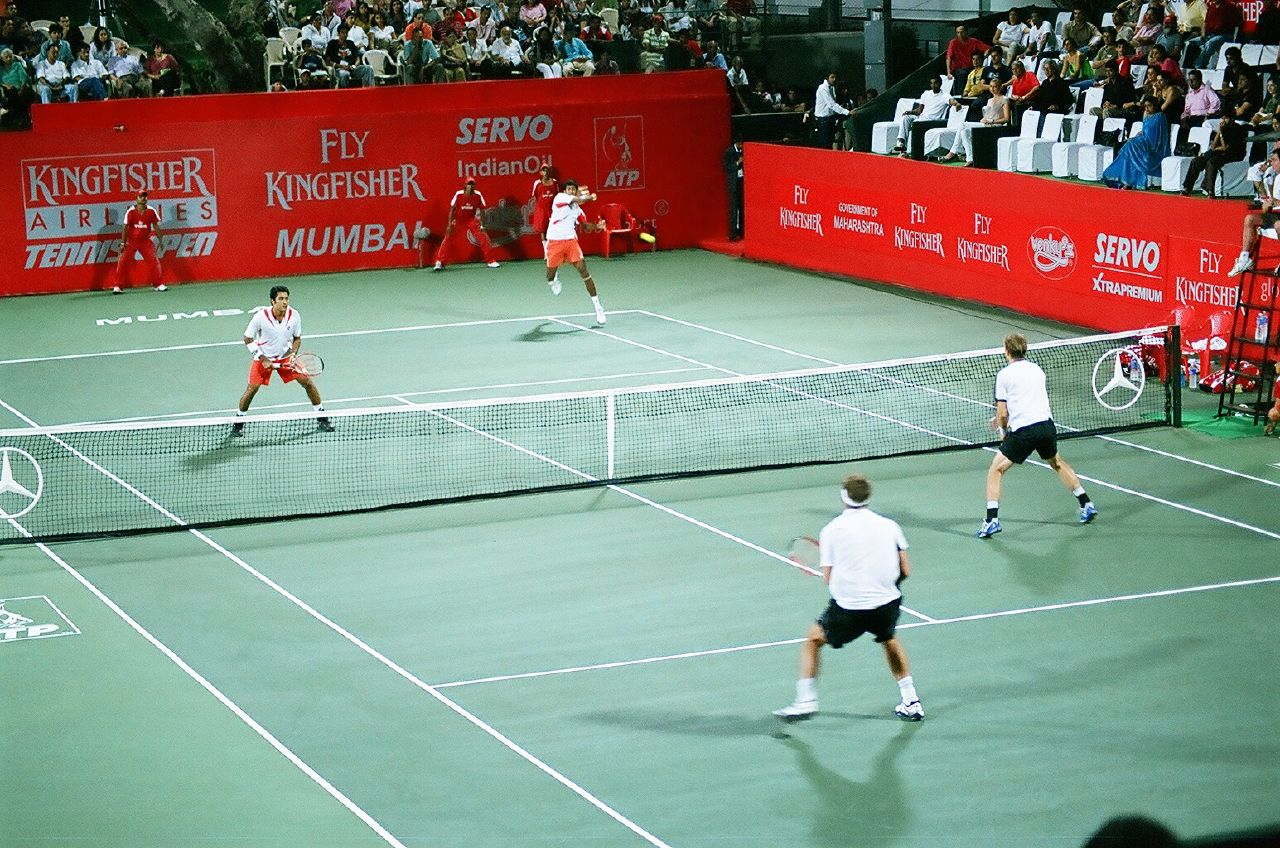
The 2007 Men's doubles finals in action at CCI Tennis courts in Mumbai

=== Singles ===
| Location | Year | Champions | Runners-up | Score |
|---|---|---|---|---|
| Bengaluru | 2008–09 | Not held | | |
| Mumbai | 2007 | (France) Richard Gasquet | (Belgium) Olivier Rochus | 6–3, 6–4 |
| Mumbai | 2006 | (Russia) Dmitry Tursunov | (Czech Republic) Tomáš Berdych | 6–3, 4–6, 7–6^{(7–5)} |
| Ho Chi Minh City | 2005 | (Sweden) Jonas Björkman | (Czech Republic) Radek Štěpánek | 6–3, 7–6^{(7–4)} |
| Shanghai | 2004 | (Argentina) Guillermo Cañas | (Germany) Lars Burgsmüller | 6–1, 6–0 |
| Shanghai | 2003 | (Australia) Mark Philippoussis | (Czech Republic) Jiří Novák | 6–2, 6–1 |
| Shanghai | 2002 | Not held | | |
| Shanghai | 2001 | (Germany) Rainer Schüttler | (Switzerland) Michel Kratochvil | 6–3, 6–4 |
| Shanghai | 2000 | (Sweden) Magnus Norman | (Netherlands) Sjeng Schalken | 6–4, 4–6, 6–3 |
| Shanghai | 1999 | (Sweden) Magnus Norman | (Chile) Marcelo Ríos | 2–6, 6–3, 7–5 |
| Shanghai | 1998 | (United States) Michael Chang | (Croatia) Goran Ivanišević | 4–6, 6–1, 6–2 |
| Shanghai | 1997 | (Slovakia) Ján Krošlák | (Russia) Alexander Volkov | 6–2, 7–6^{(7–2)} |
| Shanghai | 1996 | (Russia) Andrei Olhovskiy | (The Bahamas) Mark Knowles | 7–6^{(7–5)}, 6–2 |

=== Doubles ===
| Location | Year | Champions | Runners-up | Score |
|---|---|---|---|---|
| Bangalore | 2008–09 | Not held | | |
| Mumbai | 2007 | (Sweden) Robert Lindstedt (Finland) Jarkko Nieminen | (India) Rohan Bopanna (Pakistan) Aisam-ul-Haq Qureshi | 7–6^{(7–3)}, 7–6^{(7–5)} |
| Mumbai | 2006 | (Croatia) Mario Ančić (India) Mahesh Bhupathi | (India) Rohan Bopanna (India) Mustafa Ghouse | 6–4, 6–7^{(6–8)}, 10–8 |
| Ho Chi Minh City | 2005 | (Germany) Lars Burgsmüller (Germany) Philipp Kohlschreiber | (Australia) Ashley Fisher (Sweden) Robert Lindstedt | 5–6^{(3–7)}, 6–4, 6–2 (Note: Tie-breaks were held at 5–5 and not 6–6 in this tournament.) |
| Shanghai | 2004 | (United States) Jared Palmer (Czech Republic) Pavel Vízner | (United States) Rick Leach (United States) Brian MacPhie | 4–6, 7–6^{(7–4)}, 7–6^{(13–11)} |
| Shanghai | 2003 | (Australia) Wayne Arthurs (Australia) Paul Hanley | (China) Zeng Shaoxuan (China) Zhu Benqiang | 6–2, 6–4 |
| Shanghai | 2002 | Not held | | |
| Shanghai | 2001 | (Zimbabwe) Byron Black (Japan) Thomas Shimada | (South Africa) John-Laffnie de Jager (South Africa) Robbie Koenig | 6–2, 3–6, 7–5 |
| Shanghai | 2000 | (Netherlands) Paul Haarhuis (Netherlands) Sjeng Schalken | (Czech Republic) Petr Pála (Czech Republic) Pavel Vízner | 6–2, 3–6, 6–4 |
| Shanghai | 1999 | (Canada) Sébastien Lareau (Canada) Daniel Nestor | (Australia) Todd Woodbridge (Australia) Mark Woodforde | 7–5, 6–3 |
| Shanghai | 1998 | (India) Mahesh Bhupathi (India) Leander Paes | (Australia) Todd Woodbridge (Australia) Mark Woodforde | 6–4, 6–7, 7–6 |
| Shanghai | 1997 | (Belarus) Max Mirnyi (Zimbabwe) Kevin Ullyett | (Sweden) Tomas Nydahl (Italy) Stefano Pescosolido | 7–6, 6–7, 7–5 |
| Shanghai | 1996 | (The Bahamas) Mark Knowles (The Bahamas) Roger Smith | (United States) Jim Grabb (Australia) Michael Tebbutt | 4–6, 6–2, 7–6 |
