= 1996 Shanghai Open – Singles =

Singles
- 1996 Shanghai Open

Final
- Champion: (Russia) Andrei Olhovskiy
- Runner-up: (The Bahamas) Mark Knowles
- Score: 7–6^{(7–5)}, 6–2

Details
- Draw: 32
- Seeds: 8

Events
Singles	Doubles
Shanghai Open	· 1997 →

Andrei Olhovskiy won in the final 7–6 (7–5), 6–2 against Mark Knowles.

== Seeds ==
A champion seed is indicated in bold text while text in italics indicates the round in which that seed was eliminated.

1. (United States) Jeff Tarango (quarterfinals)
2. (United Kingdom) Tim Henman (semifinals)
3. (Uzbekistan) Oleg Ogorodov (second round)
4. (Australia) Michael Tebbutt (semifinals)
5. (South Africa) Marcos Ondruska (quarterfinals)
6. (Russia) **Andrei Olhovskiy (champion)**
7. (United States) Steve Campbell (first round)
8. (United States) Tommy Ho (second round)

== Draw ==
=== Key ===
- Q = Qualifier
- WC = Wild card
- LL = Lucky loser
- Alt = Alternate
- SE = Special exempt
- PR = Protected ranking
- ITF = ITF entry
- JE = Junior exempt
- w/o = Walkover
- r = Retired
- d = Defaulted
- SR = Special ranking

First round
1	(United States) **J Tarango**	**6**	**7^{7}**
(United Kingdom) J Bates	4	6^{3}
(Sweden) T Nydahl	1	6^{4}
Q	(United Kingdom) **D Sapsford**	**6**	**7^{7}**
Q	(Zimbabwe) W Black	2	2
(The Bahamas) **M Knowles**	**6**	**6**
(Germany) D Dier	6^{4}	1
8	(United States) **T Ho**	**7^{7}**	**6**
4	(Australia) **M Tebbutt**	**6**	**6**
(South Africa) D Nainkin	4	2
(Haiti) R Agénor	6^{4}	6^{8}
(Russia) **A Cherkasov**	**7^{7}**	**7^{10}**
Q	(United Kingdom) A Richardson	**6**	3	4
(Sweden) **L Jonsson**	1	**6**	**6**
(Israel) E Ran	3	3
5	(South Africa) **M Ondruska**	**6**	**6**
6	(Russia) **A Olhovskiy**	4	**6**	**6**
Q	(Israel) N Behr	**6**	3	4
(India) L Paes	4	6^{5}
(Morocco) **H Arazi**	**6**	**7^{7}**
WC	(China) J Xia	4	2
(Italy) **C Caratti**	**6**	**6**
(Romania) D Pescariu	**7^{7}**	2	2
3	(Uzbekistan) **O Ogorodov**	6^{4}	**6**	**6**
7	(United States) S Campbell	4	4
(United Kingdom) **M Petchey**	**6**	**6**
(Germany) **P Baur**	**6**	**6**
(United States) B Shelton	3	4
WC	(China) B Pan	2	3
WC	(United States) **J Grabb**	**6**	**6**
(France) J-P Fleurian	**7^{7}**	2	5
2	(United Kingdom) **T Henman**	6^{4}	**6**	**7**

Second round
1	(United States) **J Tarango**	5	**6**	**6**
Q	(United Kingdom) D Sapsford	**7**	0	3
(The Bahamas) **M Knowles**	**7^{7}**	6^{5}	**6**
8	(United States) T Ho	6^{5}	**7^{7}**	4
4	(Australia) **M Tebbutt**	**7**	**6**
(Russia) A Cherkasov	5	1
(Sweden) L Jonsson	3	1
5	(South Africa) **M Ondruska**	**6**	**6**
6	(Russia) **A Olhovskiy**	4	**7^{7}**	**7**
(Morocco) H Arazi	**6**	6^{4}	5
(Italy) **C Caratti**	**6**	**6**
3	(Uzbekistan) O Ogorodov	2	3
(United Kingdom) **M Petchey**	**6**	**6**
(Germany) P Baur	4	4
WC	(United States) J Grabb	4	6^{2}
2	(United Kingdom) **T Henman**	**6**	**7^{7}**

Quarterfinals
1	(United States) J Tarango	**7**	5	2
(The Bahamas) **M Knowles**	5	**7**	**6**
4	(Australia) **M Tebbutt**	**6**	**7^{8}**
5	(South Africa) M Ondruska	4	6^{6}
6	(Russia) **A Olhovskiy**	**6**	**6**
(Italy) C Caratti	3	4
(United Kingdom) M Petchey	1	6^{4}
2	(United Kingdom) **T Henman**	**6**	**7^{7}**

Semifinals
(The Bahamas) **M Knowles**	3	**6**	**6**
4	(Australia) M Tebbutt	**6**	1	4
6	(Russia) **A Olhovskiy**	4	**6**	**6**
2	(United Kingdom) T Henman	**6**	4	4

Final
(The Bahamas) Mark Knowles	6^{5}	2
6	(Russia) **Andrei Olhovskiy**	**7^{7}**	**6**
