= 1998 Shanghai Open – Doubles =

Doubles
- 1998 Shanghai Open

Final
- Champions: (India) Mahesh Bhupathi (India) Leander Paes
- Runners-up: (Australia) Todd Woodbridge (Australia) Mark Woodforde
- Score: 6–4, 6–7, 7–6

Events
Singles	Doubles
← 1997 ·	Shanghai Open	· 1999 →

The 1998 Shanghai Open was a men's tennis tournament played on indoor carpet in Shanghai, China that was part of the International Series of the 1998 ATP Tour. It was the third edition of the tournament and was held from 5 October – 12 October.

== Seeds ==
Champion seeds are indicated in bold text while text in italics indicates the round in which those seeds were eliminated.

1. (Australia) Todd Woodbridge / (Australia) Mark Woodforde (final)
2. (India) **Mahesh Bhupathi** / (India) **Leander Paes (champions)**
3. (United States) Patrick Galbraith / (New Zealand) Brett Steven (semifinals)
4. (Zimbabwe) Wayne Black / (Australia) Peter Tramacchi (semifinals)

== Draw ==
=== Key ===
- Q = Qualifier
- WC = Wild card
- LL = Lucky loser
- Alt = Alternate
- SE = Special exempt
- PR = Protected ranking
- ITF = ITF entry
- JE = Junior exempt
- w/o = Walkover
- r = Retired
- d = Defaulted
- SR = Special ranking

=== Finals ===
First round
1	(Australia) **T Woodbridge** **(Australia) M Woodforde**	**7**	**6**
(Denmark) K Carlsen (Italy) L Tieleman	6	3
(United States) **M Keil** **(United States) TJ Middleton**	**7**	**6**
(Germany) K Braasch (Germany) M Kohlmann	6	4
4	(Zimbabwe) **W Black** **(Australia) P Tramacchi**	**6**	**6**
(China) S Li (China) Y Zheng	2	1
(Croatia) **S Hiršzon** **(Croatia) G Ivanišević**	**6**	**6**
(United States) M Chang (United States) C Chang	0	4
(Australia) **M Tebbutt** **(Sweden) M Tillström**	**6**	**6**
(Russia) K Ivanov-Smolensky (France) L Roux	4	4
3	(United States) **P Galbraith** **(New Zealand) B Steven**	**6**	5	**6**
(United States) J Courier (United States) J Gimelstob	3	**7**	3
(Netherlands) **S Schalken** **(Netherlands) J van Lottum**	**6**	5	**6**
(United States) J-M Gambill (Netherlands) P Haarhuis	4	**7**	3
2	(India) **M Bhupathi** **(India) L Paes**	**7**	**6**
(Australia) B Ellwood (Armenia) S Sargsian	5	4

Quarterfinals
1	(Australia) **T Woodbridge** **(Australia) M Woodforde**	**6**	**6**
(United States) M Keil (United States) TJ Middleton	2	1
4	(Zimbabwe) **W Black** **(Australia) P Tramacchi**	6	**6**	**7**
(Croatia) S Hiršzon (Croatia) G Ivanišević	**7**	4	6
(Australia) M Tebbutt (Sweden) M Tillström	4	**7**	4
3	(United States) **P Galbraith** **(New Zealand) B Steven**	**6**	5	**6**
(Netherlands) S Schalken (Netherlands) J van Lottum	4	3
2	(India) **M Bhupathi** **(India) L Paes**	**6**	**6**

Semifinals
1	(Australia) **T Woodbridge** **(Australia) M Woodforde**	**7**	**6**
4	(Zimbabwe) W Black (Australia) P Tramacchi	6	2
3	(United States) P Galbraith (New Zealand) B Steven
2	(India) **M Bhupathi** **(India) L Paes**	w/o

Final
1	(Australia) T Woodbridge (Australia) M Woodforde	4	**7**	6
2	(India) **M Bhupathi** **(India) L Paes**	**6**	6	**7**
