= 1998 Shanghai Open =

- Date: 5–12 October
- Edition: 3rd
- Category: World Series
- Draw: 32S / 16D
- Prize money: $315,000
- Surface: Hard / outdoor
- Location: Shanghai, China

Champions

Singles
- (United States) Michael Chang

Doubles
- (India) Mahesh Bhupathi / (India) Leander Paes
← 1997 ·	Shanghai Open	· 1999 →

The 1998 Shanghai Open was a men's tennis tournament played on outdoor hard courts in Shanghai, China that was part of the World Series of the 1998 ATP Tour. It was the third edition of the tournament and was held from 5 October until 12 October 1998. Second-seeded Michael Chang won the singles title.

== Finals ==
=== Singles ===
(United States) Michael Chang defeated (Croatia) Goran Ivanišević, 4–6, 6–1, 6–2

- It was Chang's 2nd singles title of the year and the 33rd of his career.

=== Doubles ===
(India) Mahesh Bhupathi / (India) Leander Paes defeated (Australia) Todd Woodbridge / (Australia) Mark Woodforde, 6–4, 6–7, 7–6
