= 1996 Shanghai Open – Doubles =

Doubles
- 1996 Shanghai Open

Final
- Champions: (The Bahamas) Mark Knowles (The Bahamas) Roger Smith
- Runners-up: (United States) Jim Grabb (Australia) Michael Tebbutt
- Score: 4–6, 6–2, 7–6

Events
Singles	Doubles
Shanghai Open	· 1997 →

Mark Knowles and Roger Smith won in the final 4–6, 6–2, 7–6 against Jim Grabb and Michael Tebbutt.

== Seeds ==
Champion seeds are indicated in bold text while text in italics indicates the round in which those seeds were eliminated.

1. (United States) Mark Keil / (United States) Jeff Tarango (quarterfinals)
2. (United States) Jim Grabb / (Australia) Michael Tebbutt (final)
3. (South Africa) Piet Norval / (South Africa) Marcos Ondruska (first round)
4. (United States) Kent Kinnear / (United States) Dave Randall (semifinals)

== Draw ==
=== Key ===
- Q = Qualifier
- WC = Wild card
- LL = Lucky loser
- Alt = Alternate
- SE = Special exempt
- PR = Protected ranking
- ITF = ITF entry
- JE = Junior exempt
- w/o = Walkover
- r = Retired
- d = Defaulted
- SR = Special ranking

First round
1	(United States) **M Keil** (United States) **J Tarango**	**7**	**7**
(South Africa) D Adams (United States) B MacPhie	6	6
(Australia) J Eagle (Australia) A Kratzmann	**7**	5	6
(The Bahamas) **M Knowles** (The Bahamas) **R Smith**	5	**7**	**7**
4	(United States) **K Kinnear** (United States) **D Randall**	**6**	**6**
Q	(United Kingdom) M Petchey (United Kingdom) D Sapsford	4	4
(United Kingdom) **T Henman** (United Kingdom) **A Richardson**	**7**	**6**
WC	(China) J Zhang (China) Y Zheng	6	2
WC	(China) **B Pan** (China) **J Xia**	**6**	6	**6**
WC	(China) J Guo (China) X Xu	4	**7**	2
(France) **J-P Fleurian** (Australia) **P Kilderry**	**7**	6	**6**
3	(South Africa) P Norval (South Africa) M Ondruska	6	**7**	4
(United States) D Johnson (United States) F Montana	2	4
(United States) **T Ho** (United States) **B Shelton**	**6**	**6**
(Zimbabwe) W Black (India) L Paes	3	**7**	3
2	(United States) **J Grabb** (Australia) **M Tebbutt**	**6**	6	**6**

Quarterfinals
1	(United States) M Keil (United States) J Tarango	3	3
(The Bahamas) **M Knowles** (The Bahamas) **R Smith**	**6**	**6**
4	(United States) **K Kinnear** (United States) **D Randall**	**7**	**6**
(United Kingdom) T Henman (United Kingdom) A Richardson	6	3
WC	(China) B Pan (China) J Xia	4	1
(France) **J-P Fleurian** (Australia) **P Kilderry**	**6**	**6**
(United States) T Ho (United States) B Shelton	**6**	3	5
2	(United States) **J Grabb** (Australia) **M Tebbutt**	2	**6**	**7**

Semifinals
(The Bahamas) **M Knowles** (The Bahamas) **R Smith**	**7**	**7**
4	(United States) K Kinnear (United States) D Randall	6	6
(France) J-P Fleurian (Australia) P Kilderry	3	6
2	(United States) **J Grabb** (Australia) **M Tebbutt**	**6**	**7**

Final
(The Bahamas) **Mark Knowles** (The Bahamas) **Roger Smith**	4	**6**	**7**
2	(United States) Jim Grabb (Australia) Michael Tebbutt	**6**	2	6
