= 1997 Shanghai Open =

- Date: January 27 – February 2
- Edition: 2nd
- Category: World Series
- Draw: 32S / 16D
- Prize money: $305,000
- Surface: Carpet / indoor
- Location: Shanghai, China

Champions

Singles
- (Slovakia) Ján Krošlák

Doubles
- (Belarus) Max Mirnyi / (South Africa) Kevin Ullyett
← 1996 ·	Shanghai Open	· 1998 →

The 1997 Shanghai Open was a men's tennis tournament played on indoor carpet courts in Shanghai, China that was part of the World Series of the 1997 ATP Tour. It was the second edition of the tournament and was held from January 27 through February 2, 1997. Seventh-seeded Ján Krošlák won the singles title.

== Finals ==
=== Singles ===
(Slovakia) Ján Krošlák defeated (Russia) Alexander Volkov 6–2, 7–6^{(7–2)}

- It was Krošlák's only title of the year and the 2nd of his career.

=== Doubles ===
(Belarus) Max Mirnyi / (South Africa) Kevin Ullyett defeated (Sweden) Tomas Nydahl / (Italy) Stefano Pescosolido 7–6, 6–7, 7–5

- It was Mirnyi's only title of the year and the 1st of his career. It was Ullyett's only title of the year and the 1st of his career.
