= 1997 Shanghai Open – Doubles =

Doubles
- 1997 Shanghai Open
- 1996 Champions: (The Bahamas) Mark Knowles (The Bahamas) Roger Smith

Final
- Champions: (Belarus) Max Mirnyi (South Africa) Kevin Ullyett
- Runners-up: (Sweden) Tomas Nydahl (Italy) Stefano Pescosolido
- Score: 7–6, 6–7, 7–5

Events
Singles	Doubles
← 1996 ·	Shanghai Open	· 1998 →

Mark Knowles and Roger Smith were the defending champions but lost in the quarterfinals to Ctislav Doseděl and Ján Krošlák.

Max Mirnyi and Kevin Ullyett won in the final 7–6, 6–7, 7–5 against Tomas Nydahl and Stefano Pescosolido.

== Seeds ==
Champion seeds are indicated in bold text while text in italics indicates the round in which those seeds were eliminated.

1. (The Bahamas) Mark Knowles / (The Bahamas) Roger Smith (quarterfinals)
2. (Sweden) David Ekerot / (United States) Jeff Tarango (quarterfinals)
3. (India) Mahesh Bhupathi / (India) Leander Paes (quarterfinals)
4. (United States) Bill Behrens / (United States) Brian MacPhie (quarterfinals)

== Draw ==
=== Key ===
- Q = Qualifier
- WC = Wild card
- LL = Lucky loser
- Alt = Alternate
- SE = Special exempt
- PR = Protected ranking
- ITF = ITF entry
- JE = Junior exempt
- w/o = Walkover
- r = Retired
- d = Defaulted
- SR = Special ranking

First round
1	(The Bahamas) **M Knowles** (The Bahamas) **R Smith**	**6**	**6**
Q	(Japan) S Iwabuchi (Japan) T Suzuki	3	4
(Czech Republic) **C Doseděl** (Slovakia) **J Krošlák**	**6**	**6**
(Italy) F Messori (Israel) E Ran	1	2
3	(India) **M Bhupathi** (India) **L Paes**	**6**	**6**
WC	(China) B Pan (China) J Xia	2	2
(Sweden) **T Nydahl** (Italy) **S Pescosolido**	**7**	1	**7**
(France) J Golmard (Japan) S Matsuoka	5	**6**	5
(United States) D Flach (United States) T.J. Middleton	**6**	5	2
(Russia) **A Olhovskiy** (New Zealand) **B Steven**	4	**7**	**6**
(Zimbabwe) W Black (Venezuela) N Pereira	2	2
4	(United States) **B Behrens** (United States) **B MacPhie**	**6**	**6**
(Belarus) **M Mirnyi** (South Africa) **K Ullyett**	**7**	**6**
(United States) K Kinnear (Armenia) S Sargsian	5	3
(United States) J Gimelstob (United States) M Joyce	1	2
2	(Sweden) **D Ekerot** (United States) **J Tarango**	**6**	**6**

Quarterfinals
1	(The Bahamas) M Knowles (The Bahamas) R Smith	**7**	4	3
(Czech Republic) **C Doseděl** (Slovakia) **J Krošlák**	6	**6**	**6**
3	(India) M Bhupathi (India) L Paes	**6**	4	3
(Sweden) **T Nydahl** (Italy) **S Pescosolido**	1	**6**	**6**
(Russia) **A Olhovskiy** (New Zealand) **B Steven**	**6**	**6**
4	(United States) B Behrens (United States) B MacPhie	4	3
(Belarus) **M Mirnyi** (South Africa) **K Ullyett**	**6**	**6**
2	(Sweden) D Ekerot (United States) J Tarango	4	4

Semifinals
(Czech Republic) C Doseděl (Slovakia) J Krošlák	4	5
(Sweden) **T Nydahl** (Italy) **S Pescosolido**	**6**	**7**
(Russia) A Olhovskiy (New Zealand) B Steven	6	**6**	6
(Belarus) **M Mirnyi** (South Africa) **K Ullyett**	**7**	3	**7**

Final
(Sweden) Tomas Nydahl (Italy) Stefano Pescosolido	6	**7**	5
(Belarus) **Max Mirnyi** (South Africa) **Kevin Ullyett**	**7**	6	**7**
