= 1996 Shanghai Open =

- Date: January 29 – February 4
- Edition: 1st
- Category: World Series
- Draw: 32S / 16D
- Prize money: $303,000
- Surface: Carpet / indoor
- Location: Shanghai, China

Champions

Singles
- (Russia) Andrei Olhovskiy

Doubles
- (The Bahamas) Mark Knowles / (The Bahamas) Roger Smith
Shanghai Open	· 1997 →

The 1996 Shanghai Open was a men's tennis tournament played on indoor carpet courts in Shanghai, China that was part of the World Series of the 1996 ATP Tour. It was the inaugural edition of the tournament and was held from January 29 through February 4, 1996. Sixth-seeded Andrei Olhovskiy won the singles title.

== Finals ==
=== Singles ===
(Russia) Andrei Olhovskiy defeated (The Bahamas) Mark Knowles 7–6^{(7–5)}, 6–2

- It was Olhovskiy's 1st title of the year and the 13th of his career.

=== Doubles ===
(The Bahamas) Mark Knowles / (The Bahamas) Roger Smith defeated (United States) Jim Grabb / (Australia) Michael Tebbutt 4–6, 6–2, 7–6

- It was Knowles' 2nd title of the year and the 6th of his career. It was Smith's only title of the year and the 3rd of his career.
