= Pavel Vízner =

Czech tennis player (born 1970)

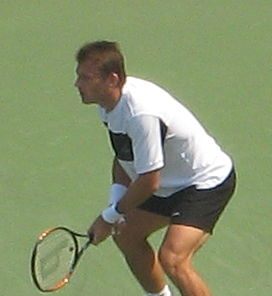
- Country (sports): Czech Republic
- Residence: Prague, Czech Republic
- Born: 15 July 1970 (age 56) Prague, Czechoslovakia (now Czech Republic)
- Height: 1.80 m (5 ft 11 in)
- Turned pro: 1990
- Retired: 2009
- Plays: Right-handed (two-handed backhand)
- Prize money: $2,337,009

Singles
- Career record: 0–4
- Career titles: 0
- Highest ranking: No. 435 (23 August 1993)

Doubles
- Career record: 394–359
- Career titles: 16
- Highest ranking: No. 5 (5 November 2007)

Grand Slam doubles results
- Australian Open: QF (2008)
- French Open: F (2001, 2007)
- Wimbledon: SF (1997)
- US Open: F (2007)

Pavel Vízner (born 15 July 1970) is a retired professional male tennis player from the Czech Republic. Vízner reached the French Open doubles final twice, having had turned professional in 1990. He achieved a career high doubles ranking of world No. 5 in November 2007 and won 16 doubles titles during his career.

== Career ==
While Vízner had played tournaments in 1988 and 1989 before professionalism in 1990, he won his first title in Prague in 1993 on the Challenger circuit, defeating Swedes Tomas Nydahl and Mikael Tillström in the final, partnered by David Rikl, also a player with a higher doubles ranking and ultimately more success. He won another minor title in Guayaquil, Ecuador later in 1995.

Pavel broke through in 1996, winning a total of five titles; three of them being major titles. His first major title that he won was at Sankt Pölten, with Sláva Doseděl where they defeated David Adams and Menno Oosting in the final. His next title he won with Paul Kilderry over Anders Järryd and number 7 doubles player Mark Knowles in a tournament in Rosmalen, Netherlands. En route, he and partner Kilderry beat the 4th, 7th, 12th, and 14th-ranked doubles players. He won another title yet again in Gstaad, Switzerland, beating David Macpherson and Trevor Kronemann in the final, aside Jiří Novák (a doubles talent in a later day) In Grand Slam men's doubles performance, he participated in the French Open and the U.S. Open, and made the third round at Wimbledon. He ended 1996 ranked 28, having had broken into the top 100 for doubles.

1997 was title dry for Vízner; however he did make the semifinals of the Wimbledon men's doubles tournament with Martin Damm, who yet again thrived as a doubles player. He participated in the Australian Open for the first time, but remained title dry for several years until 2003, and did not reach a final until 1998.

While the years of 1998, 1999 and 2000 were somewhat dull for Vízner title-wise, he did win minor titles in each of these years. He made the finals of tournaments in these three years as well, and lost a close match at the 1999 Wimbledon Championships to 6th-ranked Olivier Delaître and 12th-ranked Fabrice Santoro in the second round of doubles competition along with Peter Tramacchi, in five sets.

His equalled-best Grand Slam performance to date came in 2001 where he and Petr Pála lost in the final of the 2001 French Open to Indians Mahesh Bhupathi and Leander Paes. Vízner and Pála also made the quarterfinals of the 2001 Wimbledon Championships, but lost to Belarus's Max Mirnyi, ranked 5th, and Belarusian compatriot Vladimir Voltchkov, ranked 406th, despite being up 2–1 in set score. In 2001, he also reached number 13, his highest rank to date.

He dropped out of the top 20 for doubles in 2002, having not won a title and losing early in many events.

2003, however, broke his title drought. He won an International Series Gold tournament in Stuttgart and one other title with compatriot Tomáš Cibulec. He finished the year ranked 27.

In 2004, Pavel won three titles, making them his 6th, 7th and 8th titles of his career. He then went on to lose in the third round of Wimbledon and the quarterfinals of the U.S. Open in 2005 alongside Cyril Suk. He won Costa do Sauípe and Estoril with youngster partner Lukáš Dlouhý in 2006, and the team lost in the semifinals of the French Open.

2007 was a successful year for Vizner, as for the veteran aged 37 teamed with the young Dlouhý. The team defended their Costa do Sauípe title and continued their success to make the finals of Acapulco right after, but lost to Potito Starace and Martín Vassallo Argüello in two sets.

He went on to equal his best Grand Slam performance by making the finals of the 2007 French Open men's doubles tournament with Lukáš Dlouhý, notching a win over co-ranked number ones and twin brothers Bob and Mike Bryan, and then beat 2006 Wimbledon runners-up Fabrice Santoro and Nenad Zimonjić. They were to play Mark Knowles and Daniel Nestor in the final. Vízner and Dlouhý easily took the first set 6–2, but then lost the next two and therefore lost to Knowles and Nestor.

Vízner went on to win an ATP Masters Series tournament with Mahesh Bhupathi at the Canada Masters in Montréal. En route, the team took out Leander Paes and Martin Damm, the defending U.S. Open champions of 2006 for men's doubles, and Bob and Mike Bryan in the semifinals. They beat Paul Hanley and Kevin Ullyett in the final.

Vízner returned to partnering with Dlouhý, and made a comeback as a team; as for they beat the Knowles / Nestor team avenging them for their French Open victory at the 2007 Cincinnati Masters. However, their success was halted by the eventual-winning Israeli duo of Jonathan Erlich and Andy Ram. As of 21 August 2007 Vízner is ranked 14, one away from his all-time career-high doubles ranking after 19 years of playing professional tournaments.

Pavel came to make the finals of the 2007 U.S. Open with Dlouhý, but lost in the final to Julian Knowle and Simon Aspelin in two sets. He achieved a career-high ranking of number 6 the week after the U.S. Open. In achieving this, the team again defeated Knowles/Nestor and then Hanley/Ullyett, before losing in the final.

== Grand Slam finals ==
=== Doubles: 3 runner-ups ===
| Result | Year | Championship | Surface | Partner | Opponents | Score |
|---|---|---|---|---|---|---|
| Loss | 2001 | French Open | Clay | (Czech Republic) Petr Pála | (India) Mahesh Bhupathi (India) Leander Paes | 6–7, 3–6 |
| Loss | 2007 | French Open | Clay | (Czech Republic) Lukáš Dlouhý | (The Bahamas) Mark Knowles (Canada) Daniel Nestor | 6–2, 3–6, 4–6 |
| Loss | 2007 | US Open | Hard | (Czech Republic) Lukáš Dlouhý | (Sweden) Simon Aspelin (Austria) Julian Knowle | 5–7, 4–6 |

== Career finals ==
Legend
Grand Slam (0)
Tennis Masters Cup (0)
ATP Masters Series (1)
ATP International Series Gold (3)
ATP Tour (12)

=== Doubles (16 titles, 20 runner-ups) ===
| Result | W/L | Date | Tournament | Surface | Partner | Opponents | Score |
|---|---|---|---|---|---|---|---|
| Loss | 0–1 | Aug 1994 | Prague, Czech Republic | Clay | (Czech Republic) Tomáš Krupa | (Czech Republic) Karel Nováček (Sweden) Mats Wilander | W/O |
| Win | 1–1 | May 1996 | Sankt Pölten, Austria | Clay | (Czech Republic) Sláva Doseděl | (South Africa) David Adams (Netherlands) Menno Oosting | 6–7, 6–4, 6–3 |
| Win | 2–1 | Jun 1996 | Rosmalen, Netherlands | Grass | (Australia) Paul Kilderry | (Sweden) Anders Järryd (The Bahamas) Mark Knowles | 7–5, 6–3 |
| Win | 3–1 | Jul 1996 | Gstaad, Switzerland | Clay | (Czech Republic) Jiří Novák | (United States) Trevor Kronemann (Australia) David Macpherson | 4–6, 7–6, 7–6 |
| Loss | 3–2 | Oct 1996 | Vienna, Austria | Carpet (i) | (Netherlands) Menno Oosting | (Russia) Yevgeny Kafelnikov (Czech Republic) Daniel Vacek | 6–7, 4–6 |
| Loss | 3–3 | Oct 1998 | Ostrava, Czech Republic | Carpet (i) | (South Africa) David Adams | (Germany) Nicolas Kiefer (Germany) David Prinosil | 4–6, 3–6 |
| Loss | 3–4 | Feb 1999 | Marseille, France | Hard (i) | (South Africa) David Adams | (Belarus) Max Mirnyi (Russia) Andrei Olhovskiy | 5–7, 6–7^{(7–9)} |
| Loss | 3–5 | Aug 1999 | San Marino, San Marino | Clay | (Czech Republic) Petr Pála | (Argentina) Lucas Arnold Ker (Argentina) Mariano Hood | 3–6, 2–6 |
| Loss | 3–6 | Oct 2000 | Shanghai, China | Hard | (Czech Republic) Petr Pála | (Netherlands) Paul Haarhuis (Netherlands) Sjeng Schalken | 2–6, 6–3, 4–6 |
| Loss | 3–7 | Nov 2000 | Stockholm, Sweden | Hard | (Czech Republic) Petr Pála | (The Bahamas) Mark Knowles (Canada) Daniel Nestor | 3–6, 2–6 |
| Loss | 3–8 | Feb 2001 | Rotterdam, Netherlands | Hard | (Czech Republic) Petr Pála | (Sweden) Jonas Björkman (Switzerland) Roger Federer | 3–6, 0–6 |
| Loss | 3–9 | Jun 2001 | French Open | Clay | (Czech Republic) Petr Pála | (India) Mahesh Bhupathi (India) Leander Paes | 6–7^{(5–7)}, 3–6 |
| Loss | 3–10 | Feb 2002 | Bangalore, India | Hard | (Czech Republic) Petr Pála | (South Africa) Ellis Ferreira (United States) Rick Leach | 7–6^{(8–6)}, 6–7^{(2–7)}, 4–6, 4–6 |
| Loss | 3–11 | May 2002 | Munich, Germany | Clay | (Czech Republic) Petr Pála | (Czech Republic) Radek Štěpánek (Czech Republic) Petr Luxa | 0–6, 7–6^{(7–4)}, [9–11] |
| Loss | 3–12 | Aug 2002 | Long Island, United States | Hard | (Czech Republic) Petr Pála | (India) Mahesh Bhupathi (United States) Mike Bryan | 3–6, 4–6 |
| Loss | 3–13 | Jan 2003 | Milan, Italy | Carpet (i) | (Czech Republic) Tomáš Cibulec | (Czech Republic) Radek Štěpánek (Czech Republic) Petr Luxa | 4–6, 6–7^{(4–7)} |
| Loss | 3–14 | Feb 2003 | Marseille, France | Hard (i) | (Czech Republic) Tomáš Cibulec | (France) Sébastien Grosjean (France) Fabrice Santoro | 1–6, 4–6 |
| Win | 4–14 | Feb 2003 | Copenhagen, Denmark | Hard | (Czech Republic) Tomáš Cibulec | (Austria) Julian Knowle (Germany) Michael Kohlmann | 7–5, 5–7, 6–2 |
| Win | 5–14 | Jul 2003 | Stuttgart, Germany | Clay | (Czech Republic) Tomáš Cibulec | (Russia) Yevgeny Kafelnikov (Zimbabwe) Kevin Ullyett | 3–6, 6–3, 6–4 |
| Win | 6–14 | Feb 2004 | Milan, Italy | Carpet (i) | (United States) Jared Palmer | (Italy) Daniele Bracciali (Italy) Giorgio Galimberti | 6–4, 6–4 |
| Win | 7–14 | Sep 2004 | Shanghai, China | Hard | (United States) Jared Palmer | (United States) Rick Leach (United States) Brian MacPhie | 4–6, 7–6^{(7–4)}, 7–6^{(13–11)} |
| Win | 8–14 | Oct 2004 | Tokyo, Japan | Hard | (United States) Jared Palmer | (Czech Republic) Jiří Novák (Czech Republic) Petr Pála | 5–1, retired |
| Loss | 8–15 | Feb 2005 | Rotterdam, Netherlands | Hard (i) | (Czech Republic) Cyril Suk | (Israel) Jonathan Erlich (Israel) Andy Ram | 4–6, 6–4, 3–6 |
| Win | 9–15 | Jun 2005 | Rosmalen, Netherlands | Grass | (Czech Republic) Cyril Suk | (Czech Republic) Leoš Friedl (Czech Republic) Petr Pála | 6–3, 6–4 |
| Win | 10–15 | Feb 2006 | Costa do Sauípe, Brasil | Clay | (Czech Republic) Lukáš Dlouhý | (Poland) Mariusz Fyrstenberg (Poland) Marcin Matkowski | 6–1, 4–6, [10–3] |
| Loss | 10–16 | Apr 2006 | Valencia, Spain | Clay | (Czech Republic) Lukáš Dlouhý | (Czech Republic) David Škoch (Czech Republic) Tomáš Zíb | 4–6, 3–6 |
| Win | 11–16 | May 2006 | Estoril, Portugal | Clay | (Czech Republic) Lukáš Dlouhý | (Czech Republic) Leoš Friedl (Argentina) Lucas Arnold Ker | 6–3, 6–1 |
| Win | 12–16 | Oct 2006 | Vienna, Austria | Hard | (Czech Republic) Petr Pála | (Austria) Julian Knowle (Austria) Jürgen Melzer | 6–4, 3–6, [12–10] |
| Win | 13–16 | Feb 2007 | Costa do Sauípe, Brasil | Clay | (Czech Republic) Lukáš Dlouhý | (Spain) Albert Montañés (Spain) Rubén Ramírez Hidalgo | 6–2, 7–6^{(7–4)} |
| Loss | 13–17 | Feb 2007 | Mexico City, Mexico | Clay | (Czech Republic) Lukáš Dlouhý | (Italy) Potito Starace (Argentina) Martín Vassallo Argüello | 0–6, 2–6 |
| Loss | 13–18 | Jun 2007 | French Open | Clay | (Czech Republic) Lukáš Dlouhý | (The Bahamas) Mark Knowles (Canada) Daniel Nestor | 6–2, 3–6, 4–6 |
| Win | 14–18 | Jul 2007 | Gstaad, Switzerland | Clay | (Czech Republic) František Čermák | (France) Marc Gicquel (France) Florent Serra | 7–5, 5–7, [10–7] |
| Win | 15–18 | Aug 2007 | Montreal, Canada | Hard | (India) Mahesh Bhupathi | (Australia) Paul Hanley (Zimbabwe) Kevin Ullyett | 6–4, 6–4 |
| Loss | 15–19 | Sep 2007 | US Open | Hard | (Czech Republic) Lukáš Dlouhý | (Sweden) Simon Aspelin (Austria) Julian Knowle | 5–7, 4–6 |
| Win | 16–19 | Feb 2008 | Marseille, France | Hard | (Czech Republic) Martin Damm | (Switzerland) Yves Allegro (South Africa) Jeff Coetzee | 7–6^{(7–0)}, 7–5 |
| Loss | 16–20 | Mar 2008 | Dubai, UAE | Hard | (Czech Republic) Martin Damm | (India) Mahesh Bhupathi (The Bahamas) Mark Knowles | 5–7, 6–7^{(7–9)} |

== Doubles performance timeline ==
Key
| W | F | SF | QF | #R | RR | Q# | DNQ | A | NH |

(W) winner; (F) finalist; (SF) semifinalist; (QF) quarterfinalist; (#R) rounds 4, 3, 2, 1; (RR) round-robin stage; (Q#) qualification round; (DNQ) did not qualify; (A) absent; (NH) not held; (SR) strike rate (events won / competed); (W–L) win–loss record.

| Tournament | 1990 | 1991 | 1992 | 1993 | 1994 | 1995 | 1996 | 1997 | 1998 | 1999 | 2000 | 2001 | 2002 | 2003 | 2004 | 2005 | 2006 | 2007 | Career SR |
|---|---|---|---|---|---|---|---|---|---|---|---|---|---|---|---|---|---|---|---|
| Australian Open | A | A | A | A | A | A | A | 1R | A | 3R | 1R | 2R | 3R | 1R | 1R | 2R | 2R | 2R | 0 / 10 |
| French Open | A | A | A | A | A | A | 2R | 1R | 1R | 1R | 2R | F | 1R | 3R | 2R | 2R | SF | F | 0 / 11 |
| Wimbledon | A | A | A | A | A | A | 3R | SF | 2R | 2R | 2R | QF | 1R | 1R | 3R | 3R | QF | QF | 0 / 11 |
| U.S. Open | A | A | A | A | A | A | 1R | A | 1R | 1R | 1R | 3R | 2R | 2R | 3R | QF | 2R | F | 0 / 11 |
| Year-end ranking | 408 | 426 | 643 | 247 | 208 | 141 | 28 | 50 | 60 | 76 | 59 | 17 | 34 | 27 | 20 | 27 | 15 | 5 | N / A |
