= Magnus Norman =

Swedish tennis player and coach

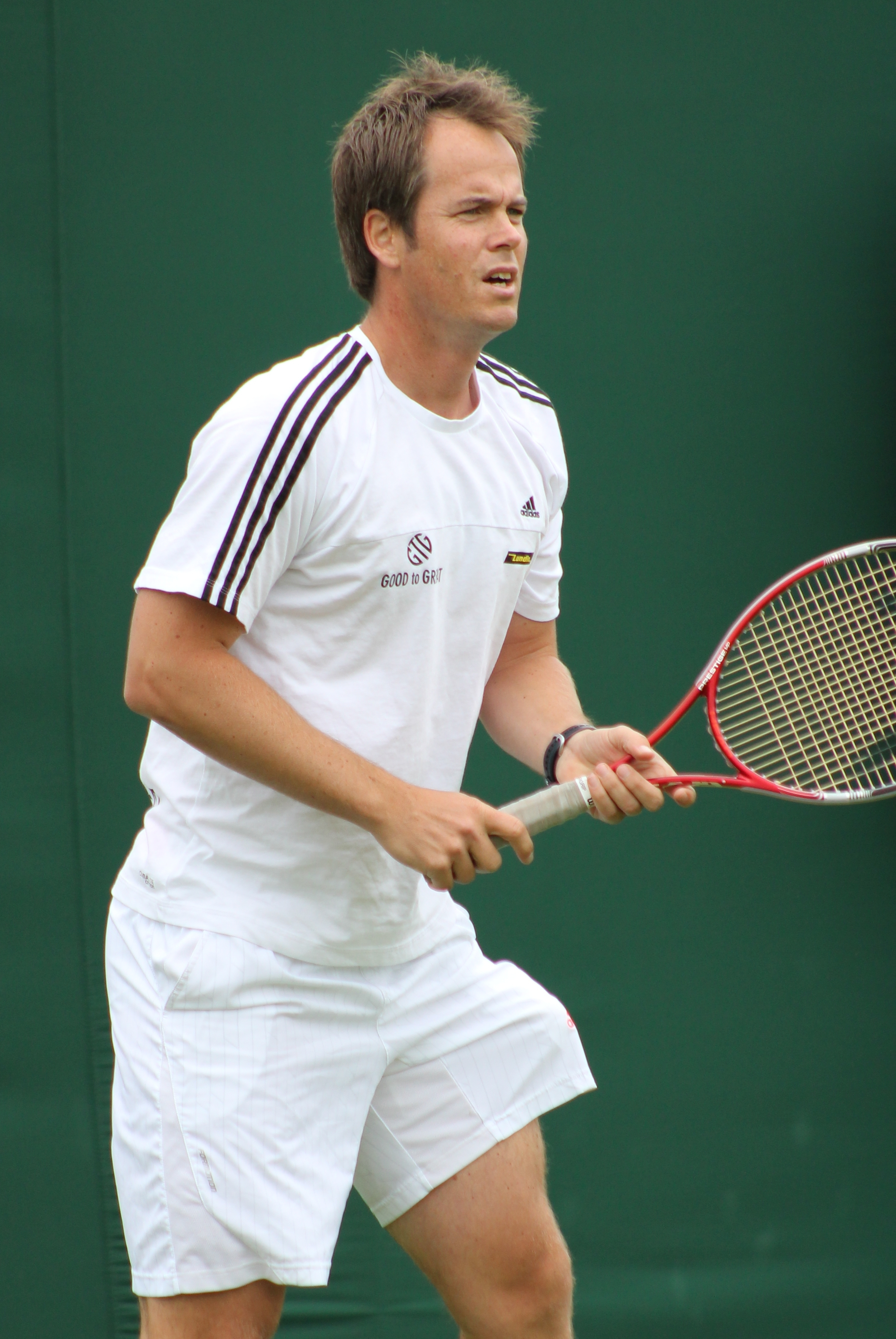
- Magnus Norman in 2013
- Country (sports): Sweden
- Residence: Monte Carlo, Monaco
- Born: 30 May 1976 (age 50) Filipstad, Sweden
- Height: 1.88 m (6 ft 2 in)
- Turned pro: 1995
- Retired: 2004 (last match played in September 2003)
- Plays: Right-handed (two-handed backhand)
- Coach: Fredrik Rosengren (1999–2003); Mikael Tillström (2003)
- Prize money: US$4,537,247

Singles
- Career record: 244–177 (58.0%)
- Career titles: 12
- Highest ranking: No. 2 (12 June 2000)

Grand Slam singles results
- Australian Open: SF (2000)
- French Open: F (2000)
- Wimbledon: 3R (1997, 1999)
- US Open: 4R (1999, 2000)

Other tournaments
- Tour Finals: RR (2000)
- Olympic Games: 3R (2000)

Doubles
- Career record: 24–48 (33.3%)
- Career titles: 0
- Highest ranking: No. 133 (7 May 2001)

Team competitions
- Davis Cup: W (1998)

Coaching career (2008–present)
- Thomas Johansson (2008); Robin Söderling (2009–2010); Stan Wawrinka (2013–2017, 2018–2020, 2022–2026); Jannik Sinner (2027-)

Coaching achievements
- Coachee singles titles total: 15
- List of notable tournaments (with champion) Australian Open (Wawrinka); French Open (Wawrinka); US Open (Wawrinka); 2x ATP World Tour Masters 1000 (Söderling, Wawrinka); Davis Cup (Wawrinka)

Coaching awards and records
- Awards ATP Coach of the Year (2016)

Magnus Norman (born 30 May 1976) is a Swedish former professional tennis player and current coach. He was ranked world No. 2 in men's singles by the Association of Tennis Professionals (ATP), in June 2000. Norman won twelve ATP Tour singles titles, including a Masters event at the 2000 Rome Masters, and was runner-up at a major at the 2000 French Open.

Since retiring from the sport in 2004, Norman has coached Thomas Johansson, Robin Söderling, and Stan Wawrinka. He owns the Good to Great Tennis Academy. Among its students are Wawrinka, Gaël Monfils, and Grigor Dimitrov. Norman also plays bandy, a sport he played in his youth before deciding to concentrate on tennis.

== Tennis career ==
Norman turned professional in 1995 when he was 19. His career was cut short when injuries struck during his peak in late 2000, after he reached semifinals of the Australian Open and the final of the French Open, as well as winning a Masters title in Rome and several other titles earlier during the season. He was on the verge of becoming world No. 1. His last match was played in September 2003 when he retired in the third round against Jiří Novák after just 3 games. He retired from tennis due to major hip and knee injuries in 2004 when he was only 27 and competed for just over 8 years on the ATP Tour.

=== Juniors ===
As a junior Norman posted a singles win–loss record of 46–24.

=== Professional playing career ===
==== 1997-1998 ====
In June 1997, Norman made his first impact on the tour by reaching the quarterfinals of French Open. His most notable match of the tournament was his third round match against world No. 1 Pete Sampras, when Norman pulled off an upset by defeating the heavily favored American in four sets. He then upset former semifinalist and Olympic gold medalist Marc Rosset in 4 sets. Eventually Norman would lose to Belgian qualifier Filip Dewulf in four sets. As a result of this run, Norman cracked the Top 50 for the first time in his career. A month later at Wimbledon, he astonished the tennis world even more when he defeated 2nd seed, 2-time finalist and 2-time semifinalist Goran Ivanišević in the second round in a titanic battle, 14–12 in the fifth set. A week later, Norman captured his first title on the ATP Tour by winning Swedish Open in Båstad by defeating Spaniard Juan Antonio Marín in straight sets. In October he reached another final in Ostrava, but has to retire after losing the first set in less than half an hour. He finished the year as world No. 22.

Norman underwent corrective surgery for a heart valve condition in 1998 because of an irregular heartbeat. During the year he had a key role in Sweden's Davis Cup victory, which remained Sweden's last title to date.

==== 1999-2000 ====
Norman experienced tremendous success during the first half of 2000: he reached the semifinals of the Australian Open, won the Rome Masters, beating Gustavo Kuerten of Brazil in 4 sets, and was the runner-up at the French Open, where he defeated Thierry Guardiola, Fabrice Santoro, Sargis Sargsian, Andrei Medvedev, Marat Safin and Franco Squillari before Kuerten took revenge in the final, after Norman saved 10 championship points. Had he won the match he would have become the first Swede since his idol Stefan Edberg to ascend to the world No. 1 position. The loss also snapped his streak of winning 8 consecutive finals dating to 1998.

His decline from persistent major injuries in the hips and knees began late that year at the Sydney Olympics, when he lost in the third round to Frenchman Arnaud Di Pasquale in straight sets (Di Pasquale went on to win the bronze medal).

In 1999 and 2000, Norman won 10 titles in total, which was more than anyone else on the ATP Tour during that period.

=== After retirement ===
Since retiring as a player with a bittersweet career at such a young age, Norman decided to spend time away from tennis; he cursed the sport: "I didn't watch any tennis, didn't pick up a racquet." In 2005 he served as the Board of the Swedish Tennis Federation, and also worked with a Swedish Junior Team for a while. Between 2006 and 2008, he studied marketing and economics at IHM Business school in Stockholm. He also worked conurrently at Catella Fund Management.

Norman gradually realized that he still had a lot to give back to tennis, saying that he thought it was really good for him to be away from tennis, have other friends and develop outside the tennis world, but he wanted to hang out in locker rooms; he missed tennis. And because of his tragic career, Norman said he felt he still had something to prove to himself with respect to tennis, that he "left something on the table" in his career. With this motivation, he decided to pick up tennis once more. He started working with former doubles partner Thomas Johansson in the latter stages of Johansson's career during his vacation time in 2008, at the same time serving as coach of the Swedish Olympic Tennis team. He guided Sweden to silver medals in men's doubles (Johansson and Simon Aspelin).

==== Coaching ====
Norman has gradually built himself a reputation as one of the most respected tennis coaches around the world. After Johansson, Norman left Catella altogether to begin coaching fellow Swedish Robin Söderling who under his wing reached consecutive Grand Slam finals at the French Open in 2009 and 2010, won the Paris Masters in 2010, qualified for the ATP World Tour Finals both years and reached a career-high world No. 4 before they parted by the end of 2010 season as Norman decided that he wanted to spend more time with his young family and Söderling needed a full-time coach. Söderling took Norman's recommendation for the coach and was on the track of another good season before injuries and mononucleosis ended his career, 7 months after Norman's departure when he was still ranked No. 5 in the world and having just won a title with 2 consecutive top 10 wins in the semifinal and finals with the loss of just 5 games in total during the process.

Norman was then wanted by a few prominent players on tour as their coach; Norman declined the requests as he still needs more time with his family and he had just started a new tennis academy that needed careful management, called the Good to Great Tennis Academy in 2011 with fellow former Swedish tennis players Mikael Tillström and Nicklas Kulti.

He eventually decided to coach Stan Wawrinka starting from the 2013 season, who has since won three Grand Slams: the 2014 Australian Open, 2015 French Open, and the 2016 US Open; an ATP World Tour Masters 1000 title at the 2014 Monte-Carlo Masters; and Switzerland's maiden Davis Cup title in 2014, while also qualifying for the Tour Finals every year since their partnership and ending significant losing streaks against Rafael Nadal and Novak Djokovic in the process (as well as earning previously rare wins over compatriot Roger Federer) and reached world No. 3. As a recognition of his achievements Norman won the inaugural ATP Coach of the Year award in 2016.

In November 2026, it was announced that Norman would join Jannik Sinner's coaching staff alongside Simone Vagnozzi starting in December 2026, replacing Darren Cahill.

== Playing style ==
Magnus Norman was known as one of the most powerful and fittest athletes on tour. On top of that, he is known for his work ethic and his perfectionism on court. During earlier stages of career he played serve and volley style tennis, influenced by his idol Stefan Edberg, but later started employing aggressive baseline play. Norman possessed a very dangerous forehand and he would often flatten his groundstrokes whenever he had a chance and go for winner. He could also generate great pace on his flat two-handed backhand. Norman also utilized drop shots and attacked the net on occasion.

== Personal life ==
Norman began playing tennis at the age of 8 when his grandmother gave him a birthday gift a racquet. He is the oldest child of his father, Leif (who played bandy in the Swedish second division), and his mother, Leena (who was a swimmer on the Sweden national team). He has a younger brother, Marcus, who also plays bandy and is the Secretary General of the Swedish Bandy Association.

He briefly dated Swiss tennis player Martina Hingis, from late May to mid October in 2000.

== Significant finals ==
=== Grand Slam finals ===
==== Singles: 1 (1 runner-up) ====
Result	Year	Championship	Surface	Opponent	Score
Loss	2000	French Open	Clay	(Brazil) Gustavo Kuerten	2–6, 3–6, 6–2, 6–7^{(6–8)}

=== Masters Series finals ===
==== Singles: 1 (1 title) ====
Result	Year	Tournament	Surface	Opponent	Score
Win	2000	Rome Masters	Clay	(Brazil) Gustavo Kuerten	6–3, 4–6, 6–4, 6–4

== Career finals ==
=== Singles: 18 (12 titles, 6 runner-ups) ===
Legend Grand Slam tournaments (0–1) Tennis Masters Cup (0–0) ATP Masters Series (1–0) ATP International Series Gold (1–1) ATP International Series (10–3)	Titles by surface Hard (5–3) Grass (0–0) Clay (7–2) Carpet (0–1)

Result	W–L	Date	Tournament	Surface	Opponent	Score
Win	1–0	Jul 1997	Båstad, Sweden	Clay	(Spain) Juan Antonio Marín	7–5, 6–2
Loss	1–1	Oct 1997	Ostrava, Czech Republic	Carpet (i)	(Slovakia) Karol Kučera	2–6 ret.
Loss	1–2	Jul 1998	Umag, Croatia	Clay	(Czech Republic) Bohdan Ulihrach	3–6, 6–7^{(0–7)}
Win	2–2	Aug 1998	Amsterdam, Netherlands	Clay	(Australia) Richard Fromberg	6–3, 6–3, 2–6, 6–4
Win	3–2	Apr 1999	Orlando, USA	Clay	(Argentina) Guillermo Cañas	6–0, 6–3
Win	4–2	Jul 1999	Stuttgart, Germany	Clay	(Germany) Tommy Haas	6–7^{(6–8)}, 4–6, 7–6^{(9–7)}, 6–0, 6–3
Win	5–2	Aug 1999	Umag, Croatia	Clay	(United States) Jeff Tarango	6–2, 6–4
Win	6–2	Aug 1999	Long Island, USA	Hard	(Spain) Àlex Corretja	7–6^{(7–4)}, 4–6, 6–3
Win	7–2	Oct 1999	Shanghai, China	Hard	(Chile) Marcelo Ríos	2–6, 6–3, 7–5
Win	8–2	Jan 2000	Auckland, New Zealand	Hard	(United States) Michael Chang	3–6, 6–3, 7–5
Win	9–2	May 2000	Rome, Italy	Clay	(Brazil) Gustavo Kuerten	6–3, 4–6, 6–4, 6–4
Loss	9–3	Jun 2000	French Open, Paris, France	Clay	(Brazil) Gustavo Kuerten	2–6, 3–6, 6–2, 6–7^{(6–8)}
Win	10–3	Jul 2000	Båstad, Sweden	Clay	(Sweden) Andreas Vinciguerra	6–1, 7–6^{(8–6)}
Win	11–3	Aug 2000	Long Island, USA	Hard	(Sweden) Thomas Enqvist	6–3, 5–7, 7–5
Win	12–3	Oct 2000	Shanghai, China	Hard	(Netherlands) Sjeng Schalken	6–4, 4–6, 6–3
Loss	12–4	Jan 2001	Sydney, Australia	Hard	(Australia) Lleyton Hewitt	4–6, 1–6
Loss	12–5	Mar 2001	Scottsdale, USA	Hard	(Spain) Francisco Clavet	4–6, 2–6
Loss	12–6	Oct 2002	Tokyo, Japan	Hard	(Denmark) Kenneth Carlsen	6–7^{(6–8)}, 3–6

=== Doubles: 1 (1 runner-up) ===
Outcome	W–L	Date	Tournament	Surface	Partner	Opponent	Score
Loss	0–1	Jan 1997	Doha, Qatar	Hard	(Sweden) Patrik Fredriksson	(Netherlands) Jacco Eltingh (Netherlands) Paul Haarhuis	3–6, 2–6

== Performance timeline ==
=== Singles ===
Key
W	F	SF	QF	#R	RR	Q#	P#	DNQ	A	Z#	PO	G	S	B	NMS	NTI	P	NH

(W) winner; (F) finalist; (SF) semifinalist; (QF) quarterfinalist; (#R) rounds 4, 3, 2, 1; (RR) round-robin stage; (Q#) qualification round; (DNQ) did not qualify; (A) absent; (NH) not held; (SR) strike rate (events won / competed); (W–L) win–loss record.

				Professional Career										
Tournament	1992	1993	1994	1995	1996	1997	1998	1999	2000	2001	2002	2003	SR	W–L
Grand Slam tournaments
Australian Open	A	Q2	Q1	A	1R	1R	1R	2R	SF	4R	A	A	0 / 6	9–6
French Open	A	A	A	A	2R	QF	2R	1R	F	1R	1R	1R	0 / 8	12–8
Wimbledon	A	A	A	A	A	3R	1R	3R	2R	A	A	A	0 / 4	5–4
US Open	A	A	A	A	A	2R	2R	4R	4R	A	1R	1R	0 / 6	8–6
Win–loss	0–0	0–0	0–0	0–0	1–2	7–4	2–4	6–4	15–4	3–2	0–2	0–2	0 / 24	34–24
Year-end championships
Tennis Masters Cup	Did not qualify								RR	Did not qualify			0 / 1	0–3
ATP Masters Series
Indian Wells Masters	A	A	A	A	A	A	2R	A	QF	1R	A	Q2	0 / 3	4–3
Miami Masters	A	A	A	A	A	A	1R	2R	3R	3R	A	Q2	0 / 4	3–4
Monte-Carlo Masters	A	A	A	A	A	A	2R	A	2R	2R	1R	3R	0 / 5	5–5
Rome Masters	A	A	A	A	Q2	A	2R	A	W	1R	1R	1R	1 / 5	7–4
Hamburg Masters	A	A	A	A	A	A	1R	A	QF	2R	A	A	0 / 3	4–3
Canada Masters	A	A	A	A	A	A	A	A	1R	2R	1R	A	0 / 3	1–3
Cincinnati Masters	A	A	A	A	A	A	A	A	2R	1R	1R	A	0 / 3	1–3
Stuttgart Masters^{1}	1R	A	A	A	A	A	2R	3R	3R	A	2R	A	0 / 5	3–5
Paris Masters	A	A	A	A	A	2R	2R	1R	2R	A	A	A	0 / 4	2–4
Win–loss	0–1	0–0	0–0	0–0	0–0	1–1	5–7	2–3	15–8	4–7	1–5	2–2	1 / 35	30–34
Career statistics
Finals	0	0	0	0	0	2	2	5	6	2	1	0	18	
Titles	0	0	0	0	0	1	1	5	5	0	0	0	12	
Hard Win–loss	0–0	0–0	0–0	0–0	6–6	10–11	6–13	23–11	39–15	19–12	7–10	5–7	115–85	
Clay Win–loss	0–0	0–0	0–0	3–2	7–4	19–6	17–13	19–7	27–8	5–9	5–9	5–12	107–70	
Grass Win–loss	0–0	0–0	0–0	0–0	0–0	2–2	2–2	2–3	1–1	0–0	0–0	0–0	7–8	
Carpet Win–loss	0–1	0–0	0–0	0–0	0–0	11–7	3–3	0–1	0–1	1–1	0–0	0–0	15–14	
Overall win–loss	0–1	0–0	0–0	3–2	13–10	42–26	28–31	44–22	67–25	25–22	12–19	10–19	244–177	
Win %	0%	–	–	60%	57%	62%	47%	67%	73%	53%	40%	34%	57.96%	
Year-end ranking	690	588	1003	170	86	22	52	15	4	49	107	125		

^{1}Held in Stockholm till 1994, Stuttgart Masters from 1995 till 2001, Madrid Masters from 2002 to 2008.

== Top 10 wins ==
Season	1992	1993	1994	1995	1996	1997	1998	1999	2000	2001	2002	2003	Total
Wins	0	0	0	0	0	3	1	4	3	0	1	0	12

#	Player	Rank	Event	Surface	Rd	Score	NR
1997
1.	(United States) Pete Sampras	1	French Open, Paris, France	Clay	3R	6–2, 6–4, 2–6, 6–4	65
2.	(Croatia) Goran Ivanišević	3	Wimbledon, London, United Kingdom	Grass	2R	6–3, 2–6, 7–6^{(7–4)}, 4–6, 14–12	38
3.	(Spain) Sergi Bruguera	8	Ostrava, Czech Republic	Carpet (i)	QF	6–4, 6–7^{(4–7)}, 7–5	27
1998
4.	(Spain) Àlex Corretja	9	Indian Wells, United States	Hard	1R	7–5, 6–3	23
1999
5.	(Brazil) Gustavo Kuerten	5	Stuttgart, Germany	Clay	2R	5–2, ret.	49
6.	(Russia) Yevgeny Kafelnikov	3	Long Island, United States	Hard	QF	3–6, 6–3, 6–1	34
7.	(Chile) Marcelo Ríos	7	Shanghai, China	Hard	F	2–6, 6–3, 7–5	23
8.	(Ecuador) Nicolás Lapentti	8	Stockholm, Sweden	Hard (i)	QF	6–1, 6–4	19
2000
9.	(Germany) Nicolas Kiefer	4	Australian Open, Melbourne, Australia	Hard	QF	3–6, 6–3, 6–1, 7–6^{(7–4)}	11
10.	(Brazil) Gustavo Kuerten	6	Rome, Italy	Clay	F	6–3, 4–6, 6–4, 6–4	4
11.	(Sweden) Thomas Enqvist	7	Long Island, United States	Hard	F	6–3, 5–7, 7–5	3
2002
12.	(Spain) Juan Carlos Ferrero	6	Tokyo, Japan	Hard	2R	6–3, 6–3	212

Awards and achievements
Preceded by None	ATP Coach of the Year; 2016	Succeeded by (South Africa) Neville Godwin
