= Sjeng Schalken =

Dutch tennis player

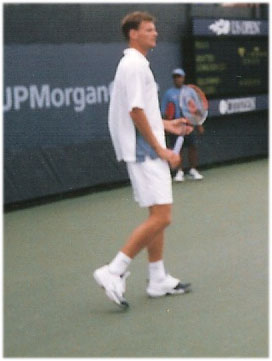
- Country (sports): Netherlands
- Residence: Monte Carlo, Monaco
- Born: 8 September 1976 (age 49) Weert, Netherlands
- Height: 1.93 m (6 ft 4 in)
- Turned pro: 1994
- Retired: 2007
- Plays: Right-handed (one-handed backhand)
- Prize money: $5,192,798

Singles
- Career record: 293–267
- Career titles: 9
- Highest ranking: No. 11 (21 April 2003)

Grand Slam singles results
- Australian Open: 4R (2004)
- French Open: 3R (1999, 2002, 2003)
- Wimbledon: QF (2002, 2003, 2004)
- US Open: SF (2002)

Doubles
- Career record: 128–133
- Career titles: 6
- Highest ranking: No. 21 (20 May 2002)

Grand Slam doubles results
- Australian Open: 3R (2002)
- French Open: 2R (1996, 2001)
- Wimbledon: QF (2001)
- US Open: SF (2001)

Grand Slam mixed doubles results
- Wimbledon: 1R (1996)
- Last updated on: 10 January 2022.

Sjeng Schalken (Dutch pronunciation: [ɕɛŋ ˈsxɑlkə(n)]; born 8 September 1976) is a coach and a former professional tennis player from the Netherlands.

== Playing style ==
A right-handed baseliner with a single-handed backhand, Schalken's game is characterised by his consistency of both wings and his continental technique on both the forehand and backhand. The latter is his major weapon, a rallying shot that is also capable of being struck for winners either cross-court or down the line. The player he admired most while growing up was Ivan Lendl.

Schalken is known for his placid on-court demeanour, seemingly reacting in the same manner whether trailing or leading. But as a junior and a young pro he had an explosive temper that, he has stated, hindered him in many matches and caused him to lose through not thinking clearly. Only in 1999 did he manage to suppress his emotional side while on court and develop a more level-headed temperament, although he was disqualified from the Nasdaq-100 Open in 2004 for verbally abusing the umpire.

== Career ==
=== Juniors ===
Schalken was an outstanding junior, winning the US Open junior event in 1994, turning professional the same year.

Junior Grand Slam results – Singles:

Australian Open: A (-)
French Open: 3R (1993, 1994)
Wimbledon: SF (1994)
US Open: W (1994)

== Junior Grand Slam finals ==
=== Singles: 1 (title) ===
Result	Year	Tournament	Surface	Opponent	Score
Win	1994	US Open	Hard	(Morocco) Mehdi Tahiri	6–2, 7–6

=== Pro tour ===
He won his first career title on clay in Valencia at the age of 19, defeating Gilbert Schaller in the final. He was the youngest winner on tour for that year, 1995, and the next year as well when he defeated Younes El Aynaoui in the final in Jakarta for his second title. Schalken managed to win at least one ATP tournament eight out of nine years from 1995 to 2003, the sole exception being 1998.

Schalken won his fourth title against Tommy Haas in Auckland in January 1999, exactly three years after his younger brother died of cancer, and dedicated the victory to him. He overcame Marcelo Ríos to win the event in Boston in 1997.

During the 1990s Schalken's Grand Slam record was meagre, amassing a win/loss total of only 4–14 up until the start of 1999. It took him until his 29th major to finally get past the third round. At Wimbledon he suffered final-set defeats three years in a row, losing in 1998 to Jan-Michael Gambill 8–6 in the fifth, in 1999 to Jim Courier 13–11 in the fifth, and in 2000 in a 5-hour, 5-minute marathon to Mark Philippoussis 20–18 in the deciding set, the longest ever final set in Wimbledon men's singles history at the time (his record was later beaten by John Isner and Nicolas Mahut in 2010). Afterwards he was moved to comment, "I think Wimbledon doesn't want to have me in the fourth round."

It was at the very same tournament two years later that Schalken made his Grand Slam breakthrough. He came into Wimbledon on the back of an outstanding grass-court season, in which he had made the semifinals at Queen's Club losing to eventual champion and world No. 1 Lleyton Hewitt before going on to win the title the following week in 's-Hertogenbosch, his first title on home soil and his first trophy on grass. Benefiting from a draw that opened up, he progressed past unseeded big servers Jeff Morrison and Jan Vacek in straight sets to reach a quarterfinal encounter with Hewitt, where he once again came undone in five sets. From being 6–2, 6–2 down, he squeezed out a third set tiebreak, ran away with the fourth 6–1 and was twice up a break early in the deciding set, as well as having a chance to serve for the match at 5–5, but his advantage was always short-lived; Hewitt broke to take the contest 7–5 in the fifth. However, Schalken remained the only man to take any sets off Hewitt for the entire fortnight, and finished with a grass-court record of 12–2, second only to the world No. 1 (14–0).

Buoyed by this success, he very soon surpassed his quarterfinal achievement at the US Open, where he benefited in the opening round from a retirement by Mark Philippoussis when the Australian reinjured his troublesome knee, having led two sets to love. Schalken moved through to the second week beating Ivan Ljubičić and Sargis Sargsian, where on the Arthur Ashe Stadium, he bested former world No. 1 Gustavo Kuerten in the last 16 and Fernando González in the quarters. Both matches were littered with tiebreaks and decided upon them too, with Schalken proving the steadier man in the end; however, he still lost as many as he won, and this proved to be his undoing in the semifinals against eventual champion Pete Sampras, coming out on the wrong end of two close tiebreaks before falling 6–2 in the third set.

2003 proved to be Schalken's most solid year, in which he compiled a best-ever 41–24 win–loss record and once again turned in good Slam performances at Wimbledon and the US Open. In early May 2003, he reached a career-high singles ranking of world No. 11 and stood one more outstanding result away from the top 10, but a quarterfinal loss in Munich to Yevgeny Kafelnikov scuppered his chances. Nevertheless, he once more excelled on grass, defending his 's-Hertogenbosch title with a repeat win over Frenchman Arnaud Clément in the final, before matching the previous year's quarterfinal at Wimbledon. Again he lost to the eventual champion, but this time the outcome was never in doubt, as he lost 6–3, 6–4, 6–4 to Roger Federer for the fourth time that year in straight sets.

After an unremarkable summer hardcourt season, Schalken arrived at the US Open and successfully defended the majority of his semifinalist points; for the fourth time in a little over a year he lost to the future champion, this time a straight-sets demolition at the hands of Andy Roddick in the quarters. However, he got over the loss quickly; the following week he flew south to the tournament in Costa do Sauipe, Brazil, held on hardcourt for the last time, and captured the title with a 6–2, 6–4 win over Rainer Schüttler, his third win over the German that year after Wimbledon and US Open victories. With the title Schalken became only the second active player after Andre Agassi to win tournaments on five different continents.

Schalken won just one match in a series of indoor tournaments that October, but other things were on his mind; he married his fiancée Ricky Pfennings on 21 November. The following year, 2004, began promisingly enough with a semifinal showing in Chennai followed by a first ever run to the second week in Australia, where he was defeated by Andy Roddick. But his form then took a sharp downturn and he managed only one quarterfinal in the next five months, a period that reached its lowest point when he was defaulted from his match with Guillermo Cañas at the Masters Series event in Miami for verbally abusing the umpire. There were other dramatic moments too; the weekend before the Rome Masters tournament, a fire broke out in the hotel where many players were staying including Schalken and his wife. They were both trapped in their room and had to jump down from their balcony to the one below, which happened to be occupied by Andy Roddick who helped them to land safely.

Only when Schalken had to pull out of Roland Garros, ending a sequence of 35 straight majors played, did it become clear that something was wrong physically. At the end of the year he was diagnosed with mononucleosis, a debilitating virus that limited his strength; his one achievement was to reach a third consecutive Wimbledon quarterfinal, where for the third time in the space of a year he fell in straight sets to Andy Roddick in a 7–6, 7–6, 6–3 defeat.

Having to miss the US Open, Schalken returned in the autumn without success and then played at the Australian Open the following January, where he lost to big-serving Swede Joachim Johansson in straight sets. His 2005 season proved as limited as the second half of 2004 had been, his most notable results being two five-set victories against Swiss players Marco Chiudinelli and Stanislas Wawrinka in the Netherlands' Davis Cup win over Switzerland. He injured his right Achilles tendon in the spring and was forced off the tour in July, since then his only tournament at any level to date has been a semifinal showing in the Bergamo Challenger in Italy in February 2006.

== ATP career finals ==
=== Singles: 12 (9 titles, 3 runner-ups) ===
Legend Grand Slam Tournaments (0–0) ATP World Tour Finals (0–0) ATP World Tour Masters Series (0–0) ATP Championship Series (1–1) ATP World Series (8–2)	Finals by surface Hard (6–2) Clay (1–0) Grass (2–0) Carpet (0–1)	Finals by setting Outdoors (8–2) Indoors (1–1)

Result	W–L	Date	Tournament	Tier	Surface	Opponent	Score
Win	1–0	Oct 1995	Valencia, Spain	World Series	Clay	(Austria) Gilbert Schaller	6–4, 6–2
Win	2–0	Jan 1996	Jakarta, Indonesia	World Series	Hard	(Morocco) Younes El Aynaoui	6–3, 6–2
Win	3–0	Aug 1997	Boston, United States	World Series	Hard	(Chile) Marcelo Ríos	7–5, 6–3
Win	4–0	Jan 1999	Auckland, New Zealand	World Series	Hard	(Germany) Tommy Haas	6–4, 6–4
Win	5–0	Oct 2000	Tokyo, Japan	Championship Series	Hard	(Ecuador) Nicolás Lapentti	6–4, 3–6, 6–1
Loss	5–1	Oct 2000	Shanghai, China	International Series	Hard	(Sweden) Magnus Norman	4–6, 6–4, 3–6
Loss	5–2	Aug 2001	Washington, United States	Championship Series	Hard	(United States) Andy Roddick	2–6, 3–6
Win	6–2	Oct 2001	Stockholm, Sweden	International Series	Hard	(Finland) Jarkko Nieminen	3–6, 6–3, 6–3, 4–6, 6–3
Win	7–2	Jun 2002	's-Hertogenbosch, Netherlands	International Series	Grass	(France) Arnaud Clément	3–6, 6–3, 6–2
Loss	7–3	Oct 2002	Moscow, Russia	International Series	Carpet	(France) Paul-Henri Mathieu	6–4, 2–6, 0–6
Win	8–3	Jun 2003	's-Hertogenbosch, Netherlands	International Series	Grass	(France) Arnaud Clément	6–3, 6–4
Win	9–3	Sep 2003	Costa do Sauipe, Brazil	International Series	Hard	(Germany) Rainer Schüttler	6–2, 6–4

=== Doubles: 9 (6 titles, 3 runner-ups) ===
Legend Grand Slam Tournaments (0–0) ATP World Tour Finals (0–0) ATP World Tour Masters Series (0–0) ATP Championship Series (0–0) ATP World Series (6–3)	Finals by surface Hard (1–3) Clay (3–0) Grass (1–0) Carpet (1–0)	Finals by setting Outdoors (5–3) Indoors (1–0)

Result	W–L	Date	Tournament	Tier	Surface	Partner	Opponents	Score
Win	1–0	Jul 1995	Amsterdam, Netherlands	World Series	Clay	(Chile) Marcelo Ríos	(Australia) Wayne Arthurs (United Kingdom) Neil Broad	7–6, 6–2
Loss	1–1	Sep 1998	Tashkent, Uzbekistan	International Series	Hard	(Denmark) Kenneth Carlsen	(Italy) Stefano Pescosolido (Italy) Laurence Tieleman	5–7, 6–4, 5–7
Win	2–1	Aug 1999	Amsterdam, Netherlands	World Series	Clay	(Netherlands) Paul Haarhuis	(United States) Devin Bowen (Israel) Eyal Ran	6–3, 6–2
Win	3–1	Oct 2000	Shanghai, China	International Series	Hard	(Netherlands) Paul Haarhuis	(Czech Republic) Petr Pála (Czech Republic) Pavel Vízner	6–2, 3–6, 6–4
Win	4–1	Feb 2001	Milan, Italy	International Series	Carpet	(Netherlands) Paul Haarhuis	(Sweden) Johan Landsberg (Belgium) Tom Vanhoudt	7–6^{(7–5)}, 7–6^{(7–4)}
Loss	4–2	Mar 2001	Scottsdale, United States	International Series	Hard	(Chile) Marcelo Ríos	(United States) Donald Johnson (United States) Jared Palmer	6–7^{(3–7)}, 2–6
Win	5–2	Jun 2001	's-Hertogenbosch, Netherlands	International Series	Grass	(Netherlands) Paul Haarhuis	(Czech Republic) Martin Damm (Czech Republic) Cyril Suk	6–4, 6–4
Win	6–2	Jul 2001	Amsterdam, Netherlands	International Series	Clay	(Netherlands) Paul Haarhuis	(Spain) Àlex Corretja (Argentina) Luis Lobo	6–4, 6–2
Loss	6–3	Aug 2003	Los Angeles, United States	International Series	Hard	(Australia) Joshua Eagle	(United States) Jan-Michael Gambill (United States) Travis Parrott	4–6, 6–3, 5–7

== ATP Challenger and ITF Futures finals ==
=== Singles: 4 (3–1) ===
Legend ATP Challenger (3–1) ITF Futures (0–0)	Finals by surface Hard (0–0) Clay (3–1) Grass (0–0) Carpet (0–0)

Result	W–L	Date	Tournament	Tier	Surface	Opponent	Score
Win	1–0	Oct 1994	Guayaquil, Ecuador	Challenger	Clay	(Norway) Christian Ruud	6–1, 6–4
Loss	1–1	Nov 1994	Guadalajara, Mexico	Challenger	Clay	(United States) Bryan Shelton	4–6, 6–3, 2–6
Win	2–1	Apr 1995	Monte Carlo, Monaco	Challenger	Clay	(Denmark) Frederik Fetterlein	6–3, 6–4
Win	3–1	May 2003	Prague, Czech Republic	Challenger	Clay	(Spain) Albert Montañés	1–6, 6–1, 6–4

=== Doubles: 1 (0–1) ===
Legend ATP Challenger (0–1) ITF Futures (0–0)	Finals by surface Hard (0–0) Clay (0–0) Grass (0–0) Carpet (0–1)

Result	W–L	Date	Tournament	Tier	Surface	Partner	Opponents	Score
Loss	0–1	Dec 1994	Prostějov, Czech Republic	Challenger	Carpet	(Netherlands) Joost Winnink	(Czech Republic) Jiří Novák (Czech Republic) Radomír Vašek	7–6, 3–6, 4–6

== Performance timelines ==
Key
W	F	SF	QF	#R	RR	Q#	DNQ	A	NH

(W) winner; (F) finalist; (SF) semifinalist; (QF) quarterfinalist; (#R) rounds 4, 3, 2, 1; (RR) round-robin stage; (Q#) qualification round; (DNQ) did not qualify; (A) absent; (NH) not held; (SR) strike rate (events won / competed); (W–L) win–loss record.

=== Singles ===
Tournament	1994	1995	1996	1997	1998	1999	2000	2001	2002	2003	2004	2005	SR	W–L	Win %
Grand Slam tournaments
Australian Open	A	A	1R	1R	1R	2R	2R	1R	1R	2R	4R	1R	0 / 10	6–10	38%
French Open	Q3	Q1	2R	1R	1R	3R	1R	2R	3R	3R	A	A	0 / 8	8–8	50%
Wimbledon	Q1	1R	1R	1R	1R	3R	3R	3R	QF	QF	QF	A	0 / 10	18–10	64%
US Open	Q1	1R	3R	2R	1R	1R	3R	3R	SF	QF	A	A	0 / 9	16–9	64%
Win–loss	0–0	0–2	3–4	1–4	0–4	5–4	5–4	5–4	11–4	11–4	7–2	0–1	0 / 37	48–37	56%
ATP Tour Masters 1000
Indian Wells	A	A	2R	2R	A	3R	QF	2R	1R	2R	2R	A	0 / 8	9–8	53%
Miami	A	A	2R	1R	A	2R	2R	1R	2R	4R	2R	A	0 / 8	5–8	38%
Monte-Carlo	A	Q2	QF	1R	1R	1R	3R	QF	1R	3R	1R	Q1	0 / 9	10–9	53%
Hamburg	A	A	1R	2R	2R	2R	2R	1R	2R	A	1R	A	0 / 8	5–8	38%
Rome	A	A	2R	A	2R	A	1R	1R	1R	1R	2R	A	0 / 7	3–7	30%
Canada	A	A	1R	A	1R	A	1R	1R	2R	1R	A	A	0 / 6	1–6	14%
Cincinnati	A	A	A	2R	1R	1R	2R	2R	2R	2R	2R	A	0 / 8	6–8	43%
Paris	A	A	Q1	1R	Q1	3R	A	QF	3R	2R	A	A	0 / 5	6–5	55%
Madrid	Not Held								2R	2R	1R	A	0 / 3	0–3	0%
Stuttgart	A	A	Q2	1R	1R	3R	QF	2R	A	A	A	A	0 / 5	5–5	50%
Win–loss	0–0	0–0	6–6	3–7	2–6	8–7	10–8	9–9	4–9	6–8	2–7	0–0	0 / 67	50–67	43%

=== Doubles ===
Tournament	1995	1996	1997	1998	1999	2000	2001	2002	2003	SR	W–L	Win %
Grand Slam tournaments
Australian Open	A	A	1R	A	A	A	A	3R	2R	0 / 3	3–3	50%
French Open	A	2R	1R	A	A	A	2R	1R	1R	0 / 5	2–5	29%
Wimbledon	A	2R	A	A	2R	A	QF	3R	A	0 / 4	7–4	100%
US Open	Q2	QF	1R	A	1R	A	SF	2R	A	0 / 5	8–5	62%
Win–loss	0–0	5–3	0–3	0–0	1–2	0–0	8–3	5–4	1–2	0 / 17	20–17	54%
ATP Tour Masters 1000
Indian Wells	A	A	1R	A	Q1	Q2	1R	QF	1R	0 / 4	2–4	33%
Miami	A	2R	QF	A	A	A	2R	3R	1R	0 / 5	6–5	55%
Monte-Carlo	A	QF	1R	A	Q2	A	2R	1R	1R	0 / 5	0–5	38%
Hamburg	A	2R	1R	A	Q2	A	Q1	2R	A	0 / 3	2–3	40%
Rome	A	2R	A	A	A	A	A	1R	1R	0 / 3	1–3	25%
Canada	A	1R	A	A	A	A	SF	2R	A	0 / 3	4–3	57%
Cincinnati	A	A	A	A	A	A	1R	1R	1R	0 / 3	0–3	0%
Paris	A	Q1	A	A	A	A	2R	1R	A	0 / 2	1–2	33%
Madrid	Not Held							1R	A	0 / 1	0–1	0%
Stuttgart	A	A	A	A	QF	A	2R	A	A	0 / 2	3–2	60%
Win–loss	0–0	5–5	3–4	0–0	2–1	0–0	7–7	5–9	0–5	0 / 31	22–31	42%
