= Sébastien Lareau =

Canadian tennis player (born 1973)

- Country (sports): Canada
- Residence: Canada
- Born: April 27, 1973 (age 53) Montreal, Quebec
- Height: 1.82 m (6 ft 0 in)
- Turned pro: 1991
- Retired: 2001
- Plays: Right-handed
- Prize money: $2,879,682

Singles
- Career record: 99–137
- Career titles: 0
- Highest ranking: No. 76 (April 17, 1995)

Grand Slam singles results
- Australian Open: 3R (1998)
- French Open: 2R (1997)
- Wimbledon: 2R (1993, 1998, 1999, 2000)
- US Open: 2R (1995, 1998, 1999)

Other tournaments
- Olympic Games: 2R (2000)

Doubles
- Career record: 266–142
- Career titles: 16
- Highest ranking: No. 4 (October 11, 1999)

Grand Slam doubles results
- Australian Open: F (1996, 1997)
- French Open: QF (2000)
- Wimbledon: SF (1998)
- US Open: W (1999)

Other doubles tournaments
- Tour Finals: W (1999)
- Olympic Games: W (2000)

Olympic medal record

Men's tennis

Representing Canada
Gold medal – first place	2000 Sydney	Men's doubles

Sébastien Lareau (French pronunciation: [sebastjɛ̃ laʁo]; born April 27, 1973) is a former professional tennis player. He became the first Canadian to win a Grand Slam title by winning the 1999 US Open men's doubles with his American partner Alex O'Brien. He also won his nation's first Olympic tennis medal by claiming gold in men's doubles at the 2000 Sydney Games with Daniel Nestor.

== As a singles player ==
The right-handed Lareau achieved a career best singles ranking of world No. 76 in April 1995. He has a career ATP Tour event win–loss record of 99–137. Lareau's best singles tour results were:

- in 1995, the quarterfinals of the Philadelphia and St. Petersburg World Series events;
- in 1996, the fourth round of the Key Biscayne Super 9 event;
- in 1997, the quarterfinals of the Hong Kong World Series event;
- in 1998, the third round of the Australian Open; the semifinals of the Philadelphia, the quarterfinals of the Scottsdale, the semifinals of the Hong Kong, the quarterfinals of the Washington and Moscow World Series events;
- in 1999, the quarterfinals of the Tokyo Outdoor World Series event; and
- in 2001, the semifinals of the Memphis International Series Gold event.

== As a doubles player ==
Lareau reached a career-high doubles ranking of world No. 4 in October 1999. He won 16 doubles titles on the ATP Tour. Lareau won one major title, the 1999 US Open, and the season-ending 1999 ATP Doubles Championships, both partnering Alex O'Brien. The pair were also finalists at the 1996 Australian Open and 1997 Australian Open.

Representing Canada, playing alongside Daniel Nestor, Lareau won the gold medal in men's doubles at the 2000 Sydney Olympics, defeating Australia's defending champions Todd Woodbridge and Mark Woodforde in the final.

== Grand Slam finals ==
=== Doubles: 3 (1 title, 2 runner-ups) ===
Result	Year	Championship	Surface	Partner	Opponents	Score
Loss	1996	Australian Open	Hard	(United States) Alex O'Brien	(Sweden) Stefan Edberg (Czech Republic) Petr Korda	5–7, 5–7, 6–4, 1–6
Loss	1997	Australian Open	Hard	(United States) Alex O'Brien	(Australia) Todd Woodbridge (Australia) Mark Woodforde	6–4, 5–7, 5–7, 3–6
Win	1999	U.S. Open	Hard	(United States) Alex O'Brien	(India) Mahesh Bhupathi (India) Leander Paes	7–6^{(9–7)}, 6–4

== Olympic finals ==
=== Doubles: 1 (1 gold medal) ===
Result	Year	Location	Surface	Partner	Opponents	Score
Gold	2000	Sydney	Hard	(Canada) Daniel Nestor	(Australia) Todd Woodbridge (Australia) Mark Woodforde	5–7, 6–3, 6–4, 7–6

== ATP career finals ==
=== Doubles: 31 (16 titles / 15 runner-ups) ===
Legend Grand Slam (1–2) Tennis Masters Cup (1–1) ATP Masters Series (4–1) ATP Championship Series (4–5) ATP Tour (6–6)	Finals by surface Hard (11–9) Clay (0–1) Grass (1–2) Carpet (4–3)

Result	W-L	Date	Tournament	Surface	Partner	Opponents	Score
Loss	0–1	Apr 1994	Tokyo Outdoor, Japan	Hard	(United States) Patrick McEnroe	(Sweden) Henrik Holm (Sweden) Anders Järryd	6–7, 1–6
Loss	0–2	Apr 1994	Seoul, South Korea	Hard	(United States) Kent Kinnear	(France) Stéphane Simian (United States) Kenny Thorne	4–6, 6–3, 5–7
Loss	0–3	Nov 1994	Antwerp, Belgium	Carpet	(Netherlands) Hendrik Jan Davids	(Sweden) Jan Apell (Sweden) Jonas Björkman	6–4, 1–6, 2–6
Win	1–3	May 1995	Seoul, South Korea	Hard	(United States) Jeff Tarango	(Australia) Joshua Eagle (Australia) Andrew Florent	6–3, 6–2
Win	2–3	Oct 1995	Beijing, China	Carpet (i)	(United States) Tommy Ho	(Belgium) Dick Norman (Netherlands) Fernon Wibier	7–6, 7–6
Loss	2–4	Jan 1996	Australian Open, Melbourne	Hard	(United States) Alex O'Brien	(Sweden) Stefan Edberg (Czech Republic) Petr Korda	5–7, 5–7, 6–4, 1–6
Loss	2–5	Jun 1996	Queen's Club, England	Grass	(United States) Alex O'Brien	(Australia) Mark Woodforde (Australia) Todd Woodbridge	3–6, 6–7
Loss	2–6	Apr 1996	Doubles Championships, Hartford	Carpet (i)	(United States) Alex O’Brien	(Australia) Mark Woodforde (Australia) Todd Woodbridge	4–6, 7–5, 2–6, 6–7^{(3–7)}
Win	3–6	Oct 1996	Stuttgart Indoor, Germany	Carpet (i)	(United States) Alex O'Brien	(Netherlands) Jacco Eltingh (Netherlands) Paul Haarhuis	3–6, 6–4, 6–3
Loss	3–7	Jan 1997	Australian Open, Melbourne	Hard	(United States) Alex O'Brien	(Australia) Mark Woodforde (Australia) Todd Woodbridge	6–4, 5–7, 5–7, 3–6
Win	4–7	Mar 1997	Philadelphia, United States	Hard (i)	(United States) Alex O'Brien	(South Africa) Ellis Ferreira (United States) Patrick Galbraith	6–3, 6–3
Win	5–7	Jul 1997	Los Angeles, United States	Hard	(United States) Alex O'Brien	(India) Mahesh Bhupathi (United States) Rick Leach	7–6, 6–4
Loss	5–8	Aug 1997	Montreal, Canada	Hard	(United States) Alex O’Brien	(India) Mahesh Bhupathi (India) Leander Paes	6–7, 3–6
Loss	5–9	Aug 1997	New Haven, United States	Hard	(United States) Alex O'Brien	(India) Mahesh Bhupathi (India) Leander Paes	4–6, 7–6, 2–6
Win	6–9	Apr 1998	Tokyo, Japan	Hard	(Canada) Daniel Nestor	(France) Olivier Delaître (Italy) Stefano Pescosolido	6–4, 4–6, 6–4
Loss	6–10	Jun 1998	Nottingham, England	Grass	(Canada) Daniel Nestor	(United States) Justin Gimelstob (South Africa) Byron Talbot	5–7, 7–6, 4–6
Loss	6–11	Aug 1998	New Haven, United States	Hard	(United States) Alex O'Brien	(Australia) Wayne Arthurs (Australia) Peter Tramacchi	6–7, 6–1, 3–6
Win	7–11	Nov 1998	Stuttgart Indoor, Germany	Hard (i)	(United States) Alex O'Brien	(India) Mahesh Bhupathi (India) Leander Paes	6–3, 3–6, 7–5
Win	8–11	Jan 1999	Sydney, Australia	Hard	(Canada) Daniel Nestor	(United States) Patrick Galbraith (Netherlands) Paul Haarhuis	6–3, 6–4
Loss	8–12	Feb 1999	Memphis, United States	Hard (i)	(United States) Alex O’Brien	(Australia) Todd Woodbridge (Australia) Mark Woodforde	3–6, 4–6
Win	9–12	Jun 1999	Queen's Club, England	Grass	(United States) Alex O'Brien	(Australia) Todd Woodbridge (Australia) Mark Woodforde	6–3, 7–6
Win	10–12	Aug 1999	Washington, D.C., United States	Hard	(United States) Justin Gimelstob	(South Africa) David Adams (South Africa) John-Laffnie de Jager	7–5, 6–7, 6–3
Win	11–12	Sep 1999	US Open, New York	Hard	(United States) Alex O'Brien	(India) Mahesh Bhupathi (India) Leander Paes	7–6^{(9–7)}, 6–4
Win	12–12	Oct 1999	Shanghai, China	Hard	(Canada) Daniel Nestor	(Australia) Todd Woodbridge (Australia) Mark Woodforde	7–5, 6–3
Win	13–12	Nov 1999	Paris, France	Carpet (i)	(United States) Alex O'Brien	(United States) Jared Palmer (Netherlands) Paul Haarhuis	7–6, 7–5
Win	14–12	Nov 1999	Doubles Championships, Hartford	Carpet (i)	(United States) Alex O'Brien	(India) Mahesh Bhupathi (India) Leander Paes	6–3, 6–2, 6–2
Win	15–12	Feb 2000	Memphis, United States	Hard (i)	(United States) Justin Gimelstob	(United States) Jim Grabb (United States) Richey Reneberg	6–2, 6–4
Loss	15–13	Mar 2000	Copenhagen, Denmark	Carpet (i)	(Sweden) Jonas Björkman	(Czech Republic) Martin Damm (Germany) David Prinosil	1–6, 7–5, 5–7
Loss	15–14	May 2000	Orlando, United States	Clay	(United States) Justin Gimelstob	(India) Leander Paes (Netherlands) Jan Siemerink	3–6, 4–6
Win	16–14	Aug 2000	Toronto, Canada	Hard	(Canada) Daniel Nestor	(Australia) Joshua Eagle (Australia) Andrew Florent	6–3, 7–6^{(7–3)}
Loss	16–15	Aug 2001	Indianapolis, United States	Hard	(India) Mahesh Bhupathi	(The Bahamas) Mark Knowles (United States) Brian MacPhie	6–7, 7–5, 4–6

== Doubles performance timeline ==
Key
W	F	SF	QF	#R	RR	Q#	DNQ	A	NH

(W) winner; (F) finalist; (SF) semifinalist; (QF) quarterfinalist; (#R) rounds 4, 3, 2, 1; (RR) round-robin stage; (Q#) qualification round; (DNQ) did not qualify; (A) absent; (NH) not held; (SR) strike rate (events won / competed); (W–L) win–loss record.

Tournament	1989	1990	1991	1992	1993	1994	1995	1996	1997	1998	1999	2000	2001	2002	Career SR	Career win–loss
Grand Slam tournaments
Australian Open	A	A	A	A	A	QF	2R	F	F	1R	1R	1R	3R	A	0 / 8	16–8
French Open	A	A	A	A	A	A	3R	3R	2R	3R	1R	QF	A	A	0 / 6	10–6
Wimbledon	A	A	A	A	Q2	3R	2R	3R	1R	SF	QF	QF	1R	A	0 / 8	15–8
U.S. Open	A	A	A	A	SF	2R	1R	QF	2R	1R	W	QF	2R	A	1 / 9	18–8
Grand Slam SR	0 / 0	0 / 0	0 / 0	0 / 0	0 / 1	0 / 3	0 / 4	0 / 4	0 / 4	0 / 4	1 / 4	0 / 4	0 / 3	0 / 0	1 / 31	N/A
Annual win–loss	0–0	0–0	0–0	0–0	4–1	6–3	4–4	12–4	7–4	6–4	9–3	9–4	3–3	0–0	N/A	59–30
Masters Series
Indian Wells	NME	A	A	A	A	QF	A	A	QF	1R	1R	3R	A	A	0 / 5	5–5
Miami	NME	A	A	A	A	1R	A	QF	3R	2R	2R	QF	2R	A	0 / 7	6–7
Monte Carlo	NME	A	A	A	A	A	A	A	A	A	A	A	A	A	0 / 0	0–0
Rome	NME	A	A	A	A	A	A	A	A	A	A	A	A	A	0 / 0	0–0
Hamburg	NME	A	A	A	A	A	A	A	A	A	A	A	A	A	0 / 0	0–0
Canada	NME	A	QF	1R	QF	1R	1R	QF	F	QF	2R	W	1R	A	1 / 11	17–10
Cincinnati	NME	A	A	A	2R	2R	2R	2R	SF	QF	2R	SF	1R	A	0 / 9	12–9
Stuttgart	NME	A	A	A	A	1R	A	W	SF	W	QF	2R	A	A	2 / 6	12–4
Paris	NME	A	A	A	A	A	A	2R	A	2R	W	A	A	A	1 / 3	5–2
Masters Series SR	N/A	0 / 0	0 / 1	0 / 1	0 / 2	0 / 5	0 / 2	1 / 5	0 / 5	1 / 6	1 / 6	1 / 5	0 / 3	0 / 0	4 / 41	N/A
Annual win–loss	N/A	0–0	2–1	0–1	3–2	3–5	1–2	9–4	10–5	11–5	7–5	10–3	1–4	0–0	N/A	57–37
Year-end ranking	659	861	287	332	67	42	55	17	15	17	4	17	118	1536	N/A	
