= 2000 Copenhagen Open =

- Date: 26 February – 5 March
- Edition: 12th
- Category: World Series
- Draw: 32S / 16D
- Prize money: $325,000
- Surface: Hard / indoor
- Location: Copenhagen, Denmark
- Venue: K.B. Hallen

Champions

Singles
- (Sweden) Andreas Vinciguerra

Doubles
- (Czech Republic) Martin Damm / (Germany) David Prinosil
← 1999 ·	Copenhagen Open	· 2001 →

The 2000 Copenhagen Open was a men's tennis tournament played on indoor hard courts at the K.B. Hallen in Copenhagen, Denmark and was part of the World Series of the 2000 ATP Tour. It was the 12th edition of the tournament and took place from 26 February until 5 March 2000. Unseeded Andreas Vinciguerra won the singles title.

== Finals ==
=== Singles ===
(Sweden) Andreas Vinciguerra defeated (Sweden) Magnus Larsson 6–3, 7–6^{(7–5)}

- It was Vinciguerra's 1st title of the year and the 1st of his career.

=== Doubles ===
(Czech Republic) Martin Damm / (Germany) David Prinosil defeated (Sweden) Jonas Björkman / (Canada) Sébastien Lareau 6–1, 5–7, 7–5

- It was Damm's 1st title of the year and the 16th of his career. It was Prinosil's 1st title of the year and the 7th of his career.
