= 2001 Copenhagen Open – Doubles =

Doubles
- 2001 Copenhagen Open

Final
- Champions: (Zimbabwe) Wayne Black (Zimbabwe) Kevin Ullyett
- Runners-up: (Czech Republic) Jiří Novák (Czech Republic) David Rikl
- Score: 6–3, 6–3

Events
Singles	Doubles
← 2000 ·	Copenhagen Open	· 2002 →

Martin Damm and David Prinosil were the defending champions but did not compete that year.

Wayne Black and Kevin Ullyett won in the final 6–3, 6–3 against Jiří Novák and David Rikl.

== Seeds ==
1. (Czech Republic) Jiří Novák / (Czech Republic) David Rikl (final)
2. (Australia) Joshua Eagle / (Australia) Sandon Stolle (semifinals)
3. (Zimbabwe) Wayne Black / (Zimbabwe) Kevin Ullyett (champions)
4. (Czech Republic) Petr Pála / (Czech Republic) Pavel Vízner (first round)

== Draw ==
=== Key ===
- Q = Qualifier
- WC = Wild card
- LL = Lucky loser
- Alt = Alternate
- SE = Special exempt
- PR = Protected ranking
- ITF = ITF entry
- JE = Junior exempt
- w/o = Walkover
- r = Retired
- d = Defaulted
- SR = Special ranking

First round
1	(Czech Republic) J Novák (Czech Republic) D Rikl	6	6
Q	(Israel) N Behr (United States) M Russell	0	4
(United States) D Bowen (Israel) J Erlich	7^{7}	5	4
WC	(Sweden) M Gustafsson (Sweden) A Vinciguerra	6^{5}	7	6
4	(Czech Republic) P Pála (Czech Republic) P Vízner	6	5	2
(United States) P Goldstein (United States) J Thomas	2	7	6
(Switzerland) I Heuberger (North Macedonia) A Kitinov	7	4	4
(Netherlands) S Groen (Netherlands) J Siemerink	5	6	6
(Czech Republic) C Suk (United States) J Waite	2	4
(Sweden) J Landsberg (South Africa) M Wakefield	6	6
WC	(Germany) L Burgsmüller (Australia) A Ilie	2	2
3	(Zimbabwe) W Black (Zimbabwe) K Ullyett	6	6
(Germany) K Braasch (Germany) J Knippschild	6^{5}	6	7^{8}
(Italy) A Gaudenzi (Czech Republic) D Škoch	7^{7}	1	6^{6}
WC	(Denmark) K Pless (Germany) R Schüttler	3	3
2	(Australia) J Eagle (Australia) S Stolle	6	6

Quarterfinals
1	(Czech Republic) J Novák (Czech Republic) D Rikl	w/o
WC	(Sweden) M Gustafsson (Sweden) A Vinciguerra
(United States) P Goldstein (United States) J Thomas	4	6	6^{2}
(Netherlands) S Groen (Netherlands) J Siemerink	6	3	7^{7}
(Sweden) J Landsberg (South Africa) M Wakefield	4	0
3	(Zimbabwe) W Black (Zimbabwe) K Ullyett	6	6
(Germany) K Braasch (Germany) J Knippschild	6^{6}	6^{4}
2	(Australia) J Eagle (Australia) S Stolle	7^{8}	7^{7}

Semifinals
1	(Czech Republic) J Novák (Czech Republic) D Rikl	6	6
(Netherlands) S Groen (Netherlands) J Siemerink	2	3
3	(Zimbabwe) W Black (Zimbabwe) K Ullyett	6	6
2	(Australia) J Eagle (Australia) S Stolle	4	4

Final
1	(Czech Republic) J Novák (Czech Republic) D Rikl	3	3
3	(Zimbabwe) W Black (Zimbabwe) K Ullyett	6	6
