= 2001 Copenhagen Open =

- Date: 12–18 February
- Edition: 13th
- Category: International Series
- Draw: 32S / 16D
- Prize money: $325,000
- Location: Copenhagen, Denmark
- Venue: K.B. Hallen

Champions

Singles
- (United Kingdom) Tim Henman

Doubles
- (Zimbabwe) Wayne Black / (Zimbabwe) Kevin Ullyett
← 2000 ·	Copenhagen Open	· 2002 →

The 2001 Copenhagen Open was a men's tennis tournament played on indoor hard courts at the K.B. Hallen in Copenhagen in Denmark and was part of the International Series of the 2001 ATP Tour. It was the 13th edition of the tournament and was held from 12 February through 18 February 2001. First-seeded Tim Henman won the singles title.

== Finals ==
=== Singles ===
(United Kingdom) Tim Henman defeated (Sweden) Andreas Vinciguerra 6–3, 6–4

- It was Henman's 1st singles title of the year and the 7th of his career.

=== Doubles ===
(Zimbabwe) Wayne Black / (Zimbabwe) Kevin Ullyett defeated (Czech Republic) Jiří Novák / (Czech Republic) David Rikl 6–3, 6–3

- It was Black's 2nd title of the year and the 6th of his career. It was Ullyett's 1st title of the year and the 11th of his career.
