= 2000 Copenhagen Open – Doubles =

Doubles
- 2000 Copenhagen Open

Final
- Champions: (Czech Republic) Martin Damm (Germany) David Prinosil
- Runners-up: (Sweden) Jonas Björkman (Canada) Sébastien Lareau
- Score: 6–1, 5–7, 7–5

Details
- Draw: 16 (3WC/1Q)
- Seeds: 4

Events
| Singles | Doubles |
| ← 1999 · | Copenhagen Open | · 2001 → |

Max Mirnyi and Andrei Olhovskiy were the defending champions, but none competed this year. Mirnyi played in Delray Beach at the same week

Martin Damm and David Prinosil won the title by defeating Jonas Björkman and Sébastien Lareau 6–1, 5–7, 7–5 in the final.

== Seeds ==
A champion seed is indicated in bold text while text in italics indicates the round in which that seed was eliminated.

1. (Sweden) Jonas Björkman / (Canada) Sébastien Lareau (final)
2. **(Czech Republic) Martin Damm / (Germany) David Prinosil (champions)**
3. (South Africa) Marius Barnard / (South Africa) Chris Haggard (first round)
4. (Portugal) Nuno Marques / (Belgium) Tom Vanhoudt (semifinals)

== Draw ==
=== Key ===
- Q = Qualifier
- WC = Wild card
- LL = Lucky loser
- Alt = Alternate
- ITF = ITF entry
- PR = Protected ranking
- SR = Special ranking
- SE = Special exempt
- JE = Junior exempt
- JR = Junior Accelerator Programme entrant
- CO = College Accelerator Programme entrant
- NG = Next Gen Accelerator Program entrant
- w/o = Walkover
- r = Retired
- d = Defaulted

=== Draw ===
First round
1 | **(Sweden) J Björkman** **(Canada) S Lareau** | 3 | **6** | **6**
WC | (Croatia) G Ivanišević (Croatia) I Ljubičić | **6** | 3 | 4
(Australia) W Arthurs (Switzerland) R Federer | **6** | 2 | 6^{5}
**(Netherlands) J Siemerink** **(Sweden) M Tillström** | 4 | **6** | **7^{7}**
3 | (South Africa) M Barnard (South Africa) C Haggard | **7^{7}** | 4 | 6^{8}
**(Japan) T Shimada** **(South Africa) M Wakefield** | 6^{1} | **6** | **7^{10}**
WC | **(Sweden) T Johansson** **(Sweden) M Larsson** | **6** | **6**
WC | (Denmark) K Pless (Sweden) A Vinciguerra | 4 | 4
**(Czech Republic) P Pála** **(Czech Republic) P Vízner** | **6** | **6**
(Czech Republic) T Cibulec (Czech Republic) L Friedl | 1 | 1
(United States) D Bowen (United Kingdom) N Broad | **7** | 6^{2} | 2
4 | **(Portugal) N Marques** **(Belgium) T Vanhoudt** | 5 | **7^{7}** | **6**
**(Germany) M-K Goellner** **(Germany) M Kohlmann** | **7^{7}** | 3 | **6**
(Sweden) S Aspelin (Sweden) J Landsberg | 6^{5} | **6** | 2
Q | (Germany) K Braasch (Germany) D Dier | 2 | 4
2 | **(Czech Republic) M Damm** **(Germany) D Prinosil** | **6** | **6**

Quarterfinals
1 | **(Sweden) J Björkman** **(Canada) S Lareau** | 4 | **6** | **7^{7}**
(Netherlands) J Siemerink (Sweden) M Tillström | **6** | 3 | 6^{3}
**(Japan) T Shimada** **(South Africa) M Wakefield** | 6^{1} | **6** | **7**
WC | (Sweden) T Johansson (Sweden) M Larsson | **7^{7}** | 4 | 5
(Czech Republic) P Pála (Czech Republic) P Vízner | 2 | **6** | 1
4 | **(Portugal) N Marques** **(Belgium) T Vanhoudt** | **6** | 4 | **6**
(Germany) M-K Goellner (Germany) M Kohlmann | 4 | 3
2 | **(Czech Republic) M Damm** **(Germany) D Prinosil** | **6** | **6**

Semifinals
1 | **(Sweden) J Björkman** **(Canada) S Lareau** | **6** | **6**
(Japan) T Shimada (South Africa) M Wakefield | 2 | 3
4 | (Portugal) N Marques (Belgium) T Vanhoudt | 2 | 1
2 | **(Czech Republic) M Damm** **(Germany) D Prinosil** | **6** | **6**

Final
1 | (Sweden) J Björkman (Canada) S Lareau | 1 | **7** | 5
2 | **(Czech Republic) M Damm** **(Germany) D Prinosil** | **6** | 5 | **7**

== Qualifying ==
=== Qualifying seeds ===
1. (South Africa) Paul Rosner / (South Africa) Jason Weir-Smith (qualifying competition)
2. (United States) Geoff Grant / (United States) Mark Keil (first round)

=== Qualifiers ===
1. **(Germany) Karsten Braasch / (Germany) Dirk Dier**

=== Qualifying draw ===
First round
1 | **(South Africa) Paul Rosner** **(South Africa) Jason Weir-Smith** | 3 | **6** | **6**
WC | (Denmark) Bob Borella (Denmark) Mads Gottlieb | **6** | 3 | 4
**(Germany) Karsten Braasch** **(Germany) Dirk Dier** | **6** | **6**
2 | (United States) Geoff Grant (United States) Mark Keil | 2 | 4

Qualifying competition
1 | (South Africa) Paul Rosner (South Africa) Jason Weir-Smith | **6** | 2 | 4
**(Germany) Karsten Braasch** **(Germany) Dirk Dier** | 4 | **6** | **6**
