= 1999 Copenhagen Open – Singles =

Singles
- 1999 Copenhagen Open

Final
- Champion: (Sweden) Magnus Gustafsson
- Runner-up: (France) Fabrice Santoro
- Score: 6–4, 6–1

Details
- Draw: 32
- Seeds: 8

Events
Singles	Doubles
← 1998 ·	Copenhagen Open	· 2000 →

The 1999 Croatian Indoors was a men's tennis tournament played on indoor carpet courts in Copenhagen, Denmark, that was part of the International Series of the 1999 ATP Tour. It was the twelfth edition of the tournament and was held from 2 February until 9 February 1998.

== Seeds ==
Champion seeds are indicated in bold text while text in italics indicates the round in which those seeds were eliminated.

1. (Switzerland) Marc Rosset (second round)
2. (Zimbabwe) Byron Black (semifinals)
3. (Sweden) **Magnus Gustafsson (champion)**
4. (France) Fabrice Santoro (final)
5. Unknown (withdrew)
6. (Italy) Davide Sanguinetti (second round)
7. (Germany) David Prinosil (first round)
8. (Italy) Gianluca Pozzi (second round)

== Draw ==
=== Key ===
- Q = Qualifier
- WC = Wild card
- LL = Lucky loser
- Alt = Alternate
- SE = Special exempt
- PR = Protected ranking
- ITF = ITF entry
- JE = Junior exempt
- w/o = Walkover
- r = Retired
- d = Defaulted
- SR = Special ranking

=== Finals ===
Semifinals
(France) Sébastien Grosjean	**6**	2	0
4	**(France) Fabrice Santoro**	1	**6**	**6**
3	**(Sweden) Magnus Gustafsson**	**6**	**6**
2	(Zimbabwe) Byron Black	3	1

Final
4	(France) Fabrice Santoro	4	1
3	**(Sweden) Magnus Gustafsson**	**6**	**6**

=== Top half ===
First round
1	**(Switzerland) M Rosset**	2	**6**	**6**
(Argentina) G Cañas	**6**	3	3
**(Canada) D Nestor**	**6**	**6**
(Romania) A Voinea	3	2
**(France) S Grosjean**	**7**	4	**6**
(Germany) M-K Goellner	6^{5}	**6**	3
**(Denmark) F Fetterlein**	**6**	**6**
7	(Germany) D Prinosil	1	4
4	**(France) F Santoro**	**6**	**6**
(Denmark) T Larsen	3	0
**(Austria) S Koubek**	**7**	**6**
(France) A Clément	5	2
**(Germany) R Schüttler**	4	**6**	**6**
(Italy) L Tieleman	**6**	4	2
**(Germany) B Karbacher**	**6**	**6**
(Slovakia) J Krošlák	3	4

Second round
1	(Switzerland) M Rosset	6^{6}	4
**(Canada) D Nestor**	**7**	**6**
**(France) S Grosjean**	**6**	**7**
(Denmark) F Fetterlein	2	5
4	**(France) F Santoro**	**6**	**6**
(Austria) S Koubek	1	2
**(Germany) R Schüttler**	**6**	**7**
(Germany) B Karbacher	3	6^{4}

Quarterfinals
(Canada) D Nestor	**6**	5	4
**(France) S Grosjean**	4	**7**	**6**
4	**(France) F Santoro**	**6**	2
(Germany) R Schüttler	3	0^{r}

Semifinals
(France) S Grosjean	**6**	2	0
4	**(France) F Santoro**	1	**6**	**6**

=== Bottom half ===
First round
6	**(Italy) D Sanguinetti**	**6**	6^{6}	**6**
(Sweden) J Landsberg	2	**7**	1
**(Zimbabwe) W Black**	5	**6**	**6**
(Finland) T Ketola	**7**	3	0
**(South Africa) N Godwin**	**6**	**6**
(Netherlands) P Wessels	2	3
3	**(Sweden) M Gustafsson**	**7**	**7**
(Denmark) K Carlsen	5	5
8	**(Italy) G Pozzi**	4	**7**	**6**
(Sweden) M Tillström	**6**	5	2
**(Belarus) M Mirnyi**	**7**	**7**
(Germany) M Kohlmann	6^{5}	6
**(Sweden) N Kulti**	**6**	**6**
(Sweden) A Vinciguerra	1	3
2	**(Zimbabwe) B Black**	**6**	**6**
(Denmark) K Pless	2	3

Second round
6	(Italy) D Sanguinetti	6^{1}	3
**(Zimbabwe) W Black**	**7**	**6**
(South Africa) N Godwin	3	**7**	5
3	**(Sweden) M Gustafsson**	**6**	6^{5}	**7**
8	(Italy) G Pozzi	5	**6**	6^{3}
**(Belarus) M Mirnyi**	**7**	4	**7**
(Sweden) N Kulti	6^{5}	**6**	3
2	**(Zimbabwe) B Black**	**7**	3	**6**

Quarterfinals
(Zimbabwe) W Black	4	**6**	2
3	**(Sweden) M Gustafsson**	**6**	4	**6**
(Belarus) M Mirnyi	**7**	3	3
2	**(Zimbabwe) B Black**	6^{5}	**6**	**6**

Semifinals
3	**(Sweden) M Gustafsson**	**6**	**6**
2	(Zimbabwe) B Black	3	1
