= 1998 Copenhagen Open – Singles =

Singles
- 1998 Copenhagen Open

Final
- Champion: (Sweden) Magnus Gustafsson
- Runner-up: (Germany) David Prinosil
- Score: 3–6, 6–1, 6–1

Details
- Draw: 32
- Seeds: 8

Events
Singles	Doubles
← 1997 ·	Copenhagen Open	· 1999 →

The 1998 Copenhagen Open was a men's tennis tournament played on indoor carpet courts in Copenhagen, Denmark that was part of the International Series of the 1998 ATP Tour. It was the eleventh edition of the tournament and was held from 9 March through 15 March 1998.

== Seeds ==
Champion seeds are indicated in bold text while text in italics indicates the round in which those seeds were eliminated.

1. (Sweden) Thomas Johansson (second round)
2. (Sweden) **Magnus Gustafsson (champion)**
3. (Morocco) Hicham Arazi (second round)
4. (Netherlands) Jan Siemerink (semifinals)
5. (Belgium) Filip Dewulf (second round)
6. (New Zealand) Brett Steven (quarterfinals)
7. (Germany) Marc-Kevin Goellner (first round)
8. (Czech Republic) Martin Damm (first round)

== Draw ==
=== Key ===
- Q = Qualifier
- WC = Wild card
- LL = Lucky loser
- Alt = Alternate
- SE = Special exempt
- PR = Protected ranking
- ITF = ITF entry
- JE = Junior exempt
- w/o = Walkover
- r = Retired
- d = Defaulted
- SR = Special ranking

=== Finals ===
Semifinals
**(Germany) David Prinosil**	**6**	**7**
4	(Netherlands) Jan Siemerink	3	6^{5}
(Denmark) Kenneth Carlsen	4	**7**	2
2	**(Sweden) Magnus Gustafsson**	**6**	5	**6**

Final
(Germany) David Prinosil	**6**	1	1
2	**(Sweden) Magnus Gustafsson**	3	**6**	**6**

=== Top half ===
First round
1	**(Sweden) T Johansson**	**6**	**6**
(Netherlands) D van Scheppingen	2	2
**(Germany) D Prinosil**	**7**	**6**
(Germany) C Vinck	5	3
**(France) O Delaître**	**7**	4	**6**
(Denmark) F Fetterlein	6^{6}	**6**	3
**(Germany) M Sinner**	4	**7**	**6**
8	(Czech Republic) M Damm	**6**	6^{5}	4
4	**(Netherlands) J Siemerink**	**6**	**6**
(France) A Clément	1	3
**(Italy) D Nargiso**	**7**	**6**
(Sweden) M Tillström	5	4
**(Italy) D Sanguinetti**	**7**	**7**
(Belgium) J Van Herck	6^{4}	5
6	**(New Zealand) B Steven**	**6**	**6**
(Germany) J Knippschild	4	0

Second round
1	(Sweden) T Johansson	**6**	4	**6**
**(Germany) D Prinosil**	3	**6**	4
**(France) O Delaître**	0	**6**	**6**
(Germany) M Sinner	**6**	0	2
4	**(Netherlands) J Siemerink**	**6**	4	**6**
(Italy) D Nargiso	4	**6**	3
(Italy) D Sanguinetti	3	1
6	**(New Zealand) B Steven**	**6**	**6**

Quarterfinals
**(Germany) D Prinosil**	**6**	**6**
(France) O Delaître	3	3
4	**(Netherlands) J Siemerink**	**6**	**6**
6	(New Zealand) B Steven	3	3

Semifinals
**(Germany) D Prinosil**	**6**	**7**
4	(Netherlands) J Siemerink	3	6^{5}

=== Bottom half ===
First round
5	**(Belgium) F Dewulf**	**6**	**6**
(Sweden) N Kulti	4	4
**(Denmark) K Carlsen**	**6**	**6**
(Spain) J Díaz	1	1
**(Italy) G Pozzi**	**6**	**6**
(France) A Boetsch	4	3
3	**(Morocco) H Arazi**	**6**	**6**
(Czech Republic) R Vašek	3	3
**(Romania) A Pavel**	3	**6**	**7**
7	(Germany) M-K Goellner	**6**	3	6^{4}
**(Finland) T Ketola**	**7**	2	**6**
(Germany) R Schüttler	5	**6**	3
**(Italy) R Furlan**	**6**	3	**6**
(Denmark) J Printzlau	3	**6**	3
2	**(Sweden) M Gustafsson**	**6**	**7**
(Slovakia) J Krošlák	1	6^{2}

Second round
5	(Belgium) F Dewulf	4	6^{4}
**(Denmark) K Carlsen**	**6**	**7**
**(Italy) G Pozzi**	**7**	**6**
3	(Morocco) H Arazi	5	2
**(Romania) A Pavel**	6^{4}	**6**	**6**
(Finland) T Ketola	**7**	2	1
(Italy) R Furlan	2	2
2	**(Sweden) M Gustafsson**	**6**	**6**

Quarterfinals
**(Denmark) K Carlsen**	**6**	3	**6**
(Italy) G Pozzi	3	**6**	1
(Romania) A Pavel	3	**6**	3
2	**(Sweden) M Gustafsson**	**6**	4	**6**

Semifinals
(Denmark) K Carlsen	4	**7**	2
2	**(Sweden) M Gustafsson**	**6**	5	**6**
