= 2002 Copenhagen Open – Singles =

Singles
- 2002 Copenhagen Open

Final
- Champion: (Germany) Lars Burgsmüller
- Runner-up: (Belgium) Olivier Rochus
- Score: 6–3, 6–3

Details
- Draw: 32
- Seeds: 8

Events
Singles	Doubles
← 2001 ·	Copenhagen Open	· 2003 →

Tim Henman was the defending champion but did not compete that year.

Lars Burgsmüller won in the final 6–3, 6–3 against Olivier Rochus.

== Seeds ==
A champion seed is indicated in bold text while text in italics indicates the round in which that seed was eliminated.

1. (Czech Republic) Jiří Novák (quarterfinals)
2. (Germany) Rainer Schüttler (quarterfinals)
3. (Germany) Nicolas Kiefer (first round)
4. (Italy) Davide Sanguinetti (semifinals)
5. (Russia) Mikhail Youzhny (first round)
6. (Finland) Jarkko Nieminen (first round)
7. (Romania) Adrian Voinea (first round)
8. (Belgium) Christophe Rochus (quarterfinals)

== Draw ==
=== Key ===
- Q = Qualifier
- WC = Wild card
- LL = Lucky loser
- Alt = Alternate
- ITF = ITF entry
- PR = Protected ranking
- SR = Special ranking
- SE = Special exempt
- JE = Junior exempt
- JR = Junior Accelerator Programme entrant
- CO = College Accelerator Programme entrant
- NG = Next Gen Accelerator Program entrant
- w/o = Walkover
- r = Retired
- d = Defaulted

First round
1	(Czech Republic) **J Novák**	**6**	**7**
Q	(Italy) S Galvani	2	5
(Belarus) **V Voltchkov**	**7^{7}**	**7^{7}**
(Spain) Á Calatrava	6^{4}	6^{2}
Q	(Germany) D Gremelmayr	3	3
(Georgia (country)) **I Labadze**	**6**	**6**
WC	(Sweden) **M Larsson**	4	**6**	**6**
5	(Russia) M Youzhny	**6**	3	4
3	(Germany) N Kiefer	3	**6**	4
Q	(South Africa) **N Godwin**	**6**	3	**6**
(Germany) **L Burgsmüller**	**6**	**6**
(Czech Republic) O Fukárek	1	2
(United States) **C Mamiit**	**6**	**6**
(France) A Dupuis	0	3
(Czech Republic) **M Tabara**	4	**7^{12}**	**6**
7	(Romania) A Voinea	**6**	6^{10}	0
8	(Belgium) **C Rochus**	**6**	**1**
(France) M Llodra	3	2	r
(United Kingdom) M Lee	5	3
Q	(Czech Republic) **R Štěpánek**	**7**	**6**
WC	(Denmark) **K Carlsen**	**6**	**6**
(Australia) W Arthurs	4	4
(Spain) J Balcells	**7^{7}**	1	2
4	(Italy) **D Sanguinetti**	6^{1}	**6**	**6**
6	(Finland) J Nieminen	**6**	3	1
(Belgium) **O Rochus**	2	**6**	**6**
(Germany) **A Pretzsch**	6^{5}	**6**	**6**
WC	(United States) M Chang	**7^{7}**	1	3
(Switzerland) **I Heuberger**	**6**	**6**
(Germany) M Kohlmann	2	4
(Switzerland) G Bastl	6^{1}	3
2	(Germany) **R Schüttler**	**7^{7}**	**6**

Second round
1	(Czech Republic) **J Novák**	**6**	**6**
(Belarus) V Voltchkov	4	0
(Georgia (country)) I Labadze	1	6^{2}
WC	(Sweden) **M Larsson**	**6**	**7^{7}**
Q	(South Africa) N Godwin	**7^{7}**	0	3
(Germany) **L Burgsmüller**	6^{3}	**6**	**6**
(United States) **C Mamiit**	**7^{8}**	**6**
(Czech Republic) M Tabara	6^{6}	2
(Belgium) **C Rochus**	4	**7**	**7^{7}**
Q	(Czech Republic) R Štěpánek	**6**	5	6^{4}
WC	(Denmark) K Carlsen	4	**7^{7}**	6^{9}
4	(Italy) **D Sanguinetti**	**6**	6^{5}	**7^{11}**
(Belgium) **O Rochus**	**6**	**6**
(Germany) A Pretzsch	2	0
(Switzerland) I Heuberger	6^{3}	4
2	(Germany) **R Schüttler**	**7^{7}**	**6**

Quarterfinals
1	(Czech Republic) J Novák	3	2
WC	(Sweden) **M Larsson**	**6**	**6**
(Germany) **L Burgsmüller**	**6**	**6**
(United States) C Mamiit	3	0
8	(Belgium) C Rochus	2	6^{2}
4	(Italy) **D Sanguinetti**	**6**	**7^{7}**
(Belgium) **O Rochus**	**6**	2	**7**
2	(Germany) R Schüttler	4	**6**	5

Semifinals
WC	(Sweden) M Larsson	4	**7**	6^{2}
(Germany) **L Burgsmüller**	**6**	5	**7^{7}**
4	(Italy) D Sanguinetti	**6**	0	4
(Belgium) **O Rochus**	2	**6**	**6**

Final
(Germany) **Lars Burgsmüller**	**6**	**6**
(Belgium) Olivier Rochus	3	3
