= 1998 Copenhagen Open – Doubles =

Doubles
- 1998 Copenhagen Open

Final
- Champions: (Netherlands) Tom Kempers (Netherlands) Menno Oosting
- Runners-up: (Australia) Brett Steven (Netherlands) Jan Siemerink
- Score: 6–4, 7–6

Events
Singles	Doubles
← 1997 ·	Copenhagen Open	· 1999 →

The 1998 Copenhagen Open was a men's tennis tournament played on indoor carpet courts in Copenhagen, Denmark that was part of the International Series of the 1998 ATP Tour. It was the eleventh edition of the tournament and was held from 9 March through 15 March 1998.

== Seeds ==
Champion seeds are indicated in bold text while text in italics indicates the round in which those seeds were eliminated.

1. (North Macedonia) Aleksandar Kitinov / (Czech Republic) Pavel Vízner (first round)
2. (Sweden) Nicklas Kulti / (Sweden) Mikael Tillström (semifinals)
3. (Australia) Andrew Kratzmann / (Russia) Andrei Olhovskiy (first round)
4. (Netherlands) **Tom Kempers** / (Netherlands) **Menno Oosting (champion)**

== Draw ==
=== Key ===
- Q = Qualifier
- WC = Wild card
- LL = Lucky loser
- Alt = Alternate
- SE = Special exempt
- PR = Protected ranking
- ITF = ITF entry
- JE = Junior exempt
- w/o = Walkover
- r = Retired
- d = Defaulted
- SR = Special ranking

=== Finals ===
First round
(Australia) **W Arthurs** **(Australia) P Kilderry**	**6**	3	**6**
1	(North Macedonia) A Kitinov (Czech Republic) P Vízner	3	**6**	3
(Denmark) **K Carlsen** **(Denmark) F Fetterlein**	**7**	**7**
(United States) G Van Emburgh (Czech Republic) T Anzari	5	6
4	(Netherlands) **T Kempers** **(Netherlands) M Oosting**	6	**7**	**6**
(Netherlands) T Nijssen (Czechoslovakia) L Pimek	**7**	6	4
(Germany) **J Knippschild** **(Germany) D Prinosil**	4	**6**	**6**
(United States) B Coupe (South Africa) O Rosner	**6**	3	4
(Finland) **T Ketola** **(Australia) T Larkham**	**7**	**7**
(South Africa) M Barnard (South Africa) B Haygarth	6	6
(Netherlands) **J Siemerink** **(New Zealand) B Steven**	5	**6**	**6**
3	(Australia) A Kratzmann (Russia) A Olhovskiy	**7**	3	3
(Sweden) **M Gustafsson** **(Sweden) T Johansson**	**6**	**6**
(Italy) C Brandi (Italy) F Messori	2	3
2	(Sweden) **N Kulti** **(Sweden) M Tillström**	**6**	**6**
(Denmark) J Printzlau (Denmark) J Tribler	4	1

Quarterfinals
(Australia) **W Arthurs** **(Australia) P Kilderry**	**7**	**7**
(Denmark) K Carlsen (Denmark) F Fetterlein	6	6
4	(Netherlands) **T Kempers** **(Netherlands) M Oosting**	**7**	**6**
(Germany) J Knippschild (Germany) D Prinosil	6	1
(Finland) T Ketola (Australia) T Larkham	5	**6**	3
(Netherlands) **J Siemerink** **(New Zealand) B Steven**	**7**	4	**6**
(Sweden) M Gustafsson (Sweden) J Johansson	6	2
2	(Sweden) **N Kulti** **(Sweden) M Tillström**	**7**	**6**

Semifinals
(Australia) W Arthurs (Australia) P Kilderry	4	1
4	(Netherlands) **T Kempers** **(Netherlands) M Oosting**	**6**	**6**
(Netherlands) **J Siemerink** **(New Zealand) B Steven**	**6**	**7**
2	(Sweden) N Kulti (Sweden) M Tillström	3	6

Final
4	(Netherlands) **T Kempers** **(Netherlands) M Oosting**	**6**	**7**
(Netherlands) J Siemerink (New Zealand) B Steven	4	6
