= 1997 Copenhagen Open – Singles =

Singles
- 1997 Copenhagen Open

Final
- Champion: (Sweden) Thomas Johansson
- Runner-up: (Czech Republic) Martin Damm
- Score: 6–4, 3–6, 6–2

Details
- Draw: 32
- Seeds: 8

Events
Singles	Doubles
← 1996 ·	Copenhagen Open	· 1998 →

Cédric Pioline was the defending champion but did not compete that year.

Thomas Johansson won in the final 6–4, 3–6, 6–2 against Martin Damm.

== Seeds ==
A champion seed is indicated in bold text while text in italics indicates the round in which that seed was eliminated.

1. n/a
2. (Czech Republic) Martin Damm (final)
3. (Germany) David Prinosil (second round)
4. (Germany) Alex Rădulescu (first round)
5. (Sweden) **Thomas Johansson (champion)**
6. (Slovakia) Karol Kučera (semifinals)
7. (Denmark) Kenneth Carlsen (second round)
8. (Czech Republic) Daniel Vacek (first round)

== Draw ==
=== Key ===
- Q = Qualifier
- WC = Wild card
- LL = Lucky loser
- Alt = Alternate
- ITF = ITF entry
- PR = Protected ranking
- SR = Special ranking
- SE = Special exempt
- JE = Junior exempt
- JR = Junior Accelerator Programme entrant
- CO = College Accelerator Programme entrant
- NG = Next Gen Accelerator Program entrant
- w/o = Walkover
- r = Retired
- d = Defaulted

First round
LL	(France) G Solvès	4	5
Q	(South Africa) **K Ullyett**	**6**	**7**
(France) S Simian	3	2
Q	(Germany) **L Burgsmüller**	**6**	**6**
(Spain) **T Carbonell**	**6**	**6**
Q	(Israel) E Erlich	2	2
WC	(Denmark) T Larsen	1	3
7	(Denmark) **K Carlsen**	**6**	**6**
4	(Germany) A Rădulescu	**6**	5	3
(Slovakia) **J Krošlák**	3	**7**	**6**
(Australia) R Fromberg	4	4
(Sweden) **M Norman**	**6**	**6**
(Russia) **A Volkov**	**6**	**7^{7}**
(Russia) A Olhovskiy	4	6^{4}
(Belgium) J van Herck	4	5
5	(Sweden) **T Johansson**	**6**	**7**
6	(Slovakia) **K Kučera**	**6**	**6**
(Bulgaria) O Stanoytchev	3	0
(Sweden) P Fredriksson	1	3
(France) **F Santoro**	**6**	**6**
(France) **G Raoux**	**6**	**7**
Q	(New Zealand) B Steven	4	5
(France) T Champion	6^{6}	6^{11}
3	(Germany) **D Prinosil**	**7^{8}**	**7^{13}**
8	(Czech Republic) D Vacek	2	**7^{7}**	2
WC	(Denmark) **F Fetterlein**	**6**	6^{3}	**6**
(Spain) E Benfele Álvarez	1	1
(Belgium) **F Dewulf**	**6**	**6**
(Portugal) **N Marques**	**6**	6^{7}	**6**
(Italy) R Furlan	3	**7^{9}**	1
WC	(Denmark) P Langvardt	2	3
2	(Czech Republic) **M Damm**	**6**	**6**

Second round
Q	(South Africa) K Ullyett	**6**	3	4
Q	(Germany) **L Burgsmüller**	3	**6**	**6**
(Spain) **T Carbonell**	**7^{7}**	**7^{9}**
7	(Denmark) K Carlsen	6^{5}	6^{7}
(Slovakia) **J Krošlák**	4	**6**	**6**
(Sweden) M Norman	**6**	4	2
(Russia) A Volkov	**6**	3	2
5	(Sweden) **T Johansson**	4	**6**	**6**
6	(Slovakia) **K Kučera**	**6**	4	**6**
(France) F Santoro	1	**6**	1
(France) **G Raoux**	**7^{8}**	**6**
3	(Germany) D Prinosil	6^{6}	4
WC	(Denmark) **F Fetterlein**	**6**	**7^{7}**
(Belgium) F Dewulf	3	6^{1}
(Portugal) N Marques	3	**6**	3
2	(Czech Republic) **M Damm**	**6**	3	**6**

Quarterfinals
Q	(Germany) **L Burgsmüller**	**6**	**6**
(Spain) T Carbonell	4	4
(Slovakia) J Krošlák	**6**	3	2
5	(Sweden) **T Johansson**	4	**6**	**6**
6	(Slovakia) **K Kučera**	**6**	**6**
(France) G Raoux	4	2
WC	(Denmark) F Fetterlein	4	3
2	(Czech Republic) **M Damm**	**6**	**6**

Semifinals
Q	(Germany) L Burgsmüller	2	4
5	(Sweden) **T Johansson**	**6**	**6**
6	(Slovakia) K Kučera	4	**6**	3
2	(Czech Republic) **M Damm**	**6**	3	**6**

Final
5	(Sweden) **T Johansson**	**6**	3	**6**
2	(Czech Republic) Martin Damm	4	**6**	2
