= 1999 Copenhagen Open =

- Date: 2–9 March
- Edition: 11th
- Category: International Series
- Surface: Carpet / Indoor
- Location: Copenhagen, Denmark

Champions

Singles
- (Sweden) Magnus Gustafsson

Doubles
- (Belarus) Max Mirnyi / (Russia) Andrei Olhovskiy
← 1998 ·	Copenhagen Open	· 2000 →

The 1999 Copenhagen Open was a men's tennis tournament played on carpet courts in Copenhagen, Denmark, that was part of the International Series of the 1999 ATP Tour. It was the twelfth edition of the tournament and was held 2–9 March 1999.

== Finals ==
=== Singles ===
(Sweden) Magnus Gustafsson defeated (France) Fabrice Santoro, 6–4, 6–1

=== Doubles ===
(Belarus) Max Mirnyi / (Russia) Andrei Olhovskiy defeated (Germany) Marc-Kevin Goellner / (Germany) David Prinosil, 6–7^{(5–7)}, 7–6^{(7–4)}, 6–1
