= 1999 Copenhagen Open – Doubles =

Doubles
- 1999 Copenhagen Open

Final
- Champions: (Belarus) Max Mirnyi (Russia) Andrei Olhovskiy
- Runners-up: (Germany) Marc-Kevin Goellner (Germany) David Prinosil
- Score: 6–7^{(5–7)}, 7–6^{(7–4)}, 6–1

Events
| Singles | Doubles |
| ← 1998 · | Copenhagen Open | · 2000 → |

The 1999 Croatian Indoors was a men's tennis tournament played on carpet courts in Copenhagen, Denmark, that was part of the International Series of the 1999 ATP Tour. It was the twelfth edition of the tournament and was held from 2 February until 9 February 1998.

== Seeds ==
Champion seeds are indicated in bold text while text in italics indicates the round in which those seeds were eliminated.

1. (Australia) Wayne Arthurs / (France) Fabrice Santoro (quarterfinals)
2. (Sweden) Nicklas Kulti / (Sweden) Mikael Tillström (first round)
3. (Belarus) **Max Mirnyi** / (Russia) **Andrei Olhovskiy (champions)**
4. (Germany) Marc-Kevin Goellner / (Germany) David Prinosil (final)

== Draw ==
=== Key ===
- Q = Qualifier
- WC = Wild card
- LL = Lucky loser
- Alt = Alternate
- SE = Special exempt
- PR = Protected ranking
- ITF = ITF entry
- JE = Junior exempt
- w/o = Walkover
- r = Retired
- d = Defaulted
- SR = Special ranking

=== Finals ===
First round
1 | (Australia) **W Arthurs** **(France) F Santoro** | **6** | 1 | **6**
(Netherlands) S Noteboom (Netherlands) P Wessels | 3 | **6** | 3
(South Africa) **M Barnard** **(South Africa) B Haygarth** | **6** | **7**
(Australia) G Silcock (South Africa) M Wakefield | 1 | 6
4 | (Germany) **M-K Goellner** **(Germany) D Prinosil** | **7** | **6**
(Sweden) T Hildebrand (Sweden) J Landsberg | 6 | 2
(Italy) **M Bertolini** **(Italy) C Brandi** | **6** | **6**
(Denmark) K Pless (Denmark) J Tribler | 2 | 3
(Sweden) **J Apell** **(Sweden) M Gustafsson** | **7** | 6 | **6**
(Netherlands) S Groen (Netherlands) F Wibier | 6 | **7** | 3
3 | (Belarus) **M Mirnyi** **(Russia) A Olhovskiy** | **6** | 3 | **6**
(Finland) T Ketola (South Africa) P Rosner | 3 | **6** | 3
(Germany) **M Kohlmann** **(Switzerland) F Veglio** | **6** | 5 | **6**
(Denmark) K Carlsen (Denmark) F Fetterlein | 2 | **7** | 4
(South Africa) **N Godwin** **(United States) M Keil** | **6** | **7**
2 | (Sweden) N Kulti (Sweden) M Tillström | 2 | 6

Quarterfinals
1 | (Australia) W Arthurs (France) F Santoro | 5 | **6** | 5
(South Africa) **M Barnard** **(South Africa) B Haygarth** | **7** | 3 | **7**
4 | (Germany) **M-K Goellner** **(Germany) D Prinosil** | **7** | **7**
(Italy) M Bertolini (Italy) C Brandi | 5 | 6
(Sweden) J Apell (Sweden) M Gustafsson | **6** | 3 | 2
3 | (Belarus) **M Mirnyi** **(Russia) A Olhovskiy** | 4 | **6** | **6**
(Germany) **M Kohlmann** **(Switzerland) F Veglio** | 3 | **6** | **6**
(South Africa) N Godwin (United States) M Keil | **6** | 3 | 4

Semifinals
(South Africa) M Barnard (South Africa) B Haygarth | **7** | 4 | 3
4 | (Germany) **M-K Goellner** **(Germany) D Prinosil** | 6 | **6** | **6**
3 | (Belarus) **M Mirnyi** **(Russia) A Olhovskiy** | **6** | **7**
(Germany) M Kohlmann (Switzerland) F Veglio | 1 | 5

Final
4 | (Germany) M-K Goellner (Germany) D Prinosil | **7** | 6 | 1
3 | (Belarus) **M Mirnyi** **(Russia) A Olhovskiy** | 6 | **7** | **6**
