= 1997 Copenhagen Open =

- Date: 10–16 March
- Edition: 9th
- Category: World Series
- Surface: Carpet / indoor
- Location: Copenhagen, Denmark
- Venue: K.B. Hallen

Champions

Singles
- (Sweden) Thomas Johansson

Doubles
- (Russia) Andrei Olhovskiy / (New Zealand) Brett Steven
← 1996 ·	Copenhagen Open	· 1998 →

The 1997 Copenhagen Open was a men's tennis tournament played on indoor carpet courts at the K.B. Hallen in Copenhagen, Denmark and was part of the World Series of the 1997 ATP Tour. It was the ninth edition of the tournament and ran from 10 March until 16 March 1997. Thomas Johansson won the singles title.

== Finals ==
=== Singles ===
(Sweden) Thomas Johansson defeated (Czech Republic) Martin Damm, 6–4, 3–6, 6–2.

- It was Johansson's 1st title of the year and the 1st of his career.

=== Doubles ===
(Russia) Andrei Olhovskiy / (New Zealand) Brett Steven defeated (Denmark) Kenneth Carlsen / (Denmark) Frederik Fetterlein, 6–4, 6–2.

- It was Olhovskiy's 1st title of the year and the 18th of his career. It was Steven's 1st title of the year and the 6th of his career.
