= 2003 Copenhagen Open =

- Date: 24 February – 2 March
- Edition: 15th
- Category: International Series
- Draw: 32S / 16D
- Prize money: $355,000
- Location: Copenhagen, Denmark
- Venue: K.B. Hallen

Champions

Singles
- (Slovakia) Karol Kučera

Doubles
- (Czech Republic) Tomáš Cibulec / (Czech Republic) Pavel Vízner
← 2002 ·	Copenhagen Open

The 2003 Copenhagen Open was a men's tennis tournament played on indoor hard courts at the K.B. Hallen in Copenhagen in Denmark and was part of the International Series of the 2003 ATP Tour. It was the 15th edition of the tournament and was held from 24 February until 2 March 2003. Third-seeded Karol Kučera won the singles title.

== Finals ==
=== Singles ===
(Slovakia) Karol Kučera defeated (Belgium) Olivier Rochus, 7–6^{(7–4)}, 6–4.

- It was Kučera's only singles title of the year and the 6th and last of his career.

=== Doubles ===
(Czech Republic) Tomáš Cibulec / (Czech Republic) Pavel Vízner defeated (Austria) Julian Knowle / (Germany) Michael Kohlmann, 7–5, 5–7, 6–2.

- It was Cibulec's 1st title of the year and the 2nd of his career. It was Vízner's 1st title of the year and the 4th of his career.
