= 1996 Copenhagen Open – Singles =

Singles
- 1996 Copenhagen Open

Final
- Champion: (France) Cédric Pioline
- Runner-up: (Denmark) Kenneth Carlsen
- Score: 6–2, 7–6^{(9–7)}

Details
- Draw: 32
- Seeds: 8

Events
Singles	Doubles
← 1995 ·	Copenhagen Open	· 1997 →

Martin Sinner was the defending singles champion but lost in the quarterfinals to Tim Henman.

Cédric Pioline won in the final 6–2, 7–6^{(9–7)} against Kenneth Carlsen.

== Seeds ==
A champion seed is indicated in bold text while text in italics indicates the round in which that seed was eliminated.

1. (Netherlands) Jan Siemerink (second round)
2. (Czech Republic) Bohdan Ulihrach (first round)
3. (France) **Cédric Pioline (champion)**
4. (Belgium) Filip Dewulf (quarterfinals)
5. (Sweden) Mikael Tillström (quarterfinals)
6. (France) Guillaume Raoux (second round)
7. (Denmark) Kenneth Carlsen (final)
8. (Germany) Marc-Kevin Goellner (second round)

== Draw ==
=== Key ===
- Q = Qualifier
- WC = Wild card
- LL = Lucky loser
- Alt = Alternate
- SE = Special exempt
- PR = Protected ranking
- ITF = ITF entry
- JE = Junior exempt
- w/o = Walkover
- r = Retired
- d = Defaulted
- SR = Special ranking

First round
1	(Netherlands) **J Siemerink**	**6**	6^{5}	**6**
Q	(Sweden) M Stadling	3	**7^{7}**	4
(France) L Roux	**6**	6^{5}	1
(Germany) **M Sinner**	4	**7^{7}**	**6**
(Sweden) H Holm	**6**	5	6^{5}
(United Kingdom) **T Henman**	4	**7**	**7^{7}**
WC	(Sweden) A Järryd	3	4
8	(Germany) **M-K Goellner**	**6**	**6**
3	(France) **C Pioline**	**7**	**6**
(United States) J Tarango	5	4
(Morocco) K Alami	4	4
(Germany) **C-U Steeb**	**6**	**6**
Q	(Denmark) T Andersen	6^{2}	2
(Czech Republic) **M Damm**	**7^{7}**	**6**
Q	(Russia) A Volkov	5	6^{2}
5	(Sweden) **M Tillström**	**7**	**7^{7}**
6	(France) **G Raoux**	**6**	**6**
WC	(Denmark) P Langvardt	1	2
(Uzbekistan) O Ogorodov	4	4
(Belgium) **J van Herck**	**6**	**6**
(France) J Golmard	2	4
(Hungary) **S Noszály**	**6**	**6**
(Denmark) F Fetterlein	3	4
4	(Belgium) **F Dewulf**	**6**	**6**
7	(Denmark) **K Carlsen**	**6**	**6**
(Portugal) N Marques	3	1
WC	(Denmark) M Christensen	2	4
Q	(Italy) **O Camporese**	**6**	**6**
(Sweden) T Johansson	3	4
(Sweden) **J Apell**	**6**	**6**
(Sweden) **M Gustafsson**	**6**	**6**
2	(Czech Republic) B Ulihrach	2	4

Second round
1	(Netherlands) J Siemerink	4	**7^{7}**	6^{3}
(Germany) **M Sinner**	**6**	6^{3}	**7^{7}**
(United Kingdom) **T Henman**	**6**	**6**
8	(Germany) M-K Goellner	3	3
3	(France) **C Pioline**	**6**	**6**
(Germany) C-U Steeb	3	2
(Czech Republic) M Damm	6^{6}	6^{7}
5	(Sweden) **M Tillström**	**7^{8}**	**7^{9}**
6	(France) G Raoux	2	**6**	6^{1}
(Belgium) **J van Herck**	**6**	3	**7^{7}**
(Hungary) S Noszály	3	3
4	(Belgium) **F Dewulf**	**6**	**6**
7	(Denmark) **K Carlsen**	**6**	6^{3}	**6**
Q	(Italy) O Camporese	4	**7^{7}**	4
(Sweden) J Apell	3	6^{4}
(Sweden) **M Gustafsson**	**6**	**7^{7}**

Quarterfinals
(Germany) M Sinner	5	1
(United Kingdom) **T Henman**	**7**	**6**
3	(France) **C Pioline**	**6**	**7^{9}**
5	(Sweden) M Tillström	3	6^{7}
(Belgium) **J van Herck**	**6**	**7**
4	(Belgium) F Dewulf	3	5
7	(Denmark) **K Carlsen**	**6**	4	**7^{7}**
(Sweden) M Gustafsson	3	**6**	6^{3}

Semifinals
(United Kingdom) T Henman	3	**6**	1
3	(France) **C Pioline**	**6**	3	**6**
(Belgium) J van Herck	6^{5}	3
7	(Denmark) **K Carlsen**	**7^{7}**	**6**

Final
3	(France) **Cédric Pioline**	**6**	**7^{9}**
7	(Denmark) Kenneth Carlsen	2	6^{7}
