= 1997 Copenhagen Open – Doubles =

Doubles
- 1997 Copenhagen Open

Final
- Champions: (Russia) Andrei Olhovskiy (New Zealand) Brett Steven
- Runners-up: (Denmark) Kenneth Carlsen (Denmark) Frederik Fetterlein
- Score: 6–4, 6–2

Events
Singles	Doubles
← 1996 ·	Copenhagen Open	· 1998 →

Libor Pimek and Byron Talbot were the defending champions but only Pimek competed that year with Menno Oosting.

Oosting and Pimek lost in the semifinals to Andrei Olhovskiy and Brett Steven.

Olhovskiy and Steven won in the final 6–4, 6–2 against Kenneth Carlsen and Frederik Fetterlein.

== Seeds ==
1. (Netherlands) Menno Oosting / (Belgium) Libor Pimek (semifinals)
2. (Spain) Tomás Carbonell / (Spain) Francisco Roig (quarterfinals)
3. (South Africa) David Adams / (South Africa) Marius Barnard (first round)
4. (Argentina) Pablo Albano / (Sweden) Peter Nyborg (first round)

== Draw ==
=== Key ===
- Q = Qualifier
- WC = Wild card
- LL = Lucky loser
- Alt = Alternate
- ITF = ITF entry
- PR = Protected ranking
- SR = Special ranking
- SE = Special exempt
- JE = Junior exempt
- JR = Junior Accelerator Programme entrant
- CO = College Accelerator Programme entrant
- NG = Next Gen Accelerator Program entrant
- w/o = Walkover
- r = Retired
- d = Defaulted

First round
1	(Netherlands) M Oosting (Belgium) L Pimek	7	6
(Italy) C Brandi (Italy) F Messori	5	3
Q	(Canada) S Leblanc (United States) G Van Emburgh	1	2
(Hungary) G Köves (Portugal) N Marques	6	6
3	(South Africa) D Adams (South Africa) M Barnard	6	6	4
(Belarus) M Mirnyi (South Africa) K Ullyett	7	3	6
(Russia) A Olhovskiy (New Zealand) B Steven	7	7
(Netherlands) T Kempers (Netherlands) T Nijssen	5	6
(Netherlands) S Groen (Germany) D Prinosil	6	6
WC	(Denmark) T Andersen (Denmark) P Langvardt	3	0
WC	(Denmark) K Carlsen (Denmark) F Fetterlein	7	6	6
4	(Argentina) P Albano (Sweden) P Nyborg	6	7	2
(Netherlands) S Noteboom (Netherlands) F Wibier	2	6	3
(France) G Raoux (France) F Santoro	6	3	6
WC	(Sweden) P Fredriksson (Sweden) M Norman	1	4
2	(Spain) T Carbonell (Spain) F Roig	6	6

Quarterfinals
1	(Netherlands) M Oosting (Belgium) L Pimek	7	7
(Hungary) G Köves (Portugal) N Marques	5	6
(Belarus) M Mirnyi (South Africa) K Ullyett	6	5	1
(Russia) A Olhovskiy (New Zealand) B Steven	2	7	6
(Netherlands) S Groen (Germany) D Prinosil	4	6	3
WC	(Denmark) K Carlsen (Denmark) F Fetterlein	6	4	6
(France) G Raoux (France) F Santoro	6	7
2	(Spain) T Carbonell (Spain) F Roig	3	6

Semifinals
1	(Netherlands) M Oosting (Belgium) L Pimek	6	2
(Russia) A Olhovskiy (New Zealand) B Steven	7	6
WC	(Denmark) K Carlsen (Denmark) F Fetterlein	7	6
(France) G Raoux (France) F Santoro	5	4

Final
(Russia) A Olhovskiy (New Zealand) B Steven	6	6
WC	(Denmark) K Carlsen (Denmark) F Fetterlein	4	2
