= 2002 Copenhagen Open – Doubles =

Doubles
- 2002 Copenhagen Open

Final
- Champions: (Austria) Julian Knowle (Germany) Michael Kohlmann
- Runners-up: (Czech Republic) Jiří Novák (Czech Republic) Radek Štěpánek
- Score: 7–6^{(10–8)}, 7–5

Events
Singles	Doubles
← 2001 ·	Copenhagen Open	· 2003 →

Wayne Black and Kevin Ullyett were the defending champions but did not compete that year.

Julian Knowle and Michael Kohlmann won in the final against Jiří Novák and Radek Štěpánek.

== Seeds ==
1. (Australia) Joshua Eagle / (Australia) Sandon Stolle (quarterfinals)
2. (Czech Republic) Petr Pála / (Czech Republic) Pavel Vízner (first round)
3. (Czech Republic) Jiří Novák / (Czech Republic) Radek Štěpánek (final)
4. (Australia) Andrew Florent / (Australia) David Macpherson (first round)

== Draw ==
=== Key ===
- Q = Qualifier
- WC = Wild card
- LL = Lucky loser
- Alt = Alternate
- ITF = ITF entry
- PR = Protected ranking
- SR = Special ranking
- SE = Special exempt
- JE = Junior exempt
- JR = Junior Accelerator Programme entrant
- CO = College Accelerator Programme entrant
- NG = Next Gen Accelerator Program entrant
- w/o = Walkover
- r = Retired
- d = Defaulted

First round
1	(Australia) J Eagle (Australia) S Stolle	6	6
(North Macedonia) A Kitinov (Sweden) J Landsberg	3	4
(Sweden) S Aspelin (Australia) A Kratzmann	7	6
(Georgia (country)) I Labadze (Italy) D Sanguinetti	5	1
4	(Australia) A Florent (Australia) D Macpherson	0	5
(Austria) J Knowle (Germany) M Kohlmann	6	7
(Czech Republic) F Čermák (Czech Republic) P Luxa	6	6
(South Africa) M Barnard (Czech Republic) C Suk	1	2
WC	(Germany) N Kiefer (Sweden) P Nyborg	3	4
(Germany) R Schüttler (Russia) M Youzhny	6	6
ALT	(Spain) Á Calatrava (United States) C Mamiit	4	5
3	(Czech Republic) J Novák (Czech Republic) R Štěpánek	6	7
WC	(Germany) L Burgsmüller (Finland) J Nieminen	3	7^{7}	[3]
WC	(South Africa) N Godwin (Belarus) V Voltchkov	6	6^{5}	[10]
(Czech Republic) T Cibulec (Czech Republic) O Fukárek	6	6
2	(Czech Republic) P Pála (Czech Republic) P Vízner	3	3

Quarterfinals
1	(Australia) J Eagle (Australia) S Stolle	3	4
(Sweden) S Aspelin (Australia) A Kratzmann	6	6
(Austria) J Knowle (Germany) M Kohlmann	6	6
(Czech Republic) F Čermák (Czech Republic) P Luxa	0	0
(Germany) R Schüttler (Russia) M Youzhny	2	4
3	(Czech Republic) J Novák (Czech Republic) R Štěpánek	6	6
WC	(South Africa) N Godwin (Belarus) V Voltchkov	6	7
(Czech Republic) T Cibulec (Czech Republic) O Fukárek	2	5

Semifinals
(Sweden) S Aspelin (Australia) A Kratzmann	1	4
(Austria) J Knowle (Germany) M Kohlmann	6	6
3	(Czech Republic) J Novák (Czech Republic) R Štěpánek	6	3	[10]
WC	(South Africa) N Godwin (Belarus) V Voltchkov	4	6	[3]

Final
(Austria) J Knowle (Germany) M Kohlmann	7^{10}	7
3	(Czech Republic) J Novák (Czech Republic) R Štěpánek	6^{8}	5
