= 2002 Copenhagen Open =

- Date: 11–17 February
- Edition: 14th
- Category: International Series
- Draw: 32S / 16D
- Prize money: $356,000
- Location: Copenhagen, Denmark
- Venue: K.B. Hallen

Champions

Singles
- (Germany) Lars Burgsmüller

Doubles
- (Austria) Julian Knowle / (Germany) Michael Kohlmann
← 2001 ·	Copenhagen Open	· 2003 →

The 2002 Copenhagen Open was a men's tennis tournament played on indoor hard courts at the K.B. Hallen in Copenhagen, Denmark and was part of the International Series of the 2002 ATP Tour. It was the 14th edition of the tournament and was held from 11 February until 17 February 2002. Unseeded Lars Burgsmüller won the singles title.

== Finals ==
=== Singles ===
(Germany) Lars Burgsmüller defeated (Belgium) Olivier Rochus 6–3, 6–3

- It was Burgsmüller's only singles title of his career.

=== Doubles ===
(Austria) Julian Knowle / (Germany) Michael Kohlmann defeated (Czech Republic) Jiří Novák / (Czech Republic) Radek Štěpánek 7–6^{(10–8)}, 7–5

- It was Knowle's 1st title of the year and the 1st of his career. It was Kohlmann's only title of the year and the 1st of his career.
