= 2003 Copenhagen Open – Singles =

Singles
- 2003 Copenhagen Open

Final
- Champion: (Slovakia) Karol Kučera
- Runner-up: (Belgium) Olivier Rochus
- Score: 7–6^{(7–4)}, 6–4

Details
- Draw: 32
- Seeds: 8

Events
Singles	Doubles
- Copenhagen Open

Lars Burgsmüller was the defending champion but lost in the second round to Olivier Rochus.

Karol Kučera won in the final 7–6^{(7–4)}, 6–4 against Rochus.

== Seeds ==
A champion seed is indicated in bold text while text in italics indicates the round in which that seed was eliminated.

1. (Finland) Jarkko Nieminen (first round)
2. (Australia) Wayne Arthurs (semifinals)
3. (Slovakia) **Karol Kučera (champion)**
4. (Czech Republic) Radek Štěpánek (semifinals)
5. (Denmark) Kenneth Carlsen (first round)
6. (Netherlands) Martin Verkerk (first round)
7. (Croatia) Mario Ančić (first round)
8. (Netherlands) Raemon Sluiter (first round)

== Draw ==
Key

- Q = Qualifier
- WC = Wild card
- LL = Lucky loser
- Alt = Alternate
- ITF = ITF entry
- PR = Protected ranking
- SR = Special ranking
- SE = Special exempt
- JE = Junior exempt
- JR = Junior Accelerator Programme entrant
- CO = College Accelerator Programme entrant
- NG = Next Gen Accelerator Program entrant
- w/o = Walkover
- r = Retired
- d = Defaulted

First round
1	(Finland) J Nieminen	3	2
(Belgium) **O Rochus**	**6**	**6**
(Austria) J Melzer	4	4
(Germany) **L Burgsmüller**	**6**	**6**
(Czech Republic) **J Vaněk**	**6**	2	**6**
WC	(Denmark) R Nørby	4	**6**	3
Q	(Germany) **T Behrend**	**6**	6^{7}	**7^{7}**
7	(Croatia) M Ančić	4	**7^{9}**	6^{2}
4	(Czech Republic) **R Štěpánek**	**7^{7}**	3	**6**
(France) A di Pasquale	6^{3}	**6**	3
WC	(Denmark) F Nielsen	1	1
Q	(Sweden) **M Larsson**	**6**	**6**
(United States) J Gimelstob	4	3
(Slovakia) **K Beck**	**6**	**6**
(France) **A Dupuis**	**6**	**6**
6	(Netherlands) M Verkerk	4	4
5	(Denmark) K Carlsen	**7^{7}**	3	4
(Switzerland) **M Kratochvil**	6^{3}	**6**	**6**
(Monaco) **J-R Lisnard**	**7**	**6**
Q	(Luxembourg) G Müller	5	4
Q	(Italy) M Dell'Acqua	6^{6}	6^{4}
(Switzerland) **M Rosset**	**7^{8}**	**7^{7}**
(Belgium) K Vliegen	2	3
3	(Slovakia) **K Kučera**	**6**	**6**
8	(Netherlands) R Sluiter	6^{4}	5
(Sweden) **M Norman**	**7^{7}**	**7**
(United States) C Mamiit	2	0
(Denmark) **K Pless**	**6**	**6**
(United States) B Vahaly	4	4
WC	(Sweden) **A Vinciguerra**	**6**	**6**
(France) O Mutis	6^{5}	2
2	(Australia) **W Arthurs**	**7^{7}**	**6**

Second round
(Belgium) **O Rochus**	**6**	**6**
(Germany) L Burgsmüller	1	2
(Czech Republic) J Vaněk	**7^{7}**	3	3
(Germany) **T Behrend**	6^{4}	**6**	**6**
4	(Czech Republic) **R Štěpánek**	**6**	1	**6**
Q	(Sweden) M Larsson	4	**6**	1
(Slovakia) **K Beck**	4	**7^{7}**	**1**
(France) A Dupuis	**6**	6^{5}	0/r
(Switzerland) **M Kratochvil**	**7^{7}**	**7^{8}**
(Monaco) J-R Lisnard	6^{5}	6^{6}
(Switzerland) M Rosset	6^{5}	3
3	(Slovakia) **K Kučera**	**7^{7}**	**6**
(Sweden) **M Norman**	**6**	**7^{8}**
(Denmark) K Pless	4	6^{6}
WC	(Sweden) A Vinciguerra	**7^{7}**	4	6^{6}
2	(Australia) **W Arthurs**	6^{4}	**6**	**7^{8}**

Quarterfinals
(Belgium) **O Rochus**	**6**	**6**
(Germany) T Behrend	4	1
4	(Czech Republic) **R Štěpánek**	**6**	1	**6**
(Slovakia) K Beck	4	**6**	2
(Switzerland) M Kratochvil	5	2
3	(Slovakia) **K Kučera**	**7**	**6**
(Sweden) M Norman	**7^{9}**	5	4
2	(Australia) **W Arthurs**	6^{7}	**7**	**6**

Semifinals
(Belgium) **O Rochus**	**6**	6^{2}	**6**
4	(Czech Republic) R Štěpánek	3	**7^{7}**	4
3	(Slovakia) **K Kučera**	**6**	**6**
2	(Australia) W Arthurs	2	4

Final
(Belgium) Olivier Rochus	6^{4}	4
3	(Slovakia) **Karol Kučera**	**7^{7}**	**6**
