= 1996 Copenhagen Open =

- Date: 11–17 March
- Edition: 8th
- Category: World Series
- Surface: Carpet / indoor
- Location: Copenhagen, Denmark
- Venue: K.B. Hallen

Champions

Singles
- (France) Cédric Pioline

Doubles
- (Belgium) Libor Pimek / (South Africa) Byron Talbot
← 1995 ·	Copenhagen Open	· 1997 →

The 1996 Copenhagen Open was a men's tennis tournament played on indoor carpet courts at the K.B. Hallen in Copenhagen, Denmark and was part of the World Series of the 1996 ATP Tour. It was the eighth edition of the tournament and was held from 11 March until 17 March 1996. Third-seeded Cédric Pioline won the singles title.

== Finals ==
=== Singles ===
(France) Cédric Pioline defeated (Denmark) Kenneth Carlsen 6–2, 7–6^{(9–7)}

- It was Pioline's 1st singles title of his career.

=== Doubles ===
(Belgium) Libor Pimek / (South Africa) Byron Talbot defeated (Australia) Wayne Arthurs / (Australia) Andrew Kratzmann 7–6, 3–6, 6–3

- It was Pimek's 2nd title of the year and the 15th of his career. It was Talbot's 1st title of the year and the 10th of his career.
