= 1996 Copenhagen Open – Doubles =

Doubles
- 1996 Copenhagen Open
- 1995 Champions: (United States) Mark Keil (Sweden) Peter Nyborg

Final
- Champions: (Belgium) Libor Pimek (South Africa) Byron Talbot
- Runners-up: (Australia) Wayne Arthurs (Australia) Andrew Kratzmann
- Score: 7–6, 3–6, 6–3

Events
Singles	Doubles
← 1995 ·	Copenhagen Open	· 1997 →

In the Doubles competition of the 1996 Copenhagen Open, Mark Keil and Peter Nyborg were the defending champions but they played with different partners that year(Keil with Jeff Tarango and Nyborg with Menno Oosting).

Keil and Tarango lost in the first round to Lorenzo Manta and Pavel Vízner.

Nyborg and Oosting lost in the quarterfinals to Wayne Arthurs and Andrew Kratzmann.

Libor Pimek and Byron Talbot won in the final 7–6, 3–6, 6–3 against Arthurs and Kratzmann.

== Seeds ==
1. (United States) Mark Keil / (United States) Jeff Tarango (first round)
2. (Sweden) Peter Nyborg / (Netherlands) Menno Oosting (quarterfinals)
3. (South Africa) David Adams / (Russia) Andrei Olhovskiy (quarterfinals)
4. (United Kingdom) Neil Broad / (South Africa) Piet Norval (quarterfinals)

== Draw ==
=== Key ===
- Q = Qualifier
- WC = Wild card
- LL = Lucky loser
- Alt = Alternate
- SE = Special exempt
- PR = Protected ranking
- ITF = ITF entry
- JE = Junior exempt
- w/o = Walkover
- r = Retired
- d = Defaulted
- SR = Special ranking

First round
1	(United States) M Keil (United States) J Tarango	6	4
(Switzerland) L Manta (Czech Republic) P Vízner	7	6
(Spain) J A Conde (Portugal) N Marques	6	6
(Belgium) L Pimek (South Africa) B Talbot	7	7
3	(South Africa) D Adams (Russia) A Olhovskiy	7	6
(South Africa) L Bale (South Africa) B Haygarth	5	3
WC	(Denmark) P Langvardt (Denmark) J Printzlau	0	4
(Netherlands) S Noteboom (Netherlands) F Wibier	6	6
(South Africa) M Barnard (Netherlands) T Kempers	6	6	7
(Australia) J Ireland (Belgium) D Norman	2	7	5
WC	(Denmark) M Christensen (Sweden) A Järryd	6	6	4
4	(United Kingdom) N Broad (South Africa) P Norval	3	7	6
WC	(Denmark) K Carlsen (Denmark) F Fetterlein	6	4
(Australia) W Arthurs (Australia) A Kratzmann	7	6
Q	(Germany) K Braasch (Belgium) F Dewulf	3	7	6
2	(Sweden) P Nyborg (Netherlands) M Oosting	6	6	7

Quarterfinals
(Switzerland) L Manta (Czech Republic) P Vízner	6	6
(Belgium) L Pimek (South Africa) B Talbot	7	7
3	(South Africa) D Adams (Russia) A Olhovskiy	3	4
(Netherlands) S Noteboom (Netherlands) F Wibier	6	6
(South Africa) M Barnard (Netherlands) T Kempers	6	3	6
4	(United Kingdom) N Broad (South Africa) P Norval	2	6	3
(Australia) W Arthurs (Australia) A Kratzmann	7	2	6
2	(Sweden) P Nyborg (Netherlands) M Oosting	6	6	2

Semifinals
(Belgium) L Pimek (South Africa) B Talbot	7	7
(Netherlands) S Noteboom (Netherlands) F Wibier	6	5
(South Africa) M Barnard (Netherlands) T Kempers	6	3
(Australia) W Arthurs (Australia) A Kratzmann	7	6

Final
(Belgium) L Pimek (South Africa) B Talbot	7	3	6
(Australia) W Arthurs (Australia) A Kratzmann	6	6	3
