= 2000 Copenhagen Open – Singles =

Singles
- 2000 Copenhagen Open

Final
- Champion: (Sweden) Andreas Vinciguerra
- Runner-up: (Sweden) Magnus Larsson
- Score: 6–3, 7–6^{(7–5)}

Details
- Draw: 32 (3WC/4Q)
- Seeds: 8

Events
Singles	Doubles
← 1999 ·	Copenhagen Open	· 2001 →

Magnus Gustafsson was the defending champion, but did not participate.

Andreas Vinciguerra won the title, defeating Magnus Larsson 6–3, 7–6^{(7–5)} in the final.

== Seeds ==
A champion seed is indicated in bold text while text in italics indicates the round in which that seed was eliminated.

1. (Russia) Marat Safin (semifinals)
2. (Sweden) Thomas Johansson (first round)
3. (Sweden) Magnus Larsson (final)
4. (Germany) Rainer Schüttler (second round)
5. (Croatia) Goran Ivanišević (second round)
6. (Sweden) Mikael Tillström (first round)
7. (Switzerland) Roger Federer (semifinals)
8. (Sweden) Jonas Björkman (quarterfinals)

== Draw ==
=== Key ===
- Q = Qualifier
- WC = Wild card
- LL = Lucky loser
- Alt = Alternate
- ITF = ITF entry
- PR = Protected ranking
- SR = Special ranking
- SE = Special exempt
- JE = Junior exempt
- JR = Junior Accelerator Programme entrant
- CO = College Accelerator Programme entrant
- NG = Next Gen Accelerator Program entrant
- w/o = Walkover
- r = Retired
- d = Defaulted

=== Finals ===
Semifinals
1/WC	(Russia) Marat Safin	3	0
**(Sweden) Andreas Vinciguerra**	**6**	**6**
3	**(Sweden) Magnus Larsson**	**6**	**7^{8}**
7	(Switzerland) Roger Federer	3	6^{6}

Final
**(Sweden) Andreas Vinciguerra**	**6**	**7^{7}**
3	(Sweden) Magnus Larsson	3	6^{5}

=== Top half ===
First round
1/WC	**(Russia) M Safin**	**6**	**7^{7}**
(Canada) S Lareau	4	6^{5}
**(Slovakia) J Krošlák**	**6**	**6**
(Romania) A Voinea	3	2
(United Kingdom) J Delgado	1	1
Q	**(Switzerland) I Heuberger**	**6**	**6**
(France) A Dupuis	2	5
8	**(Sweden) J Björkman**	**6**	**7**
4	**(Germany) R Schüttler**	**6**	**6**
(Switzerland) L Manta	1	2
**(Sweden) A Vinciguerra**	**6**	**6**
(Belgium) C Rochus	2	1
**(Czech Republic) M Damm**	**6**	3	**6**
WC	(Denmark) K Pless	4	**6**	3
**(Switzerland) G Bastl**	**6**	2	**6**
6	(Sweden) M Tillström	1	**6**	3

Second round
1/WC	**(Russia) M Safin**	3	**6**	**7^{10}**
(Slovakia) J Krošlák	**6**	0	6^{8}
Q	(Switzerland) I Heuberger	1	6^{5}
8	**(Sweden) J Björkman**	**6**	**7^{7}**
4	(Germany) R Schüttler	**6**	4	1
**(Sweden) A Vinciguerra**	3	**6**	**6**
**(Czech Republic) M Damm**	**7^{7}**	**7^{7}**
(Switzerland) G Bastl	6^{5}	6^{4}

Quarterfinals
1/WC	**(Russia) M Safin**	**6**	**6**
8	(Sweden) J Björkman	4	4
**(Sweden) A Vinciguerra**	**6**	**6**
(Czech Republic) M Damm	3	1

Semifinals
1/WC	(Russia) M Safin	3	0
**(Sweden) A Vinciguerra**	**6**	**6**

=== Bottom half ===
First round
5/WC	**(Croatia) G Ivanišević**	6^{4}	**6**	**6**
(Germany) D Prinosil	**7^{7}**	4	0
**(Croatia) I Ljubičić**	6^{6}	**6**	**6**
Q	(Czech Republic) P Luxa	**7^{8}**	1	3
(Switzerland) M Rosset	**6**	1	6^{4}
**(Germany) T Behrend**	0	**6**	**7^{7}**
(Australia) W Arthurs	6^{6}	**7^{7}**	2
3	**(Sweden) M Larsson**	**7^{8}**	6^{4}	**6**
7	**(Switzerland) R Federer**	**6**	4	**6**
Q	(Belgium) F Dewulf	4	**6**	3
(Germany) A Pretzsch	**6**	2	2
**(Sweden) F Jonsson**	2	**6**	**6**
**(Italy) G Pozzi**	2	**6**	**6**
(Netherlands) J Siemerink	**6**	4	4
Q	**(Finland) V Liukko**	3	**6**	**7**
2	(Sweden) T Johansson	**6**	4	5

Second round
5/WC	(Croatia) G Ivanišević	4	**6**	3
**(Croatia) I Ljubičić**	**6**	3	**6**
(Germany) T Behrend	5	1
3	**(Sweden) M Larsson**	**7**	**6**
7	**(Switzerland) R Federer**	**6**	**6**
(Sweden) F Jonsson	4	4
**(Italy) G Pozzi**	**6**	3	**6**
Q	(Finland) V Liukko	3	**6**	4

Quarterfinals
(Croatia) I Ljubičić	4	**7**	4
3	**(Sweden) M Larsson**	**6**	5	**6**
7	**(Switzerland) R Federer**	4	**6**	**6**
(Italy) G Pozzi	**6**	1	3

Semifinals
3	**(Sweden) M Larsson**	**6**	**7^{8}**
7	(Switzerland) R Federer	3	6^{6}

== Qualifying ==
=== Qualifying seeds ===
1. (n/a)
2. (Zimbabwe) Wayne Black (qualifying competition)
3. (Germany) Michael Kohlmann (first round)
4. (Italy) Cristiano Caratti (first round)
5. (n/a)
6. (United States) Michael Russell (second round)
7. (Czech Republic) Radek Štěpánek (first round)
8. (Germany) Andy Fahlke (second round)

=== Qualifiers ===
1. (Belgium) **Filip Dewulf**
2. (Switzerland) **Ivo Heuberger**
3. (Finland) **Ville Liukko**
4. (Czech Republic) **Petr Luxa**

=== Qualifying draw ===
==== First qualifier ====
First round
(Czech Republic) Leoš Friedl	1	5
**(Germany) Karsten Braasch**	**6**	**7**
**(Belgium) Filip Dewulf**	**6**	**6**
(United States) Geoff Grant	2	1
**(Germany) Dirk Dier**	**6**	**6**
(Sweden) Johan Settergren	4	3
**(Germany) Jan Boruszewski**	**6**	**7**
7	(Czech Republic) Radek Štěpánek	1	5

Second round
(Germany) Karsten Braasch	3	1
**(Belgium) Filip Dewulf**	**6**	**6**
(Germany) Dirk Dier	4	3
**(Germany) Jan Boruszewski**	**6**	**6**

Qualifying competition
**(Belgium) Filip Dewulf**	**6**	**6**
(Germany) Jan Boruszewski	4	4

==== Second qualifier ====
First round
2	**(Zimbabwe) Wayne Black**	**6**	**6**
(Belgium) Johan Van Herck	3	2
**(Czech Republic) Jan Hernych**	6^{4}	**6**	**6**
WC	(Germany) Martin Sinner	**7^{7}**	3	3
**(Switzerland) Ivo Heuberger**	**7^{7}**	**6**
(Portugal) Nuno Marques	6^{4}	3
(Norway) Jan Frode Andersen	**7^{7}**	4	4
8	**(Germany) Andy Fahlke**	6^{4}	**6**	**6**

Second round
2	**(Zimbabwe) Wayne Black**	5	**6**	**6**
(Czech Republic) Jan Hernych	**7**	1	2
**(Switzerland) Ivo Heuberger**	3	**6**	**6**
8	(Germany) Andy Fahlke	**6**	2	3

Qualifying competition
2	(Zimbabwe) Wayne Black	4	1
**(Switzerland) Ivo Heuberger**	**6**	**6**

==== Third qualifier ====
First round
3	(Germany) Michael Kohlmann	**6**	3	0
**(Argentina) Marcelo Charpentier**	3	**6**	**6**
WC	**(Denmark) Bob Borella**	**6**	**6**
(Sweden) Jan Hermansson	2	3
WC	(Sweden) Robin Söderling	1	5
**(Finland) Ville Liukko**	**6**	**7**
(Germany) Christian Vinck	3	1
6	**(United States) Michael Russell**	**6**	**6**

Second round
**(Argentina) Marcelo Charpentier**	**6**	**6**
WC	(Denmark) Bob Borella	2	0
**(Finland) Ville Liukko**	**6**	3	**7**
6	(United States) Michael Russell	3	**6**	5

Qualifying competition
(Argentina) Marcelo Charpentier	**6**	3	5
**(Finland) Ville Liukko**	0	**6**	**7**

==== Fourth qualifier ====
First round
4	(Italy) Cristiano Caratti	1	4
**(Germany) Daniel Elsner**	**6**	**6**
(Australia) Grant Doyle	3	4
**(Belarus) Vladimir Voltchkov**	**6**	**6**
WC	**(Denmark) Frederik Fetterlein**	**6**	**6**
(Germany) Jan Weinzierl	2	1
(Romania) Ionuț Moldovan	4	**6**	2
**(Czech Republic) Petr Luxa**	**6**	4	**6**

Second round
(Germany) Daniel Elsner	4	2
**(Belarus) Vladimir Voltchkov**	**6**	**6**
WC	(Denmark) Frederik Fetterlein	4	**6**	2
**(Czech Republic) Petr Luxa**	**6**	4	**6**

Qualifying competition
(Belarus) Vladimir Voltchkov	**6**	5	5
**(Czech Republic) Petr Luxa**	3	**7**	**7**
