= 2001 Copenhagen Open – Singles =

Singles
- 2001 Copenhagen Open

Final
- Champion: (United Kingdom) Tim Henman
- Runner-up: (Sweden) Andreas Vinciguerra
- Score: 6–3, 6–4

Details
- Draw: 32
- Seeds: 8

Events
| Singles | Doubles |
| ← 2000 · | Copenhagen Open | · 2002 → |

Andreas Vinciguerra was the defending champion but lost in the final 6–3, 6–4 against Tim Henman.

== Seeds ==
A champion seed is indicated in bold text while text in italics indicates the round in which that seed was eliminated.

1. (United Kingdom) **Tim Henman (champion)**
2. (Belarus) Vladimir Voltchkov (first round)
3. (Australia) Andrew Ilie (second round)
4. (Sweden) Andreas Vinciguerra (final)
5. (Sweden) Jonas Björkman (first round)
6. (Germany) Rainer Schüttler (second round)
7. (Czech Republic) Bohdan Ulihrach (quarterfinals)
8. (Czech Republic) Jiří Novák (first round)

== Draw ==
=== Key ===
- Q = Qualifier
- WC = Wild card
- LL = Lucky loser
- Alt = Alternate
- SE = Special exempt
- PR = Protected ranking
- ITF = ITF entry
- JE = Junior exempt
- w/o = Walkover
- r = Retired
- d = Defaulted
- SR = Special ranking

First round
1 | (United Kingdom) **T Henman** | **6** | 2 | **6**
(Czech Republic) C Doseděl | 4 | **6** | 1
Q | (Israel) N Behr | **7^{7}** | 6^{1} | 3
(Switzerland) **G Bastl** | 6^{5} | **7^{7}** | **6**
(France) **A Dupuis** | **7^{7}** | **6**
Q | (Norway) H Koll | 6^{2} | 4
(Italy) A Gaudenzi | 2 | 5
7 | (Czech Republic) **B Ulihrach** | **6** | **7**
3 | (Australia) **A Ilie** | 4 | **6** | **6**
(Czech Republic) T Zíb | **6** | 4 | 1
(Italy) D Sanguinetti | 2 | **7** | 4
(United States) **C Mamiit** | **6** | 5 | **6**
(Netherlands) **J Siemerink** | **7^{7}**
(Netherlands) R Sluiter | 6^{4} | r
(Germany) J Knippschild | **6** | 3 | 1
6 | (Germany) **R Schüttler** | 4 | **6** | **6**
5 | (Sweden) J Björkman | 4 | 4
(Czech Republic) **M Tabara** | **6** | **6**
Q | (Sweden) J Settergren | 4 | 5
LL | (Germany) **L Burgsmüller** | **6** | **7**
(Germany) C Vinck | 0 | 1
(United States) **P Goldstein** | **6** | **6**
(Canada) D Nestor | 4 | 4
4 | (Sweden) **A Vinciguerra** | **6** | **6**
8 | (Czech Republic) J Novák | 4 | 3
WC | (Denmark) **K Pless** | **6** | **6**
(Russia) **M Youzhny** | **7^{7}** | **6**
Q | (Germany) T Behrend | 6^{4} | 2
WC | (Sweden) J Johansson | 5 | 2
(Sweden) **M Gustafsson** | **7** | **6**
(Zimbabwe) **W Black** | **6** | **6**
2 | (Belarus) V Voltchkov | 4 | 2

Second round
1 | (United Kingdom) **T Henman** | **7** | **7**
(Switzerland) G Bastl | 5 | 5
(France) A Dupuis | 2 | **7^{7}** | 1
7 | (Czech Republic) **B Ulihrach** | **6** | 6^{3} | **6**
3 | (Australia) A Ilie | 4 | 3
(United States) **C Mamiit** | **6** | **6**
(Netherlands) **J Siemerink** | **6** | 1 | **6**
6 | (Germany) R Schüttler | 4 | **6** | 2
(Czech Republic) M Tabara | 4 | 5
LL | (Germany) **L Burgsmüller** | **6** | **7**
(United States) P Goldstein | 4 | 6^{3}
4 | (Sweden) **A Vinciguerra** | **6** | **7^{7}**
WC | (Denmark) K Pless | 4 | 4
(Russia) **M Youzhny** | **6** | **6**
(Sweden) **M Gustafsson** | 4 | **6** | **7^{7}**
(Zimbabwe) W Black | **6** | 4 | 6^{2}

Quarterfinals
1 | (United Kingdom) **T Henman** | **6** | **6**
7 | (Czech Republic) B Ulihrach | 3 | 4
(United States) C Mamiit | 4 | **7^{8}** | 3
(Netherlands) **J Siemerink** | **6** | 6^{6} | **6**
LL | (Germany) L Burgsmüller | 2 | 4
4 | (Sweden) **A Vinciguerra** | **6** | **6**
(Russia) **M Youzhny** | 4 | **7^{7}** | **7^{7}**
(Sweden) M Gustafsson | **6** | 6^{3} | 6^{2}

Semifinals
1 | (United Kingdom) **T Henman** | **6** | **7^{7}**
(Netherlands) J Siemerink | 4 | 6^{3}
4 | (Sweden) **A Vinciguerra** | **7** | 2 | **6**
(Russia) M Youzhny | 5 | **6** | 3

Final
1 | (United Kingdom) **Tim Henman** | **6** | **6**
4 | (Sweden) Andreas Vinciguerra | 3 | 4
