= 1998 Copenhagen Open =

- Date: 9–15 March
- Edition: 10th
- Category: International Series
- Surface: Carpet / indoor
- Location: Copenhagen, Denmark

Champions

Singles
- (Sweden) Magnus Gustafsson

Doubles
- (Netherlands) Tom Kempers / (Netherlands) Menno Oosting
← 1997 ·	Copenhagen Open	· 1999 →

The 1998 Copenhagen Open was a men's tennis tournament played on indoor carpet courts in Copenhagen, Denmark that was part of the International Series of the 1998 ATP Tour. It was the eleventh edition of the tournament and was held from 9 March until 15 March 1998. Magnus Gustafsson won the singles title.

== Finals ==
=== Singles ===
(Sweden) Magnus Gustafsson defeated (Germany) David Prinosil, 3–6, 6–1, 6–1.

- It was Gustafsson's 1st title of the year and the 11th of his career.

=== Doubles ===
(Netherlands) Tom Kempers / (Netherlands) Menno Oosting defeated (Australia) Brett Steven / (Netherlands) Jan Siemerink, 6–4, 7–6.

- It was Kempers' 1st title of the year and the 3rd of his career. It was Oosting's only title of the year and the 7th of his career.
