= 2003 Copenhagen Open – Doubles =

Doubles
- 2003 Copenhagen Open

Final
- Champions: (Czech Republic) Tomáš Cibulec (Czech Republic) Pavel Vízner
- Runners-up: (Austria) Julian Knowle (Germany) Michael Kohlmann
- Score: 7–5, 5–7, 6–2

Events
Singles	Doubles
← 2002 ·	Copenhagen Open

Julian Knowle and Michael Kohlmann were the defending champions but lost in the final 7–5, 5–7, 6–2 against Tomáš Cibulec and Pavel Vízner.

== Seeds ==
1. (Czech Republic) Tomáš Cibulec / (Czech Republic) Pavel Vízner (champions)
2. (Australia) Paul Hanley / (Australia) Nathan Healey (quarterfinals)
3. (Sweden) Simon Aspelin / (Czech Republic) Ota Fukárek (first round)
4. (Austria) Julian Knowle / (Germany) Michael Kohlmann (final)

== Draw ==
=== Key ===
- Q = Qualifier
- WC = Wild card
- LL = Lucky loser
- Alt = Alternate
- SE = Special exempt
- PR = Protected ranking
- ITF = ITF entry
- JE = Junior exempt
- w/o = Walkover
- r = Retired
- d = Defaulted
- SR = Special ranking

First round
1	(Czech Republic) T Cibulec (Czech Republic) P Vízner	6	7
(The Bahamas) M Merklein (Japan) T Shimada	3	5
WC	(Israel) A Hadad (Pakistan) A-u-H Qureshi	5	3
(Switzerland) G Bastl (Germany) D Prinosil	7	6
3	(Sweden) S Aspelin (Czech Republic) O Fukárek	6	5	2
(Slovakia) K Beck (Slovakia) K Kučera	4	7	6
(France) A Dupuis (United States) J Tarango	7^{7}	6
(Czech Republic) P Luxa (Czech Republic) D Škoch	6^{1}	4
(United States) D Bowen (Australia) A Fisher	4	3
(Australia) W Arthurs (Australia) S Huss	6	6
(Netherlands) R Sluiter (Netherlands) M Verkerk	5	3
4	(Austria) J Knowle (Germany) M Kohlmann	7	6
(Switzerland) M Kratochvil (United States) J Thomas	6	1	5
(Sweden) J Landsberg (Finland) J Nieminen	4	6	7
WC	(Denmark) K Carlsen (Sweden) M Norman	6	2	6^{9}
2	(Australia) P Hanley (Australia) N Healey	4	6	7^{11}

Quarterfinals
1	(Czech Republic) T Cibulec (Czech Republic) P Vízner	7	4	6
(Switzerland) G Bastl (Germany) D Prinosil	5	6	1
(Slovakia) K Beck (Slovakia) K Kučera	w/o
(France) A Dupuis (United States) J Tarango
(Australia) W Arthurs (Australia) S Huss	3	5
4	(Austria) J Knowle (Germany) M Kohlmann	6	7
(Sweden) J Landsberg (Finland) J Nieminen	6	6^{4}	6
2	(Australia) P Hanley (Australia) N Healey	2	7^{7}	2

Semifinals
1	(Czech Republic) T Cibulec (Czech Republic) P Vízner	w/o
(Slovakia) K Beck (Slovakia) K Kučera
4	(Austria) J Knowle (Germany) M Kohlmann	4	6	6
(Sweden) J Landsberg (Finland) J Nieminen	6	2	3

Final
1	(Czech Republic) T Cibulec (Czech Republic) P Vízner	7	5	6
4	(Austria) J Knowle (Germany) M Kohlmann	5	7	2
