= Jonathan Printzlau =

Danish tennis player

- Country (sports): Denmark
- Born: 7 October 1976 (age 48)
- Plays: Right-handed
- Prize money: $5,322

Singles
- Career record: 0–1
- Highest ranking: No. 407 (27 Oct 1997)

Doubles
- Career record: 0–2
- Highest ranking: No. 593 (20 Jul 1998)

Jonathan Printzlau (born 7 October 1976) is a retired tennis player from Denmark. He is the son the former Danish footballer, Leif Printzlau.

== Tennis career ==
Printzlau represented Denmark in the Davis Cup from 2000 until 2003. During his Davis Cup career, he played in seven ties and won 1 of the 3 singles matches and 3 of the 6 doubles matches that he played.

Printzlau mainly participated on the Satellite and Futures circuit and won one doubles title on the Futures circuit. On the ATP Tour he twice participated in the main draw of the doubles at the Copenhagen Open. In 1996, with Patrik Langvardt, they lost in the first round to Stephen Noteboom and Fernon Wibier and in 1998, with Jan-Axel Tribler, he also lost in the first round to Nicklas Kulti and Mikael Tillström.

== ITF Futures titles ==
=== Doubles: 1 ===
No.	Date	Tournament	Tier	Surface	Partner	Opponents	Score
1.	Jul 1998	Denmark F2, Odense	Futures	Clay	(Denmark) Jan-Axel Tribler	(Sweden) Daniel Påhlsson (Sweden) Robert Samuelsson	7–6, 6–4

== See also ==
- List of Denmark Davis Cup team representatives
