= Andreas Vinciguerra =

Swedish tennis player

- Country (sports): Sweden
- Born: 19 February 1981 (age 45) Malmö, Sweden
- Height: 1.80 m (5 ft 11 in)
- Turned pro: 1998
- Retired: 2013
- Plays: Left-handed (two-handed backhand)
- Coach: Mikael Tillström
- Prize money: $1,381,556

Singles
- Career record: 87–103
- Career titles: 1
- Highest ranking: No. 33 (5 November 2001)

Grand Slam singles results
- Australian Open: 4R (2001)
- French Open: 2R (2001)
- Wimbledon: 2R (2000, 2001)
- US Open: 2R (2003)

Other tournaments
- Olympic Games: 2R (2000)

Doubles
- Career record: 11–22
- Career titles: 0
- Highest ranking: No. 261 (19 February 2001)
- Last updated on: 23 April 2022.

Andreas Vinciguerra (Italian pronunciation: [anˈdrɛːaz vintʃiˈɡwɛrra]; born 19 February 1981) is a former tennis player from Sweden, who turned professional in 1998. He won one singles title in Copenhagen; reached the semi-finals of the 2001 Rome Masters and 2001 Paris Masters; and attained a career-high singles ranking of World No. 33 in November 2001. He is also known as the co-record holder for the longest gap (402 weeks) between semifinals on the ATP Tour; he achieved this by reaching semifinal at the 2009 Swedish Open, his first since the Paris Masters in 2001. He held the record alone, until it was matched by Marco Trungelliti in 2026.

== Tennis career ==
Vinciguerra is of Italian origin on his father's side.

=== Junior career ===
As a junior, Vinciguerra reached as high as No. 6 in the world in 1998.

His Junior Slam results include:

Australian Open: F (1998)
French Open: SF (1998)
Wimbledon: -
US Open: 1R (1998)

=== Pro career ===
He experienced significant problems with a back injury, but in 2006, he made a comeback.

Has played nine Davis Cup matches in singles, and won three .

In the 2009 World Group Playoffs in March 2009, Sweden faced Israel in Vinciguerra's hometown. Dudi Sela first defeated Vinciguerra 11–9 in the fifth set. Harel Levy then beat Vinciguerra in the decisive final match in a marathon 3-hour, 44 minutes, 8–6 in the fifth set, to lead the Israeli team to a come-from-behind 3–2 victory over the 7-time Davis Cup champion Swedes at Baltic Hall in Malmö, Sweden, and allow Israel to advance in the 2009 Davis Cup.

After the Davis Cup, Vinciguerra reached his first tournament of the year the final at the Rome Challenger. He then received a wild card to the 2009 Swedish Open where he made it to the semifinals. By making semifinals, his first since and 2001 Paris Masters, he holds the all time record for the longest gap between semi finals on the ATP Tour of 402 weeks. This record was equaled by Marco Trungelliti in April 2026.

== ATP career finals ==
=== Singles: 4 (1 title, 3 runners-up) ===
Legend Grand Slam Tournaments (0–0) ATP World Tour Finals (0–0) ATP Masters 1000 Series (0–0) ATP 500 Series (0–0) ATP 250 Series (1–3)	Finals by surface Hard (1–1) Clay (0–2) Grass (0–0) Carpet (0–0)	Finals by setting Outdoors (0–2) Indoors (1–1)

Result	W–L	Date	Tournament	Tier	Surface	Opponent	Score
Loss	0–1	Jul 1999	Båstad, Sweden	International Series	Clay	(Costa Rica) Juan Antonio Marín	4–6, 6–7^{(4–7)}
Win	1–1	Mar 2000	Copenhagen, Denmark	International Series	Hard	(Sweden) Magnus Larsson	6–3, 7–6^{(7–5)}
Loss	1–2	Jul 2000	Båstad, Sweden	International Series	Clay	(Sweden) Magnus Norman	1–6, 6–7^{(6–8)}
Loss	1–3	Feb 2001	Copenhagen, Denmark	International Series	Hard	(United Kingdom) Tim Henman	3–6, 4–6

== ATP Challenger and ITF Futures finals ==
=== Singles: 10 (5–5) ===
Legend ATP Challenger (3–4) ITF Futures (2–1)	Finals by surface Hard (1–2) Clay (3–3) Grass (0–0) Carpet (1–0)

Result	W–L	Date	Tournament	Tier	Surface	Opponent	Score
Loss	0-1	Jul 1998	Denmark F1, Kolding	Futures	Clay	(Denmark) Frederik Fetterlein	1–6, 2–6
Win	1-1	Oct 1998	Finland F4, Oulu	Futures	Carpet	(France) Olivier Tauma	6–3, 1–0 ret.
Win	2-1	Sep 1999	Szczecin, Poland	Challenger	Clay	(Costa Rica) Juan Antonio Marín	6–2, 6–4
Win	3-1	Jun 2000	Prostějov, Czech Republic	Challenger	Clay	(France) Jérôme Golmard	walkover
Loss	3-2	Mar 2006	Sarajevo, Bosnia & Herzegovina	Challenger	Hard	(Germany) Andreas Beck	6–2, 6–7^{(1–7)}, 6–7^{(4–7)}
Loss	3-3	Aug 2006	Trani, Italy	Challenger	Hard	(Argentina) Juan Pablo Guzmán	1–6, 6–3, 6–7^{(1–7)}
Win	4-3	Aug 2006	Manerbio, Italy	Challenger	Clay	(Chile) Adrián García	7–6^{(7–3)}, 6–1
Loss	4-4	Sep 2006	Düsseldorf, Germany	Challenger	Clay	(Russia) Evgeny Korolev	6–7^{(4–7)}, 3–6
Loss	4-5	Apr 2009	Rome, Italy	Challenger	Clay	(Austria) Daniel Köllerer	3–6, 3–6
Win	5-5	Oct 2012	Sweden F7, Jönköping	Futures	Hard	(Canada) Érik Chvojka	6–4, 7–6^{(7–3)}

=== Doubles: 1 (0–1) ===
Legend ATP Challenger (0–0) ITF Futures (0–1)	Finals by surface Hard (0–0) Clay (0–1) Grass (0–0) Carpet (0–0)

Result	W–L	Date	Tournament	Tier	Surface	Partner	Opponents	Score
Loss	0-1	Jun 2013	Italy F10, Cesena	Futures	Clay	(Netherlands) Sander Groen	(Argentina) Guido Andreozzi (Argentina) Agustín Velotti	4–6, 1–6

== Junior Grand Slam finals ==
=== Singles: 1 (1 runner-up) ===
Result	Year	Tournament	Surface	Opponent	Score
Loss	1998	Australian Open	Hard	(France) Julien Jeanpierre	6–4, 4–6, 3–6

== Performance timeline ==
Key
**W**	F	SF	QF	#R	RR	Q#	DNQ	A	NH

(W) winner; (F) finalist; (SF) semifinalist; (QF) quarterfinalist; (#R) rounds 4, 3, 2, 1; (RR) round-robin stage; (Q#) qualification round; (DNQ) did not qualify; (A) absent; (NH) not held; (SR) strike rate (events won / competed); (W–L) win–loss record.

=== Singles ===
Tournament	2000	2001	2002	2003	2004	2005	2006	SR	W–L	Win %
**Grand Slam tournaments**
Australian Open	3R	4R	2R	3R	A	A	Q1	0 / 4	8–4	67%
French Open	1R	2R	A	1R	A	A	A	0 / 3	1–3	25%
Wimbledon	2R	2R	A	1R	A	A	A	0 / 3	2–3	40%
US Open	1R	1R	1R	2R	A	A	A	0 / 4	1–4	20%
Win–loss	3–4	5–4	1–2	3–4	0–0	0–0	0–0	0 / 14	12–14	46%
**ATP World Tour Masters 1000**
Indian Wells	A	1R	A	A	A	A	A	0 / 1	0–1	0%
Miami	3R	2R	A	A	A	A	A	0 / 2	3–2	60%
Monte Carlo	1R	1R	1R	A	A	A	A	0 / 3	0–3	0%
Rome	Q2	SF	A	A	A	A	A	0 / 1	4–1	80%
Hamburg	A	1R	A	A	A	A	A	0 / 1	0–1	0%
Canada	1R	2R	A	A	A	A	A	0 / 2	1–2	33%
Cincinnati	1R	1R	A	A	A	A	A	0 / 2	0–2	0%
Stuttgart	1R	1R	Not Held					0 / 2	0–2	0%
Paris	A	SF	A	A	A	A	A	0 / 1	4–1	80%
Win–loss	2–5	10–9	0–1	0–0	0–0	0–0	0–0	0 / 15	12–15	44%

=== Records ===
==== Open Era records ====
- These records were attained in the Open Era of tennis.
- Records in **bold** indicate peer-less achievements.

Tournament	Year	Record accomplished	Player tied
**ATP Tour**	2009	Longest gap (402 Weeks) between semifinal appearances on the ATP Tour	Marco Trungelliti
