= 1996 Franklin Templeton Classic – Doubles =

Tennis tournament

Doubles
- 1996 Franklin Templeton Classic

Final
- Champions: (United States) Patrick Galbraith (United States) Rick Leach
- Runners-up: (United States) Richey Reneberg (New Zealand) Brett Steven
- Score: 5–7, 7–5, 7–5

Details
- Draw: 16
- Seeds: 4

Events
Singles	Doubles
← 1995 ·	Franklin Templeton Classic	· 1997 →

Trevor Kronemann and David Macpherson were the defending champions but lost in the semifinals to Patrick Galbraith and Rick Leach.

Galbraith and Leach won in the final 5–7, 7–5, 7–5 against Richey Reneberg and Brett Steven.

== Seeds ==
1. (United States) Patrick Galbraith / (United States) Rick Leach (champions)
2. (United States) Patrick McEnroe / (Australia) Sandon Stolle (first round)
3. (Sweden) Jonas Björkman / (Sweden) Stefan Edberg (first round)
4. (United States) Trevor Kronemann / (Australia) David Macpherson (semifinals)

== Draw ==
=== Key ===
- Q = Qualifier
- WC = Wild card
- LL = Lucky loser
- Alt = Alternate
- SE = Special exempt
- PR = Protected ranking
- ITF = ITF entry
- JE = Junior exempt
- w/o = Walkover
- r = Retired
- d = Defaulted
- SR = Special ranking

First round
1	(United States) P Galbraith (United States) R Leach	6	7
(United States) L Jensen (United States) M Jensen	1	6
(Netherlands) T Nijssen (United States) G Van Emburgh	2	6
(United States) M Lucena (Canada) G Michibata	6	7
4	(United States) T Kronemann (Australia) D Macpherson	7	1
(Canada) G Connell (United States) S Davis	6	0^{r}
(South Africa) G Muller (United States) J Waite	3	7	7
(Australia) J Eagle (Australia) A Florent	6	6	5
WC	(Germany) T Haas (United States) G Hill	2	4
WC	(United States) K Flach (United States) K Jones	6	6
(United States) K Kinnear (United States) D Randall	6	6
3	(Sweden) J Björkman (Sweden) S Edberg	4	4
Q	(Spain) À Corretja (Netherlands) S Schalken	2	5
WC	(United States) MV Washington (United States) M Washington	6	7
(United States) R Reneberg (New Zealand) B Steven	6	6
2	(United States) P McEnroe (Australia) S Stolle	3	4

Quarterfinals
1	(United States) P Galbraith (United States) R Leach	6	6
(United States) M Lucena (Canada) G Michibata	1	1
4	(United States) T Kronemann (Australia) D Macpherson	6	7	6
(South Africa) G Muller (United States) J Waite	7	6	4
WC	(United States) K Flach (United States) K Jones	6	6	6
(United States) K Kinnear (United States) D Randall	7	4	4
WC	(United States) MV Washington (United States) M Washington	0	6
2	(United States) R Reneberg (New Zealand) B Steven	6	7

Semifinals
1	(United States) P Galbraith (United States) R Leach	6	6
4	(United States) T Kronemann (Australia) D Macpherson	4	2
WC	(United States) K Flach (United States) K Jones	4	1
2	(United States) R Reneberg (New Zealand) B Steven	6	6

Final
1	(United States) P Galbraith (United States) R Leach	5	7	7
2	(United States) R Reneberg (New Zealand) B Steven	7	5	5
