= 1998 Franklin Templeton Tennis Classic – Singles =

Tennis tournament

Singles
- 1998 Franklin Templeton Tennis Classic

Final
- Champion: (United States) Andre Agassi
- Runner-up: (Australia) Jason Stoltenberg
- Score: 6–4, 7–6^{(7–3)}

Details
- Draw: 32 (3WC/4Q/1LL/1SE)
- Seeds: 8

Events
Singles	Doubles
← 1997 ·	Tennis Channel Open	· 1999 →

Mark Philippoussis was the defending champion, but lost in the second round to Tommy Haas.

Andre Agassi won the title, defeating Jason Stoltenberg 6–4, 7–6^{(7–3)} in the final.

== Seeds ==
1. (Australia) Mark Philippoussis (second round)
2. (Spain) Álbert Costa (quarterfinals)
3. (Sweden) Magnus Norman (first round)
4. (Germany) Nicolas Kiefer (second round)
5. (Spain) Francisco Clavet (first round)
6. (Spain) Albert Portas (first round)
7. (Spain) Julián Alonso (first round)
8. (Australia) Richard Fromberg (second round)

== Draw ==
=== Key ===
- Q = Qualifier
- WC = Wild card
- LL = Lucky loser
- Alt = Alternate
- SE = Special exempt
- PR = Protected ranking
- ITF = ITF entry
- JE = Junior exempt
- w/o = Walkover
- r = Retired
- d = Defaulted
- SR = Special ranking

=== Finals ===
Semifinals
(Germany) Tommy Haas	2	1
WC	(United States) Andre Agassi	6	6
(Australia) Jason Stoltenberg	6	6
(Netherlands) Sjeng Schalken	3	3

Final
WC	(United States) Andre Agassi	6	7^{7}
(Australia) Jason Stoltenberg	4	6^{3}

=== Top half ===
First round
1	(Australia) M Philippoussis	6	7
Q	(Argentina) F Squillari	2	5
(Germany) T Haas	6	6
Q	(United States) M Joyce	2	2
(Uruguay) M Filippini	0	4
SE	(Canada) S Lareau	6	6
(Slovakia) D Hrbatý	6	6
7	(Spain) J Alonso	2	2
4	(Germany) N Kiefer	6	6
LL	(Australia) S Draper	3	4
(Australia) M Woodforde	4	6	5
Q	(United States) J-M Gambill	6	2	7
(Spain) J Sánchez	6	3	2
(Ecuador) N Lapentti	3	6	6
WC	(United States) A Agassi	3	6	6
6	(Spain) A Portas	6	1	2

Second round
1	(Australia) M Philippoussis	7	2	0
(Germany) T Haas	5	6	6
SE	(Canada) S Lareau	7^{7}	7
(Slovakia) D Hrbatý	6^{3}	5
4	(Germany) N Kiefer	2	1
Q	(United States) J-M Gambill	6	6
(Ecuador) N Lapentti	5	1
WC	(United States) A Agassi	7	6

Quarterfinals
(Germany) T Haas	6	6
SE	(Canada) S Lareau	4	1
Q	(United States) J-M Gambill	3	6^{5}
WC	(United States) A Agassi	6	7^{7}

Semifinals
(Germany) T Haas	2	1
WC	(United States) A Agassi	6	6

=== Bottom half ===
First round
5	(Spain) F Clavet	6	6^{5}	4
(United States) J Tarango	4	7^{7}	6
(Italy) A Gaudenzi	6	6
(Brazil) F Meligeni	1	4
(Norway) C Ruud	3	7^{10}	3
(Australia) J Stoltenberg	6	6^{8}	6
(Spain) C Costa	6	7^{8}
3	(Sweden) M Norman	4	6^{6}
8	(Australia) R Fromberg	6	6
WC	(Germany) T Messmer	1	2
(Netherlands) S Schalken	6	7^{7}
(Spain) G Blanco	3	6^{4}
WC	(Armenia) S Sargsian	6	3	6
Q	(Paraguay) R Delgado	2	6	1
(Czech Republic) S Doseděl	6^{5}	1
2	(Spain) Á Costa	7^{7}	6

Second round
(United States) J Tarango	4	6	3
(Italy) A Gaudenzi	6	3	6
(Australia) J Stoltenberg	6	2	6
(Spain) C Costa	3	6	4
8	(Australia) R Fromberg	6	6^{5}	6^{0}
(Netherlands) S Schalken	4	7^{7}	7^{7}
WC	(Armenia) S Sargsian	3	6	1
2	(Spain) Á Costa	6	3	6

Quarterfinals
(Italy) A Gaudenzi	5	6^{12}
(Australia) J Stoltenberg	7	7^{14}
(Netherlands) S Schalken	6	6
2	(Spain) Á Costa	3	4

Semifinals
(Australia) J Stoltenberg	6	6
(Netherlands) S Schalken	3	3

== Qualifying ==
=== Qualifying seeds ===
1. (Zimbabwe) Byron Black (second round)
2. (Spain) Juan Albert Viloca (second round)
3. (Australia) Scott Draper (qualifying competition, lucky loser)
4. (Zimbabwe) Wayne Black (first round)
5. (Germany) Oliver Gross (second round)
6. (Argentina) Franco Squillari (qualified)
7. (Australia) Sandon Stolle (first round)
8. (United States) Alex O'Brien (first round)

=== Qualifiers ===
1. (United States) Michael Joyce
2. (United States) Jan-Michael Gambill
3. (Argentina) Franco Squillari
4. (Paraguay) Ramón Delgado

=== Lucky loser ===
1. (Australia) Scott Draper

=== Special exempt ===
1. (Canada) Sébastien Lareau (reached the semifinals at Philadelphia)

=== Qualifying draw ===
==== First qualifier ====
First round
1	(Zimbabwe) Byron Black	6	6
(Australia) Michael Tebbutt	2	2
WC	(Chile) Nicolás Massú	1	2
(Spain) Emilio Benfele Álvarez	6	6
WC	(Belgium) Xavier Malisse	6	4
(France) Sébastien de Chaunac	7	6
(United States) Michael Joyce	7	6
7	(Australia) Sandon Stolle	5	3

Second round
1	(Zimbabwe) Byron Black	6	4
(Spain) Emilio Benfele Álvarez	7	6
(France) Sébastien de Chaunac	4	3
(United States) Michael Joyce	6	6

Qualifying competition
(Spain) Emilio Benfele Álvarez	6	4
(United States) Michael Joyce	7	6

==== Second qualifier ====
First round
2	(Spain) Juan Albert Viloca	6	6
(United States) Jeff Salzenstein	4	2
(Brazil) Roberto Jabali	3	6	5
(United States) Jan-Michael Gambill	6	1	7
(Spain) David Sánchez	7	1	6
(Russia) Marat Safin	6	6	4
(United States) David Wheaton	6	6
8	(United States) Alex O'Brien	3	4

Second round
2	(Spain) Juan Albert Viloca	1	3
(United States) Jan-Michael Gambill	6	6
(Spain) David Sánchez	6	6
(United States) David Wheaton	3	2

Qualifying competition
(United States) Jan-Michael Gambill	7	7
(Spain) David Sánchez	6	6

==== Third qualifier ====
First round
3	(Australia) Scott Draper	6	6
(Norway) Jan Frode Andersen	2	4
WC	(Germany) Daniel Elsner	6	7
(Brazil) Jaime Oncins	4	5
(Chile) Gabriel Silberstein	2	0
(Spain) Quino Muñoz	6	6
(Germany) Marcello Craca	6	7	5
6	(Argentina) Franco Squillari	7	6	7

Second round
3	(Australia) Scott Draper	6	6
WC	(Germany) Daniel Elsner	0	4
(Spain) Quino Muñoz	3	6	6
6	(Argentina) Franco Squillari	6	3	7

Qualifying competition
3	(Australia) Scott Draper	4	4
6	(Argentina) Franco Squillari	6	6

==== Fourth qualifier ====
First round
4	(Zimbabwe) Wayne Black	4	7	2
(United States) David Witt	6	6	6
(Argentina) Guillermo Cañas	4	2
(Australia) Lleyton Hewitt	6	6
(Paraguay) Ramón Delgado	6	6
WC	(United States) Chase Exon	3	4
(United States) Wade McGuire	2	3
5	(Germany) Oliver Gross	6	6

Second round
(United States) David Witt	6	7
(Australia) Lleyton Hewitt	4	6
(Paraguay) Ramón Delgado	6	6
5	(Germany) Oliver Gross	3	3

Qualifying competition
(United States) David Witt	1	6
(Paraguay) Ramón Delgado	6	7
