= 1996 Franklin Templeton Classic – Singles =

Tennis tournament

Singles
- 1996 Franklin Templeton Classic

Final
- Champion: (South Africa) Wayne Ferreira
- Runner-up: (Chile) Marcelo Ríos
- Score: 2–6, 6–3, 6–3

Details
- Draw: 32
- Seeds: 8

Events
Singles	Doubles
← 1995 ·	Franklin Templeton Classic	· 1997 →

Jim Courier was the defending champion but did not compete that year.

Wayne Ferreira won in the final 2–6, 6–3, 6–3 against Marcelo Ríos.

== Seeds ==
1. (South Africa) Wayne Ferreira (champion)
2. (United States) Todd Martin (second round)
3. (United States) MaliVai Washington (first round)
4. (Spain) Albert Costa (quarterfinals)
5. (Austria) Gilbert Schaller (first round)
6. (Chile) Marcelo Ríos (final)
7. (Sweden) Magnus Larsson (second round)
8. (Sweden) Jonas Björkman (second round)

== Draw ==
=== Key ===
- Q = Qualifier
- WC = Wild card
- LL = Lucky loser
- Alt = Alternate
- SE = Special exempt
- PR = Protected ranking
- ITF = ITF entry
- JE = Junior exempt
- w/o = Walkover
- r = Retired
- d = Defaulted
- SR = Special ranking

=== Finals ===
Semifinals
1	(South Africa) Wayne Ferreira	6	6
(Spain) Alberto Berasategui	4	0
6	(Chile) Marcelo Ríos	6	7
Q	(Australia) Sandon Stolle	4	5

Final
1	(South Africa) Wayne Ferreira	2	6	6
6	(Chile) Marcelo Ríos	6	3	3

=== Top half ===
First round
1	(South Africa) W Ferreira	7	6
(Netherlands) S Schalken	5	1
(New Zealand) B Steven	6	4	6
(Germany) B Karbacher	2	6	2
WC	(United States) J Gimelstob	6	6
(Slovakia) K Kučera	4	2
(Argentina) H Gumy	4	6	1
8	(Sweden) J Björkman	6	3	6
WC/3	(United States) MV Washington	4	5
(Spain) A Berasategui	6	7
(Japan) S Matsuoka	6	6
Q	(United States) M Washington	2	2
(United States) R Reneberg	6	6
Q	(United States) J Waite	3	1
(United States) P McEnroe	6	7^{7}
5	(Austria) G Schaller	1	6^{1}

Second round
1	(South Africa) W Ferreira	6	6
(New Zealand) B Steven	4	4
WC	(United States) J Gimelstob	2	7	6
8	(Sweden) J Björkman	6	5	2
(Spain) A Berasategui	6	6
(Japan) S Matsuoka	3	4
(United States) R Reneberg	w/o
(United States) P McEnroe

Quarterfinals
1	(South Africa) W Ferreira	2	6	7
WC	(United States) J Gimelstob	6	4	5
(Spain) A Berasategui	6	3	7^{7}
(United States) R Reneberg	4	6	6^{2}

Semifinals
1	(South Africa) W Ferreira	6	6
(Spain) A Berasategui	4	0

=== Bottom half ===
First round
6	(Chile) M Ríos	6	6
(Russia) A Chesnokov	1	4
Q	(Canada) D Nestor	6	6
WC	(United States) L Jensen	3	4
(Spain) J Burillo	3	6	6
(Spain) À Corretja	6	3	4
(Spain) C Costa	5	4
4	(Spain) A Costa	7	6
7	(Sweden) M Larsson	7^{7}	6
LL	(South Africa) M Ondruska	6^{4}	1
Q	(Australia) S Stolle	7^{7}	6
(Morocco) Y El Aynaoui	6^{5}	4
(Sweden) S Edberg	7	6
(Italy) S Pescosolido	5	3
(Australia) S Draper	4	3
2	(United States) T Martin	6	6

Second round
6	(Chile) M Ríos	7^{8}	4	7^{9}
Q	(Canada) D Nestor	6^{6}	6	6^{7}
(Spain) J Burillo	3	3
4	(Spain) A Costa	6	6
7	(Sweden) M Larsson
Q	(Australia) S Stolle	w/o
(Sweden) S Edberg	7	6
2	(United States) T Martin	5	2

Quarterfinals
6	(Chile) M Ríos	7^{8}	6
4	(Spain) A Costa	6^{6}	1
Q	(Australia) S Stolle	7	6
(Sweden) S Edberg	5	3

Semifinals
6	(Chile) M Ríos	6	7
Q	(Australia) S Stolle	4	5
