= 1998 Franklin Templeton Tennis Classic – Doubles =

Tennis tournament

Doubles
- 1998 Franklin Templeton Tennis Classic

Final
- Champions: (Czech Republic) Cyril Suk (Australia) Michael Tebbutt
- Runners-up: (United States) Kent Kinnear (United States) David Wheaton
- Score: 4–6, 6–1, 7–6

Details
- Draw: 16 (3WC/1Q)
- Seeds: 4

Events
Singles	Doubles
← 1997 ·	Tennis Channel Open	· 1999 →

Luis Lobo and Javier Sánchez were the defending champions, but Sánchez did not participate this year. Lobo partnered Daniel Orsanic, losing in the first round.

Cyril Suk and Michael Tebbutt won the title, defeating Kent Kinnear and David Wheaton 4–6, 6–1, 7–6 in the final.

== Seeds ==
1. (The Bahamas) Mark Knowles / (Australia) Mark Woodforde (quarterfinals)
2. (South Africa) Ellis Ferreira / (United States) Rick Leach (first round)
3. (United States) Patrick Galbraith / (Australia) David Macpherson (first round)
4. (Argentina) Luis Lobo / (Argentina) Daniel Orsanic (first round)

== Draw ==
=== Key ===
- Q = Qualifier
- WC = Wild card
- LL = Lucky loser
- Alt = Alternate
- SE = Special exempt
- PR = Protected ranking
- ITF = ITF entry
- JE = Junior exempt
- w/o = Walkover
- r = Retired
- d = Defaulted
- SR = Special ranking

=== Draw ===
First round
1	(The Bahamas) M Knowles (Australia) M Woodforde	7	7
(Zimbabwe) W Black (United States) J Salzenstein	6	6
WC	(Germany) N Kiefer (Sweden) M Norman	2	7	5
WC	(Belgium) X Malisse (Armenia) S Sargsian	6	6	7
3	(United States) P Galbraith (Australia) D Macpherson	6	6
(South Africa) J-L de Jager (South Africa) R Koenig	7	7
(Spain) J Alonso (Ecuador) N Lapentti	1	4
Q	(United States) K Kinnear (United States) D Wheaton	6	6
(United States) L Jensen (United States) M Jensen	6	3
(Mexico) D Roditi (South Africa) B Talbot	7	6
(Canada) S Lareau (United States) J Tarango	6	7
4	(Argentina) L Lobo (Argentina) D Orsanic	3	6
(United States) D Randall (United States) J Waite	6	6
WC	(Germany) B Becker (Germany) T Messmer	2	0
(Czech Republic) C Suk (Australia) M Tebbutt	4	6	7
2	(South Africa) E Ferreira (United States) R Leach	6	1	6

Quarterfinals
1	(The Bahamas) M Knowles (Australia) M Woodforde	4	6	5
WC	(Belgium) X Malisse (Armenia) S Sargsian	6	4	7
(South Africa) J-L de Jager (South Africa) R Koenig	6	3
Q	(United States) K Kinnear (United States) D Wheaton	7	6
(Mexico) D Roditi (South Africa) B Talbot	3	2
(Canada) S Lareau (United States) J Tarango	6	6
(United States) D Randall (United States) J Waite	2	6	2
(Czech Republic) C Suk (Australia) M Tebbutt	6	4	6

Semifinals
WC	(Belgium) X Malisse (Armenia) S Sargsian	3	6
Q	(United States) K Kinnear (United States) D Wheaton	6	7
(Canada) S Lareau (United States) J Tarango	4	7	2
(Czech Republic) C Suk (Australia) M Tebbutt	6	5	6

Final
Q	(United States) K Kinnear (United States) D Wheaton	6	1	6
(Czech Republic) C Suk (Australia) M Tebbutt	4	6	7

== Qualifying ==
=== Qualifying seeds ===
1. (United States) Mark Keil / (United States) T. J. Middleton (qualifying competition)
2. (United States) Kent Kinnear / (United States) David Wheaton (qualified)

=== Qualifiers ===
1. (United States) Kent Kinnear / (United States) David Wheaton

=== Qualifying draw ===
First round
1	(United States) Mark Keil (United States) T. J. Middleton	7	6
WC	(United States) Darin Pleasant (United States) Andrew Stoner	6	2
(Australia) Scott Draper (United States) Greg Van Emburgh	4	6
2	(United States) Kent Kinnear (United States) David Wheaton	6	7

Qualifying competition
1	(United States) Mark Keil (United States) T. J. Middleton	7	6	6
2	(United States) Kent Kinnear (United States) David Wheaton	6	7	7
