= 1995 MassMutual Championships – Doubles =

Tennis tournament

Doubles
- 1995 Tennis Channel Open

Final
- Champions: (United States) Trevor Kronemann (Australia) David Macpherson
- Runners-up: (Argentina) Luis Lobo (Spain) Javier Sánchez
- Score: 4–6, 6–3, 6–4

Details
- Draw: 16
- Seeds: 4

Events
Singles	Doubles
← 1994 ·	Tennis Channel Open	· 1996 →

Jan Apell and Ken Flach were the defending champions, but did not participate this year.

Trevor Kronemann and David Macpherson won the title, defeating Luis Lobo and Javier Sánchez 4–6, 6–3, 6–4 in the final.

== Seeds ==
1. (Australia) Sandon Stolle / (Australia) Mark Woodforde (semifinals)
2. (Sweden) Jonas Björkman / (Sweden) Henrik Holm (first round)
3. (Argentina) Luis Lobo / (Spain) Javier Sánchez (final)
4. (Australia) John Fitzgerald / (Australia) Patrick Rafter (first round)

== Draw ==
=== Key ===
- Q = Qualifier
- WC = Wild card
- LL = Lucky loser
- Alt = Alternate
- SE = Special exempt
- PR = Protected ranking
- ITF = ITF entry
- JE = Junior exempt
- w/o = Walkover
- r = Retired
- d = Defaulted
- SR = Special ranking

=== Draw ===
First round
1	(Australia) S Stolle (Australia) M Woodforde	6	6
Q	(United States) D Flach (France) F Santoro	1	4
WC	(United States) P Annacone (United States) P Sampras	3	1
WC	(United States) S Davis (Sweden) S Edberg	6	6
3	(Argentina) L Lobo (Spain) J Sánchez	6	3	7
(Australia) A Florent (Zimbabwe) K Ullyett	4	6	5
(United States) R Leach (United States) S Melville	3	7	6
WC	(United States) V Spadea (Australia) M Tebbutt	6	6	2
(United States) K Jones (United States) D Pate	7	7
(United Kingdom) N Broad (United States) G Van Emburgh	6	6
(South Africa) E Ferreira (United States) D Randall	6	7
4	(Australia) J Fitzgerald (Australia) P Rafter	4	6
(United States) L Jensen (United States) M Jensen	7	6
(South Africa) B Haygarth (South Africa) B Talbot	5	4
(United States) T Kronemann (Australia) D Macpherson	6	6	6
2	(Sweden) J Björkman (Sweden) H Holm	4	7	3

Quarterfinals
1	(Australia) S Stolle (Australia) M Woodforde	6	6
WC	(United States) S Davis (Sweden) S Edberg	4	2
3	(Argentina) L Lobo (Spain) J Sánchez	6	7	7
(United States) R Leach (United States) S Melville	7	6	6
(United States) K Jones (United States) D Pate	6	6
(South Africa) E Ferreira (United States) D Randall	3	2
(United States) L Jensen (United States) M Jensen	6	3	4
(United States) T Kronemann (Australia) D Macpherson	4	6	6

Semifinals
1	(Australia) S Stolle (Australia) M Woodforde	4	4
3	(Argentina) L Lobo (Spain) J Sánchez	6	6
(United States) K Jones (United States) D Pate	6	6	1
(United States) T Kronemann (Australia) D Macpherson	7	2	6

Final
3	(Argentina) L Lobo (Spain) J Sánchez	6	3	4
(United States) T Kronemann (Australia) D Macpherson	4	6	6
