= 1997 Franklin Templeton Classic =

- Date: March 3–9
- Edition: 10th
- Category: World Series
- Draw: 32S / 16D
- Prize money: $303,000
- Surface: Hard / outdoor
- Location: Scottsdale, Arizona, US

Champions

Singles
- (Australia) Mark Philippoussis

Doubles
- (Argentina) Luis Lobo / (Spain) Javier Sánchez
← 1996 ·	Franklin Templeton Classic	· 1998 →

The 1997 Franklin Templeton Classic was a men's tennis tournament played on outdoor hard courts in Scottsdale, Arizona in the United States and was part of the World Series of the 1997 ATP Tour. It was the tenth edition of the tournament and was from March 3 through March 9, 1997. Unseeded Mark Philippoussis won the singles title.

== Finals ==
=== Singles ===
(Australia) Mark Philippoussis defeated (United States) Richey Reneberg 6–4, 7–6^{(7–4)}

- It was Philippoussis' 1st singles title of the year and the 2nd of his career.

=== Doubles ===
(Argentina) Luis Lobo / (Spain) Javier Sánchez defeated (Sweden) Jonas Björkman / (United States) Rick Leach 6–3, 6–3

- It was Lobo's 2nd title of the year and the 7th of his career. It was Sánchez's 2nd title of the year and the 26th of his career.
