= 2000 Franklin Templeton Tennis Classic – Doubles =

Tennis tournament

Doubles
- 2000 Tennis Channel Open

Final
- Champions: (United States) Jared Palmer (United States) Richey Reneberg
- Runners-up: (United States) Patrick Galbraith (Australia) David Macpherson
- Score: 6–3, 7–5

Details
- Draw: 16
- Seeds: 4

Events
Singles	Doubles
- Tennis Channel Open

Justin Gimelstob and Richey Reneberg were the defending champions, but Gimelstob did not participate this year. Reneberg partnered Jared Palmer, successfully defending his title.

Palmer and Reneberg defeated Patrick Galbraith and David Macpherson 6–3, 7–5 in the final.

== Seeds ==
1. (South Africa) Ellis Ferreira / (United States) Rick Leach (semifinals)
2. (Zimbabwe) Wayne Black / (Australia) Andrew Kratzmann (first round)
3. (South Africa) David Adams / (South Africa) John-Laffnie de Jager (first round)
4. (United States) Jeff Tarango / (Czech Republic) Daniel Vacek (semifinals)

== Draw ==
Key

- Q = Qualifier
- WC = Wild card
- LL = Lucky loser
- Alt = Alternate
- ITF = ITF entry
- PR = Protected ranking
- SR = Special ranking
- SE = Special exempt
- JE = Junior exempt
- JR = Junior Accelerator Programme entrant
- CO = College Accelerator Programme entrant
- NG = Next Gen Accelerator Program entrant
- w/o = Walkover
- r = Retired
- d = Defaulted

=== Draw ===
First round
1	(South Africa) E Ferreira (United States) R Leach	6	6
(South Africa) C Haggard (North Macedonia) A Kitinov	3	4
WC	(Spain) À Corretja (Chile) M Ríos	6	3	4
(South Africa) W Ferreira (United States) S Humphries	4	6	6
3	(South Africa) D Adams (South Africa) J-L de Jager	2	4
(The Bahamas) M Knowles (United States) B MacPhie	6	6
(Australia) J Eagle (Australia) A Florent	6^{5}	2
(United States) J Palmer (United States) R Reneberg	7^{7}	6
LL	(United States) B Bryan (United States) M Bryan	5	3
(South Africa) B Haygarth (South Africa) R Koenig	7	6
WC	(United States) L Jensen (United States) M Jensen	7^{7}	3	2
4	(United States) J Tarango (Czech Republic) D Vacek	6^{2}	6	6
(United States) P Galbraith (Australia) D Macpherson	7^{7}	7^{7}
Q	(United States) J Stark (United States) M Tebbutt	6^{4}	6^{4}
(United States) D Johnson (Czech Republic) C Suk	2	6	7
2	(Zimbabwe) W Black (Australia) A Kratzmann	6	4	5

Quarterfinals
1	(South Africa) E Ferreira (United States) R Leach	3	6	6
(South Africa) W Ferreira (United States) S Humphries	6	3	2
(The Bahamas) M Knowles (United States) B MacPhie	6	3	2
(United States) J Palmer (United States) R Reneberg	2	6	6
(South Africa) B Haygarth (South Africa) R Koenig	7^{7}	6^{1}	2
4	(United States) J Tarango (Czech Republic) D Vacek	6^{5}	7^{7}	6
(United States) P Galbraith (Australia) D Macpherson	4	6	7^{7}
(United States) D Johnson (Czech Republic) C Suk	6	3	6^{1}

Semifinals
1	(South Africa) E Ferreira (United States) R Leach	3	7	6^{4}
(United States) J Palmer (United States) R Reneberg	6	5	7^{7}
4	(United States) J Tarango (Czech Republic) D Vacek	3	6	5
(United States) P Galbraith (Australia) D Macpherson	6	3	7

Final
(United States) J Palmer (United States) R Reneberg	6	7
(United States) P Galbraith (Australia) D Macpherson	3	5
