= 1999 Franklin Templeton Tennis Classic =

- Date: March 1–8
- Edition: 12th
- Category: World Series
- Draw: 32S / 16D
- Prize money: $325,000
- Surface: Hard / outdoor
- Location: Scottsdale, Arizona, U.S.

Champions

Singles
- (United States) Jan-Michael Gambill

Doubles
- (United States) Justin Gimelstob / (United States) Richey Reneberg
← 1998 ·	Tennis Channel Open	· 2000 →

The 1999 Franklin Templeton Tennis Classic was an Association of Tennis Professionals men's tennis tournament held in Scottsdale, Arizona in the United States that was part of the ATP World Series of the 1999 ATP Tour. It was the 12th edition of the tournament and was held from March 1 to March 8, 1999. Unseeded Jan-Michael Gambill won the singles title.

== Finals ==
=== Singles ===
(United States) Jan-Michael Gambill defeated (Australia) Lleyton Hewitt, 7–6^{(7–2)}, 4–6, 6–4.

- It was Gambill's only title of the year and the 1st of his career.

=== Doubles ===
(United States) Justin Gimelstob / (United States) Richey Reneberg defeated (The Bahamas) Mark Knowles / (Australia) Sandon Stolle, 6–4, 6–7^{(4–7)}, 6–3.

- It was Gimelstob's 1st title of the year and the 3rd of his career. It was Reneberg's only title of the year and the 21st of his career.
