= 1997 Franklin Templeton Classic – Doubles =

Tennis tournament

Doubles
- 1997 Franklin Templeton Classic

Final
- Champions: (Argentina) Luis Lobo (Spain) Javier Sánchez
- Runners-up: (Sweden) Jonas Björkman (United States) Rick Leach
- Score: 6–3, 6–3

Details
- Draw: 16
- Seeds: 4

Events
Singles	Doubles
- Franklin Templeton Classic

Patrick Galbraith and Rick Leach were the defending champions but they competed with different partners that year, Galbraith with Alex O'Brien and Leach with Jonas Björkman.

Galbraith and O'Brien lost in the quarterfinals to Trevor Kronemann and David Macpherson.

Björkman and Leach lost in the final 6–3, 6–3 against Luis Lobo and Javier Sánchez.

== Seeds ==
1. (Zimbabwe) Byron Black / (Canada) Grant Connell (semifinals)
2. (United States) Patrick Galbraith / (United States) Alex O'Brien (quarterfinals)
3. (Sweden) Jonas Björkman / (United States) Rick Leach (final)
4. (Argentina) Luis Lobo / (Spain) Javier Sánchez (champions)

== Draw ==
Key

- Q = Qualifier
- WC = Wild card
- LL = Lucky loser
- Alt = Alternate
- ITF = ITF entry
- PR = Protected ranking
- SR = Special ranking
- SE = Special exempt
- JE = Junior exempt
- JR = Junior Accelerator Programme entrant
- CO = College Accelerator Programme entrant
- NG = Next Gen Accelerator Program entrant
- w/o = Walkover
- r = Retired
- d = Defaulted

First round
1	(Zimbabwe) B Black (Canada) G Connell	4	6	7
WC	(United States) L Jensen (United States) M Jensen	6	4	6
Q	(Zimbabwe) W Black (United States) B Shelton	3	6
(United States) T Ho (United States) J Waite	6	7
3	(Sweden) J Björkman (United States) R Leach	7	3	7
(South Africa) B Haygarth (United States) J Tarango	5	6	6
(Australia) J Eagle (Australia) A Florent	6	6
(United States) B MacPhie (South Africa) G Muller	2	4
WC	(Venezuela) N Pereira (United States) V Spadea	4	4
WC	(Mexico) L Lavalle (Venezuela) M Ruah	6	6
WC	(Australia) P Cash (Chile) M Ríos	2	2
4	(Argentina) L Lobo (Spain) J Sánchez	6	6
(United States) T Kronemann (Australia) D Macpherson	4	6	7
(United States) J Grabb (United States) R Reneberg	6	3	6
(Australia) S Stolle (Czech Republic) C Suk	2	5
2	(United States) P Galbraith (United States) A O'Brien	6	7

Quarterfinals
1	(Zimbabwe) B Black (Canada) G Connell	6	3	6
(United States) T Ho (United States) J Waite	1	6	1
3	(Sweden) J Björkman (United States) R Leach	6	6
(Australia) J Eagle (Australia) A Florent	4	3
WC	(Mexico) L Lavalle (Venezuela) M Ruah	6	3	4
4	(Argentina) L Lobo (Spain) J Sánchez	4	6	6
(United States) T Kronemann (Australia) D Macpherson	6	3	7
2	(United States) P Galbraith (United States) A O'Brien	4	6	5

Semifinals
1	(Zimbabwe) B Black (Canada) G Connell	6	2	3
3	(Sweden) J Björkman (United States) R Leach	3	6	6
4	(Argentina) L Lobo (Spain) J Sánchez	7	7
(United States) T Kronemann (Australia) D Macpherson	6	5

Final
3	(Sweden) J Björkman (United States) R Leach	3	3
4	(Argentina) L Lobo (Spain) J Sánchez	6	6
