= 1995 MassMutual Championships =

Tennis tournament held in Arizona

- Date: February 27 – March 6
- Edition: 8th
- Category: World Series
- Draw: 32S / 16D
- Prize money: $303,000
- Surface: Hard / outdoor
- Location: Scottsdale, US

Champions

Singles
- (United States) Jim Courier

Doubles
- (United States) Trevor Kronemann / (Australia) David Macpherson
← 1994 ·	Tennis Channel Open	· 1996 →

The 1995 MassMutual Championships, also known as the Arizona Tennis Championships, was a men's Association of Tennis Professionals tennis tournament held in Scottsdale, Arizona in the United States and played on outdoor hard courts. The event was part of the World Series of the 1995 ATP Tour. It was the eighth edition of the tournament and was held from February 27 through March 6, 1995. Second-seeded Jim Courier won the singles title.

== Finals ==
=== Singles ===
(United States) Jim Courier defeated (Australia) Mark Philippoussis 7–6^{(7–2)}, 6–4

- It was Courier's 2nd singles title of the year and the 16th of his career.

=== Doubles ===
(United States) Trevor Kronemann / (Australia) David Macpherson defeated (Argentina) Luis Lobo / (Spain) Javier Sánchez 4–6, 6–3, 6–4

- It was Kronemann's 1st title of the year and the 3rd of his career. It was Macpherson's 1st title of the year and the 9th of his career.
