= 2000 Franklin Templeton Tennis Classic =

2000 Tennis Channel Open
- Date: March 6–13
- Edition: 13th
- Category: International Series
- Draw: 32S / 16D
- Prize money: $350,000
- Surface: Hard / outdoor
- Location: Scottsdale, Arizona, U.S.

Champions

Singles
- (Australia) Lleyton Hewitt

Doubles
- (United States) Jared Palmer / (United States) Richey Reneberg
← 1999 ·	Tennis Channel Open	· 2001 →

The 2000 Franklin Templeton Tennis Classic was a men's Association of Tennis Professionals tennis tournament played on outdoor hard courts in Scottsdale, Arizona in the United States that was part of the International Series of the 2000 ATP Tour. It was the 13th edition of the tournament and was held from March 6 to March 13. Sixth-seeded Lleyton Hewitt won the singles title.

== Finals ==
=== Singles ===
(Australia) Lleyton Hewitt defeated (United Kingdom) Tim Henman 6–4, 7–6^{(7–2)}

- It was Hewitt's 3rd title of the year and the 5th of his career.

=== Doubles ===
(United States) Jared Palmer / (United States) Richey Reneberg defeated (United States) Patrick Galbraith / (Australia) David Macpherson 6–3, 7–5

- It was Palmer's 1st title of the year and the 15th of his career. It was Reneberg's only title of the year and the 22nd of his career.
