= 2000 Franklin Templeton Tennis Classic – Singles =

Tennis tournament

Singles
- 2000 Tennis Channel Open

Final
- Champion: (Australia) Lleyton Hewitt
- Runner-up: (United Kingdom) Tim Henman
- Score: 6–4, 7–6^{(7–2)}

Details
- Draw: 32
- Seeds: 8

Events
Singles	Doubles
← 1999 ·	Tennis Channel Open	· 2001 →

Jan-Michael Gambill was the defending champion, but did not participate this year.

Lleyton Hewitt won the title, defeating Tim Henman 6–4, 7–6^{(7–2)} in the final.

== Seeds ==
1. (United States) Andre Agassi (second round)
2. (United States) Pete Sampras (second round, withdrew)
3. (Chile) Marcelo Ríos (quarterfinals, retired)
4. (Ecuador) Nicolás Lapentti (quarterfinals)
5. (United Kingdom) Tim Henman (final)
6. (Australia) Lleyton Hewitt (champion)
7. (Spain) Álbert Costa (semifinals)
8. (Australia) Patrick Rafter (first round)

== Draw ==
=== Key ===
- Q = Qualifier
- WC = Wild card
- LL = Lucky loser
- Alt = Alternate
- ITF = ITF entry
- PR = Protected ranking
- SR = Special ranking
- SE = Special exempt
- JE = Junior exempt
- JR = Junior Accelerator Programme entrant
- CO = College Accelerator Programme entrant
- NG = Next Gen Accelerator Program entrant
- w/o = Walkover
- r = Retired
- d = Defaulted

=== Finals ===
Semifinals
(Spain) Juan Carlos Ferrero	4	2
6	(Australia) Lleyton Hewitt	6	6
5	(United Kingdom) Tim Henman	6	6
7	(Spain) Álbert Costa	3	3

Final
6	(Australia) Lleyton Hewitt	6	7^{7}
5	(United Kingdom) Tim Henman	4	6^{2}

=== Top half ===
First round
1	(United States) A Agassi	6	6
Q	(South Africa) M Ondruska	2	1
(Spain) F Clavet	6	6
(Brazil) F Meligeni	0	3
(Argentina) M Zabaleta	5	5
(Spain) C Moyà	7	7
(Spain) J C Ferrero	6	6
8	(Australia) P Rafter	4	2
3	(Chile) M Ríos	6	6
(United States) V Spadea	4	4
(Spain) A Martín	6	7
(France) S Grosjean	4	5
WC	(United States) C Woodruff	7	6
Q	(Czech Republic) S Doseděl	5	4
(Czech Republic) D Vacek	1	7^{7}	2
6	(Australia) L Hewitt	6	6^{3}	6

Second round
1	(United States) A Agassi	1	2
(Spain) F Clavet	6	6
(Spain) C Moyà	1	6^{5}
(Spain) J C Ferrero	6	7^{7}
3	(Chile) M Ríos	7^{9}	7^{7}
(Spain) A Martín	6^{7}	6^{3}
WC	(United States) C Woodruff	6	2	3
6	(Australia) L Hewitt	3	6	6

Quarterfinals
(Spain) F Clavet	4	6	3
(Spain) J C Ferrero	6	3	6
4	(Chile) M Ríos	6^{5}	2^{r}
6	(Australia) L Hewitt	7^{7}	4

Semifinals
(Spain) J C Ferrero	4	2
6	(Australia) L Hewitt	6	6

=== Bottom half ===
First round
5	(United Kingdom) T Henman	6	7^{7}
(Austria) S Koubek	3	6^{3}
(Morocco) K Alami	2	3
Q	(Zimbabwe) B Black	6	6
(Netherlands) S Schalken	7^{7}	4	4
Q	(South Africa) W Ferreira	6^{4}	6	6
(Australia) A Ilie	6	2	3
4	(Ecuador) N Lapentti	1	6	6
7	(Spain) Á Costa	6	6
SE	(United States) P Goldstein	3	1
(Romania) A Pavel	6	6
SE	(Spain) Á Calatrava	3	4
WC	(United States) J Blake	3	1
(Spain) À Corretja	6	6
(United Kingdom) G Rusedski	3	4
WC/2	(United States) P Sampras	6	6

Second round
5	(United Kingdom) T Henman	6	6
Q	(Zimbabwe) B Black	1	4
Q	(South Africa) W Ferreira	6^{4}	6	5
4	(Ecuador) N Lapentti	7^{7}	2	7
7	(Spain) Á Costa	6	6
(Romania) A Pavel	2	4
(Spain) À Corretja	w/o
WC/2	(United States) P Sampras

Quarterfinals
5	(United Kingdom) T Henman	6	6
4	(Ecuador) N Lapentti	3	2
7	(Spain) Á Costa	6	4	7^{8}
(Spain) À Corretja	2	6	6^{6}

Semifinals
5	(United Kingdom) T Henman	6	6
7	(Spain) Á Costa	3	3
