= 1999 Franklin Templeton Tennis Classic – Doubles =

Tennis tournament

Doubles
- 1999 Tennis Channel Open

Final
- Champions: (United States) Justin Gimelstob (United States) Richey Reneberg
- Runners-up: (The Bahamas) Mark Knowles (Australia) Sandon Stolle
- Score: 6–4, 6–7^{(4–7)}, 6–3

Details
- Draw: 16
- Seeds: 4

Events
Singles	Doubles
- Tennis Channel Open

Cyril Suk and Michael Tebbutt were the defending champions, but lost in the quarterfinals this year.

Justin Gimelstob and Richey Reneberg won the title, defeating Mark Knowles and Sandon Stolle 6–4, 6–7^{(4–7)}, 6–3 in the final.

== Seeds ==
1. (South Africa) Ellis Ferreira / (United States) Rick Leach (first round)
2. (The Bahamas) Mark Knowles / (Australia) Sandon Stolle (final)
3. (Australia) Joshua Eagle / (Australia) Patrick Rafter (first round)
4. (South Africa) David Adams / (South Africa) John-Laffnie de Jager (first round)

== Draw ==
Key

- Q = Qualifier
- WC = Wild card
- LL = Lucky loser
- Alt = Alternate
- ITF = ITF entry
- PR = Protected ranking
- SR = Special ranking
- SE = Special exempt
- JE = Junior exempt
- JR = Junior Accelerator Programme entrant
- CO = College Accelerator Programme entrant
- NG = Next Gen Accelerator Program entrant
- w/o = Walkover
- r = Retired
- d = Defaulted

=== Finals ===
First round
1	(South Africa) E Ferreira (United States) R Leach	6	6	6
(United States) J Gimelstob (United States) R Reneberg	1	7	7
(Czech Republic) C Suk (United States) M Tebbutt	2	6	6
(Argentina) P Albano (Argentina) D Orsanic	6	4	2
3	(Australia) J Eagle (Australia) P Rafter	3	7	2
LL	(South Africa) C Haggard (North Macedonia) A Kitinov	6	5	6
Q	(United States) J Palmer (Serbia and Montenegro) N Zimonjić	6	6
WC	(Australia) P Kilderry (Belgium) X Malisse	3	1
(Spain) F Roig (Spain) J Sánchez	7	4	4
WC	(United States) B Bryan (United States) M Bryan	6	6	6
(Czech Republic) J Novák (Czech Republic) D Rikl	7	3	7
4	(South Africa) D Adams (South Africa) J-L de Jager	6	6	5
WC	(Canada) J Robichaud (United States) C Woodruff	7	4	6
(Australia) A Florent (Australia) D Macpherson	6	6	7
(United States) D Johnson (Australia) P Tramacchi	6	7	6
2	(The Bahamas) M Knowles (Australia) S Stolle	7	6	7

Quarterfinals
(United States) J Gimelstob (United States) R Reneberg	7	6
(Czech Republic) C Suk (United States) M Tebbutt	6	2
LL	(South Africa) C Haggard (North Macedonia) A Kitinov	6	2
Q	(United States) J Palmer (Serbia and Montenegro) N Zimonjić	7	6
WC	(United States) B Bryan (United States) M Bryan	1	6	6
(Czech Republic) J Novák (Czech Republic) D Rikl	6	4	4
(Australia) A Florent (Australia) D Macpherson	5	6	4
2	(The Bahamas) M Knowles (Australia) S Stolle	7	4	6

Semifinals
(United States) J Gimelstob (United States) R Reneberg	6	6
Q	(United States) J Palmer (Serbia and Montenegro) N Zimonjić	3	3
WC	(United States) B Bryan (United States) M Bryan	2	6
2	(The Bahamas) M Knowles (Australia) S Stolle	6	7

Final
(United States) J Gimelstob (United States) R Reneberg	6	6^{4}	6
2	(The Bahamas) M Knowles (Australia) S Stolle	4	7^{7}	3
