= 1996 Franklin Templeton Classic =

- Date: March 4–10
- Edition: 9th
- Category: World Series
- Draw: 32S / 16D
- Prize money: $303,000
- Surface: Hard / outdoor
- Location: Scottsdale, Arizona, US

Champions

Singles
- (South Africa) Wayne Ferreira

Doubles
- (United States) Patrick Galbraith / (United States) Rick Leach
← 1995 ·	Tennis Channel Open	· 1997 →

The 1996 Franklin Templeton Classic, also known as the Arizona Tennis Championships, was a men's tennis tournament played on outdoor hard courts in Scottsdale, Arizona in the United States and was part of the World Series of the 1996 ATP Tour. It was the ninth edition of the tournament and was held from March 4 through March 10, 1996. First-seeded Wayne Ferreira won the singles title.

== Finals ==
=== Singles ===
(South Africa) Wayne Ferreira defeated (Chile) Marcelo Ríos 2–6, 6–3, 6–3

- It was Ferreira's 1st singles title of the year and the 12th of his career.

=== Doubles ===
(United States) Patrick Galbraith / (United States) Rick Leach defeated (United States) Richey Reneberg / (New Zealand) Brett Steven 5–7, 7–5, 7–5

- It was Galbraith's 1st title of the year and the 27th of his career. It was Leach's 2nd title of the year and the 35th of his career.
