= 1999 Franklin Templeton Tennis Classic – Singles =

Tennis tournament

Singles
- 1999 Tennis Channel Open

Final
- Champion: (United States) Jan-Michael Gambill
- Runner-up: (Australia) Lleyton Hewitt
- Score: 7–6^{(7–2)}, 4–6, 6–4

Details
- Draw: 32
- Seeds: 8

Events
Singles	Doubles
← 1998 ·	Tennis Channel Open	· 2000 →

Andre Agassi was the defending champion, but retired from his semifinals match this year.

Jan-Michael Gambill won the title, defeating Lleyton Hewitt 7–6^{(7–2)}, 4–6, 6–4 in the final.

== Seeds ==
1. (United States) Pete Sampras (second round)
2. (Australia) Patrick Rafter (second round)
3. (United States) Andre Agassi (semifinals, retired)
4. (Croatia) Goran Ivanišević (quarterfinals)
5. (Germany) Tommy Haas (first round)
6. (France) Cédric Pioline (quarterfinals)
7. (Austria) Thomas Muster (first round)
8. (Brazil) Gustavo Kuerten (first round)

== Draw ==
=== Key ===
- Q = Qualifier
- WC = Wild card
- LL = Lucky loser
- Alt = Alternate
- SE = Special exempt
- PR = Protected ranking
- ITF = ITF entry
- JE = Junior exempt
- w/o = Walkover
- r = Retired
- d = Defaulted
- SR = Special ranking

=== Finals ===
Semifinals
(United States) Jan-Michael Gambill	5
3	(United States) Andre Agassi	4^{r}
(Australia) Mark Woodforde	2	2
Q	(Australia) Lleyton Hewitt	6	6

Final
(United States) Jan-Michael Gambill	7^{7}	4	6
Q	(Australia) Lleyton Hewitt	6^{2}	6	4

=== Top half ===
First round
1	(United States) P Sampras	7^{7}	6
(Paraguay) R Delgado	6^{2}	2
(Argentina) F Squillari	6	3	4
(United States) J-M Gambill	3	6	6
(Australia) J Stoltenberg	6^{3}	5
(Spain) F Vicente	7^{7}	7
WC	(United States) J Gimelstob	6	7
7	(Austria) T Muster	4	5
3	(United States) A Agassi	3	7	6
(Brazil) F Meligeni	6	5	3
(Argentina) M Zabaleta	5	6	6
(Czech Republic) S Doseděl	7	2	2
WC	(United States) C Woodruff	3	6	6^{7}
(Australia) A Ilie	6	2	7^{9}
(Argentina) M Puerta	6^{6}	2
6	(France) C Pioline	7^{8}	6

Second round
1	(United States) P Sampras	6	3	4
(United States) J-M Gambill	4	6	6
(Spain) F Vicente	6^{5}	2
WC	(United States) J Gimelstob	7^{7}	6
3	(United States) A Agassi	6	6
(Argentina) M Zabaleta	2	0
(Australia) A Ilie	1	2
6	(France) C Pioline	6	6

Quarterfinals
(United States) J-M Gambill	4	6	6
WC	(United States) J Gimelstob	6	4	1
3	(United States) A Agassi	6	6
6	(France) C Pioline	4	1

Semifinals
(United States) J-M Gambill	5
3	(United States) A Agassi	4^{r}

=== Bottom half ===
First round
5	(Germany) T Haas	3	7	2
(Australia) M Woodforde	6	5	6
(Spain) F Clavet	6^{5}	6	6
(France) N Escudé	7^{7}	1	2
Q	(Argentina) H Gumy	3	7	6
(Netherlands) S Schalken	6	5	1
(Australia) S Draper	3	6	3
WC/4	(Croatia) G Ivanišević	6	3	6
8	(Brazil) G Kuerten	3	6	3
(France) J Golmard	6	3	6
Q	(Ecuador) N Lapentti	6	4	6
(Romania) A Pavel	3	6	1
Q	(Australia) L Hewitt	6	7
(Sweden) M Norman	3	5
Q	(United States) A O'Brien	3	4
2	(Australia) P Rafter	6	6

Second round
(Australia) M Woodforde	6	3	6
(Spain) F Clavet	3	6	1
Q	(Argentina) H Gumy	4	4
WC/4	(Croatia) G Ivanišević	6	6
(France) J Golmard	3
Q	(Ecuador) N Lapentti	5^{r}
Q	(Australia) L Hewitt	7^{7}	6
2	(Australia) P Rafter	6^{5}	1

Quarterfinals
(Australia) M Woodforde	7^{8}	4	6
WC/4	(Croatia) G Ivanišević	6^{6}	6	1
(France) J Golmard	1	0^{r}
Q	(Australia) L Hewitt	6	3

Semifinals
(Australia) M Woodforde	2	2
Q	(Australia) L Hewitt	6	6
