= 1995 MassMutual Championships – Singles =

Tennis tournament

Singles
- 1995 MassMutual Championships

Final
- Champion: (United States) Jim Courier
- Runner-up: (Australia) Mark Philippoussis
- Score: 7–6^{(7–2)}, 6–4

Details
- Draw: 32
- Seeds: 8

Events
Singles	Doubles
- Tennis Channel Open

Andre Agassi was the defending champion, but did not participate this year.

Jim Courier won the title, defeating Mark Philippoussis 7–6^{(7–2)}, 6–4 in the final.

== Seeds ==
1. (United States) Todd Martin (semifinals)
2. (United States) Jim Courier (champion)
3. (Sweden) Stefan Edberg (semifinals)
4. (Australia) Patrick Rafter (second round)
5. (United States) Aaron Krickstein (first round)
6. (Germany) Bernd Karbacher (second round)
7. (Spain) Javier Sánchez (first round)
8. (Australia) Mark Woodforde (quarterfinals)

== Draw ==
Key

- Q = Qualifier
- WC = Wild card
- LL = Lucky loser
- Alt = Alternate
- ITF = ITF entry
- PR = Protected ranking
- SR = Special ranking
- SE = Special exempt
- JE = Junior exempt
- JR = Junior Accelerator Programme entrant
- CO = College Accelerator Programme entrant
- NG = Next Gen Accelerator Program entrant
- w/o = Walkover
- r = Retired
- d = Defaulted

=== Finals ===
Semifinals
1	(United States) Todd Martin	6^{3}	3
Q	(Australia) Mark Philippoussis	7^{7}	6
WC/3	(Sweden) Stefan Edberg	4	7^{7}	4
2	(United States) Jim Courier	6	6^{5}	6

Final
Q	(Australia) Mark Philippoussis	6^{2}	4
2	(United States) Jim Courier	7^{7}	6

=== Top half ===
First round
1	(United States) T Martin	4	6	6
(Germany) M Zoecke	6	3	2
Q	(Canada) A Sznajder	6^{3}	2
(Zimbabwe) B Black	7^{7}	6
(France) F Santoro	3	2
Q	(Germany) C Arriens	6	6
(Australia) M Tebbutt	7^{7}	6^{3}	7^{8}
7	(Spain) J Sánchez	6^{4}	7^{7}	6^{6}
4	(Australia) P Rafter	6	6
(Austria) G Schaller	3	4
(Uruguay) M Filippini	3	1
(Sweden) J Björkman	6	6
Q	(Australia) M Philippoussis	6	6
(United States) V Spadea	2	1
(Russia) A Chesnokov	7^{7}	6
5	(United States) A Krickstein	6^{4}	2

Second round
1	(United States) T Martin	7^{7}	6
(Zimbabwe) B Black	6^{3}	1
(Germany) C Arriens	2	6	6
(Australia) M Tebbutt	6	3	3
4	(Australia) P Rafter	2	3
(Sweden) J Björkman	6	6
Q	(Australia) M Philippoussis	6	6
(Russia) A Chesnokov	4	3

Quarterfinals
1	(United States) T Martin	7	7^{7}
(Germany) C Arriens	5	6^{1}
(Sweden) J Björkman	6	4	4
Q	(Australia) M Philippoussis	3	6	6

Semifinals
1	(United States) T Martin	6^{3}	3
Q	(Australia) M Philippoussis	7^{7}	6

=== Bottom half ===
First round
6	(Germany) B Karbacher	6	6
(Australia) R Fromberg	2	1
(New Zealand) B Steven	7^{7}	7^{7}
(Sweden) H Holm	6^{3}	6^{4}
Q	(Germany) M Geserer	6^{2}	6	6
(The Bahamas) R Smith	7^{7}	2	2
(Germany) H Dreekmann	5	6	4
WC/3	(Sweden) S Edberg	7	3	6
8	(Australia) M Woodforde	6	6
(Austria) H Skoff	3	4
WC	(United States) W McGuire	1	6	6
WC	(United States) D Schmid	6	3	4
LL	(United States) B Dunn	4	4
(Italy) R Furlan	6	6
(France) L Roux	6^{2}	4
2	(United States) J Courier	7^{7}	6

Second round
6	(Germany) B Karbacher	1	4
(New Zealand) B Steven	6	6
Q	(Germany) M Geserer	1	1
WC/3	(Sweden) S Edberg	6	6
8	(Australia) M Woodforde	6	1
WC	(United States) W McGuire	4	0^{r}
(Italy) R Furlan	3	4
2	(United States) J Courier	6	6

Quarterfinals
(New Zealand) B Steven	3	2
WC/3	(Sweden) S Edberg	6	6
8	(Australia) M Woodforde	3	3
2	(United States) J Courier	6	6

Semifinals
WC/3	(Sweden) S Edberg	4	7^{7}	4
2	(United States) J Courier	6	6^{5}	6
