= 1998 Franklin Templeton Tennis Classic =

- Date: March 2–9
- Edition: 11th
- Category: World Series
- Draw: 32S / 16D
- Prize money: $315,000
- Surface: Hard / outdoor
- Location: Scottsdale, Arizona, U.S.

Champions

Singles
- (United States) Andre Agassi

Doubles
- (Czech Republic) Cyril Suk / (Australia) Michael Tebbutt
- Tennis Channel Open

The 1998 Franklin Templeton Tennis Classic was a men's tennis tournament played on outdoor hard courts in Scottsdale, Arizona in the United States that was part of the International Series of the 1998 ATP Tour. It was the 11th edition of the tournament and was held from March 2 through March 9, 1998. Unseeded Andre Agassi, who entered the competition on a wildcard, won the singles title, his third at the event after 1993 and 1994.

== Finals ==
=== Singles ===
(United States) Andre Agassi defeated (Australia) Jason Stoltenberg 6–4, 7–6^{(7–3)}

- It was Agassi's 2nd title of the year and the 37th of his career.

=== Doubles ===
(Czech Republic) Cyril Suk / (Australia) Michael Tebbutt defeated (United States) Kent Kinnear / (United States) David Wheaton 4–6, 6–1, 7–6

- It was Suk's 1st title of the year and the 18th of his career. It was Tebbutt's only title of the year and the 2nd of his career.
