= 1997 Franklin Templeton Classic – Singles =

Tennis tournament

Singles
- 1997 Franklin Templeton Classic

Final
- Champion: (Australia) Mark Philippoussis
- Runner-up: (United States) Richey Reneberg
- Score: 6–4, 7–6^{(7–4)}

Details
- Draw: 32
- Seeds: 8

Events
Singles	Doubles
- Franklin Templeton Classic

Wayne Ferreira was the defending champion but lost in the first round to Jérôme Golmard.

Mark Philippoussis won in the final 6–4, 7–6^{(7–4)} against Richey Reneberg.

== Seeds ==
1. (Chile) Marcelo Ríos (first round)
2. (South Africa) Wayne Ferreira (first round)
3. (Spain) Carlos Moyá (quarterfinals)
4. (Spain) Albert Costa (quarterfinals)
5. (United States) Andre Agassi (first round)
6. (Spain) Alberto Berasategui (first round)
7. (United States) MaliVai Washington (first round)
8. (United States) Richey Reneberg (final)

== Draw ==
Key

- Q = Qualifier
- WC = Wild card
- LL = Lucky loser
- Alt = Alternate
- ITF = ITF entry
- PR = Protected ranking
- SR = Special ranking
- SE = Special exempt
- JE = Junior exempt
- JR = Junior Accelerator Programme entrant
- CO = College Accelerator Programme entrant
- NG = Next Gen Accelerator Program entrant
- w/o = Walkover
- r = Retired
- d = Defaulted

=== Finals ===
Semifinals
(Australia) Mark Philippoussis	4	7^{7}	6
(United States) Chris Woodruff	6	6^{5}	2
(Sweden) Jonas Björkman	3	3
8	(United States) Richey Reneberg	6	6

Final
(Australia) Mark Philippoussis	6	7^{7}
8	(United States) Richey Reneberg	4	6^{4}

=== Top half ===
First round
1	(Chile) M Ríos	1	6	6^{5}
(Zimbabwe) B Black	6	4	7^{7}
(Australia) S Stolle	6	6
(Spain) F Clavet	3	1
WC	(Germany) T Haas	6	3	4
(Australia) M Philippoussis	2	6	6
LL	(United States) B Shelton	3	7	6
7	(United States) M Washington	6	5	2
3	(Spain) C Moyá	3	6	7^{7}
(Sweden) M Tillström	6	2	6^{2}
Q	(Venezuela) N Pereira	4	7^{7}	3
(Norway) C Ruud	6	6^{5}	6
Q	(United States) J Tarango	6^{4}	2
(United States) C Woodruff	7^{7}	6
(Spain) J Sánchez	6	6
5	(United States) A Agassi	3	2

Second round
(Zimbabwe) B Black	6	5	7
(Australia) S Stolle	4	7	5
(Australia) M Philippoussis	6	6
LL	(United States) B Shelton	4	1
3	(Spain) C Moyá	4	6	7^{7}
(Norway) C Ruud	6	4	6^{1}
(United States) C Woodruff	4	6	7^{7}
(Spain) J Sánchez	6	3	6^{4}

Quarterfinals
(Zimbabwe) B Black	5	3
(Australia) M Philippoussis	7	6
3	(Spain) C Moyá	6^{8}	7	3
(United States) C Woodruff	7^{10}	5	6

Semifinals
(Australia) M Philippoussis	4	7^{7}	6
(United States) C Woodruff	6	6^{5}	2

=== Bottom half ===
First round
6	(Spain) A Berasategui	3	1
(Australia) P Rafter	6	6
(United States) A O'Brien	4	6	5
(Sweden) J Björkman	6	1	7
SE	(Spain) S Bruguera	0	6	6
(Australia) J Stoltenberg	6	4	1
(Germany) M-K Goellner	4	6^{2}
4	(Spain) A Costa	6	7^{7}
8	(United States) R Reneberg	7^{7}	0	6
(United States) V Spadea	6^{1}	6	1
WC	(Sweden) M Larsson	3	7	4
(Argentina) H Gumy	6	5	6
Q	(Mexico) L Lavalle	6^{3}	6	3
(Ukraine) A Medvedev	7^{7}	3	6
Q	(France) J Golmard	4	6	6
2	(South Africa) W Ferreira	6	3	2

Second round
(Australia) P Rafter	6	1	6^{2}
(Sweden) J Björkman	3	6	7^{7}
SE	(Spain) S Bruguera	4	7^{7}	5
4	(Spain) A Costa	6	6^{5}	7
8	(United States) R Reneberg	2	6	6
(Argentina) H Gumy	6	1	2
(Ukraine) A Medvedev	6^{6}	6	4
Q	(France) J Golmard	7^{8}	3	6

Quarterfinals
(Sweden) J Björkman	6	2	6
4	(Spain) A Costa	4	6	4
8	(United States) R Reneberg	6	6
Q	(France) J Golmard	4	2

Semifinals
(Sweden) J Björkman	3	3
8	(United States) R Reneberg	6	6
