= Mark Philippoussis =

Australian tennis player (born 1976)

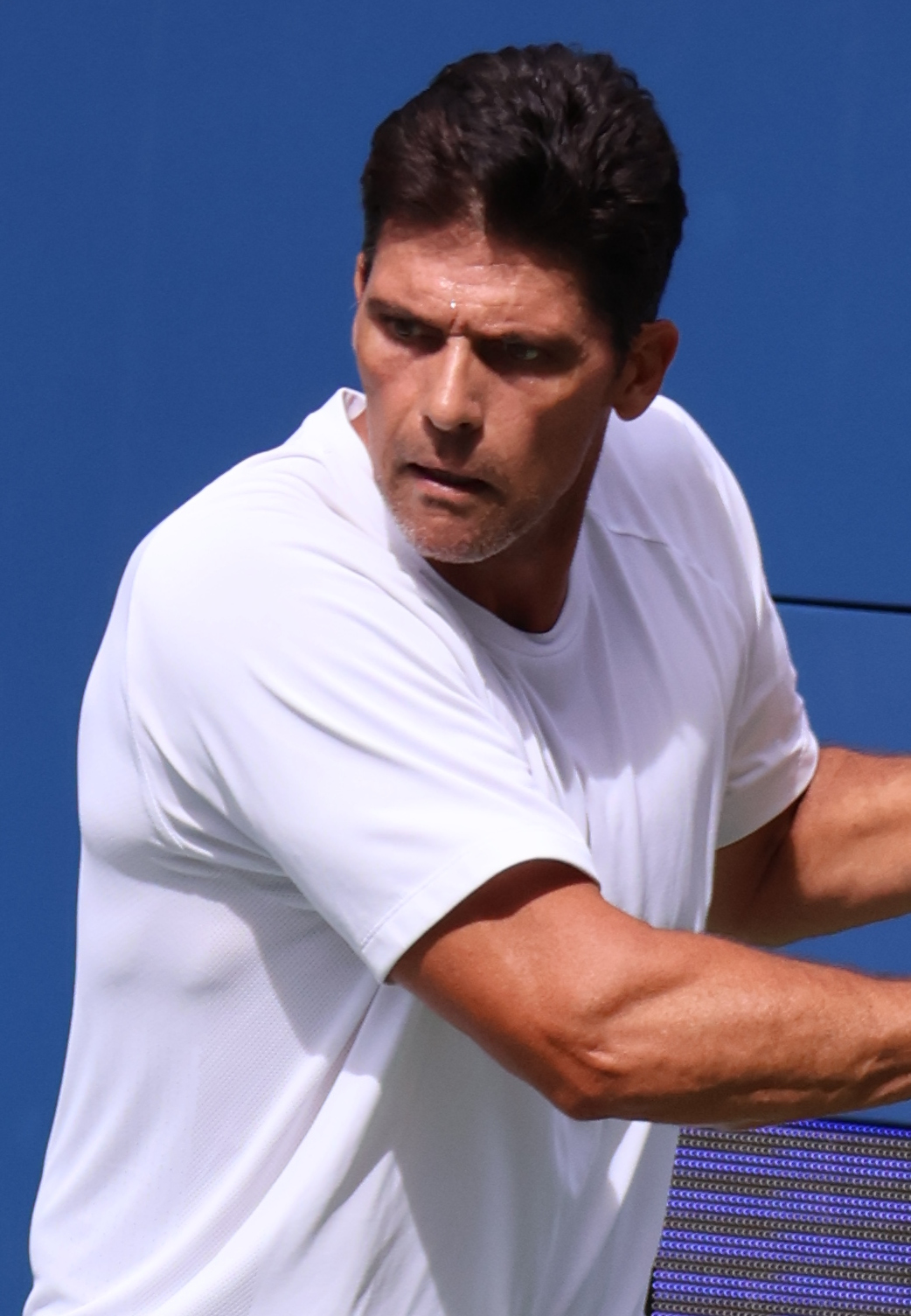
- Philippoussis in 2023
- Country (sports): Australia
- Residence: Melbourne, Victoria, Australia
- Born: 7 November 1976 (age 50) Melbourne, Victoria, Australia
- Height: 196 cm (6 ft 5 in)
- Turned pro: 1994
- Retired: 2008 (last match 2015)
- Plays: Right-handed (one-handed backhand)
- Prize money: US$ 6,987,402

Singles
- Career record: 313–204 (60.5%)
- Career titles: 11
- Highest ranking: No. 8 (19 April 1999)

Grand Slam singles results
- Australian Open: 4R (1996, 1999, 2000, 2004)
- French Open: 4R (1997, 2000)
- Wimbledon: F (2003)
- US Open: F (1998)

Other tournaments
- Tour Finals: Alt (2003)
- Grand Slam Cup: SF (1998)
- Olympic Games: 3R (1996, 2000)

Doubles
- Career record: 99–73 (57.6%)
- Career titles: 3
- Highest ranking: No. 18 (11 August 1997)

Grand Slam doubles results
- Australian Open: 2R (1996)
- French Open: 3R (1996, 1997)
- Wimbledon: SF (1996)
- US Open: SF (1996)

Mixed doubles
- Career record: 3–3
- Career titles: 0

Grand Slam mixed doubles results
- French Open: QF (1996)
- US Open: 2R (1997)

Team competitions
- Davis Cup: W (1999, 2003)
- Hopman Cup: W (1999)

Mark Anthony Philippoussis (born 7 November 1976) is an Australian tennis coach, commentator and former professional tennis player of Greek and Italian descent. Philippoussis' greatest achievements are winning two Davis Cup titles with Australia in 1999 and 2003, winning the deciding rubber in the final of each. He also reached the final of the 1998 US Open and the 2003 Wimbledon singles tournaments. Philippoussis reached a career-high singles ranking of world No. 8.

Philippoussis has had a minor career in modelling and starred in the American reality television dating show Age of Love. He is nicknamed 'the Scud', after the Scud missile. He is also known in Australia as "The Pou".

== Background ==
Mark Philippoussis (Greek: Μαρκ Φιλιππούσης, /ˌfɪlɪˈpuːsɪs/ FIL-ih-POO-sis) was born in Melbourne to a Greek father, Nikolaos ("Nick"), and an Italian mother, Rossana; and was educated at Maribyrnong College and later at Wesley College. He is of the Catholic faith.

== Career ==
=== Beginnings ===
Coached by his father, Nick, the right-hander has played tennis since he was six years of age. He was an Australian Institute of Sport scholarship holder. He was briefly coached by former 1987 Wimbledon champion Pat Cash, which ended in an acrimonious split in 2000. In 1994, he finished third in singles ranking for juniors. Philippoussis also finished as junior doubles champion with Ben Ellwood in Australia, Wimbledon, and Italy. He turned professional in 1994.

In 1995, at the age of 19, he was the youngest player in the year-end top 50. In 1996, he reached the 4th round of the Australian Open upsetting Pete Sampras in the 3rd round and in doubles with Patrick Rafter. On 25 May 1997, he recorded a personal best 229.0 km/h (142.3 mph) serve in a game he lost to Albert Costa. During the height of his career, Philippoussis was known as having one of the fastest serves in the game.

=== Rise to top 10 ===
At the 1998 US Open U.S. Open, Philippoussis reached his first Grand Slam final, losing to fellow Australian Patrick Rafter in four sets. In January 1999, Philippoussis and Jelena Dokić won the Hopman Cup for Australia, defeating Sweden's Åsa Carlsson and Jonas Björkman in the final tie. This was the first time that Australia won the Hopman Cup and the only time until Nick Kyrgios and Daria Gavrilova won in January 2016.

In March 1999, Mark Philippoussis defeated Carlos Moyá in five sets in the final of Indian Wells Masters. On 29 March 1999, Philippoussis entered the top 10 for the first time and stayed there for 10 weeks. He advanced to the quarter-finals at Wimbledon in 1999 for the second straight year, where he retired in the second set against Sampras after having won the first set. During that match, Philippoussis suffered a moderate cartilage tear in his left knee and underwent arthroscopic surgery four days later. Sampras later remarked that he "dodged a bullet out there". Philippoussis returned to professional tennis seven weeks later at the Indianapolis Tennis Championships and lost his second-round match after receiving a bye in the first round. He did not play again until October in Singapore, where he lost in the second round. He finished 1999 at No. 19.

2000 was the fourth consecutive year in which Philippoussis finished in the top 20, at No. 11. He reached the fourth round at the Australian Open, losing to eventual champion Andre Agassi. He defeated No. 2 Sampras 8–6 in the fifth set at the French Open in a first-round match, but lost in the fourth round to Juan Carlos Ferrero. For the third consecutive year, he made it to the quarterfinals at Wimbledon, losing again to Agassi. He appeared in his second Olympic Games in Sydney, losing in the third round to eventual gold medalist Yevgeny Kafelnikov.

Philippoussis finished 2002 in the top 100 (seventh time in eight years), despite not winning a title. He moved from Miami to the San Diego area in September 2002.

=== Davis Cup ===
Philippoussis has always claimed to be proud of representing his country in Davis Cup, but personal differences with John Newcombe and Tony Roche interfered with his commitment early in his career. Despite several highly publicised feuds, Philippoussis played a large part in giving Australia their 27th Davis Cup triumph—second only to the United States with 31—but it was their first since 1986. In 1999 he defeated Cédric Pioline, in four sets in Nice, France.

Injuries plagued Philippoussis's availability for Davis Cup and was the cause of a public rift between team-mates Patrick Rafter and Lleyton Hewitt. Rafter publicly accused Philippoussis of jerking the team around after he withdrew from a Davis Cup tie in late 2000. Philippoussis said Rafter was ill-informed and upset by the lack of support and understanding from his team-mates.

Knee surgeries forced Philippoussis out of Davis Cup until February 2003. By then, Pat Rafter had retired, and John Fitzgerald and Wally Masur were the new Davis Cup captain and coach. Philippoussis sealed victory for Australia in the Melbourne Final against Spain. Philippoussis beat Spain's Juan Carlos Ferrero in a five set battle. Philippoussis suffered a pectoral tear at the end of the second set, which caused him to lose the third and fourth sets. He regrouped in the fifth set and beat Ferrero 6–0.

=== 2003–2005: Comeback ===
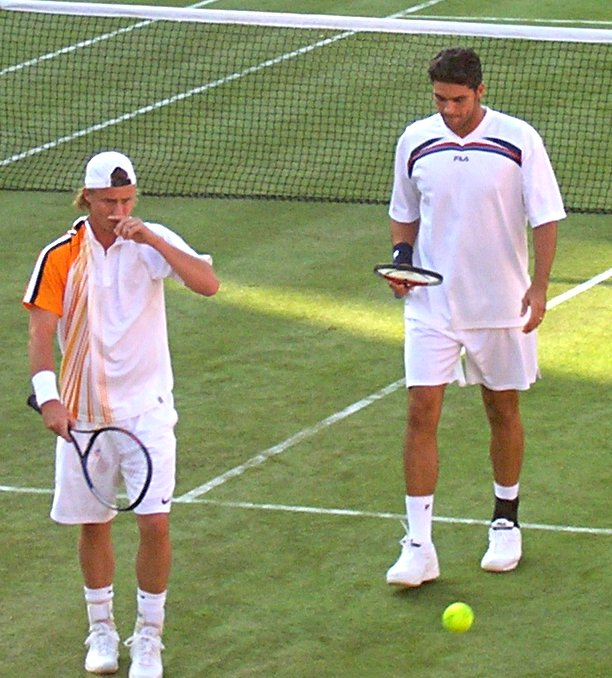
Philippoussis in a doubles match with Lleyton Hewitt in 2005.

After three knee operations, Philippoussis embarked on a protracted comeback. He made himself available regularly for Davis Cup, hired a new physical trainer, and took up surfing as his new recreation. He made the 2003 Wimbledon final, losing to Roger Federer in straight sets.

During a 2003 Wimbledon tennis match against Andre Agassi, he set a new Australian tennis record of 46 aces served in a match, three aces short of the overall ATP Tour record then held by Richard Krajicek.

Philippoussis broke a two-year singles-title drought by winning the Shanghai Open in 2003. On 30 November 2003, he defeated Juan Carlos Ferrero of Spain to win the fourth match of the Davis Cup final in Melbourne, securing the title for Australia. At the end of 2003, Philippoussis received the ATP Comeback Player of the Year award.

The honeymoon period with the Australian public, however, did not last. 2004 proved a disastrous year in terms of his tennis career and public profile. After shouldering most of the blame for losing Australia's Davis Cup tie with Sweden with an unexpected below-par performance, Philippoussis struggled through to the Wimbledon fourth round in June 2004. From Wimbledon in June until the end of the season in October, he failed to win a single ATP tennis match and finished with one of his lowest rankings since turning professional in 1994.

In October 2004, a much-publicised affair with Delta Goodrem had soured and seriously damaged his standing, after newspapers alleged that he had dated Paris Hilton while with Goodrem. In March 2005, he became engaged to actress and model Alexis Barbara. The Age reported the pair had split in July 2006, but Philippoussis denied this to Australian tabloid New Idea; they did split some time before he began filming Age of Love.

=== 2006: Return ===
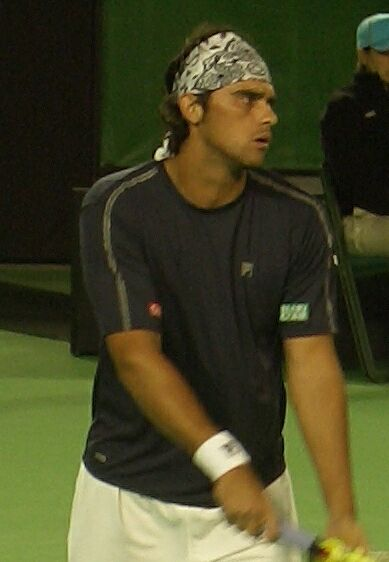
At the 2006 Australian Open

After some controversy over his wildcard selection after a disappointing 2006 Australian Open, Philippoussis made more headlines when he again earned entry into the 2006 Wimbledon. He was defeated in the second round.

Leading into the Campbell's Hall of Fame Championships as a wildcard, his record was a modest 6–7. He had a fantastic run in the tournament, getting to the final, where he defeated Justin Gimelstob in straight sets to claim his first title in almost three years.

He confirmed to Sydney's Daily Telegraph on 23 August 2006, that he "parted ways with" his father as his coach and rehired Peter McNamara in an attempt to revive his career.

Philippoussis, then ranked No. 114, lost to Rafael Nadal as a wildcard entry in the first round of the 2006 US Open. The Australian Davis Cup team lost against Argentina in an unpredictable 5–0. On 22 September, Philippoussis was defeated by David Nalbandian in the first match of the series.

Philippoussis played in a series of Challenger tournaments after the Davis Cup semifinals. Philippoussis won the Calabasas tournament, defeating Amer Delic in the final.

=== 2007-2012 ===
Philippoussis beat Russian Dmitry Tursunov at the 2007 Hopman Cup. However, during his second match against Jérôme Haehnel, he was forced to retire after hyperextending his knee. An MRI showed that he had torn cartilage in his knee, forcing him to miss the rest of the season.

In 2008 Philippoussis acquired a protected ranking of No. 119 and was allowed to use that ranking for entry into eight tournaments. Tennis Australia, not being happy with his lack of matchplay and unwillingness to play the Australian Open wildcard playoff, told him that he would not be given any special treatment and would have to earn his wildcard. This forced him to use one of his protected ranking tournament entries.

In 2010 Philippousis appeared in a pro tour match for the first time since November 2006, when he lost to fifth seed Michael Yani in the first round of the Challenger of Dallas. Philippousis also competed in some of the events on the Champions Series, winning two tournaments and topping the rankings for 2010.

Philippoussis has played for the Philadelphia Freedoms of World Team Tennis in 2012. The Freedoms used the No. 1 overall pick to draft Philippoussis, who previously played for the team in 2002. He was the team's marquee player on 25 July 2012 when they faced the Boston Lobsters and travelled with the team to their matches against the Sacramento Capitals and Orange County Breakers.

=== 2015: Return to ATP World Tour ===
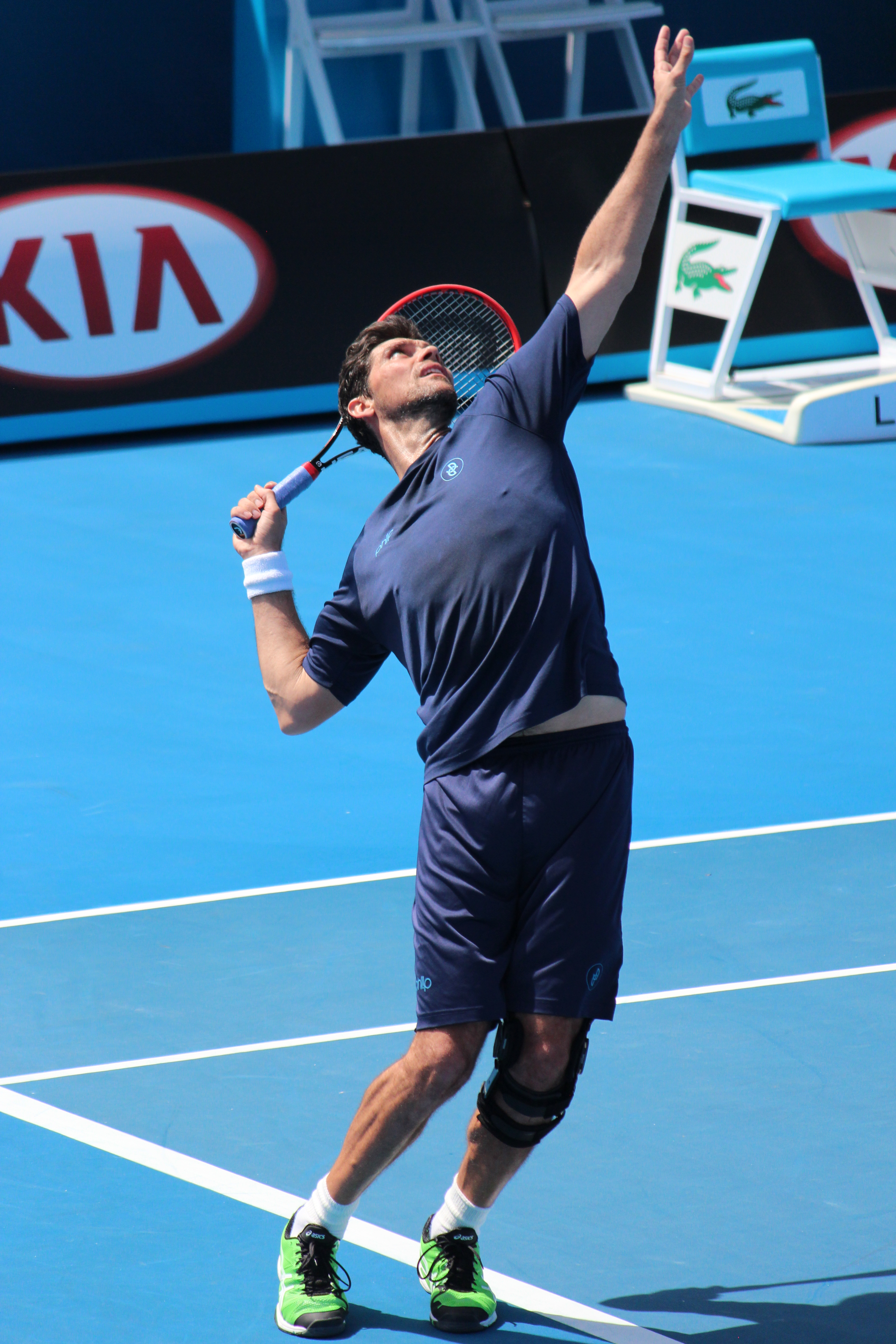
Philippoussis at the 2015 Australian Open

Philippoussis contested his first match on the ATP World Tour in nine years since winning the 2006 Newport title, after receiving a wild card into the qualifying rounds of the 2015 Hall of Fame Tennis Championships at 38 years of age. He lost to Eric Quigley 6–7^{(1–7)}, 6–7^{(4–7)}. Philippoussis also played doubles in the tournament with Ryan Harrison, winning the first round to make it to the quarter-finals before losing to the second seeds Austin Krajicek and Rajeev Ram. Afterwards, Philippousis said: "It was just about playing one event. There's no talk about a comeback. Down the line if I see something, maybe close to California, I might do that. It's one event and that's it."

=== 2017 ===
Philippoussis won the 2017 RPIA Championships in Toronto, defeating Andy Roddick in the finals.

== Equipment ==
In the early 2000s, Philippoussis wore apparel manufactured by Fila on court, and used Dunlop 200G racquet.

== Television ==
In 2020, Philippoussis competed as the 'Echidna' in the second season of The Masked Singer Australia and was the first contestant eliminated, placing 12th overall.

=== Age of Love ===
Philippoussis starred as the bachelor in the reality television dating show Age of Love on the NBC television network, in June 2007.

The show centred around women in or near their 40s and women in their 20s competing for his affection. At first Philippoussis, unaware of the special format of the show, was shocked at the ages of the "cougars" as the older women were called. He was shocked again after learning he would also be dating younger women ("kittens"). The final dates occurred in his hometown of Melbourne, Australia, including a date at Moonlit Sanctuary. In the end, Philippoussis chose Amanda Salinas (the 25-year-old Nashville Predators dancer) because it "wouldn't work out" with Jen, the 48-year-old assistant to Jerry Buss.

== Personal life ==
In 2004, he began a nine-month relationship with Australian singer Delta Goodrem. Her "comeback" single, "Out of the Blue", was written about his support during her cancer battle. The couple's relationship ended in controversy when newspapers reported Philippoussis had been unfaithful with famed American socialite Paris Hilton.

In May 2009, Philippoussis declared that all his money was gone and that he would lose his home of residence. In a writ lodged with the Supreme Court on 15 May 2009, it was alleged Philippoussis took out a loan through his company Mergis Pty Ltd which he personally guaranteed. The writ claims Mergis – of which Philippoussis is the sole director, secretary and shareholder – defaulted less than a year later. The lender is seeking $1,313,351.96, plus interest, costs and possession of the house, or is threatening to go to trial. The Perpetual Trustee Company Ltd is listed in court documents as the plaintiff, but a company spokesman said her firm had provided funds to another company which was the one foreclosing. The other company is not detailed on the writ, but Philippoussis said it was Pepper Home Loans – a company that provides loans through mortgage brokers. Philippoussis took out a mortgage in February 2008. He said he was three months behind, adding that each monthly payment was more than $10,000. "I haven't played tennis since 2006, and tennis is one of those sports where if you don't play, you don't get paid", he said. In September 2009, his father Nick Philippoussis – a tennis coach and accused sex offender – also faced the threat of bankruptcy over financial institution debts.

Later in 2009, while in the US attempting to restart his tennis career, he dated and was engaged to actress Jennifer Esposito but the engagement ended a year later.

Philippoussis' former stepmother is Yan Cui.

He married Romanian-born model Silvana Lovin in September 2013. Lovin gave birth to their first child, a boy, in 2014, and had their second child, a girl, in 2018.

In July 2023, Philippoussis was fined US$10,000 by the International Tennis Integrity Agency for breaching betting sponsorship rules.

== Major finals ==
=== Grand Slam finals ===
==== Singles: 2 (2 runner-ups) ====
| Result | Year | Championship | Surface | Opponent | Score |
|---|---|---|---|---|---|
| Loss | 1998 | US Open | Hard | (Australia) Patrick Rafter | 3–6, 6–3, 2–6, 0–6 |
| Loss | 2003 | Wimbledon | Grass | (Switzerland) Roger Federer | 6–7^{(5–7)}, 2–6, 6–7^{(3–7)} |

=== Masters Series finals ===
==== Singles: 2 (1 title, 1 runner-up) ====
| Result | Year | Tournament | Surface | Opponent | Score |
|---|---|---|---|---|---|
| Win | 1999 | Indian Wells, US | Hard | (Spain) Carlos Moyá | 5–7, 6–4, 6–4, 4–6, 6–2 |
| Loss | 2000 | Paris, France | Carpet | (Russia) Marat Safin | 6–3, 6–7^{(7–9)}, 4–6, 6–3, 6–7^{(8–10)} |

== Career finals ==
=== Singles: 22 (11 titles, 11 runner-ups) ===
| Legend Grand Slam (0–2) Tennis Masters Cup (0–0) ATP Masters Series (1–1) ATP Championship Series (2–1) ATP International Series (8–7) | Titles by surface Hard (8–7) Grass (2–1) Clay (1–0) Carpet (0–3) |

| Result | W/L | Date | Tournament | Surface | Opponent | Score |
|---|---|---|---|---|---|---|
| Loss | 1. | Mar 1995 | Scottsdale, US | Hard | (United States) Jim Courier | 6–7^{(2–7)}, 4–6 |
| Loss | 2. | Oct 1995 | Kuala Lumpur, Malaysia | Carpet | (Chile) Marcelo Ríos | 6–7^{(6–8)}, 2–6 |
| Loss | 3. | Oct 1995 | Tokyo, Japan | Hard (i) | (United States) Michael Chang | 3–6, 4–6 |
| Win | 1. | Oct 1996 | Toulouse, France | Hard | (Sweden) Magnus Larsson | 6–1, 5–7, 6–4 |
| Win | 2. | Mar 1997 | Scottsdale, US | Hard | (United States) Richey Reneberg | 6–4, 7–6^{(7–4)} |
| Win | 3. | Apr 1997 | Munich, Germany | Clay | (Spain) Àlex Corretja | 7–6^{(7–3)}, 1–6, 6–4 |
| Win | 4. | Jun 1997 | London (Queens), UK | Grass | (Croatia) Goran Ivanišević | 7–5, 6–3 |
| Loss | 4. | Sep 1997 | Toulouse, France | Hard (i) | (Germany) Nicolas Kiefer | 5–7, 7–5, 4–6 |
| Loss | 5. | Oct 1997 | Basel, Switzerland | Carpet | (United Kingdom) Greg Rusedski | 3–6, 6–7^{(6–8)}, 6–7^{(3–7)} |
| Win | 5. | Feb 1998 | Memphis, US | Hard (i) | (United States) Michael Chang | 6–3, 6–2 |
| Loss | 6. | Sep 1998 | US Open, New York City, US | Hard | (Australia) Patrick Rafter | 3–6, 6–3, 2–6, 0–6 |
| Win | 6. | Feb 1999 | San Jose, US | Hard (i) | (United States) Cecil Mamiit | 6–3, 6–2 |
| Win | 7. | Mar 1999 | Indian Wells, US | Hard | (Spain) Carlos Moyá | 5–7, 6–4, 6–4, 4–6, 6–2 |
| Win | 8. | Feb 2000 | San Jose, US | Hard (i) | (Sweden) Mikael Tillström | 7–5, 4–6, 6–3 |
| Loss | 7. | Oct 2000 | Hong Kong, China | Hard | (Germany) Nicolas Kiefer | 6–7^{(4–7)}, 6–2, 2–6 |
| Loss | 8. | Nov 2000 | Paris, France | Carpet | (Russia) Marat Safin | 6–3, 6–7^{(7–9)}, 4–6, 6–3, 6–7^{(8–10)} |
| Win | 9. | Feb 2001 | Memphis, US | Hard (i) | (Italy) Davide Sanguinetti | 6–3, 6–7^{(5–7)}, 6–3 |
| Loss | 9. | Jan 2002 | Adelaide, Australia | Hard | (United Kingdom) Tim Henman | 4–6, 7–6^{(8–6)}, 3–6 |
| Loss | 10. | Mar 2003 | Scottsdale, US | Hard | (Australia) Lleyton Hewitt | 4–6, 4–6 |
| Loss | 11. | Jul 2003 | Wimbledon, London, UK | Grass | (Switzerland) Roger Federer | 6–7^{(5–7)}, 2–6, 6–7^{(3–7)} |
| Win | 10. | Sep 2003 | Shanghai, China | Hard | (Czech Republic) Jiří Novák | 6–2, 6–1 |
| Win | 11. | Jul 2006 | Newport, US | Grass | (United States) Justin Gimelstob | 6–3, 7–5 |

=== Doubles: 6 (3 titles, 3 runner-ups) ===
| Legend Grand Slam (0–0) Tennis Masters Cup (0–0) ATP Masters Series (0–2) ATP Championship Series (0–0) ATP International Series (3–1) | Titles by surface Hard (1–3) Grass (1–0) Clay (0–0) Carpet (1–0) |

| Result | W/L | Date | Tournament | Surface | Partner | Opponents | Score |
|---|---|---|---|---|---|---|---|
| Win | 1. | Apr 1995 | Hong Kong, China | Hard | (United States) Tommy Ho | (Australia) John Fitzgerald (Sweden) Anders Järryd | 6–1, 6–7^{(2–7)}, 7–6^{(7–3)} |
| Win | 2. | Oct 1995 | Kuala Lumpur, Malaysia | Carpet | (United States) Patrick McEnroe | (Canada) Grant Connell (United States) Patrick Galbraith | 7–5, 6–4 |
| Loss | 1. | Mar 1997 | Indian Wells, US | Hard | (Australia) Patrick Rafter | (The Bahamas) Mark Knowles (Canada) Daniel Nestor | 7–5, 6–4 |
| Win | 3. | Jun 1997 | London (Queens), UK | Grass | (Australia) Patrick Rafter | (Australia) Sandon Stolle (Czech Republic) Cyril Suk | 6–2, 4–6, 7–5 |
| Loss | 2. | Aug 1997 | Cincinnati, US | Hard | (Australia) Patrick Rafter | (Australia) Todd Woodbridge (Australia) Mark Woodforde | 6–4, 6–2 |
| Loss | 3. | Mar 2003 | Scottsdale, US | Hard | (Australia) Lleyton Hewitt | (United States) James Blake (The Bahamas) Mark Merklein | 6–4, 6–7^{(2–7)}, 7–6^{(7–5)} |

=== Team competition: 3 (3 titles) ===
| Result | No. | Date | Tournament | Surface | Partner | Opponents | Score |
|---|---|---|---|---|---|---|---|
| Win | 1. | Jan 1999 | Hopman Cup, Perth, Western Australia | Hard (i) | (Australia) Jelena Dokić | (Sweden) Åsa Carlsson (Sweden) Jonas Björkman | 2–1 |
| Win | 2. | Dec 1999 | Davis Cup, Nice, France | Clay (i) | (Australia) Lleyton Hewitt (Australia) Todd Woodbridge (Australia) Mark Woodforde | (France) Sébastien Grosjean (France) Fabrice Santoro (France) Cédric Pioline (France) Olivier Delaître | 3–2 |
| Win | 3. | Nov 2003 | Davis Cup, Melbourne, Australia | Grass | (Australia) Lleyton Hewitt (Australia) Wayne Arthurs (Australia) Todd Woodbridge | (Spain) Juan Carlos Ferrero (Spain) Carlos Moyá (Spain) Àlex Corretja (Spain) Feliciano López | 3–1 |

== Performance timeline ==
Key
| W | F | SF | QF | #R | RR | Q# | DNQ | A | NH |

(W) winner; (F) finalist; (SF) semifinalist; (QF) quarterfinalist; (#R) rounds 4, 3, 2, 1; (RR) round-robin stage; (Q#) qualification round; (DNQ) did not qualify; (A) absent; (NH) not held; (SR) strike rate (events won / competed); (W–L) win–loss record.

=== Singles ===
| Tournament | 1993 | 1994 | 1995 | 1996 | 1997 | 1998 | 1999 | 2000 | 2001 | 2002 | 2003 | 2004 | 2005 | 2006 | Career SR | Career W-L |
|---|---|---|---|---|---|---|---|---|---|---|---|---|---|---|---|---|
Grand Slam tournaments
| Australian Open | Q1 | 1R | 1R | 4R | A | 2R | 4R | 4R | A | 2R | 3R | 4R | A | 1R | 0 / 10 | 16–10 |
| French Open | A | A | A | 2R | 4R | 2R | 1R | 4R | A | 2R | 2R | 1R | A | A | 0 / 8 | 10–8 |
| Wimbledon | A | Q3 | A | 2R | 1R | QF | QF | QF | A | 4R | F | 4R | 2R | 2R | 0 / 10 | 27–10 |
| US Open | A | Q2 | 3R | 4R | 3R | F | A | 2R | A | 1R | 3R | 1R | 1R | 1R | 0 / 10 | 16–10 |
| Grand Slam SR | 0 / 0 | 0 / 1 | 0 / 2 | 0 / 4 | 0 / 3 | 0 / 4 | 0 / 3 | 0 / 4 | 0 / 0 | 0 / 4 | 0 / 4 | 0 / 4 | 0 / 2 | 0 / 3 | 0 / 38 | N/A |
| Grand Slam win–loss | 0–0 | 0–1 | 2–2 | 8–4 | 5–3 | 12–4 | 7–3 | 11–4 | 0–0 | 5–4 | 11–4 | 6–4 | 1–2 | 1–3 | N/A | 69–38 |
Year-end championships
| Grand Slam Cup | Did not qualify | | | | | SF | WNI | Not Held | | | | | | | 0 / 1 | 1–1 |
ATP Masters Series
| Indian Wells | A | A | A | 2R | QF | 1R | W | SF | 1R | A | 2R | 2R | 1R | 1R | 1 / 10 | 15–9 |
| Miami | A | A | 3R | 2R | 4R | 2R | 3R | 4R | 3R | 2R | 4R | 2R | 2R | 2R | 0 / 12 | 14–11 |
| Monte Carlo | A | A | A | 2R | 3R | 3R | QF | 1R | A | 1R | A | A | A | A | 0 / 6 | 7–6 |
| Hamburg | A | Q1 | A | A | A | A | A | 1R | A | 1R | QF | 1R | A | A | 0 / 4 | 3–4 |
| Rome | A | A | 1R | 3R | 1R | 1R | 1R | 2R | A | 2R | 1R | 1R | A | A | 0 / 9 | 4–9 |
| Canada | A | Q1 | 2R | QF | QF | 3R | A | 1R | A | A | A | A | A | A | 0 / 5 | 8–5 |
| Cincinnati | A | Q2 | A | 1R | 1R | 2R | A | 3R | A | 2R | 1R | A | A | A | 0 / 6 | 4–6 |
| Madrid^{1} | A | A | 1R | 1R | 1R | 2R | 2R | 3R | 2R | A | 2R | A | A | A | 0 / 8 | 4–8 |
| Paris | A | A | A | 2R | A | QF | QF | F | 2R | A | 2R | A | A | A | 0 / 6 | 12–6 |
| Win–loss | 0–0 | 0–0 | 3–4 | 8–8 | 9–7 | 9–8 | 13–5 | 14–9 | 3–4 | 3–5 | 7–7 | 0–4 | 1–1 | 1–2 | 1 / 66 | 71–64 |
| Year-end ranking | 437 | 274 | 38 | 30 | 18 | 15 | 19 | 11 | 104 | 80 | 9 | 109 | 171 | 114 | N/A | |

^{1}This event was held in Stockholm through 1994, Essen in 1995, and Stuttgart from 1996 through 2001.

== Top 10 wins ==
| Season | 1993 | 1994 | 1995 | 1996 | 1997 | 1998 | 1999 | 2000 | 2001 | 2002 | 2003 | 2004 | 2005 | 2006 | Total |
| Wins | 0 | 0 | 0 | 2 | 6 | 6 | 3 | 3 | 0 | 0 | 4 | 0 | 0 | 0 | 24 |

| # | Player | Rank | Event | Surface | Rd | Score |
1996
| 1. | (United States) Pete Sampras | 1 | Australian Open, Melbourne, Australia | Hard | 3R | 6–4, 7–6^{(11–9)}, 7–6^{(7–3)} |
| 2. | (United States) Jim Courier | 9 | New Haven, United States | Hard | 3R | 7–6^{(7–5)}, 7–6^{(7–3)} |
1997
| 3. | (Spain) Carlos Moyá | 9 | Indian Wells, United States | Hard | 3R | 6–4, 6–3 |
| 4. | (South Africa) Wayne Ferreira | 10 | Miami, United States | Hard | 3R | 6–3, 6–3 |
| 5. | (United States) Pete Sampras | 1 | World Team Cup, Düsseldorf, Germany | Clay | RR | 4–6, 6–4, 0–1, ret. |
| 6. | (Croatia) Goran Ivanišević | 4 | World Team Cup, Düsseldorf, Germany | Clay | RR | 6–1, 6–2 |
| 7. | (Croatia) Goran Ivanišević | 3 | Queen's Club, London, United Kingdom | Grass | F | 7–5, 6–3 |
| 8. | (Russia) Yevgeny Kafelnikov | 4 | Basel, Switzerland | Carpet (i) | QF | 6–3, 6–7^{(5–7)}, 6–2 |
1998
| 9. | (Chile) Marcelo Ríos | 7 | Memphis, United States | Hard (i) | SF | 6–4, 7–6^{(7–5)} |
| 10. | (United States) Michael Chang | 5 | Memphis, United States | Hard (i) | F | 6–3, 6–2 |
| 11. | (Sweden) Jonas Björkman | 7 | World Team Cup, Düsseldorf, Germany | Clay | RR | 6–3, 6–4 |
| 12. | (Russia) Yevgeny Kafelnikov | 7 | Wimbledon, London, United Kingdom | Grass | 1R | 6–7^{(5–7)}, 7–6^{(7–1)}, 6–4, 6–2 |
| 13. | (Spain) Carlos Moyá | 10 | US Open, New York, United States | Hard | SF | 6–1, 6–4, 5–7, 6–4 |
| 14. | (Slovakia) Karol Kučera | 7 | Paris, France | Carpet (i) | 3R | 6–4, 4–6, 7–5 |
1999
| 15. | (Spain) Àlex Corretja | 3 | Indian Wells, United States | Hard | 2R | 4–6, 7–5, 6–2 |
| 16. | (Spain) Carlos Moyá | 4 | Indian Wells, United States | Hard | F | 5–7, 6–4, 6–4, 4–6, 6–2 |
| 17. | (United Kingdom) Tim Henman | 10 | Paris, France | Carpet (i) | 3R | 6–1, 3–6, 6–3 |
2000
| 18. | (United States) Pete Sampras | 2 | French Open, Paris, France | Clay | 1R | 4–6, 7–5, 7–6^{(7–4)}, 4–6, 8–6 |
| 19. | (Russia) Yevgeny Kafelnikov | 5 | Paris, France | Carpet (i) | 3R | 6–4, 6–2 |
| 20. | (Brazil) Gustavo Kuerten | 3 | Paris, France | Carpet (i) | SF | 7–6^{(7–5)}, 7–6^{(13–11)} |
2003
| 21. | (Argentina) David Nalbandian | 10 | Scottsdale, United States | Hard | QF | 0–6, 6–3, 6–4 |
| 22. | (Switzerland) Roger Federer | 5 | Hamburg, Germany | Clay | 3R | 6–3, 2–6, 6–3 |
| 23. | (United States) Andre Agassi | 1 | Wimbledon, London, United Kingdom | Grass | 4R | 6–3, 2–6, 6–7^{(4–7)}, 6–3, 6–4 |
| 24. | (Spain) Juan Carlos Ferrero | 3 | Davis Cup, Melbourne, Australia | Grass | RR | 7–5, 6–3, 1–6, 2–6, 6–0 |

Awards and achievements
| Preceded by (Spain) Albert Costa | ATP Newcomer of the Year; 1995 | Succeeded by (Slovakia) Dominik Hrbatý |
| Preceded by (Netherlands) Richard Krajicek | ATP Comeback Player of the Year; 2003 | Succeeded by (Germany) Tommy Haas |
