= Patrick Galbraith =

American tennis player

Personal details
- Born: April 16, 1967 (age 59) Tacoma, Washington, U.S.
- Education: University of California, Los Angeles (BA)
- Tennis career
- Country (sports): United States
- Height: 1.83 m (6 ft 0 in)
- Turned pro: 1989
- Retired: 1999
- Plays: Left-handed
- Prize money: $2,684,136

Singles
- Career record: 6–7
- Career titles: 0
- Highest ranking: No. 411 (June 25, 1990)

Doubles
- Career record: 455–256
- Career titles: 36
- Highest ranking: No. 1 (October 18, 1993)

Grand Slam doubles results
- Australian Open: SF (1996)
- French Open: SF (1994)
- Wimbledon: F (1993, 1994)
- US Open: SF (1990, 1995)

Grand Slam mixed doubles results
- Australian Open: QF (1997, 1998)
- French Open: RU (1997)
- Wimbledon: QF (1993, 1996)
- US Open: W (1994, 1996)
- Last updated on: July 9, 2019.

Patrick Galbraith (born April 16, 1967) is an American former doubles world No. 1 tennis player.

== Career ==
A doubles specialist, Galbraith reached the world No. 1 doubles ranking in 1993. During his career he won 38 top-level doubles titles. He was a mixed doubles champion at the US Open in 1994 (partnering Elna Reinach) and 1996 (partnering Lisa Raymond). He also won the men's doubles title at the ATP Tour World Championships in 1995 (partnering Grant Connell). He was a men's doubles runner-up at Wimbledon in both 1993 and 1994, and a mixed doubles runner-up at French Open in 1997. He retired from the professional tour in 1999, having won prize money totalling US$2,684,136.

Prior to turning professional, Galbraith played tennis for UCLA from 1986 to 1989, where he was a three-time All-American and an NCAA doubles champion in 1988.

In November 2018 Gabraith was elected as chairman of the board and president of the United States Tennis Association (USTA), succeeding Katrina Adams.

== Career finals ==
=== Doubles: 55 (36 titles / 19 runner-ups) ===
Titles by category Grand Slam (0) Tennis Masters Cup (1) ATP Masters Series (5) ATP Championship Series (8) Grand Prix / ATP Tour (22)	Titles by surface Hard (17) Clay (4) Grass (4) Carpet (11)

Result	W-L	Date	Tournament	Surface	Partner	Opponents	Score
Win	1–0	Jul 1989	Newport, U.S.	Grass	(United States) Brian Garrow	(United Kingdom) Neil Broad (South Africa) Stefan Kruger	2–6, 7–5, 6–3
Win	2–0	Feb 1990	Toronto Indoor, Canada	Carpet	(Australia) David Macpherson	(United Kingdom) Neil Broad (United States) Kevin Curren	3–6, 6–3, 6–4
Loss	2–1	Oct 1990	Berlin, Germany	Carpet	(United States) Kevin Curren	(South Africa) Pieter Aldrich (South Africa) Danie Visser	6–7, 6–7
Win	3–1	Oct 1990	Lyon, France	Carpet	(United States) Kelly Jones	(United States) Jim Grabb (United States) David Pate	7–6, 6–4
Win	4–1	Mar 1991	Rotterdam, Netherlands	Carpet	(Sweden) Anders Järryd	(United States) Steve DeVries (Australia) David Macpherson	7–6, 6–2
Win	5–1	Apr 1991	Hong Kong	Hard	(United States) Todd Witsken	(Canada) Glenn Michibata (United States) Robert Van't Hof	6–2, 6–4
Win	6–1	May 1991	Munich, Germany	Clay	(United States) Todd Witsken	(Sweden) Anders Järryd (South Africa) Danie Visser	7–5, 6–4
Win	7–1	Jul 1991	Montreal, Canada	Hard	(United States) Todd Witsken	(Canada) Grant Connell (Canada) Glenn Michibata	6–4, 3–6, 6–1
Win	8–1	Apr 1992	Nice, France	Clay	(United States) Scott Melville	(South Africa) Pieter Aldrich (South Africa) Danie Visser	6–1, 3–6, 6–4
Win	9–1	May 1992	Madrid, Spain	Clay	(United States) Patrick McEnroe	(Spain) Francisco Clavet (Spain) Carlos Costa	6–3, 6–2
Win	10–1	Jun 1992	Manchester, England	Grass	(Australia) David Macpherson	(United Kingdom) Jeremy Bates (Australia) Laurie Warder	4–6, 6–3, 6–2
Win	11–1	Jul 1992	Toronto, Canada	Hard	(South Africa) Danie Visser	(United States) Andre Agassi (United States) John McEnroe	6–4, 6–4
Win	12–1	Aug 1992	Los Angeles, U.S.	Hard	(United States) Jim Pugh	(United States) Francisco Montana (United States) David Wheaton	7–6, 7–6
Loss	12–2	Nov 1992	Paris Indoor, France	Carpet	(South Africa) Danie Visser	(United States) John McEnroe (United States) Patrick McEnroe	4–6, 2–6
Win	13–2	Jan 1993	Auckland, New Zealand	Hard	(Canada) Grant Connell	(Austria) Alex Antonitsch (Russia) Alexander Volkov	6–3, 7–6
Loss	13–3	Feb 1993	Dubai, UAE	Hard	(Canada) Grant Connell	(Australia) John Fitzgerald (Sweden) Anders Järryd	2–6, 1–6
Loss	13–4	May 1993	Hamburg, Germany	Clay	(Canada) Grant Connell	(Netherlands) Paul Haarhuis (Netherlands) Mark Koevermans	4–6, 7–6, 6–7
Loss	13–5	Jul 1993	Wimbledon, London	Grass	(Canada) Grant Connell	(Australia) Todd Woodbridge (Australia) Mark Woodforde	5–7, 3–6, 6–7^{(4)}
Loss	13–6	Jul 1993	Washington D.C., U.S.	Hard	(Canada) Grant Connell	(Zimbabwe) Byron Black (United States) Rick Leach	4–6, 5–7
Win	14–6	Oct 1993	Tokyo Indoor, Japan	Carpet	(Canada) Grant Connell	(United States) Luke Jensen (United States) Murphy Jensen	6–3, 6–4
Win	15–6	Nov 1993	Antwerp, Belgium	Carpet	(Canada) Grant Connell	(South Africa) Wayne Ferreira (Spain) Javier Sánchez	6–3, 7–6
Loss	15–7	Jan 1994	Auckland, New Zealand	Hard	(Canada) Grant Connell	(United States) Patrick McEnroe (United States) Jared Palmer	2–6, 6–4, 4–6
Loss	15–8	Feb 1994	Stuttgart Indoor, Germany	Carpet	(Canada) Grant Connell	(South Africa) David Adams (Russia) Andrei Olhovskiy	7–6, 4–6, 6–7
Win	16–8	Mar 1994	Indian Wells, U.S.	Hard	(Canada) Grant Connell	(Zimbabwe) Byron Black (United States) Jonathan Stark	7–5, 6–3
Loss	16–9	Jul 1994	Wimbledon, London	Grass	(Canada) Grant Connell	(Australia) Todd Woodbridge (Australia) Mark Woodforde	6–7, 3–6, 1–6
Win	17–9	Jul 1994	Washington D.C., U.S.	Hard	(Canada) Grant Connell	(Sweden) Jonas Björkman (Switzerland) Jakob Hlasek	6–4, 4–6, 6–3
Win	18–9	Aug 1994	New Haven, U.S.	Hard	(Canada) Grant Connell	(Netherlands) Jacco Eltingh (Netherlands) Paul Haarhuis	6–3, 7–6
Win	19–9	Oct 1994	Tokyo Indoor, Japan	Carpet	(Canada) Grant Connell	(Zimbabwe) Byron Black (United States) Jonathan Stark	6–3, 3–6, 6–4
Win	20–9	Jan 1995	Auckland, New Zealand	Hard	(Canada) Grant Connell	(Argentina) Luis Lobo (Spain) Javier Sánchez	6–4, 6–3
Win	21–9	Feb 1995	Dubai, UAE	Hard	(Canada) Grant Connell	(Spain) Tomás Carbonell (Spain) Francisco Roig	6–2, 4–6, 6–3
Win	22–9	Feb 1995	Stuttgart Indoor, Germany	Carpet	(Canada) Grant Connell	(Czech Republic) Cyril Suk (Czech Republic) Daniel Vacek	6–2, 6–2
Loss	22–10	Jun 1995	Nottingham, England	Grass	(South Africa) Danie Visser	(United States) Luke Jensen (United States) Murphy Jensen	3–6, 7–5, 4–6
Loss	22–11	Oct 1995	Kuala Lumpur, Malaysia	Carpet	(Canada) Grant Connell	(United States) Patrick McEnroe (Australia) Mark Philippoussis	5–7, 4–6
Win	23–11	Nov 1995	Paris Indoor, France	Carpet	(Canada) Grant Connell	(United States) Jim Grabb (United States) Todd Martin	6–2, 6–2
Loss	23–12	Nov 1995	Stockholm, Sweden	Hard (i)	(Canada) Grant Connell	(Netherlands) Jacco Eltingh (Netherlands) Paul Haarhuis	6–3, 2–6, 6–7
Win	24–12	Nov 1995	Doubles Championships, Eindhoven	Carpet	(Canada) Grant Connell	(Netherlands) Jacco Eltingh (Netherlands) Paul Haarhuis	7–6, 7–6, 3–6, 7–6
Win	25–12	Mar 1996	Scottsdale, U.S.	Hard	(United States) Rick Leach	(United States) Richey Reneberg (New Zealand) Brett Steven	5–7, 7–5, 7–5
Loss	25–13	Apr 1996	Key Biscayne, U.S.	Hard	(South Africa) Ellis Ferreira	(Australia) Todd Woodbridge (Australia) Mark Woodforde	1–6, 3–6
Win	26–13	Apr 1996	Hong Kong	Hard	(Russia) Andrei Olhovskiy	(United States) Kent Kinnear (United States) Dave Randall	6–3, 6–7, 7–6
Win	27–13	Aug 1996	Toronto, Canada	Hard	(Netherlands) Paul Haarhuis	(The Bahamas) Mark Knowles (Canada) Daniel Nestor	7–6, 6–3
Win	28–13	Nov 1996	Stockholm, Sweden	Hard (i)	(United States) Jonathan Stark	(United States) Todd Martin (United States) Chris Woodruff	7–6, 6–4
Win	29–13	Jan 1997	Auckland, New Zealand	Hard	(South Africa) Ellis Ferreira	(United States) Rick Leach (United States) Jonathan Stark	6–4, 4–6, 7–6
Win	30–13	Feb 1997	Memphis, U.S.	Hard (i)	(South Africa) Ellis Ferreira	(United States) Rick Leach (United States) Jonathan Stark	6–3, 3–6, 6–1
Loss	30–14	Mar 1997	Philadelphia, U.S.	Hard (i)	(South Africa) Ellis Ferreira	(Canada) Sébastien Lareau (United States) Alex O'Brien	3–6, 3–6
Win	31–14	Jun 1997	Nottingham, England	Grass	(South Africa) Ellis Ferreira	(United Kingdom) Danny Sapsford (United Kingdom) Chris Wilkinson	4–6, 7–6, 7–6
Win	32–14	Oct 1997	Vienna, Austria	Carpet	(South Africa) Ellis Ferreira	(Germany) Marc-Kevin Goellner (Germany) David Prinosil	6–3, 6–4
Win	33–14	Oct 1997	Lyon, France	Carpet	(South Africa) Ellis Ferreira	(France) Olivier Delaître (France) Fabrice Santoro	3–6, 6–2, 6–4
Loss	33–15	Nov 1997	Stockholm, U.S.	Hard (i)	(South Africa) Ellis Ferreira	(Germany) Marc-Kevin Goellner (United States) Richey Reneberg	3–6, 6–3, 6–7
Win	34–15	Jan 1998	Auckland, New Zealand	Hard	(New Zealand) Brett Steven	(Czech Republic) Tom Nijssen (United States) Jeff Tarango	6–4, 6–2
Loss	34–16	Jul 1998	Washington D.C., U.S.	Hard	(South Africa) Wayne Ferreira	(South Africa) Grant Stafford (Zimbabwe) Kevin Ullyett	2–6, 4–6
Loss	34–17	Jan 1999	Adelaide, Australia	Hard	(United States) Jim Courier	(Brazil) Gustavo Kuerten (Ecuador) Nicolás Lapentti	4–6, 4–6
Loss	34–18	Jan 1999	Sydney, Australia	Hard	(Netherlands) Paul Haarhuis	(Canada) Sébastien Lareau (Canada) Daniel Nestor	3–6, 4–6
Win	35–18	May 1999	Atlanta, U.S.	Clay	(United States) Justin Gimelstob	(Australia) Todd Woodbridge (Australia) Mark Woodforde	5–7, 7–6, 6–3
Win	36–18	Jun 1999	Nottingham, England	Grass	(United States) Justin Gimelstob	(South Africa) Marius Barnard (South Africa) Brent Haygarth	5–7, 7–5, 6–3
Loss	36–19	Mar 2000	Scottsdale, U.S.	Hard	(Australia) David Macpherson	(United States) Jared Palmer (United States) Richey Reneberg	3–6, 5–7

== Doubles performance timeline ==
Key
W	F	SF	QF	#R	RR	Q#	DNQ	A	NH

(W) winner; (F) finalist; (SF) semifinalist; (QF) quarterfinalist; (#R) rounds 4, 3, 2, 1; (RR) round-robin stage; (Q#) qualification round; (DNQ) did not qualify; (A) absent; (NH) not held; (SR) strike rate (events won / competed); (W–L) win–loss record.

Tournament	1987	1988	1989	1990	1991	1992	1993	1994	1995	1996	1997	1998	1999	2000	Career SR	Career win–loss
Grand Slam tournaments
Australian Open	A	A	A	1R	2R	1R	2R	1R	2R	SF	QF	QF	QF	1R	0 / 11	16–11
French Open	A	A	A	1R	1R	3R	1R	SF	2R	2R	2R	QF	1R	1R	0 / 11	12–11
Wimbledon	A	A	A	2R	QF	2R	F	F	1R	3R	3R	QF	3R	2R	0 / 11	25–11
U.S. Open	A	1R	3R	SF	2R	3R	2R	1R	SF	2R	1R	1R	A	2R	0 / 12	16–12
Grand Slam SR	0 / 0	0 / 1	0 / 1	0 / 4	0 / 4	0 / 4	0 / 4	0 / 4	0 / 4	0 / 4	0 / 4	0 / 4	0 / 3	0 / 4	0 / 45	N/A
Annual win–loss	0–0	0–1	2–1	5–4	5–4	5–4	7–4	9–4	6–4	8–4	6–4	9–4	5–3	2–4	N/A	69–45
ATP Masters Series
Indian Wells	NM1 Before 1990			QF	QF	2R	2R	W	QF	1R	2R	2R	QF	2R	1 / 11	15–10
Miami	NM1 Before 1990			A	1R	2R	2R	2R	SF	F	2R	3R	2R	SF	0 / 10	12–10
Monte Carlo	NM1 Before 1990			2R	SF	2R	2R	QF	2R	A	QF	A	A	1R	0 / 8	6–8
Rome	NM1 Before 1990			1R	A	1R	1R	1R	2R	SF	2R	QF	A	1R	0 / 9	7–9
Hamburg	NM1 Before 1990			A	QF	QF	F	2R	QF	SF	SF	A	A	1R	0 / 8	12–8
Canada	NM1 Before 1990			A	W	W	SF	2R	SF	W	2R	2R	A	A	3 / 8	18–5
Cincinnati	NM1 Before 1990			2R	2R	QF	SF	QF	QF	2R	QF	1R	A	1R	0 / 10	10–10
Stuttgart (Stockholm)	NM1 Before 1990			QF	SF	2R	SF	2R	SF	2R	2R	A	A	A	0 / 8	8–8
Paris	NM1 Before 1990			2R	SF	F	QF	SF	W	1R	SF	A	A	A	1 / 8	15–7
Masters Series SR	N/A			0 / 6	1 / 8	1 / 9	0 / 9	1 / 9	1 / 9	1 / 8	0 / 9	0 / 5	0 / 2	0 / 6	5 / 80	N/A
Annual win–loss	N/A			6–6	13–7	16–8	12–9	9–8	13–8	15–7	7–9	5–5	2–2	5–6	N/A	103–75
Year-end ranking	740	508	69	20	9	13	2	7	6	10	9	28	50	73	N/A	
