= Trevor Kronemann =

American tennis player

- Country (sports): United States
- Born: September 2, 1968 (age 56); Edina, Minnesota, United States
- Turned pro: 1987
- Retired: 1998 (as a player)

Singles
- Career record: 0–1
- Career titles: 0

Doubles
- Career record: 141–135
- Career titles: 6

Coaching career (2007–)
- Newport Beach Breakers 2007–

Coaching awards and records
- Awards 2010 Big West Coach of the Year,

Trevor Kronemann (born September 3, 1968) is a former professional tennis player from the United States.

Kronemann enjoyed most of his tennis success while playing doubles. During his career, he won six doubles titles and finished as a runner-up five times. He achieved a career-high doubles ranking of World No. 19 in 1995.

== Career finals ==
=== Doubles: 11 (6 wins, 5 losses) ===
Result	W-L	Year	Tournament	Surface	Partner	Opponents	Score
Win	1–0	1992	Tampa, US	Clay	(United States) Mike Briggs	(Brazil) Luiz Mattar (Russia) Andrei Olhovskiy	7–6, 6–7, 6–4
Win	2–0	1993	Charlotte, U.S.	Clay	(Sweden) Rikard Bergh	(Argentina) Javier Frana (Mexico) Leonardo Lavalle	6–1, 6–2
Loss	2–1	1994	Manchester, England	Grass	(United States) Scott Davis	(United States) Rick Leach (South Africa) Danie Visser	4–6, 6–4, 6–7
Loss	2–2	1995	Sydney Outdoor, Australia	Hard	(Australia) David Macpherson	(Australia) Todd Woodbridge (Australia) Mark Woodforde	6–7, 4–6
Win	3–2	1995	Scottsdale, U.S.	Hard	(Australia) David Macpherson	(Argentina) Luis Lobo (Spain) Javier Sánchez	4–6, 6–3, 6–4
Win	4–2	1995	Barcelona, Spain	Clay	(Australia) David Macpherson	(Croatia) Goran Ivanišević (Italy) Andrea Gaudenzi	6–2, 6–4
Win	5–2	1995	Munich, Germany	Clay	(Australia) David Macpherson	(Argentina) Luis Lobo (Spain) Javier Sánchez	6–3, 6–4
Win	6–2	1996	San Jose, U.S.	Hard (i)	(Australia) David Macpherson	(United States) Richey Reneberg (United States) Jonathan Stark	6–4, 3–6, 6–3
Loss	6–3	1996	Gstaad, Switzerland	Clay	(Australia) David Macpherson	(Argentina) Luis Lobo (Spain) Javier Sánchez	6–4, 6–7, 6–7
Loss	6–4	1997	Rosmalen, Netherlands	Grass	(Australia) David Macpherson	(Netherlands) Jacco Eltingh (Netherlands) Paul Haarhuis	4–6, 5–7
Loss	6–5	1997	Gstaad, Switzerland	Clay	(Australia) David Macpherson	(Russia) Yevgeny Kafelnikov (Czech Republic) Daniel Vacek	6–4, 6–7, 3–6

== Doubles performance timeline ==
Key
W	F	SF	QF	#R	RR	Q#	DNQ	A	NH

(W) winner; (F) finalist; (SF) semifinalist; (QF) quarterfinalist; (#R) rounds 4, 3, 2, 1; (RR) round-robin stage; (Q#) qualification round; (DNQ) did not qualify; (A) absent; (NH) not held; (SR) strike rate (events won / competed); (W–L) win–loss record.

Tournament	1987	1988	1989	1990	1991	1992	1993	1994	1995	1996	1997	1998	Career SR	Career win–loss
Grand Slam tournaments
Australian Open	A	A	A	A	A	A	3R	A	3R	2R	A	A	0 / 3	5–3
French Open	A	A	A	A	A	3R	1R	1R	1R	3R	2R	A	0 / 6	5–6
Wimbledon	A	A	A	A	A	1R	1R	1R	2R	1R	2R	A	0 / 6	2–6
U.S. Open	A	A	A	A	A	1R	2R	2R	2R	QF	3R	A	0 / 6	7–6
Grand Slam SR	0 / 0	0 / 0	0 / 0	0 / 0	0 / 0	0 / 3	0 / 4	0 / 3	0 / 4	0 / 4	0 / 3	0 / 0	0 / 21	N/A
Annual win–loss	0–0	0–0	0–0	0–0	0–0	2–3	3–4	1–3	4–4	6–4	3–3	0–0	N/A	19–21
ATP Masters Series
Indian Wells	NM1 Before 1990			A	A	A	A	A	2R	SF	1R	1R	0 / 4	4–4
Miami	NM1 Before 1990			A	A	A	2R	1R	2R	3R	A	3R	0 / 5	3–4
Monte Carlo	NM1 Before 1990			A	A	A	A	A	2R	QF	1R	QF	0 / 4	5–4
Rome	NM1 Before 1990			A	A	1R	A	A	A	1R	1R	1R	0 / 4	0–4
Hamburg	NM1 Before 1990			A	A	A	A	A	QF	QF	QF	1R	0 / 4	6–4
Canada	NM1 Before 1990			A	A	A	A	A	A	A	SF	A	0 / 1	3–1
Cincinnati	NM1 Before 1990			A	A	SF	A	A	1R	1R	2R	A	0 / 4	4–4
Stuttgart (Stockholm)	NM1 Before 1990			A	A	1R	A	A	2R	QF	1R	A	0 / 4	3–4
Paris	NM1 Before 1990			A	A	A	A	A	2R	2R	QF	A	0 / 3	4–3
Masters Series SR	N/A			0 / 0	0 / 0	0 / 3	0 / 1	0 / 1	0 / 7	0 / 8	0 / 8	0 / 5	0 / 33	N/A
Annual win–loss	N/A			0–0	0–0	3–3	0–1	0–1	7–7	11–7	8–8	3–5	N/A	32–32
Year-end ranking	623	–	517	449	237	41	82	63	39	34	43	253	N/A	
