= Richey Reneberg =

American tennis player

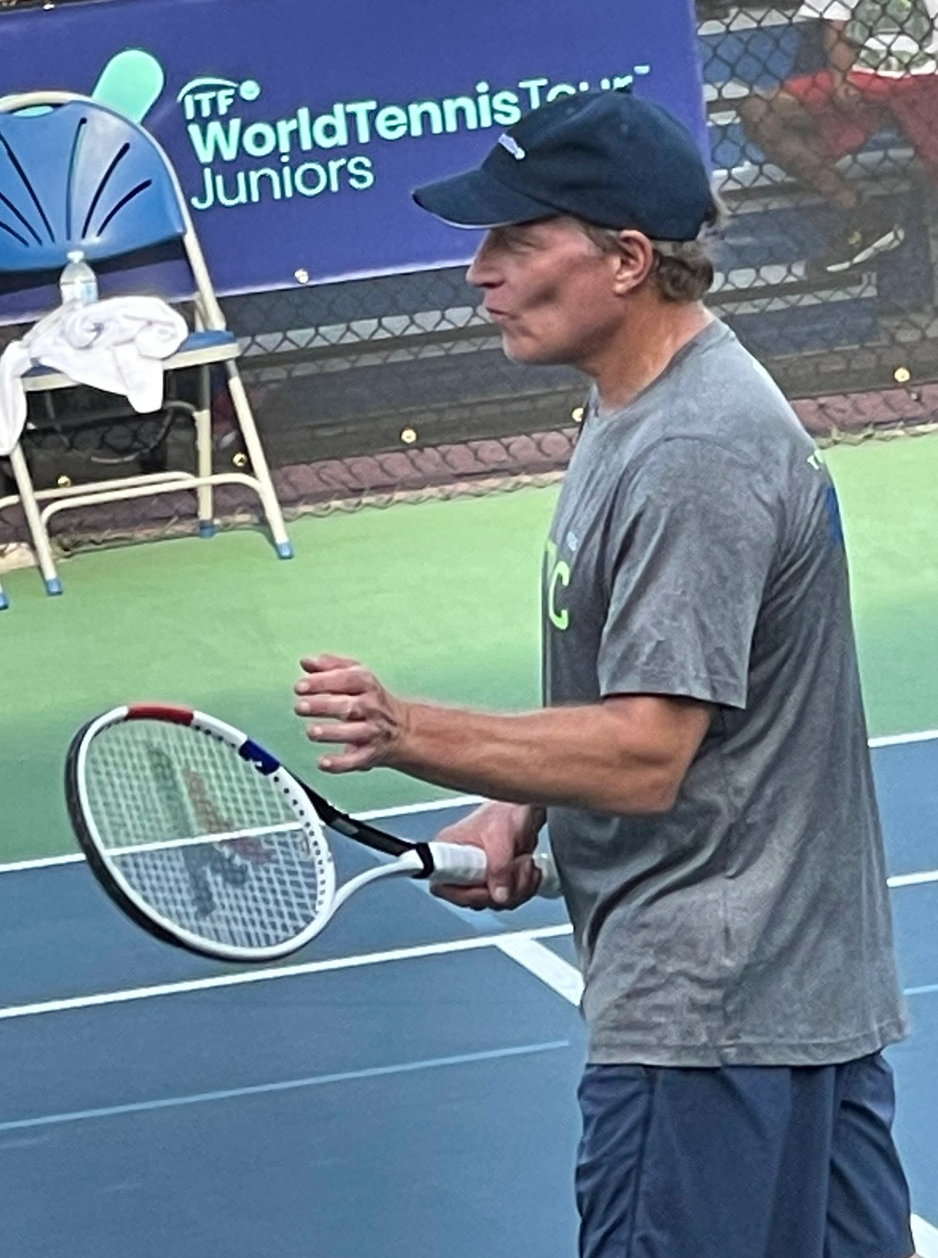
- Reneberg in 2021
- Country (sports): United States
- Residence: Bethesda, Maryland, U.S.
- Born: October 5, 1965 (age 60) Phoenix, Arizona, U.S.
- Height: 5 ft 11 in (1.80 m)
- Turned pro: 1987
- Retired: 2000
- Plays: Right-handed (two-handed backhand)
- Prize money: $4,407,308

Singles
- Career record: 307–263
- Career titles: 3
- Highest ranking: No. 20 (May 6, 1991)

Grand Slam singles results
- Australian Open: 3R (1992, 1998)
- French Open: 3R (1994, 1995)
- Wimbledon: 4R (1997)
- US Open: 4R (1994)

Doubles
- Career record: 335–244
- Career titles: 19
- Highest ranking: No. 1 (February 1, 1993)

Richey Reneberg (born October 5, 1965) is an American former professional tennis player.

He attended Southern Methodist University, where he was a three-time All-American and reached the 1986 National Collegiate Athletic Association finals.

He was the ATP Newcomer of the Year when he turned professional in 1987.

He and his partner Jim Grabb were ranked world No. 1 in doubles and won the 1992 US Open doubles title. His career-high singles ranking in the ATP Tour was world No. 20. He won a second doubles Grand Slam title with Jared Palmer, at the 1995 Australian Open.

The right-hander represented the United States at the 1996 Summer Olympics in Atlanta where he was defeated as the 11th seed in the first round by India's Leander Paes. He also played on the American Davis Cup team.

== Grand Slam finals ==
=== Doubles: 3 (2 titles, 1 runner-up) ===
Result	Year	Championship	Surface	Partner	Opponents	Score
Loss	1992	Wimbledon	Grass	(United States) Jim Grabb	(United States) John McEnroe (Germany) Michael Stich	7–5, 6–7^{(5–7)}, 6–3, 6–7^{(5–7)}, 17–19
Win	1992	US Open	Hard	(United States) Jim Grabb	(United States) Kelly Jones (United States) Rick Leach	3–6, 7–6^{(7–2)}, 6–3, 6–3
Win	1995	Australian Open	Hard	(United States) Jared Palmer	(The Bahamas) Mark Knowles (Canada) Daniel Nestor	6–3, 3–6, 6–3, 6–2

== Career finals ==
=== Singles: 7 (3 wins) ===
Result	No.	Date	Tournament	Surface	Opponent	Score
Loss	1.	Jan 1990	Wellington, New Zealand	Hard	(Spain) Emilio Sánchez	7–6^{(7–3)}, 4–6, 6–4, 4–6, 1–6
Win	1.	May 1991	Tampa, U.S.	Clay	(Czech Republic) Petr Korda	4–6, 6–4, 6–2
Win	2.	Jan 1993	Kuala Lumpur, Malaysia	Hard	(France) Olivier Delaître	6–3, 6–1
Loss	2.	Jan 1994	Oahu, U.S.	Hard	(South Africa) Wayne Ferreira	4–6, 7–6^{(7–3)}, 1–6
Loss	3.	Apr 1996	Tokyo, Japan	Hard	(United States) Pete Sampras	4–6, 5–7
Win	3.	Jun 1996	Rosmalen, Netherlands	Grass	(France) Stéphane Simian	6–4, 6–0
Loss	4.	Mar 1997	Scottsdale, U.S.	Hard	(Australia) Mark Philippoussis	4–6, 6–7^{(4–7)}

=== Doubles: 35 (19 wins) ===
Legend Grand Slam (2) Tennis Masters Cup (0) ATP Masters Series (0) ATP Championship Series (7) ATP Tour (10)	Titles by surface Hard (12) Clay (3) Grass (1) Carpet (3)

Result	No.	Date	Tournament	Surface	Partner	Opponents	Score
Win	1.	Nov 1989	Johannesburg, South Africa	Hard (i)	(United States) Luke Jensen	(United States) Kelly Jones (United States) Joey Rive	6–0, 6–4
Loss	1.	Feb 1990	San Francisco, U.S.	Hard (i)	(United States) Glenn Layendecker	(United States) Kelly Jones (United States) Robert Van't Hof	6–2, 6–7^{(3–7)}, 3–6
Loss	2.	May 1991	Tampa, U.S.	Clay	(United States) David Pate	(United States) Ken Flach (United States) Robert Seguso	7–6, 4–6, 1–6
Loss	3.	May 1991	Umag, Yugoslavia	Clay	(United States) David Wheaton	(Israel) Gilad Bloom (Spain) Javier Sánchez	6–7, 6–2, 1–6
Win	2.	Oct 1991	Sydney Indoor, Australia	Hard (i)	(United States) Jim Grabb	(United States) Luke Jensen (Australia) Laurie Warder	6–4, 6–4
Win	3.	Oct 1991	Tokyo Indoor, Japan	Carpet (i)	(United States) Jim Grabb	(United States) Scott Davis (United States) David Pate	7–5, 2–6, 7–6
Win	4.	Feb 1992	San Francisco, U.S.	Hard (i)	(United States) Jim Grabb	(South Africa) Pieter Aldrich (South Africa) Danie Visser	6–4, 7–5
Loss	4.	Feb 1992	Philadelphia, U.S.	Carpet (i)	(United States) Jim Grabb	(Australia) Todd Woodbridge (Australia) Mark Woodforde	4–6, 6–7
Win	5.	Jun 1992	Rosmalen, Netherlands	Grass	(United States) Jim Grabb	(United States) John McEnroe (Germany) Michael Stich	6–4, 6–7, 6–4
Loss	5.	Jul 1992	Wimbledon, London	Grass	(United States) Jim Grabb	(United States) John McEnroe (Germany) Michael Stich	7–5, 6–7^{(5–7)}, 6–3, 6–7^{(5–7)}, 17–19
Win	6.	Aug 1992	Indianapolis, U.S.	Hard	(United States) Jim Grabb	(Canada) Grant Connell (Canada) Glenn Michibata	7–6, 6–2
Win	7.	Sep 1992	US Open, New York	Hard	(United States) Jim Grabb	(United States) Kelly Jones (United States) Rick Leach	3–6, 7–6^{(7–2)}, 6–3, 6–3
Loss	6.	Oct 1992	Sydney Indoor, Australia	Hard (i)	(United States) Jim Grabb	(United States) Patrick McEnroe (United States) Jonathan Stark	2–6, 3–6
Loss	7.	Oct 1992	Tokyo Indoor, Japan	Carpet (i)	(United States) Jim Grabb	(Australia) Todd Woodbridge (Australia) Mark Woodforde	6–7, 4–6
Win	8.	Feb 1993	Philadelphia, U.S.	Carpet (i)	(United States) Jim Grabb	(South Africa) Marcos Ondruska (United States) Brad Pearce	6–7, 6–3, 6–0
Win	9.	May 1993	Atlanta, U.S.	Clay	(United States) Paul Annacone	(United States) Todd Martin (United States) Jared Palmer	6–4, 7–6
Win	10.	Oct 1993	Sydney Indoor, Australia	Hard (i)	(United States) Patrick McEnroe	(Germany) Alexander Mronz (Germany) Lars Rehmann	6–3, 7–5
Win	11.	Apr 1994	Birmingham, U.S.	Clay	(South Africa) Christo van Rensburg	(United States) Brian MacPhie (United States) David Witt	2–6, 6–3, 6–2
Win	12.	May 1994	Atlanta, U.S.	Clay	(United States) Jared Palmer	(United States) Francisco Montana (United States) Jim Pugh	4–6, 7–6, 6–4
Loss	8.	May 1994	Pinehurst, U.S.	Clay	(United States) Jared Palmer	(Australia) Todd Woodbridge (Australia) Mark Woodforde	2–6, 6–3, 3–6
Loss	9.	Aug 1994	Indianapolis, U.S.	Hard	(United States) Jim Grabb	(Australia) Todd Woodbridge (Australia) Mark Woodforde	3–6, 4–6
Win	13.	Jan 1995	Australian Open, Melbourne	Hard	(United States) Jared Palmer	(The Bahamas) Mark Knowles (Canada) Daniel Nestor	6–3, 3–6, 6–3, 6–2
Win	14.	Feb 1995	Memphis, U.S.	Hard (i)	(United States) Jared Palmer	(United States) Tommy Ho (New Zealand) Brett Steven	4–6, 7–6, 6–1
Loss	10.	May 1995	Atlanta, U.S.	Clay	(United States) Jared Palmer	(Spain) Sergio Casal (Spain) Emilio Sánchez	7–6, 3–6, 6–7
Loss	11.	Feb 1996	San Jose, U.S.	Hard (i)	(United States) Jonathan Stark	(United States) Trevor Kronemann (Australia) David Macpherson	4–6, 6–3, 3–6
Loss	12.	Mar 1996	Scottsdale, U.S.	Hard	(New Zealand) Brett Steven	(United States) Patrick Galbraith (United States) Rick Leach	7–5, 5–7, 5–7
Win	15.	Aug 1996	Indianapolis, U.S.	Hard	(United States) Jim Grabb	(Czech Republic) Petr Korda (Czech Republic) Cyril Suk	7–6, 4–6, 6–4
Win	16.	Oct 1996	Lyon, France	Carpet (i)	(United States) Jim Grabb	(United Kingdom) Neil Broad (South Africa) Piet Norval	6–2, 6–1
Win	17.	Nov 1997	Stockholm, Sweden	Hard (i)	(Germany) Marc-Kevin Goellner	(South Africa) Ellis Ferreira (United States) Patrick Galbraith	6–3, 3–6, 7–6
Loss	13.	Mar 1998	Philadelphia, U.S.	Hard (i)	(Australia) David Macpherson	(Netherlands) Jacco Eltingh (Netherlands) Paul Haarhuis	6–7, 7–6, 2–6
Loss	14.	Mar 1998	Indian Wells, U.S.	Hard	(United States) Todd Martin	(Sweden) Jonas Björkman (Australia) Patrick Rafter	4–6, 6–7
Loss	15.	May 1998	Atlanta, U.S.	Clay	(United States) Alex O'Brien	(South Africa) Ellis Ferreira (South Africa) Brent Haygarth	3–6, 6–0, 2–6
Win	18.	Mar 1999	Scottsdale, U.S.	Hard	(United States) Justin Gimelstob	(The Bahamas) Mark Knowles (Australia) Sandon Stolle	6–4, 6–7^{(4–7)}, 6–3
Loss	16.	Feb 2000	Memphis, U.S.	Hard (i)	(United States) Jim Grabb	(United States) Justin Gimelstob (Canada) Sébastien Lareau	2–6, 4–6
Win	19.	Mar 2000	Scottsdale, U.S.	Hard	(United States) Jared Palmer	(United States) Patrick Galbraith (Australia) David Macpherson	6–3, 7–5

== Doubles performance timeline ==
Key
W	F	SF	QF	#R	RR	Q#	DNQ	A	NH

(W) winner; (F) finalist; (SF) semifinalist; (QF) quarterfinalist; (#R) rounds 4, 3, 2, 1; (RR) round-robin stage; (Q#) qualification round; (DNQ) did not qualify; (A) absent; (NH) not held; (SR) strike rate (events won / competed); (W–L) win–loss record.

Tournament	1985	1986	1987	1988	1989	1990	1991	1992	1993	1994	1995	1996	1997	1998	1999	2000	Career SR	Career W-L
Grand Slam tournaments
Australian Open	A	NH	A	2R	1R	3R	A	2R	QF	1R	W	A	3R	2R	QF	A	1 / 10	21–9
French Open	A	A	A	1R	A	1R	2R	QF	1R	3R	2R	3R	2R	1R	3R	A	0 / 11	11–11
Wimbledon	A	A	A	1R	A	1R	2R	F	2R	1R	3R	3R	1R	1R	3R	A	0 / 11	13–11
U.S. Open	A	A	A	1R	QF	3R	1R	W	3R	1R	1R	A	1R	1R	3R	A	1 / 11	15–10
Grand Slam SR	0 / 0	0 / 0	0 / 0	0 / 4	0 / 2	0 / 4	0 / 3	1 / 4	0 / 4	0 / 4	1 / 4	0 / 2	0 / 4	0 / 4	0 / 4	0 / 0	2 / 43	N/A
Annual win–loss	0–0	0–0	0–0	1–4	3–2	4–4	2–3	15–3	6–4	2–4	9–3	4–2	3–4	1–4	8–4	0–0	N/A	60–41
ATP Masters Series
Indian Wells	These Tournaments Were Not Masters Series Events Before 1990					1R	A	SF	QF	2R	1R	QF	2R	F	1R	1R	0 / 10	12–10
Miami	These Tournaments Were Not Masters Series Events Before 1990					QF	1R	A	A	3R	QF	QF	A	A	3R	1R	0 / 7	10–7
Monte Carlo	These Tournaments Were Not Masters Series Events Before 1990					A	A	A	A	A	A	A	A	A	A	1R	0 / 1	0–1
Rome	These Tournaments Were Not Masters Series Events Before 1990					2R	A	A	A	1R	1R	1R	A	A	2R	A	0 / 5	2–5
Hamburg	These Tournaments Were Not Masters Series Events Before 1990					A	A	A	A	A	A	A	A	A	1R	A	0 / 1	0–1
Canada	These Tournaments Were Not Masters Series Events Before 1990					2R	2R	QF	SF	A	1R	A	A	A	1R	A	0 / 6	5–6
Cincinnati	These Tournaments Were Not Masters Series Events Before 1990					1R	A	QF	SF	2R	QF	SF	A	A	1R	A	0 / 7	9–7
Stuttgart (Stockholm)	These Tournaments Were Not Masters Series Events Before 1990					1R	1R	1R	SF	1R	1R	SF	A	1R	1R	A	0 / 9	6–9
Paris	These Tournaments Were Not Masters Series Events Before 1990					1R	1R	SF	2R	2R	1R	2R	A	SF	2R	A	0 / 9	8–9
Masters Series SR	N/A					0 / 7	0 / 4	0 / 5	0 / 5	0 / 6	0 / 7	0 / 6	0 / 1	0 / 3	0 / 8	0 / 3	0 / 55	N/A
Annual win–loss	N/A					5–7	1–4	7–5	8–5	4–6	4–7	11–6	1–1	7–3	4–8	0–3	N/A	52–55
Year-end ranking	793	566	270	207	67	57	41	4	12	47	28	22	107	31	40	135	N/A	
