= Michael Tebbutt =

Australian tennis player

- Country (sports): Australia
- Born: 22 December 1970 (age 55) Sydney, Australia
- Height: 1.90 m (6 ft 3 in)
- Turned pro: 1993
- Plays: Left-handed
- Prize money: $1,114,448

Singles
- Career record: 64–84
- Career titles: 0
- Highest ranking: No. 87 (3 April 1995)

Grand Slam singles results
- Australian Open: 3R (1996)
- French Open: 1R (1995, 1996, 1998)
- Wimbledon: 2R (1994, 1998)
- US Open: 4R (1995)

Doubles
- Career record: 81–109
- Career titles: 2
- Highest ranking: No. 28 (22 July 1996)

Grand Slam doubles results
- Australian Open: 3R (1994, 1996, 1999, 2000)
- French Open: 1R (1996, 1997, 1998, 1999, 2000)
- Wimbledon: QF (1996)
- US Open: QF (1999)

Michael Tebbutt (born 22 December 1970) is an Australian former tennis player.

He was educated at St Johns Park High School (Australia) and Northern Arizona University (US) before starting his career as a professional tennis player.

He was the first NAU tennis player in the NAU Athletics Hall of Fame. Tebbutt played hitting the ball with both hands, both forehand and backhand. His service was powerful and this fact made him to have his best performances in fast courts.

Michael was ranked world No. 87 in singles and No. 26 in doubles.

In singles tournaments he had wins over Pat Rafter, Lleyton Hewitt, and Tim Henman. In doubles, he had wins over Andre Agassi, Pete Sampras and the Woodies, among others. He reached the fourth round of the US Open and third round of Australian Open in singles. He reached quarter finals at three of the Grand Slams, and overall has competed in 30+ Grand Slams.

ATP : Aces 1637 matches 147 Aces per match : 11.13605

18th on list of most aces per match of all time..

== Career finals ==
=== Doubles (2 wins, 4 losses) ===
Legend
Grand Slam (0–0)
Tennis Masters Cup (0–0)
ATP Masters Series (0–1)
ATP International Series Gold (1–0)
ATP International Series (1–3)

Result	W/L	Date	Tournament	Surface	Partner	Opponents	Score
Loss	0–1	Feb 1996	Shanghai, China	Carpet (i)	(United States) Jim Grabb	(The Bahamas) Mark Knowles (The Bahamas) Roger Smith	6–4, 2–6, 6–7
Loss	0–2	Mar 1996	Indian Wells, U.S.	Hard	(United States) Brian MacPhie	(Australia) Todd Woodbridge (Australia) Mark Woodforde	6–1, 2–6, 2–6
Loss	0–3	Jul 1996	Newport, U.S.	Grass	(Australia) Paul Kilderry	(South Africa) Marius Barnard (South Africa) Piet Norval	7–6, 4–6, 4–6
Win	1–3	Aug 1997	Indianapolis, U.S.	Hard	(Sweden) Mikael Tillström	(Sweden) Jonas Björkman (Sweden) Nicklas Kulti	6–3, 6–2
Win	2–3	Mar 1998	Scottsdale, U.S.	Hard	(Czechoslovakia) Cyril Suk	(United States) Kent Kinnear (United States) David Wheaton	4–6, 6–1, 7–6
Loss	2–4	Apr 1998	Orlando, U.S.	Clay	(Sweden) Mikael Tillström	(South Africa) Grant Stafford (Zimbabwe) Kevin Ullyett	6–4, 4–6, 5–7

== External links and references ==
- Michael Tebbutt at the Association of Tennis Professionals
- Michael Tebbutt at the International Tennis Federation
- NAU Athletics
