= Tennis Channel Open =

Tennis tournament

Defunct tennis tournament
- Founded: 1986
- Abolished: 2008
- Editions: 21
- Location: Scottsdale, Arizona (1986–2005); Las Vegas, Nevada (2006–2008); United States
- Category: WCT (1986–1989); International Series (1990–2008)
- Surface: Hard / outdoors
- Draw: 32S/16Q/16D (round-robin)

The Tennis Channel Open (its sponsored name) was a men's hard court tennis tournament also known as the Las Vegas Open. It was an ATP International Series event that was first founded as the WCT Scottsdale Open in 1986. That tournament by 2005 was officially known as the Scottsdale Open.

In 2005, The Tennis Channel purchased the tournament from IMG and moved it from Scottsdale to Las Vegas. In April 2008, The Tennis Channel announced that it was selling the tournament to the ATP, and the week the event had been held was now the first week of Davis Cup.

== History ==
Founded in 1986 as the WCT Scottsdale Open by 2005 that tournament was known as the Scottsdale Open. By the end of that year the Tennis Channel bought the rights to the event and moved it to Las Vegas where it was branded as the Tennis Channel Open in 2006 its sponsored name. The move to Las Vegas was to bring a top-level tour event back to the city to fill the gap left by the Alan King Tennis Classic that ended in 1985. It was succeeded later by a lower tier event the Las Vegas Challenger in 1997 that ran till 2000.

This event was an ATP World Series event from 1992 to 1999, then an ATP International Series event from 2000 that ran until 2008 when it was discontinued, when the Tennis Channel sold the rights to the event. In 2015 the Las Vegas Challenger event resumed. In 2023 it was renamed the Las Vegas Tennis Open.

== Past finals ==
The tournament had been in existence since 1986 located at the Scottsdale Radisson Resort. From 1987 to 2005 the tournament took place at the Fairmont Scottsdale Princess, where Andre Agassi was crowned champion four times.

=== Singles ===
Location	Year	Champion	Runner-up	Score
Scottsdale	1986	(United States) John McEnroe	(United States) Kevin Curren	6–3, 3–6, 6–2
Scottsdale	1987	(United States) Brad Gilbert	(United States) Eliot Teltscher	6–2, 6–2
Scottsdale	1988	(Sweden) Mikael Pernfors	(United States) Glenn Layendecker	6–2, 6–4
Scottsdale	1989	(Czechoslovakia) Ivan Lendl	(Sweden) Stefan Edberg	6–2, 6–3
Scottsdale	1990–91	Not held		
Scottsdale	1992	(Italy) Stefano Pescosolido	(United States) Brad Gilbert	6–0, 1–6, 6–4
Scottsdale	1993	(United States) Andre Agassi	(South Africa) Marcos Ondruska	6–2, 3–6, 6–3
Scottsdale	1994	(United States) Andre Agassi	(Brazil) Luiz Mattar	6–4, 6–3
Scottsdale	1995	(United States) Jim Courier	(Australia) Mark Philippoussis	7–6^{(7–2)}, 6–4
Scottsdale	1996	(South Africa) Wayne Ferreira	(Chile) Marcelo Ríos	2–6, 6–3, 6–3
Scottsdale	1997	(Australia) Mark Philippoussis	(United States) Richey Reneberg	6–4, 7–6^{(7–4)}
Scottsdale	1998	(United States) Andre Agassi	(Australia) Jason Stoltenberg	6–4, 7–6^{(7–3)}
Scottsdale	1999	(United States) Jan-Michael Gambill	(Australia) Lleyton Hewitt	7–6^{(7–2)}, 4–6, 6–4
Scottsdale	2000	(Australia) Lleyton Hewitt	(United Kingdom) Tim Henman	6–4, 7–6^{(7–2)}
Scottsdale	2001	(Spain) Francisco Clavet	(Sweden) Magnus Norman	6–4, 6–2
Scottsdale	2002	(United States) Andre Agassi	(Spain) Juan Balcells	6–2, 7–6^{(7–2)}
Scottsdale	2003	(Australia) Lleyton Hewitt	(Australia) Mark Philippoussis	6–4, 6–4
Scottsdale	2004	(United States) Vincent Spadea	(Germany) Nicolas Kiefer	7–5, 6–7^{(5–7)}, 6–3
Scottsdale	2005	(Australia) Wayne Arthurs	(Croatia) Mario Ančić	7–5, 6–3
Las Vegas	2006	(United States) James Blake	(Australia) Lleyton Hewitt	7–5, 2–6, 6–3
Las Vegas	2007	(Australia) Lleyton Hewitt	(Austria) Jürgen Melzer	6–4, 7–6^{(12–10)}
Las Vegas	2008	(United States) Sam Querrey	(South Africa) Kevin Anderson	4–6, 6–3, 6–4

=== Doubles ===
Location	Year	Champions	Runners-up	Score
Scottsdale	1986	(Mexico) Leonardo Lavalle (United States) Mike Leach	(United States) Scott Davis (United States) David Pate	7–6, 6–4
Scottsdale	1987	(United States) Rick Leach (United States) Jim Pugh	(United States) Dan Goldie (United States) Mel Purcell	6–3, 6–2
Scottsdale	1988	(United States) Scott Davis (United States) Tim Wilkison	(United States) Rick Leach (United States) Jim Pugh	6–4, 7–6
Scottsdale	1989	(United States) Rick Leach (United States) Jim Pugh	(United States) Paul Annacone (South Africa) Christo van Rensburg	6–7, 6–3, 6–2, 2–6, 6–4
Scottsdale	1990–91	Not held		
Scottsdale	1992	(United States) Mark Keil (United States) Dave Randall	(United States) Kent Kinnear (United States) Sven Salumaa	4–6, 6–1, 6–2
Scottsdale	1993	(United States) Mark Keil (United States) Dave Randall	(United States) Luke Jensen (Australia) Sandon Stolle	7–5, 6–4
Scottsdale	1994	(Sweden) Jan Apell (United States) Ken Flach	(United States) Alex O'Brien (Australia) Sandon Stolle	6–0, 6–4
Scottsdale	1995	(United States) Trevor Kronemann (Australia) David Macpherson	(Argentina) Luis Lobo (Spain) Javier Sánchez	4–6, 6–3, 6–4
Scottsdale	1996	(United States) Patrick Galbraith (United States) Rick Leach	(United States) Richey Reneberg (New Zealand) Brett Steven	5–7, 7–5, 7–5
Scottsdale	1997	(Argentina) Luis Lobo (Spain) Javier Sánchez	(Sweden) Jonas Björkman (United States) Rick Leach	6–3, 6–3
Scottsdale	1998	(Czech Republic) Cyril Suk (Australia) Michael Tebbutt	(United States) Kent Kinnear (United States) David Wheaton	4–6, 6–1, 7–6
Scottsdale	1999	(United States) Justin Gimelstob (United States) Richey Reneberg	(The Bahamas) Mark Knowles (Australia) Sandon Stolle	6–4, 6–7^{(4–7)}, 6–3
Scottsdale	2000	(United States) Jared Palmer (United States) Richey Reneberg	(United States) Patrick Galbraith (Australia) David Macpherson	6–3, 7–5
Scottsdale	2001	(United States) Donald Johnson (United States) Jared Palmer	(Chile) Marcelo Ríos (Netherlands) Sjeng Schalken	7–6^{(7–3)}, 6–2
Scottsdale	2002	(United States) Bob Bryan (United States) Mike Bryan	(The Bahamas) Mark Knowles (Canada) Daniel Nestor	7–5, 7–6^{(8–6)}
Scottsdale	2003	(United States) James Blake (The Bahamas) Mark Merklein	(Australia) Lleyton Hewitt (Australia) Mark Philippoussis	6–4, 6–7^{(2–7}), 7–6^{(7–5)}
Scottsdale	2004	(United States) Rick Leach (United States) Brian MacPhie	(South Africa) Jeff Coetzee (South Africa) Chris Haggard	6–3, 6–1
Scottsdale	2005	(United States) Bob Bryan (United States) Mike Bryan	(Australia) Wayne Arthurs (Australia) Paul Hanley	7–5, 6–4
Las Vegas	2006	(United States) Bob Bryan (United States) Mike Bryan	(Czech Republic) Jaroslav Levinský (Sweden) Robert Lindstedt	6–3, 6–2
Las Vegas	2007	(United States) Bob Bryan (United States) Mike Bryan	(Israel) Jonathan Erlich (Israel) Andy Ram	7–6^{(8–6)}, 6–2
Las Vegas	2008	(France) Julien Benneteau (France) Michaël Llodra	(United States) Bob Bryan (United States) Mike Bryan	6–4, 4–6, [10–8]

== Event names ==
Official

- WCT Scottsdale Open (1986–1987)
- WCT Scottsdale Classic (1988–1989)
- Arizona Tennis Championship's (1992–1996)
- Scottsdale Tennis Classic (1997–2004)
- Scottsdale Open (2005)
- Las Vegas Open (2006–2008)

Sponsored

- Eagle Classic (1988 -1989)
- Purex Tennis Championships (1992–1993)
- Nuveen Championships (1994)
- MassMutual Championships (1995)
- Franklin Templeton Classic (1996–1997)
- Franklin Templeton Tennis Classic (1998–2000)
- Franklin Templeton Classic (2001–2004)
- Tennis Channel Open (2005- 2008)

== See also ==
- The Tennis Channel
- Alan King Tennis Classic
- Las Vegas Challenger
- List of tennis tournaments
