= California State Championships =

Tennis tournament in California, US

Defunct tennis tournament
- Tour: USNLTA Circuit (1901–23); ILTF World Circuit (1924–69) men (1924–72) women ILTF Independent Circuit (1970–83) men (1973–83) women
- Founded: 1901; 125 years ago
- Abolished: 1983; 43 years ago
- Location: Berkeley; Menlo Park; Oakland; Pebble Beach; Portola Valley; San Francisco; San Rafael
- Venue: Alpine Hills TC; Berkeley TC; Claremont Country Club; Hotel Rafael TC; Menlo Circus Club; Pebble Beach Club
- Surface: Hard / outdoor

The California State Championships also called the California Championships was a men's and women's international hard court tennis tournament was founded in 1901. It was first played at Hotel Rafael, San Rafael, California, United States. It was also hosted at other locations throughout its run until 1983 when it was discontinued.

== History ==
The tournament was first established in July 1901 when it was held at Hotel Rafael, San Rafael, California, the event had been inaugurated to take place at the same time as the Pacific Coast Championships July 2 to 4 that year but had been postponed until September. The first winner of the men's singles was George F. Whitney. In 1903 a women's event was added to the schedule with the state singles title going to Miriam Edwards.

The championships have been held in various locations including Berkeley, Menlo Park, Oakland, Pebble Beach, Portola Valley, San Francisco and San Rafael. The event was discontinued as an individual competition in 1983 when it became a team competition. Previous winners of the men's singles have included; Maurice McLoughlin, Bill Johnston, Ellsworth Vines, Don Budge,Frank Kovacs, Jack Kramer, Tony Roche and Sandy Mayer.

Former winners of the women's state singles championship has included; Hazel Hotchkiss, May Sutton, Helen Wills, Helen Jacobs, Alice Marble, Margaret Osborne, Mimi Arnold, Janet Hopps, Rosie Casals, Denise Carter, Billie Jean Moffitt King, Eliza Pande and Kate Latham. The tournament was discontinued in 1983 when it was switched from an individual competition to a team competition.
