= 2000 Sybase Open – Doubles =

Doubles
- 2000 Sybase Open

Final
- Champions: (United States) Jan-Michael Gambill (United States) Scott Humphries
- Runners-up: (Argentina) Lucas Arnold Ker (United States) Eric Taino
- Score: 6–1, 6–4

Details
- Draw: 16
- Seeds: 4

Events
Singles	Doubles
← 1999 ·	Pacific Coast Championships	· 2001 →

Todd Woodbridge and Mark Woodforde were the defending champions, but lost in quarterfinals to Bob Bryan and Mike Bryan.

Jan-Michael Gambill and Scott Humphries won the title by defeating Lucas Arnold Ker and Eric Taino 6–1, 6–4 in the final.

== Seeds ==
1. (Australia) Todd Woodbridge / (Australia) Mark Woodforde (quarterfinals)
2. (United States) Jared Palmer / (Federal Republic of Yugoslavia) Nenad Zimonjić (semifinals)
3. (Argentina) Pablo Albano / (United States) Justin Gimelstob (first round)
4. (United States) Jan-Michael Gambill / (United States) Scott Humphries (champions)

== Draw ==
=== Key ===
- Q = Qualifier
- WC = Wild card
- LL = Lucky loser
- Alt = Alternate
- SE = Special exempt
- PR = Protected ranking
- ITF = ITF entry
- JE = Junior exempt
- w/o = Walkover
- r = Retired
- d = Defaulted
- SR = Special ranking

=== Draw ===
First round
1	(Australia) T Woodbridge (Australia) M Woodforde	6	7^{7}
(South Africa) W Ferreira (South Africa) M Ondruska	3	6^{4}
(United States) B Bryan (United States) M Bryan	7^{15}	4	6
Q	(Argentina) G Cañas (Federal Republic of Yugoslavia) D Vemić	6^{13}	6	3
3	(Argentina) P Albano (United States) J Gimelstob	3	7^{7}	6^{5}
(Argentina) L Arnold Ker (United States) E Taino	6	6^{2}	7^{7}
(United States) B Coupe (United States) J Waite	6	6
WC	(United States) J Blake (United States) C Mamiit	4	3
WC	(United States) J Courier (United States) J Stark	6^{3}	7^{7}	6^{8}
WC	(United States) L Jensen (United States) M Jensen	7^{7}	6^{5}	7^{10}
(United States) J Grabb (United States) R Reneberg	1	7^{7}	3
4	(United States) JM Gambill (United States) S Humphries	6	6^{5}	6
(South Africa) L Bale (Australia) M Hill	5	2
(United States) P Galbraith (United States) B MacPhie	7	6
(Australia) M Tebbutt (Sweden) M Tillström	6	3	2
2	(United States) J Palmer (Federal Republic of Yugoslavia) N Zimonjić	3	6	6

Quarterfinals
1	(Australia) T Woodbridge (Australia) M Woodforde	3	2
(United States) B Bryan (United States) M Bryan	6	6
(Argentina) L Arnold Ker (United States) E Taino	6	6
(United States) B Coupe (United States) J Waite	4	2
WC	(United States) L Jensen (United States) M Jensen	0	1
4	(United States) JM Gambill (United States) S Humphries	6	6
(United States) P Galbraith (United States) B MacPhie	6	3	4
2	(United States) J Palmer (Federal Republic of Yugoslavia) N Zimonjić	3	6	6

Semifinals
(United States) B Bryan (United States) M Bryan	6^{8}	4
(Argentina) L Arnold Ker (United States) E Taino	7^{10}	6
4	(United States) JM Gambill (United States) S Humphries	6	3	7
2	(United States) J Palmer (Federal Republic of Yugoslavia) N Zimonjić	4	6	5

Final
(Argentina) L Arnold Ker (United States) E Taino	1	4
4	(United States) JM Gambill (United States) S Humphries	6	6
