= 2002 Siebel Open – Doubles =

Doubles
- 2002 Siebel Open

Final
- Champions: (Zimbabwe) Wayne Black (Zimbabwe) Kevin Ullyett
- Runners-up: (South Africa) John-Laffnie de Jager (South Africa) Robbie Koenig
- Score: 6–3, 4–6, [10–5]

Details
- Draw: 16
- Seeds: 4

Events
Singles	Doubles
← 2001 ·	Pacific Coast Championships	· 2003 →

Mark Knowles and Brian MacPhie were the defending champions but only MacPhie competed that year with Nenad Zimonjić.

MacPhie and Zimonjić lost in the semifinals to John-Laffnie de Jager and Robbie Koenig.

Wayne Black and Kevin Ullyett won in the final 6–3, 4–6, [10–5] against de Jager and Koenig.

== Seeds ==
Champion seeds are indicated in bold text while text in italics indicates the round in which those seeds were eliminated.

1. (India) Mahesh Bhupathi / (India) Leander Paes (first round)
2. (Zimbabwe) **Wayne Black** / (Zimbabwe) **Kevin Ullyett (champions)**
3. (United States) Brian MacPhie / (Federal Republic of Yugoslavia) Nenad Zimonjić (semifinals)
4. (Australia) Andrew Florent / (Australia) David Macpherson (first round)

== Draw ==
=== Key ===
- Q = Qualifier
- WC = Wild card
- LL = Lucky loser
- Alt = Alternate
- SE = Special exempt
- PR = Protected ranking
- ITF = ITF entry
- JE = Junior exempt
- w/o = Walkover
- r = Retired
- d = Defaulted
- SR = Special ranking

First round
1	(India) M Bhupathi (India) L Paes	3	4
(United States) **J Blake** (United States) **T Martin**	**6**	**6**
(Belgium) X Malisse (Italy) D Sanguinetti	3	**7**	[8]
(South Africa) **J-L de Jager** (South Africa) **R Koenig**	**6**	5	**[10]**
3	(United States) **B MacPhie** (Federal Republic of Yugoslavia) **N Zimonjić**	**6**	**6**
WC	(Australia) S Draper (Australia) L Hewitt	3	3
(Czech Republic) L Friedl (Czech Republic) P Luxa	**6**	3	[8]
(South Africa) **C Haggard** (Belgium) **T Vanhoudt**	4	**6**	**[10]**
(France) M Llodra (Japan) T Shimada	6^{5}	2
(Sweden) **J Björkman** (United States) **J Gimelstob**	**7^{7}**	**6**
WC	(United States) **J-M Gambill** (United States) **S Humphries**	**6**	**6**
4	(Australia) A Florent (Australia) D Macpherson	1	4
WC	(United States) **M Fish** (United States) **J Morrison**	**6**	**6**
(United States) D Bowen (North Macedonia) A Kitinov	3	3
(Australia) W Arthurs (Spain) J Balcells	3	5
2	(Zimbabwe) **W Black** (Zimbabwe) **K Ullyett**	**6**	**7**

Quarterfinals
(United States) J Blake (United States) T Martin	**6**	1	[7]
(South Africa) **J-L de Jager** (South Africa) **R Koenig**	4	**6**	**[10]**
3	(United States) **B MacPhie** (Federal Republic of Yugoslavia) **N Zimonjić**	**6**	**6**
(South Africa) C Haggard (Belgium) T Vanhoudt	1	4
(Sweden) **J Björkman** (United States) **J Gimelstob**	**6**	**6**
WC	(United States) J-M Gambill (United States) S Humphries	0	3
WC	(United States) M Fish (United States) J Morrison	5	4
2	(Zimbabwe) **W Black** (Zimbabwe) **K Ullyett**	**7**	**6**

Semifinals
(South Africa) **J-L de Jager** (South Africa) **R Koenig**	**w/o**
3	(United States) B MacPhie (Federal Republic of Yugoslavia) N Zimonjić
(Sweden) J Björkman (United States) J Gimelstob	**6**	3	[8]
2	(Zimbabwe) **W Black** (Zimbabwe) **K Ullyett**	3	**6**	**[10]**

Final
(South Africa) John-Laffnie de Jager (South Africa) Robbie Koenig	3	**6**	[5]
2	(Zimbabwe) **Wayne Black** (Zimbabwe) **Kevin Ullyett**	**6**	4	**[10]**
