= 1998 Sybase Open – Doubles =

Doubles
- 1998 Sybase Open

Final
- Champions: (Australia) Mark Woodforde (Australia) Todd Woodbridge
- Runners-up: (Brazil) Nelson Aerts (Brazil) André Sá
- Score: 6–1, 7–5

Details
- Draw: 16
- Seeds: 4

Events
Singles	Doubles
← 1997 ·	Pacific Coast Championships	· 1999 →

The 1998 Sybase Open was a men's tennis tournament played on indoor hard courts at the San Jose Arena in San Jose, California in the United States and was part of the ATP World Series of the 1998 ATP Tour. It was the 109th edition of the tournament ran from February 9 through February 15, 1998.

== Seeds ==
Champion seeds are indicated in bold text while text in italics indicates the round in which those seeds were eliminated.

1. (Australia) **Todd Woodbridge** / (Australia) **Mark Woodforde (champions)**
2. (Brazil) Gustavo Kuerten / (Brazil) Fernando Meligeni (first round)
3. (Australia) David Macpherson / (United States) Richey Reneberg (quarterfinals)
4. (Zimbabwe) Wayne Black / (United States) Jeff Salzenstein (semifinals)

== Draw ==
=== Key ===
- Q = Qualifier
- WC = Wild card
- LL = Lucky loser
- Alt = Alternate
- SE = Special exempt
- PR = Protected ranking
- ITF = ITF entry
- JE = Junior exempt
- w/o = Walkover
- r = Retired
- d = Defaulted
- SR = Special ranking

=== Finals ===
First round
1	(Australia) **T Woodbridge** **(Australia) M Woodforde**	**6**	**6**
(United States) B Coupe (South Africa) P Rosner	3	4
(South Africa) **G Stafford** **(United States) J Waite**	1	**6**	**7**
(Armenia) S Sargsian (United States) G Van Emburgh	**6**	4	6
4	(Zimbabwe) **W Black** **(United States) J Salzenstein**	**6**	**6**
(United States) J Palmer (United States) J Stark	3	4
(United States) **J Gimelstob** **(United States) B MacPhie**	**6**	**7**
(Germany) T Haas (Australia) M Philippoussis	2	6
(Brazil) **N Aerts** **(Brazil) A Sá**	6	**6**	**6**
(United States) B Bryan (United States) M Bryan	**7**	3	4
3	(Australia) **D Macpherson** **(United States) R Reneberg**	**6**	**6**
(Spain) J Burillo (Spain) A Martín	1	3
(United States) **S Davis** **(United States) A O'Brien**	**6**	**6**
(United States) D Bowen (Mexico) Ó Ortiz	3	4
(United States) **D DiLucia** **(United States) M Sell**	4	**6**	**7**
2	(Brazil) G Kuerten (Brazil) F Meligeni	**6**	1	5

Quarterfinals
1	(Australia) **T Woodbridge** **(Australia) M Woodforde**	**6**	**7**
(South Africa) G Stafford (United States) J Waite	4	5
4	(Zimbabwe) **W Black** **(United States) J Salzenstein**	W/O
(United States) J Gimelstob (United States) B MacPhie
(Brazil) **N Aerts** **(Brazil) A Sá**	**7**	3	**7**
3	(Australia) D Macpherson (United States) R Reneberg	6	**6**	6
(United States) S Davis (United States) A O'Brien	5	4
(United States) **D DiLucia** **(United States) M Sell**	**7**	**6**

Semifinals
1	(Australia) **T Woodbridge** **(Australia) M Woodforde**	**7**	**7**
4	(Zimbabwe) W Black (United States) J Salzenstein	5	6
(Brazil) **N Aerts** **(Brazil) A Sá**	**6**	**7**
(United States) D DiLucia (United States) M Sell	2	6

Final
1	(Australia) **T Woodbridge** **(Australia) M Woodforde**	**6**	**7**
(Brazil) N Aerts (Brazil) A Sá	1	5
