= 1993 Volvo Tennis San Francisco – Singles =

Singles
- 1993 Volvo Tennis San Francisco

Final
- Champion: (United States) Andre Agassi
- Runner-up: (United States) Brad Gilbert
- Score: 6–2, 6–7^{(4–7)}, 6–2

Details
- Draw: 32 (3WC / 4Q)
- Seeds: 8

Events
Singles	Doubles
← 1992 ·	Pacific Coast Championships	· 1994 →

Michael Chang was the defending champion, but did not compete this year.

Andre Agassi won the title by defeating Brad Gilbert 6–2, 6–7^{(4–7)}, 6–2 in the final.

== Seeds ==
1. (United States) Andre Agassi (champion)
2. (United States) Brad Gilbert (final)
3. (Brazil) Jaime Oncins (quarterfinals)
4. (Italy) Renzo Furlan (first round)
5. (United States) Jim Grabb (first round)
6. (United States) Jeff Tarango (semifinals)
7. (United States) Richey Reneberg (quarterfinals)
8. (South Africa) Marcos Ondruska (quarterfinals)

== Draw ==
=== Key ===
- Q = Qualifier
- WC = Wild card
- LL = Lucky loser
- Alt = Alternate
- SE = Special exempt
- PR = Protected ranking
- ITF = ITF entry
- JE = Junior exempt
- w/o = Walkover
- r = Retired
- d = Defaulted
- SR = Special ranking

=== Finals ===
Semifinals
1/WC	(United States) Andre Agassi	6	6
6	(United States) Jeff Tarango	3	3
(United States) Jimmy Connors	1	4^{r}
2	(United States) Brad Gilbert	6	1

Final
1/WC	(United States) Andre Agassi	6	6^{4}	6
2	(United States) Brad Gilbert	2	7^{7}	2

=== Top half ===
First round
1/WC	(United States) A Agassi	6	7^{9}
(United States) J Stark	2	6^{7}
(United States) P McEnroe	3	6	6
(Germany) C Saceanu	6	3	3
(United States) T Martin	6	6^{5}	5
(Australia) J Morgan	4	7^{7}	7
(United States) J Palmer	1	4
8	(South Africa) M Ondruska	6	6
3	(Brazil) J Oncins	6	6^{7}	6
WC	(Sweden) B Borg	4	7^{9}	4
WC	(Australia) S Stolle	4	3
(South Africa) G Muller	6	6
(United States) R Weiss	6	3	6
(Australia) S Youl	3	6	2
Q	(Australia) N Borwick	4	4
6	(United States) J Tarango	6	6

Second round
1/WC	(United States) A Agassi	6	6
(United States) P McEnroe	0	2
(Australia) J Morgan	3	6	4
8	(South Africa) M Ondruska	6	2	6
3	(Brazil) J Oncins	2	6	4
(South Africa) G Muller	6	4	2^{r}
(United States) R Weiss	2	5
6	(United States) J Tarango	6	7

Quarterfinals
1/WC	(United States) A Agassi	6	6
8	(South Africa) M Ondruska	0	4
3	(Brazil) J Oncins	3	0
6	(United States) J Tarango	6	6

Semifinals
1/WC	(United States) A Agassi	6	6
6	(United States) J Tarango	3	3

=== Bottom half ===
First round
5	(United States) J Grabb	7^{7}	3	6^{4}
(United States) B Shelton	6^{4}	6	7^{7}
(United States) J Connors	6	6
(United States) R Matuszewski	4	4
Q	(United States) D Witt	7	3	6^{5}
(United States) A O'Brien	5	6	7^{7}
(United States) C Adams	6	6
4	(Italy) R Furlan	4	4
7	(United States) R Reneberg	6	6
(Netherlands) J Eltingh	1	1
Q	(United States) D Randall	6	7^{7}
(Australia) R Fromberg	4	6^{3}
(United States) D Rostagno	7^{7}	7^{7}
Q	(United States) K Thorne	6^{5}	6^{3}
(New Zealand) B Steven	1	4
2	(United States) B Gilbert	6	6

Second round
(United States) B Shelton	4	7^{7}	4
(United States) J Connors	6	6^{4}	6
(United States) A O'Brien	6^{4}	2
(United States) C Adams	7^{7}	6
7	(United States) R Reneberg	6^{5}	6	6
Q	(United States) D Randall	7^{7}	2	2
(United States) D Rostagno	6	3	6^{2}
2	(United States) B Gilbert	3	6	7^{7}

Quarterfinals
(United States) J Connors	6	4	6
(United States) C Adams	3	6	4
7	(United States) R Reneberg	7	6^{7}	2
2	(United States) B Gilbert	5	7^{9}	6

Semifinals
(United States) J Connors	1	4^{r}
2	(United States) B Gilbert	6	1
