= 1995 Sybase Open – Singles =

Singles
- 1995 Sybase Open

Final
- Champion: (United States) Andre Agassi
- Runner-up: (United States) Michael Chang
- Score: 6–2, 1–6, 6–3

Details
- Draw: 32 (4Q / 3WC)
- Seeds: 8

Events
Singles	Doubles
← 1994 ·	Pacific Coast Championships	· 1996 →

Renzo Furlan was the defending champion, but did not participate.

Andre Agassi won the title, defeating Michael Chang 6–2, 1–6, 6–3 in the final.

== Seeds ==
1. (United States) Andre Agassi (champion)
2. (United States) Michael Chang (final)
3. (United States) Jim Courier (semifinals)
4. (France) Arnaud Boetsch (first round)
5. (United States) MaliVai Washington (semifinals)
6. (United States) Patrick McEnroe (second round)
7. (United States) Richey Reneberg (first round)
8. (Uruguay) Marcelo Filippini (first round)

== Draw ==
=== Key ===
- Q = Qualifier
- WC = Wild card
- LL = Lucky loser
- Alt = Alternate
- SE = Special exempt
- PR = Protected ranking
- ITF = ITF entry
- JE = Junior exempt
- w/o = Walkover
- r = Retired
- d = Defaulted
- SR = Special ranking

=== Finals ===
Semifinals
1	(United States) Andre Agassi	6	6
5	(United States) MaliVai Washington	4	2
3	(United States) Jim Courier	6	6^{5}	4
2	(United States) Michael Chang	4	7^{7}	6

Final
1	(United States) Andre Agassi	6	1	6
2	(United States) Michael Chang	2	6	3

=== Top half ===
First round
1	(United States) A Agassi	6	6
(Brazil) F Meligeni	0	2
(Germany) M-K Goellner	7^{14}	6
(Norway) C Ruud	6^{12}	2
Q	(United States) K Thorne	5	7	7^{7}
(Australia) J Morgan	7	5	6^{3}
WC	(United States) B MacPhie	6	2	6
8	(Uruguay) M Filippini	2	6	3
4	(France) A Boetsch	4	6^{7}
(United States) B Shelton	6	7^{9}
(Italy) D Nargiso	6	7^{7}
WC	(United States) S Humphries	3	6^{4}
(Germany) L Rehmann	6	2	6
Q	(United States) R Matuszewski	4	6	4
(United States) B Gilbert	6^{2}	4
5	(United States) M Washington	7^{7}	6

Second round
1	(United States) A Agassi	7^{7}	6
(Germany) M-K Goellner	6^{4}	2
Q	(United States) K Thorne	3	4
WC	(United States) B MacPhie	6	6
(United States) B Shelton	7^{11}	7^{7}
(Italy) D Nargiso	6^{9}	6^{4}
(Germany) L Rehmann	2	2
5	(United States) M Washington	6	6

Quarterfinals
1	(United States) A Agassi	6	6
WC	(United States) B MacPhie	4	3
(United States) B Shelton	2	1
5	(United States) M Washington	6	6

Semifinals
1	(United States) A Agassi	6	6
5	(United States) M Washington	4	2

=== Bottom half ===
First round
6	(United States) P McEnroe	7^{9}	6
Q	(South Africa) C van Rensburg	6^{7}	4
(United States) J Grabb	7	6
(United States) J Tarango	5	4
(Venezuela) N Pereira	7	6
(United States) A O'Brien	5	4
Q	(United States) S Campbell	2	4
3	(United States) J Courier	6	6
7	(United States) R Reneberg	3	4
(Canada) G Rusedski	6	6
(Brazil) L Mattar	4	2
(Sweden) A Järryd	6	6
WC	(United States) J Salzenstein	1	1
(United States) J Stark	6	6
(Chile) M Ríos	4	5
2	(United States) M Chang	6	7

Second round
6	(United States) P McEnroe	5	7^{8}	3
(United States) J Grabb	7	6^{6}	6
(Venezuela) N Pereira	4	1
3	(United States) J Courier	6	6
(Canada) G Rusedski	6^{3}	6	6
(Sweden) A Järryd	7^{7}	0	4
(United States) J Stark	5	4
2	(United States) M Chang	7	6

Quarterfinals
(United States) J Grabb	1	6^{5}
3	(United States) J Courier	6	7^{7}
(Canada) G Rusedski	6^{6}	6^{8}
2	(United States) M Chang	7^{8}	7^{10}

Semifinals
3	(United States) J Courier	6	6^{5}	4
2	(United States) M Chang	4	7^{7}	6
