= 1999 Sybase Open – Doubles =

Doubles
- 1999 Sybase Open

Final
- Champions: (Australia) Mark Woodforde (Australia) Todd Woodbridge
- Runners-up: (North Macedonia) Aleksandar Kitinov (Socialist Federal Republic of Yugoslavia) Nenad Zimonjić
- Score: 7–5, 6–7, 6–4

Details
- Draw: 16
- Seeds: 4

Events
Singles	Doubles
← 1998 ·	Pacific Coast Championships	· 2000 →

The 1999 Sybase Open was a men's tennis tournament played on indoor hard courts at the San Jose Arena in San Jose, California in the United States and was part of the ATP World Series of the 1999 ATP Tour. It was the 110th edition of the tournament ran from February 8 through February 14, 1999.

== Seeds ==
Champion seeds are indicated in bold text while text in italics indicates the round in which those seeds were eliminated.

1. (Australia) **Todd Woodbridge** / (Australia) **Mark Woodforde (champions)**
2. (United States) Jim Grabb / (United States) Richey Reneberg (quarterfinals)
3. (United States) Alex O'Brien / (United States) Jared Palmer (semifinals)
4. (United States) Brandon Coupe / (Mexico) David Roditi (quarterfinals)

== Draw ==
=== Key ===
- Q = Qualifier
- WC = Wild card
- LL = Lucky loser
- Alt = Alternate
- SE = Special exempt
- PR = Protected ranking
- ITF = ITF entry
- JE = Junior exempt
- w/o = Walkover
- r = Retired
- d = Defaulted
- SR = Special ranking

=== Finals ===
First round
1	(Australia) **T Woodbridge** **(Australia) M Woodforde**	**6**	**6**
(United States) J Courier (United States) P Galbraith	2	4
(South Africa) **G Stafford** **(South Africa) B Talbot**	**6**	**6**
(South Africa) P Rosner (United States) J Waite	4	4
4	(United States) **B Coupe** **(Mexico) D Roditi**	**7**	6	**7**
(South Africa) B Haygarth (United States) TJ Middleton	5	**7**	5
(United States) **D DiLucia** **(United States) M Sell**	**6**	5	**6**
(New Zealand) J Greenhalgh (New Zealand) B Steven	3	**7**	2
(Brazil) **F Meligeni** **(Argentina) M Puerta**	**6**	**6**
(United States) J-M Gambill (United States) T Gambill	4	4
3	(United States) **A O'Brien** **(United States) J Palmer**	**6**	**6**
(United States) D Bowen (United States) E Taino	3	4
(North Macedonia) **A Kitinov** **(Socialist Federal Republic of Yugoslavia) N Zimonjić**	**6**	4	**7**
(United States) J Gimelstob (United States) B MacPhie	4	**6**	6
2	(United States) **Jim Grabb** **(United States) R Reneberg**	**6**	**6**
(United States) B Bryan (United States) M Bryan	4	4

Quarterfinals
1	(Australia) **T Woodbridge** **(Australia) M Woodforde**	**6**	3	**6**
(South Africa) G Stafford (South Africa) B Talbot	4	**6**	3
4	(United States) B Coupe (Mexico) D Roditi	5	4
(United States) **D DiLucia** **(United States) M Sell**	**7**	**6**
(Brazil) F Meligeni (Argentina) M Puerta	**7**	4	2
3	(United States) **A O'Brien** **(United States) J Palmer**	6	**6**	**6**
(North Macedonia) **A Kitinov** **(Socialist Federal Republic of Yugoslavia) N Zimonjić**	4	**6**	**6**
2	(United States) Jim Grabb (United States) R Reneberg	**6**	1	4

Semifinals
1	(Australia) **T Woodbridge** **(Australia) M Woodforde**	**6**	**6**
(United States) D DiLucia (United States) M Sell	4	1
3	(United States) A O'Brien (United States) J Palmer	3	**7**	5
(North Macedonia) **A Kitinov** **(Socialist Federal Republic of Yugoslavia) N Zimonjić**	**6**	6	**7**

Final
1	(Australia) **T Woodbridge** **(Australia) M Woodforde**	**7**	6	**6**
(North Macedonia) A Kitinov (Socialist Federal Republic of Yugoslavia) N Zimonjić	5	**7**	4
