= 1996 Sybase Open – Doubles =

Doubles
- 1996 Sybase Open

Final
- Champions: (United States) Trevor Kronemann (Australia) David Macpherson
- Runners-up: (United States) Richey Reneberg (United States) Jonathan Stark
- Score: 6–4, 3–6, 6–3

Details
- Draw: 16
- Seeds: 4

Events
Singles	Doubles
← 1995 ·	Pacific Coast Championships	· 1997 →

Jim Grabb and Patrick McEnroe were the defending champions but did not compete that year.

Trevor Kronemann and David Macpherson won in the final 6–4, 3–6, 6–3 against Richey Reneberg and Jonathan Stark.

== Seeds ==
Champion seeds are indicated in bold text while text in italics indicates the round in which those seeds were eliminated.

1. (United States) Tommy Ho / (New Zealand) Brett Steven (first round)
2. (United States) Rick Leach / (United States) Scott Melville (semifinals)
3. (United States) Richey Reneberg / (United States) Jonathan Stark (final)
4. (United States) **Trevor Kronemann** / (Australia) **David Macpherson (champions)**

== Draw ==
=== Key ===
- Q = Qualifier
- WC = Wild card
- LL = Lucky loser
- Alt = Alternate
- SE = Special exempt
- PR = Protected ranking
- ITF = ITF entry
- JE = Junior exempt
- w/o = Walkover
- r = Retired
- d = Defaulted
- SR = Special ranking

First round
1	(United States) T Ho (New Zealand) B Steven
WC	(United States) **K Flach** (United States) **K Jones**	**w/o**
LL	(United Kingdom) **G Rusedski** (United States) **V Spadea**	**6**	**7**
Q	(Sweden) R Bergh (Sweden) D Ekerot	3	6
4	(United States) **T Kronemann** (Australia) **D Macpherson**	**6**	**7**
LL	(United States) M Chinchiolo (United States) B Coupe	3	6
(Netherlands) **T Nijssen** (United States) **G Van Emburgh**	**7**	4	**7**
(United States) S Davis (Canada) G Michibata	6	**6**	5
WC	(United States) B Gilbert (Canada) B Mahal	3	2
(Venezuela) **N Pereira** (Australia) **M Tebbutt**	**6**	**6**
(United States) K Kinnear (United States) D Randall	6	3
3	(United States) **R Reneberg** (United States) **J Stark**	**7**	**6**
(United States) L Jensen (United States) M Jensen	**7**	4	2
(United States) **M Lucena** (United States) **J Waite**	5	**6**	**6**
(Spain) J A Conde (Portugal) N Marques	6	4
2	(United States) **R Leach** (United States) **S Melville**	**7**	**6**

Quarterfinals
WC	(United States) **K Flach** (United States) **K Jones**	**6**	**6**
LL	(United Kingdom) G Rusedski (United States) V Spadea	2	4
4	(United States) **T Kronemann** (Australia) **D Macpherson**	**6**	**6**
(Netherlands) T Nijssen (United States) G Van Emburgh	1	3
(Venezuela) N Pereira (Australia) M Tebbutt	2	2
3	(United States) **R Reneberg** (United States) **J Stark**	**6**	**6**
(United States) M Lucena (United States) J Waite	**6**	3	6
2	(United States) **R Leach** (United States) **S Melville**	4	**6**	**7**

Semifinals
WC	(United States) K Flach (United States) K Jones	6	1
4	(United States) **T Kronemann** (Australia) **D Macpherson**	**7**	**6**
3	(United States) **R Reneberg** (United States) **J Stark**	**6**	2	**6**
2	(United States) R Leach (United States) S Melville	2	**6**	3

Final
4	(United States) **Trevor Kronemann** (Australia) **David Macpherson**	**6**	3	**6**
3	(United States) Richey Reneberg (United States) Jonathan Stark	4	**6**	3
