= 1994 San Jose Open – Doubles =

Doubles
- 1994 San Jose Open

Final
- Champions: (United States) Rick Leach (United States) Jared Palmer
- Runners-up: (Zimbabwe) Byron Black (United States) Jonathan Stark
- Score: 4–6, 6–4, 6–4

Details
- Draw: 16
- Seeds: 4

Events
Singles	Doubles
← 1993 ·	Pacific Coast Championships	· 1995 →

Scott Davis and Jacco Eltingh were the defending champions, but Eltingh did not compete this year. Davis teamed up with David Pate and lost in the first round to Brian Devening and Jaime Oncins.

Rick Leach and Jared Palmer won the title by defeating Byron Black and Jonathan Stark 4–6, 6–4, 6–4 in the final.

== Seeds ==
1. (Zimbabwe) Byron Black / (United States) Jonathan Stark (final)
2. (United States) Rick Leach / (United States) Jared Palmer (champions)
3. (United States) Steve DeVries / (Australia) David Macpherson (first round)
4. (Australia) Sandon Stolle / (Australia) Laurie Warder (quarterfinals)

== Draw ==
=== Key ===
- Q = Qualifier
- WC = Wild card
- LL = Lucky loser
- Alt = Alternate
- SE = Special exempt
- PR = Protected ranking
- ITF = ITF entry
- JE = Junior exempt
- w/o = Walkover
- r = Retired
- d = Defaulted
- SR = Special ranking

=== Draw ===
First round
1	(Zimbabwe) B Black (United States) J Stark	6	6	7
(United States) P Annacone (United States) A O'Brien	3	7	6
(United States) S Davis (United States) D Pate	6	2
(United States) B Devening (Brazil) J Oncins	7	6
3	(United States) S DeVries (Australia) D Macpherson	6	4	6
Q	(France) JP Fleurian (The Bahamas) R Smith	3	6	7
(United States) F Montana (United States) J Pugh	3	6	7
(Zimbabwe) K Ullyett (South Africa) D Visser	6	4	6
WC	(United States) B Gilbert (United States) B MacPhie	4	6	4
(United States) M Bauer (United States) B Shelton	6	3	6
(United States) B Garnett (United States) TJ Middleton	4	4
4	(Australia) S Stolle (Australia) L Warder	6	6
WC	(United States) J Connors (United Kingdom) J Lloyd	1	3
(United States) J Grabb (United States) R Reneberg	6	6
(United States) M Keil (United States) T Kronemann	6	1	4
2	(United States) R Leach (United States) J Palmer	4	6	6

Quarterfinals
1	(Zimbabwe) B Black (United States) J Stark	5	7	6
(United States) B Devening (Brazil) J Oncins	7	5	3
Q	(France) JP Fleurian (The Bahamas) R Smith	4	2
(United States) F Montana (United States) J Pugh	6	6
(United States) M Bauer (United States) B Shelton	6	7
4	(Australia) S Stolle (Australia) L Warder	1	6
(United States) J Grabb (United States) R Reneberg	3	4
2	(United States) R Leach (United States) J Palmer	6	6

Semifinals
1	(Zimbabwe) B Black (United States) J Stark	6	6
(United States) F Montana (United States) J Pugh	3	4
(United States) M Bauer (United States) B Shelton	3	5
2	(United States) R Leach (United States) J Palmer	6	7

Final
1	(Zimbabwe) B Black (United States) J Stark	6	4	4
2	(United States) R Leach (United States) J Palmer	4	6	6
