= 1995 Sybase Open – Doubles =

Doubles
- 1995 Sybase Open

Final
- Champions: (United States) Jim Grabb (United States) Patrick McEnroe
- Runners-up: (United States) Alex O'Brien (Australia) Sandon Stolle
- Score: 3–6, 7–5, 6–0

Details
- Draw: 16
- Seeds: 4

Events
Singles	Doubles
← 1994 ·	Pacific Coast Championships	· 1996 →

Rick Leach and Jared Palmer were the defending champions, but Palmer did not compete this year. Leach teamed up with Scott Melville and lost in the quarterfinals to Kelly Jones and David Pate.

Jim Grabb and Patrick McEnroe won the title by defeating Alex O'Brien and Sandon Stolle 3–6, 7–5, 6–0 in the final.

== Seeds ==
1. (United States) Alex O'Brien / (Australia) Sandon Stolle (final)
2. (United States) Jim Grabb / (United States) Patrick McEnroe (champions)
3. (United States) Rick Leach / (United States) Scott Melville (quarterfinals)
4. (United States) Trevor Kronemann / (Australia) David Macpherson (quarterfinals)

== Draw ==
=== Key ===
- Q = Qualifier
- WC = Wild card
- LL = Lucky loser
- Alt = Alternate
- SE = Special exempt
- PR = Protected ranking
- ITF = ITF entry
- JE = Junior exempt
- w/o = Walkover
- r = Retired
- d = Defaulted
- SR = Special ranking

=== Draw ===
First round
1	(United States) A O'Brien (Australia) S Stolle	7	7
(United States) L Jensen (United States) M Jensen	5	6
(United States) M Bauer (Germany) MK Goellner	7	6	6
(United States) S Davis (United States) B MacPhie	5	7	4
4	(United States) T Kronemann (Australia) D Macpherson	7	6
WC	(South Africa) C van Rensburg (South Africa) D Visser	6	3
(United States) D Flach (Italy) D Nargiso	5	4
Q	(Canada) G Rusedski (Sweden) LA Wahlgren	7	6
WC	(United States) K Jones (United States) D Pate	6	6	6
(South Africa) E Ferreira (United States) D Randall	3	7	3
(United Kingdom) N Broad (United States) G Van Emburgh	4	3
3	(United States) R Leach (United States) S Melville	6	6
WC	(United States) B Coupe (United States) M Lucena	7	3	3
(South Africa) B Haygarth (South Africa) B Talbot	6	6	6
(Sweden) R Bergh (Sweden) A Järryd	3	6
2	(United States) J Grabb (United States) P McEnroe	6	7

Quarterfinals
1	(United States) A O'Brien (Australia) S Stolle	6	7
(United States) M Bauer (Germany) MK Goellner	3	5
4	(United States) T Kronemann (Australia) D Macpherson	3	2
Q	(Canada) G Rusedski (Sweden) LA Wahlgren	6	6
WC	(United States) K Jones (United States) D Pate	7	6	6
3	(United States) R Leach (United States) S Melville	5	7	3
(South Africa) B Haygarth (South Africa) B Talbot	3	0
2	(United States) J Grabb (United States) P McEnroe	6	6

Semifinals
1	(United States) A O'Brien (Australia) S Stolle	6	6
Q	(Canada) G Rusedski (Sweden) LA Wahlgren	3	2
WC	(United States) K Jones (United States) D Pate	6	3
2	(United States) J Grabb (United States) P McEnroe	7	6

Final
1	(United States) A O'Brien (Australia) S Stolle	6	5	0
2	(United States) J Grabb (United States) P McEnroe	3	7	6
