= 1993 Volvo Tennis San Francisco – Doubles =

Doubles
- 1993 Volvo Tennis San Francisco

Final
- Champions: (United States) Scott Davis (Netherlands) Jacco Eltingh
- Runners-up: (United States) Patrick McEnroe (United States) Jonathan Stark
- Score: 6–1, 4–6, 7–5

Details
- Draw: 16
- Seeds: 4

Events
Singles	Doubles
← 1992 ·	Pacific Coast Championships	· 1994 →

Jim Grabb and Richey Reneberg were the defending champions, but lost in the quarterfinals to Luke Jensen and Murphy Jensen.

Scott Davis and Jacco Eltingh won the title by defeating Patrick McEnroe and Jonathan Stark 6–1, 4–6, 7–5 in the final.

== Seeds ==
1. (United States) Jim Grabb / (United States) Richey Reneberg (quarterfinals)
2. (United States) Patrick McEnroe / (United States) Jonathan Stark (final)
3. (United States) Mike Briggs / (United States) Trevor Kronemann (first round)
4. (United States) Kent Kinnear / (United States) Sven Salumaa (semifinals)

== Draw ==
=== Key ===
- Q = Qualifier
- WC = Wild card
- LL = Lucky loser
- Alt = Alternate
- SE = Special exempt
- PR = Protected ranking
- ITF = ITF entry
- JE = Junior exempt
- w/o = Walkover
- r = Retired
- d = Defaulted
- SR = Special ranking

=== Draw ===
First round
1	(United States) J Grabb (United States) R Reneberg	3	7	6
Q	(Sweden) C Allgårdh (United States) D Eisenman	6	6	3
(United States) L Jensen (United States) M Jensen	2	6	7
(United States) J Pugh (United States) J Palmer	6	4	5
3	(United States) M Briggs (United States) T Kronemann	6	3	6
(South Africa) G Muller (South Africa) M Ondruska	3	6	7
(United States) S Davis (Netherlands) J Eltingh	6	6
WC	(Sweden) B Borg (United Kingdom) J Lloyd	3	2
WC	(United States) A O'Brien (United States) D Rostagno	5	6	1
Q	(United States) B Shelton (United States) K Thorne	7	4	6
(Australia) N Borwick (Australia) S Youl	4	6	6
4	(United States) K Kinnear (United States) S Salumaa	6	4	7
(United States) M Keil (United States) D Randall	7	3	6
(United Kingdom) N Broad (South Africa) S Kruger	6	6	3
(Canada) G Michibata (United States) D Pate	6	3	4
2	(United States) P McEnroe (United States) J Stark	3	6	6

Quarterfinals
1	(United States) J Grabb (United States) R Reneberg	6	3
(United States) L Jensen (United States) M Jensen	7	6
(South Africa) G Muller (South Africa) M Ondruska
(United States) S Davis (Netherlands) J Eltingh	w	/	o
Q	(United States) B Shelton (United States) K Thorne	4	6	4
4	(United States) K Kinnear (United States) S Salumaa	6	3	6
(United States) M Keil (United States) D Randall	6	2	6
2	(United States) P McEnroe (United States) J Stark	4	6	7

Semifinals
(United States) L Jensen (United States) M Jensen	6	5	6
(United States) S Davis (Netherlands) J Eltingh	2	7	7
4	(United States) K Kinnear (United States) S Salumaa	2	0
2	(United States) P McEnroe (United States) J Stark	6	6

Final
(United States) S Davis (Netherlands) J Eltingh	6	4	7
2	(United States) P McEnroe (United States) J Stark	1	6	5
