= 1994 San Jose Open =

- Date: January 31 – February 7
- Edition: 106th
- Category: World Series
- Draw: 32S / 16D
- Prize money: $288,750
- Surface: Hard / indoor
- Location: San Jose, U.S.

Champions

Singles
- (Italy) Renzo Furlan

Doubles
- (United States) Rick Leach / (United States) Jared Palmer
← 1993 ·	Pacific Coast Championships	· 1995 →

The 1994 San Jose Open was a men's tennis tournament in San Jose, California, in the United States and was part of the World Series of the 1994 ATP Tour. It was the 106th edition of tournament and was held from January 31 through February 7, 1994. The competition switched location from San Francisco, where it had been held for 21 years. Sixth-seeded Renzo Furlan won the singles title.

== Finals ==
=== Singles ===
(Italy) Renzo Furlan defeated (United States) Michael Chang, 3–6, 6–3, 7–5

- It was Furlan's first career title.

=== Doubles ===
(United States) Rick Leach / (United States) Jared Palmer defeated (Zimbabwe) Byron Black / (United States) Jonathan Stark, 4–6, 6–4, 6–4
