= 2001 Sybase Open – Doubles =

Doubles
- 2001 Sybase Open

Final
- Champions: (The Bahamas) Mark Knowles (United States) Brian MacPhie
- Runners-up: (United States) Jan-Michael Gambill (United States) Jonathan Stark
- Score: 6–3, 7–6^{(7–4)}

Details
- Draw: 16
- Seeds: 4

Events
Singles	Doubles
← 2000 ·	Pacific Coast Championships	· 2002 →

Jan-Michael Gambill and Scott Humphries were the defending champions but they competed with different partners that year, Gambill with Jonathan Stark and Humphries with Justin Gimelstob.

Gimelstob and Humphries lost in the quarterfinals to Simon Aspelin and Johan Landsberg.

Gambill and Stark lost in the final 6–3, 7–6^{(7–4)} against Mark Knowles and Brian MacPhie.

== Seeds ==
Champion seeds are indicated in bold text while text in italics indicates the round in which those seeds were eliminated.

1. (Canada) Sébastien Lareau / (United States) Alex O'Brien (quarterfinals)
2. (United States) Justin Gimelstob / (United States) Scott Humphries (quarterfinals)
3. (South Africa) Neville Godwin / (United States) Rick Leach (quarterfinals)
4. (The Bahamas) **Mark Knowles** / (United States) **Brian MacPhie (champions)**

== Draw ==
=== Key ===
- Q = Qualifier
- WC = Wild card
- LL = Lucky loser
- Alt = Alternate
- SE = Special exempt
- PR = Protected ranking
- ITF = ITF entry
- JE = Junior exempt
- w/o = Walkover
- r = Retired
- d = Defaulted
- SR = Special ranking

First round
1	(Canada) **S Lareau** (United States) **A O'Brien**	**6**	**7**
WC	(United States) L Jensen (United States) M Jensen	2	5
(United States) **J Palmer** (United States) **C Woodruff**	**6**	**6**
(United States) B Bryan (United States) M Bryan	4	3
4	(The Bahamas) **M Knowles** (United States) **B MacPhie**	**6**	**7^{8}**
(Japan) T Shimada (South Africa) M Wakefield	2	6^{6}
WC	(United States) **P Goldstein** (United States) **J Thomas**	3	**7**	**6**
(Australia) W Arthurs (Australia) B Ellwood	**6**	5	3
(United States) **J-M Gambill** (United States) **J Stark**	**6**	6^{7}	**6**
(Spain) J Balcells (Australia) A Kratzmann	3	**7^{9}**	3
WC	(Germany) T Haas (United States) G Weiner	1	6^{5}
3	(South Africa) **N Godwin** (United States) **R Leach**	**6**	**7^{7}**
(Australia) D Macpherson (South Africa) G Stafford	6^{3}	3
(Sweden) **S Aspelin** (Sweden) **J Landsberg**	**7^{7}**	**6**
Q	(Israel) H Levy (Brazil) A Sá	3	6^{4}
2	(United States) **J Gimelstob** (United States) **S Humphries**	**6**	**7^{7}**

Quarterfinals
1	(Canada) S Lareau (United States) A O'Brien	3	3
(United States) **J Palmer** (United States) **C Woodruff**	**6**	**6**
4	(The Bahamas) **M Knowles** (United States) **B MacPhie**	**6**	2	**6**
WC	(United States) P Goldstein (United States) J Thomas	3	**6**	3
(United States) **J-M Gambill** (United States) **J Stark**	**6**	1	**6**
3	(South Africa) N Godwin (United States) R Leach	1	**6**	3
(Sweden) **S Aspelin** (Sweden) **J Landsberg**	**6**	**7^{10}**
2	(United States) J Gimelstob (United States) S Humphries	3	6^{8}

Semifinals
(United States) J Palmer (United States) C Woodruff	6^{2}	3
4	(The Bahamas) **M Knowles** (United States) **B MacPhie**	**7^{7}**	**6**
(United States) **J-M Gambill** (United States) **J Stark**	**7^{7}**	**7^{8}**
(Sweden) S Aspelin (Sweden) J Landsberg	6^{4}	6^{6}

Final
4	(The Bahamas) **Mark Knowles** (United States) **Brian MacPhie**	**6**	**7^{7}**
(United States) Jan-Michael Gambill (United States) Jonathan Stark	3	6^{4}
