= 2000 Sybase Open – Singles =

Singles
- 2000 Sybase Open

Final
- Champion: (Australia) Mark Philippoussis
- Runner-up: (Sweden) Mikael Tillström
- Score: 7–5, 4–6, 6–3

Details
- Draw: 32 (4Q / 3WC)
- Seeds: 8

Events
Singles	Doubles
← 1999 ·	Pacific Coast Championships	· 2001 →

Mark Philippoussis was the defending champion and successfully defended his title, by defeating Mikael Tillström 7–5, 4–6, 6–3 in the final.

== Seeds ==
1. (n/a)
2. (Australia) Mark Philippoussis (champion)
3. (n/a)
4. (United States) Michael Chang (quarterfinals)
5. (United States) Jim Courier (semifinals)
6. (Argentina) Franco Squillari (first round)
7. (South Africa) Wayne Ferreira (semifinals)
8. (United States) Jan-Michael Gambill (first round)

== Draw ==
=== Key ===
- Q = Qualifier
- WC = Wild card
- LL = Lucky loser
- Alt = Alternate
- SE = Special exempt
- PR = Protected ranking
- ITF = ITF entry
- JE = Junior exempt
- w/o = Walkover
- r = Retired
- d = Defaulted
- SR = Special ranking

=== Finals ===
Semifinals
7	(South Africa) Wayne Ferreira	6^{7}	6	3
(Sweden) Mikael Tillström	7^{9}	2	6
5	(United States) Jim Courier	6	3	4
2	(Australia) Mark Philippoussis	4	6	6

Final
(Sweden) Mikael Tillström	5	6	3
2	(Australia) Mark Philippoussis	7	4	6

=== Top half ===
First round
LL	(United States) S Humphries	4	4
WC	(Australia) M Woodforde	6	6
(Argentina) M Rodríguez	2	1
(Sweden) M Larsson	6	6
(Italy) L Tieleman	5	3
Q	(Finland) V Liukko	7	6
Q	(United States) J Salzenstein	4	4
7	(South Africa) W Ferreira	6	6
4	(United States) M Chang	7	6
(Thailand) P Srichaphan	5	4
(Spain) J Alonso	4	4
(Philippines) M Mamiit	6	6
(Armenia) S Sargsian	6	6
(Netherlands) J van Lottum	2	3
(Sweden) M Tillström	7	7
6	(Argentina) F Squillari	5	5

Second round
WC	(Australia) M Woodforde	3	6	3
(Sweden) M Larsson	6	3	6
Q	(Finland) V Liukko	3	3
7	(South Africa) W Ferreira	6	6
4	(United States) M Chang	6	6
(Philippines) M Mamiit	2	3
(Armenia) S Sargsian	6	6^{3}	4
(Sweden) M Tillström	4	7^{7}	6

Quarterfinals
(Sweden) M Larsson	6	3	4
7	(South Africa) W Ferreira	4	6	6
4	(United States) M Chang	6	3	3
(Sweden) M Tillström	2	6	6

Semifinals
7	(South Africa) W Ferreira	6^{7}	6	3
(Sweden) M Tillström	7^{9}	2	6

=== Bottom half ===
First round
5	(United States) J Courier	6	6
Q	(United States) E Taino	3	4
(Argentina) H Gumy	6	6
WC	(Australia) T Woodbridge	4	2
(United States) P Goldstein	6	7^{7}
Q	(United States) J Blake	3	6^{4}
(Australia) R Fromberg	6^{5}	6	4
LL	(Belgium) X Malisse	7^{7}	0	6
8	(United States) JM Gambill	6^{2}	2
(United States) J Gimelstob	7^{7}	6
(Chile) N Massú	4	2
(Czech Republic) T Zíb	6	6
(Haiti) R Agénor	7	6
WC	(United States) P King	5	2
(Argentina) G Cañas	6^{8}	6	6^{3}
2	(Australia) M Philippoussis	7^{10}	4	7^{7}

Second round
5	(United States) J Courier	7	6^{2}	7^{7}
(Argentina) H Gumy	5	7^{7}	6^{4}
(United States) P Goldstein	6	3	7
LL	(Belgium) X Malisse	2	6	5
(United States) J Gimelstob	6	7^{7}
(Czech Republic) T Zíb	4	6^{4}
(Haiti) R Agénor	3	4
2	(Australia) M Philippoussis	6	6

Quarterfinals
5	(United States) J Courier	6	6
(United States) P Goldstein	4	4
(United States) J Gimelstob	6^{5}	4
2	(Australia) M Philippoussis	7^{7}	6

Semifinals
5	(United States) J Courier	6	3	4
2	(Australia) M Philippoussis	4	6	6
