= 1997 Sybase Open – Singles =

Singles
- 1997 Sybase Open

Final
- Champion: (United States) Pete Sampras
- Runner-up: (United Kingdom) Greg Rusedski
- Score: 3–6, 5–0 (Rusedski retired)

Details
- Draw: 32 (4Q / 3WC)
- Seeds: 8

Events
Singles	Doubles
← 1996 ·	Pacific Coast Championships	· 1998 →

Pete Sampras was the defending champion and won the final 3–6, 5–0 after Greg Rusedski was forced to retire.

== Seeds ==
A champion seed is indicated in bold text while text in italics indicates the round in which that seed was eliminated.

1. (United States) **Pete Sampras (champion)**
2. (United States) Michael Chang (quarterfinals)
3. (United States) Andre Agassi (semifinals)
4. (United States) Todd Martin (semifinals)
5. n/a
6. (United States) Richey Reneberg (quarterfinals)
7. (United Kingdom) Greg Rusedski (final)
8. (United States) Chris Woodruff (quarterfinals)

== Draw ==
=== Key ===
- Q = Qualifier
- WC = Wild card
- LL = Lucky loser
- Alt = Alternate
- SE = Special exempt
- PR = Protected ranking
- ITF = ITF entry
- JE = Junior exempt
- w/o = Walkover
- r = Retired
- d = Defaulted
- SR = Special ranking

First round
1	(United States) **P Sampras**	**7^{7}**	**6**
(Germany) A Rădulescu	6^{3}	3
(United States) M Joyce	4	3
WC	(United States) **J Gimelstob**	**6**	**6**
(New Zealand) **B Steven**	**6**	**7**
(Venezuela) N Pereira	1	5
(France) J-P Fleurian	2	3
8	(United States) **C Woodruff**	**6**	**6**
WC/4	(United States) **T Martin**	**6**	**6**
(United States) S Bryan	1	4
(France) G Raoux	5	6^{5}
Q	(United States) **J Grabb**	**7**	**7^{7}**
(Uruguay) M Filippini	3	1
(United States) **J Stark**	**6**	**6**
(Canada) S Lareau	3	**7**	4
6	(United States) **R Reneberg**	**6**	5	**6**
LL	(United States) B MacPhie	4	2
Q	(Australia) **G Doyle**	**6**	**6**
(United States) **J Tarango**	**6**	**6**
Q	(United States) T Ho	3	4
(Sweden) **M Norman**	**7^{7}**	**6**
LL	(United States) C Mamiit	6^{4}	0
(The Bahamas) M Knowles	4	**6**	2
3	(United States) **A Agassi**	**6**	4	**6**
7	(United Kingdom) **G Rusedski**	**6**	**6**
(Mexico) A Hernández	3	4
WC	(United States) R Wolters	0	1
(Canada) **D Nestor**	**6**	**6**
(Ecuador) N Lapentti	4	1
(Armenia) **S Sargsian**	**6**	**6**
Q	(United States) M Washington	2	0
2	(United States) **M Chang**	**6**	**6**

Second round
1	(United States) **P Sampras**	**6**	**6**
WC	(United States) J Gimelstob	2	3
(New Zealand) B Steven	3	**6**	3
8	(United States) **C Woodruff**	**6**	4	**6**
WC/4	(United States) **T Martin**	**6**	**7^{7}**
Q	(United States) J Grabb	3	6^{5}
(United States) J Stark	**6**	4	6^{7}
6	(United States) **R Reneberg**	3	**6**	**7^{9}**
Q	(Australia) **G Doyle**	**6**	**7**
(United States) J Tarango	4	5
(Sweden) M Norman	**6**	6^{4}	3
3	(United States) **A Agassi**	4	**7^{7}**	**6**
7	(United Kingdom) **G Rusedski**	**6**	**6**
(Canada) D Nestor	3	3
(Armenia) S Sargsian	3	4
2	(United States) **M Chang**	**6**	**6**

Quarterfinals
1	(United States) **P Sampras**	**6**	**6**
8	(United States) C Woodruff	2	3
WC/4	(United States) **T Martin**	**6**	**6**
6	(United States) R Reneberg	1	4
Q	(Australia) G Doyle	2	1
3	(United States) **A Agassi**	**6**	**6**
7	(United Kingdom) **G Rusedski**	**7^{7}**	**6**
2	(United States) M Chang	6^{4}	4

Semifinals
1	(United States) **P Sampras**	**6**	**6**
WC/4	(United States) T Martin	2	3
3	(United States) A Agassi	3	4
7	(United Kingdom) **G Rusedski**	**6**	**6**

Final
1	(United States) **Pete Sampras**	3	**5**
7	(United Kingdom) Greg Rusedski	**6**	0	r
