= 2001 Sybase Open – Singles =

Singles
- 2001 Sybase Open

Final
- Champion: (United Kingdom) Greg Rusedski
- Runner-up: (United States) Andre Agassi
- Score: 6–3, 6–4

Details
- Draw: 32 (4Q / 3WC)
- Seeds: 8

Events
Singles	Doubles
← 2000 ·	Pacific Coast Championships	· 2002 →

Mark Philippoussis was the defending champion but lost in the second round to Juan Balcells.

Greg Rusedski won in the final 6–3, 6–4 against Andre Agassi.

== Seeds ==
A champion seed is indicated in bold text while text in italics indicates the round in which that seed was eliminated.

1. (United States) Andre Agassi (final)
2. (Australia) Lleyton Hewitt (quarterfinals)
3. (Australia) Mark Philippoussis (second round)
4. (Germany) Tommy Haas (quarterfinals)
5. (Netherlands) Sjeng Schalken (first round)
6. (United States) Jan-Michael Gambill (semifinals)
7. n/a
8. (United Kingdom) **Greg Rusedski (champion)**

== Draw ==
=== Key ===
- Q = Qualifier
- WC = Wild card
- LL = Lucky loser
- Alt = Alternate
- SE = Special exempt
- PR = Protected ranking
- ITF = ITF entry
- JE = Junior exempt
- w/o = Walkover
- r = Retired
- d = Defaulted
- SR = Special ranking

First round
WC/1	(United States) **A Agassi**	**7**	3	**6**
(South Korea) H-T Lee	5	**6**	3
(Switzerland) **M Kratochvil**	**6**	**6**
(Italy) D Sanguinetti	2	0
(United States) J Gimelstob	1	6^{5}
(Armenia) **S Sargsian**	**6**	**7^{7}**
(Australia) **W Arthurs**	**6**	**6**
5	(Netherlands) S Schalken	4	4
3	(Australia) **M Philippoussis**	**6**	6^{7}	**6**
(Germany) M Hantschk	3	**7^{9}**	3
SE	(Argentina) J Acasuso	5	1
(Spain) **J Balcells**	**7**	**6**
WC	(United States) **A Roddick**	**6**	**6**
(United States) C Woodruff	4	4
(Brazil) A Sá	3	**7^{7}**	3
6	(United States) **J-M Gambill**	**6**	6^{0}	**6**
LL	(United States) C Mamiit	2	2
WC	(Croatia) **G Ivanišević**	**6**	**6**
(United States) P Goldstein	3	6^{4}
Q	(Belgium) **X Malisse**	**6**	**7^{7}**
(Sweden) **M Gustafsson**	3	**6**	**6**
(Italy) A Gaudenzi	**6**	3	2
(Germany) C Vinck	4	5
4	(Germany) **T Haas**	**6**	**7**
8	(United Kingdom) **G Rusedski**	**6**	**7^{7}**
(Israel) H Levy	1	6^{4}
Q	(Italy) **R Furlan**	**6**	**7**
Q	(Czech Republic) T Zíb	2	5
(Russia) **A Stoliarov**	**6**	**6**
Q	(Paraguay) R Delgado	2	2
SE	(Canada) S Lareau	3	1
2	(Australia) **L Hewitt**	**6**	**6**

Second round
WC/1	(United States) **A Agassi**	**6**	**6**
(Switzerland) M Kratochvil	4	2
(Armenia) **S Sargsian**	**6**	6^{5}	**7^{7}**
(Australia) W Arthurs	4	**7^{7}**	6^{2}
3	(Australia) M Philippoussis	4	**7^{7}**	6^{3}
(Spain) **J Balcells**	**6**	6^{4}	**7^{7}**
WC	(United States) A Roddick	6^{5}	6^{1}
6	(United States) **J-M Gambill**	**7^{7}**	**7^{7}**
WC	(Croatia) G Ivanišević	3	4
Q	(Belgium) **X Malisse**	**6**	**6**
(Sweden) M Gustafsson	**6**	3	4
4	(Germany) **T Haas**	4	**6**	**6**
8	(United Kingdom) **G Rusedski**	**6**	**6**
Q	(Italy) R Furlan	3	2
(Russia) A Stoliarov	2	**7^{10}**	3
2	(Australia) **L Hewitt**	**6**	6^{8}	**6**

Quarterfinals
WC/1	(United States) **A Agassi**	**6**	**6**
(Armenia) S Sargsian	1	3
(Spain) J Balcells	2	0
6	(United States) **J-M Gambill**	**6**	**6**
Q	(Belgium) **X Malisse**	5	**6**	**5**
4	(Germany) T Haas	**7**	3	1/r
8	(United Kingdom) **G Rusedski**	5	**6**	**6**
2	(Australia) L Hewitt	**7**	1	4

Semifinals
WC/1	(United States) **A Agassi**	**6**	**6**
6	(United States) J-M Gambill	4	4
Q	(Belgium) X Malisse	4	2
8	(United Kingdom) **G Rusedski**	**6**	**6**

Final
WC/1	(United States) Andre Agassi	3	4
8	(United Kingdom) **Greg Rusedski**	**6**	**6**
