= 1999 Sybase Open – Singles =

Singles
- 1999 Sybase Open

Final
- Champion: (Australia) Mark Philippoussis
- Runner-up: (United States) Cecil Mamiit
- Score: 6–3, 6–2

Details
- Draw: 32 (4Q / 3WC)
- Seeds: 8

Events
Singles	Doubles
← 1998 ·	Pacific Coast Championships	· 2000 →

Andre Agassi was the defending champion, but was defaulted in his second round match against Cecil Mamiit for swearing at a line judge.

Mark Philippoussis won the title, defeating Mamiit 6–3, 6–2 in the final.

== Seeds ==
1. (United States) Pete Sampras (semifinals, withdrew because of an ankle injury)
2. (United States) Andre Agassi (second round, defaulted)
3. (Australia) Mark Philippoussis (champion)
4. (United States) Michael Chang (semifinals)
5. (Argentina) Mariano Puerta (first round)
6. (United States) Jan-Michael Gambill (first round)
7. (Argentina) Mariano Zabaleta (first round)
8. (Paraguay) Ramón Delgado (second round)

== Draw ==
=== Key ===
- Q = Qualifier
- WC = Wild card
- LL = Lucky loser
- Alt = Alternate
- SE = Special exempt
- PR = Protected ranking
- ITF = ITF entry
- JE = Junior exempt
- w/o = Walkover
- r = Retired
- d = Defaulted
- SR = Special ranking

=== Finals ===
Semifinals
1	(United States) Pete Sampras
3	(Australia) Mark Philippoussis	w/o
4	(United States) Michael Chang	6	3	4
Q	(United States) Cecil Mamiit	3	6	6

Final
3	(Australia) Mark Philippoussis	6	6
Q	(United States) Cecil Mamiit	3	2

=== Top half ===
First round
1	(United States) P Sampras	6	6
(Spain) G Blanco	4	4
(Argentina) M Rodríguez	6	6^{2}	6
Q	(Mexico) A Hernández	4	7^{7}	3
Q	(Germany) B Karbacher	6	6
(Austria) S Koubek	3	2
(Canada) S Lareau	6	6
7	(Argentina) M Zabeleta	2	1
3	(Australia) M Philippoussis	6^{2}	7	6
(Armenia) S Sargsian	7^{7}	5	3
(United States) J Courier	4	6^{4}
(Netherlands) J van Lottum	6	7^{7}
Q	(Haiti) R Agénor	6	2	3
WC	(United States) C Woodruff	2	6	6
WC	(United States) J Gimelstob	6	7^{8}
6	(United States) J-M Gambill	3	6^{6}

Second round
1	(United States) P Sampras	7	6
(Argentina) M Rodríguez	5	3
Q	(Germany) B Karbacher	6	6^{5}	6
(Canada) S Lareau	3	7^{7}	3
3	(Australia) M Philippoussis	6	6
(Netherlands) J van Lottum	2	1
WC	(United States) C Woodruff	4	6^{3}
WC	(United States) J Gimelstob	6	7^{7}

Quarterfinals
1	(United States) P Sampras	7	6
Q	(Germany) B Karbacher	5	3
3	(Australia) M Philippoussis	6	3	7^{7}
WC	(United States) J Gimelstob	2	6	6^{0}

Semifinals
1	(United States) P Sampras
3	(Australia) M Philippoussis	w/o

=== Bottom half ===
First round
5	(Argentina) M Puerta	2	6	3
(Norway) C Ruud	6	4	6
(Spain) C Costa	6	4	4
WC	(United States) P Goldstein	4	6	6
(Argentina) F Squillari	6	3	6
(Spain) A Portas	1	6	2
(Brazil) F Meligeni	3	2
4	(United States) M Chang	6	6
8	(Paraguay) R Delgado	5	6	7
(New Zealand) B Steven	7	4	5
(United States) S Campbell	3	6	5
(Australia) M Woodforde	6	3	7
Q	(United States) C Mamiit	2	6	7
(Denmark) K Carlsen	6	3	5
(Australia) T Woodbridge	2	1
2	(United States) A Agassi	6	6

Second round
(Norway) C Ruud	6	7^{7}
WC	(United States) P Goldstein	1	6^{4}
(Argentina) F Squillari	4	6^{5}
4	(United States) M Chang	6	7^{7}
8	(Paraguay) R Delgado	2	3
(Australia) M Woodforde	6	6
Q	(United States) C Mamiit	0	6
2	(United States) A Agassi	6	6^{d}

Quarterfinals
(Norway) C Ruud	1	5
4	(United States) M Chang	6	7
(Australia) M Woodforde	6^{5}	6	3
Q	(United States) C Mamiit	7^{7}	4	6

Semifinals
4	(United States) M Chang	6	3	4
Q	(United States) C Mamiit	3	6	6
