= 1994 San Jose Open – Singles =

Singles
- 1994 San Jose Open

Final
- Champion: (Italy) Renzo Furlan
- Runner-up: (United States) Michael Chang
- Score: 3–6, 6–3, 7–5

Details
- Draw: 32 (4Q / 3WC)
- Seeds: 8

Events
Singles	Doubles
← 1993 ·	Pacific Coast Championships	· 1995 →

Andre Agassi was the defending champion but did not compete that year.

Renzo Furlan won in the final 3–6, 6–3, 7–5 against Michael Chang.

== Seeds ==
A champion seed is indicated in bold text while text in italics indicates the round in which that seed was eliminated.

1. (United States) Michael Chang (final)
2. (United States) Richey Reneberg (quarterfinals)
3. (United States) Brad Gilbert (first round)
4. (United States) Jonathan Stark (second round)
5. (Germany) Karsten Braasch (semifinals)
6. (Italy) **Renzo Furlan (champion)**
7. (Australia) Jamie Morgan (first round)
8. (Brazil) Luiz Mattar (second round)

== Draw ==
=== Key ===
- Q = Qualifier
- WC = Wild card
- LL = Lucky loser
- Alt = Alternate
- SE = Special exempt
- PR = Protected ranking
- ITF = ITF entry
- JE = Junior exempt
- w/o = Walkover
- r = Retired
- d = Defaulted
- SR = Special ranking

First round
1	(United States) **M Chang**	**6**	**6**
(United States) T Ho	3	4
(United States) D Flach	1	2
(Denmark) **K Carlsen**	**6**	**6**
Q	(United States) K Evans	1	**6**	4
Q	(South Africa) **D Nainkin**	**6**	0	**6**
(France) **J-P Fleurian**	**6**	**6**
7	(Australia) J Morgan	3	3
3	(United States) B Gilbert	5	5
WC	(United States) **J Grabb**	**7**	**7**
(United States) **B Shelton**	**7^{7}**	**6**
(Belgium) X Daufresne	6^{5}	3
WC	(United States) J Connors	4	5
(United States) **A O'Brien**	**6**	**7**
(United States) S Bryan	6^{4}	4
5	(Germany) **K Braasch**	**7^{7}**	**6**
6	(Italy) **R Furlan**	**6**	**6**
Q	(United States) B Devening	1	2
(Brazil) **J Oncins**	**6**	**6**
(United States) R Weiss	2	2
(United States) **J Tarango**	**7**	**6**
(Australia) N Borwick	5	3
(Brazil) F Meligeni	6^{2}	4
4	(United States) **J Stark**	**7^{7}**	**6**
8	(Brazil) **L Mattar**	**6**	**6**
Q	(United States) B Coupe	3	3
(Zimbabwe) B Black	2	4
WC	(United States) **B MacPhie**	**6**	**6**
(Italy) C Caratti	1	6^{5}
(Venezuela) **M Ruah**	**6**	**7^{7}**
(United Kingdom) M Petchey	2	2
2	(United States) **R Reneberg**	**6**	**6**

Second round
1	(United States) **M Chang**	**6**	**6**
(Denmark) K Carlsen	3	2
Q	(South Africa) D Nainkin	1	4
(France) **J-P Fleurian**	**6**	**6**
WC	(United States) J Grabb	**6**	2	3
(United States) **B Shelton**	3	**6**	**6**
(United States) A O'Brien	4	2
5	(Germany) **K Braasch**	**6**	**6**
6	(Italy) **R Furlan**	**7^{7}**	**6**
(Brazil) J Oncins	6^{4}	3
(United States) **J Tarango**	5	**6**	**6**
4	(United States) J Stark	**7**	3	3
8	(Brazil) L Mattar	2	3
WC	(United States) **B MacPhie**	**6**	**6**
(Venezuela) M Ruah	2	1
2	(United States) **R Reneberg**	**6**	**6**

Quarterfinals
1	(United States) **M Chang**	6^{6}	**6**	**6**
(France) J-P Fleurian	**7^{8}**	1	3
(United States) B Shelton	4	4
5	(Germany) **K Braasch**	**6**	**6**
6	(Italy) **R Furlan**	1	**6**	**7**
(United States) J Tarango	**6**	1	5
WC	(United States) B MacPhie	**6**	4	2
2	(United States) **R Reneberg**	3	**6**	**6**

Semifinals
1	(United States) **M Chang**	**7**	4	**6**
5	(Germany) K Braasch	5	**6**	3
6	(Italy) **R Furlan**	**6**	**6**
2	(United States) R Reneberg	4	4

Final
1	(United States) Michael Chang	**6**	3	5
6	(Italy) **Renzo Furlan**	3	**6**	**7**
