= 1997 Sybase Open – Doubles =

Doubles
- 1997 Sybase Open

Final
- Champions: (United States) Brian MacPhie (South Africa) Gary Muller
- Runners-up: (The Bahamas) Mark Knowles (Canada) Daniel Nestor
- Score: 4–6, 7–6, 7–5

Details
- Draw: 16
- Seeds: 4

Events
Singles	Doubles
← 1996 ·	Pacific Coast Championships	· 1998 →

Trevor Kronemann and David Macpherson were the defending champions but lost in the semifinals to Mark Knowles and Daniel Nestor.

Brian MacPhie and Gary Muller won in the final 4–6, 7–6, 7–5 against Knowles and Nestor.

== Seeds ==
Champion seeds are indicated in bold text while text in italics indicates the round in which those seeds were eliminated.

1. (Canada) Grant Connell / (Canada) Sébastien Lareau (first round)
2. (The Bahamas) Mark Knowles / (Canada) Daniel Nestor (final)
3. (United States) Rick Leach / (United States) Jonathan Stark (semifinals)
4. (United States) Trevor Kronemann / (Australia) David Macpherson (semifinals)

== Draw ==
=== Key ===
- Q = Qualifier
- WC = Wild card
- LL = Lucky loser
- Alt = Alternate
- SE = Special exempt
- PR = Protected ranking
- ITF = ITF entry
- JE = Junior exempt
- w/o = Walkover
- r = Retired
- d = Defaulted
- SR = Special ranking

First round
1	(Canada) G Connell (Canada) S Lareau	4	5
(France) **J-P Fleurian** (France) **G Raoux**	**6**	**7**
(United States) **B MacPhie** (South Africa) **G Muller**	**6**	**6**
Q	(United States) K Jones (United States) D Randall	3	4
3	(United States) **R Leach** (United States) **J Stark**	**6**	**6**
(United States) K Kinnear (United States) C Woodruff	3	2
(United States) **T.J. Middleton** (United States) **J Waite**	**6**	3	**7**
(United States) S Davis (United States) R Reneberg	4	**6**	6
WC	(United States) L Jensen (United States) M Jensen	**6**	4	3
(United States) **T Ho** (Venezuela) **N Pereira**	1	**6**	**6**
(United States) G Van Emburgh (South Africa) C van Rensburg	4	2
4	(United States) **T Kronemann** (Australia) **D Macpherson**	**6**	**6**
WC	(Germany) **A Rădulescu** (United Kingdom) **G Rusedski**	**7**	**6**
(Sweden) D Ekerot (United States) J Tarango	5	3
WC	(United States) B Bryan (United States) M Bryan	1	2
2	(The Bahamas) **M Knowles** (Canada) **D Nestor**	**6**	**6**

Quarterfinals
(France) J-P Fleurian (France) G Raoux	2	4
(United States) **B MacPhie** (South Africa) **G Muller**	**6**	**6**
3	(United States) **R Leach** (United States) **J Stark**	**6**	**7**
(United States) T.J. Middleton (United States) J Waite	3	5
(United States) T Ho (Venezuela) N Pereira	**6**	6	4
4	(United States) **T Kronemann** (Australia) **D Macpherson**	4	**7**	**6**
WC	(Germany) A Rădulescu (United Kingdom) G Rusedski	3	6
2	(The Bahamas) **M Knowles** (Canada) **D Nestor**	**6**	**7**

Semifinals
(United States) **B MacPhie** (South Africa) **G Muller**	**6**	**6**
3	(United States) R Leach (United States) J Stark	4	4
4	(United States) T Kronemann (Australia) D Macpherson	3	5
2	(The Bahamas) **M Knowles** (Canada) **D Nestor**	**6**	**7**

Final
(United States) **Brian MacPhie** (South Africa) **Gary Muller**	4	**7**	**7**
2	(The Bahamas) Mark Knowles (Canada) Daniel Nestor	**6**	6	5
