= 1996 Sybase Open – Singles =

Singles
- 1996 Sybase Open

Final
- Champion: (United States) Pete Sampras
- Runner-up: (United States) Andre Agassi
- Score: 6–2, 6–3

Details
- Draw: 32 (4Q / 3WC)
- Seeds: 8

Events
Singles	Doubles
← 1995 ·	Pacific Coast Championships	· 1997 →

Andre Agassi was the defending champion but lost in the final 6–2, 6–3 against Pete Sampras.

== Seeds ==
A champion seed is indicated in bold text while text in italics indicates the round in which that seed was eliminated.

1. (United States) Andre Agassi (final)
2. (United States) **Pete Sampras (champion)**
3. (United States) Michael Chang (semifinals)
4. (United States) MaliVai Washington (first round)
5. (Australia) Mark Philippoussis (second round)
6. (New Zealand) Brett Steven (first round)
7. (United Kingdom) Greg Rusedski (quarterfinals)
8. (Argentina) Hernán Gumy (first round)

== Draw ==
=== Key ===
- Q = Qualifier
- WC = Wild card
- LL = Lucky loser
- Alt = Alternate
- SE = Special exempt
- PR = Protected ranking
- ITF = ITF entry
- JE = Junior exempt
- w/o = Walkover
- r = Retired
- d = Defaulted
- SR = Special ranking

First round
1	(United States) **A Agassi**	**6**	**6**
WC	(United States) R Wolters	2	2
(United States) **J Stark**	**6**	**6**
(Australia) S Draper	3	3
Q	(United States) **J Gimelstob**	**6**	**6**
(Venezuela) N Pereira	4	2
(United States) **R Reneberg**	4	**6**	**6**
8	(Argentina) H Gumy	**6**	1	0
3	(United States) **M Chang**	**6**	**6**
Q	(South Africa) G Stafford	3	2
(Sweden) M Tillström	3	1
(South Africa) **M Ondruska**	**6**	**6**
(Australia) **J Stoltenberg**	**6**	**6**
(United States) M Joyce	4	3
Q	(United States) S Bryan	3	3
5	(Australia) **M Philippoussis**	**6**	**6**
6	(New Zealand) B Steven	1	r
(United States) **V Spadea**	**3**
WC	(United States) L Jensen	4	4
(United States) **D Rostagno**	**6**	**6**
Q	(United States) D Wheaton	**6**	4	5
WC	(United States) **J Grabb**	1	**6**	**7**
(Slovakia) **J Krošlák**	**6**	**6**
4	(United States) M Washington	4	3
7	(United Kingdom) **G Rusedski**	**6**	**6**
(Australia) R Fromberg	1	3
LL	(United States) A O'Brien	**6**	3	2
(France) **L Roux**	3	**6**	**6**
(Portugal) **N Marques**	**6**	**7^{7}**
(Australia) M Tebbutt	4	6^{5}
(United States) T Ho	4	3
2	(United States) **P Sampras**	**6**	**6**

Second round
1	(United States) **A Agassi**	**6**	**6**
(United States) J Stark	4	4
Q	(United States) J Gimelstob	1	4
(United States) **R Reneberg**	**6**	**6**
3	(United States) **M Chang**	4	**6**	**6**
(South Africa) M Ondruska	**6**	1	4
(Australia) **J Stoltenberg**	**w/o**
5	(Australia) M Philippoussis
(United States) **V Spadea**	**6**	**7^{7}**
(United States) D Rostagno	4	6^{5}
WC	(United States) J Grabb	3	4
(Slovakia) **J Krošlák**	**6**	**6**
7	(United Kingdom) **G Rusedski**	6^{5}	**6**	**6**
(France) L Roux	**7^{7}**	2	2
(Portugal) N Marques	1	3
2	(United States) **P Sampras**	**6**	**6**

Quarterfinals
1	(United States) **A Agassi**	**7^{7}**	**6**
(United States) R Reneberg	6^{3}	4
3	(United States) **M Chang**	**6**	**6**
(Australia) J Stoltenberg	1	0
(United States) V Spadea	**7^{7}**	4	6^{2}
(Slovakia) **J Krošlák**	6^{4}	**6**	**7^{7}**
7	(United Kingdom) G Rusedski	**7^{7}**	3	4
2	(United States) **P Sampras**	6^{5}	**6**	**6**

Semifinals
1	(United States) **A Agassi**	**6**	5	**6**
3	(United States) M Chang	2	**7**	4
(Slovakia) J Krošlák	6^{6}	3
2	(United States) **P Sampras**	**7^{8}**	**6**

Final
1	(United States) Andre Agassi	2	3
2	(United States) **Pete Sampras**	**6**	**6**
