= 2002 Siebel Open – Singles =

Singles
- 2002 Siebel Open

Final
- Champion: (Australia) Lleyton Hewitt
- Runner-up: (United States) Andre Agassi
- Score: 4–6, 7–6^{(8–6)}, 7–6^{(7–4)}

Details
- Draw: 32 (4Q / 3WC)
- Seeds: 8

Events
Singles	Doubles
← 2001 ·	Pacific Coast Championships	· 2003 →

The 2002 Siebel Open was a men's international tennis tournament that took place from February 25 to March 3, 2002. Greg Rusedski was the defending champion but lost in the second round to Todd Martin.

Australian Lleyton Hewitt won in the final 4–6, 7–6^{(8–6)}, 7–6^{(7–4)} against American Andre Agassi.

== Seeds ==
A champion seed is indicated in bold text while text in italics indicates the round in which that seed was eliminated.

1. (Australia) **Lleyton Hewitt (champion)**
2. (United States) Andre Agassi (final)
3. (United States) Andy Roddick (semifinals)
4. (United States) Jan-Michael Gambill (semifinals)
5. (United Kingdom) Greg Rusedski (second round)
6. (Belgium) Xavier Malisse (second round)
7. n/a
8. (South Africa) Wayne Ferreira (quarterfinals)

== Draw ==
=== Key ===
- Q = Qualifier
- WC = Wild card
- LL = Lucky loser
- Alt = Alternate
- SE = Special exempt
- PR = Protected ranking
- ITF = ITF entry
- JE = Junior exempt
- w/o = Walkover
- r = Retired
- d = Defaulted
- SR = Special ranking

First round
1	(Australia) **L Hewitt**	**6**	3	**6**
(France) M Llodra	2	**6**	2
(Thailand) **P Srichaphan**	**6**	**6**
(Paraguay) R Delgado	3	1
(United States) **T Martin**	**6**	**6**
(Belgium) C Rochus	3	2
(Germany) L Burgsmüller	4	5
5	(United Kingdom) **G Rusedski**	**6**	**7**
4	(United States) **J-M Gambill**	**6**	**6**
(Czech Republic) J Vacek	2	3
(Denmark) **K Carlsen**	**7^{8}**	**7^{7}**
Q	(United States) T Dent	6^{6}	6^{2}
(United States) M Chang	3	4
(Australia) **W Arthurs**	**6**	**6**
(Brazil) **A Sá**	**6**	**6**
LL	(Israel) N Okun	4	0
6	(Belgium) **X Malisse**	**6**	**6**
(Russia) N Davydenko	4	2
WC	(United States) M Fish	**6**	3	5
(United States) **J Blake**	4	**6**	**7**
(Italy) **D Sanguinetti**	**6**	**6**
Q	(United States) J Gimelstob	3	4
WC	(United States) R Ginepri	4	4
4	(United States) **A Roddick**	**6**	**6**
8	(South Africa) **W Ferreira**	**6**	5	**6**
Q	(Spain) J Balcells	3	**7**	3
(South Korea) H-T Lee	2	2
(Denmark) **K Pless**	**6**	**6**
(Armenia) **S Sargsian**	4	**7**	**7^{9}**
WC	(United States) A Kim	**6**	5	6^{7}
Q	(United States) C Mamiit	**7^{7}**	3	2
2	(United States) **A Agassi**	6^{5}	**6**	**6**

Second round
1	(Australia) **L Hewitt**	6^{2}	**6**	**7^{8}**
(Thailand) P Srichaphan	**7^{7}**	4	6^{6}
(United States) **T Martin**	**6**	**7^{7}**
5	(United Kingdom) G Rusedski	4	6^{4}
4	(United States) **J-M Gambill**	**7^{10}**	**6**
(Denmark) K Carlsen	6^{8}	2
(Australia) **W Arthurs**	4	**6**	**6**
(Brazil) A Sá	**6**	1	4
6	(Belgium) X Malisse	3	1
(United States) **J Blake**	**6**	**6**
(Italy) D Sanguinetti	6^{3}	**7^{7}**	3
3	(United States) **A Roddick**	**7^{7}**	6^{4}	**6**
8	(South Africa) **W Ferreira**	4	**6**	**6**
(Denmark) K Pless	**6**	3	3
(Armenia) S Sargsian	2	4
2	(United States) **A Agassi**	**6**	**6**

Quarterfinals
1	(Australia) **L Hewitt**	**6**	**7**
(United States) T Martin	3	5
4	(United States) **J-M Gambill**	**7**	6^{5}	**7^{7}**
(Australia) W Arthurs	5	**7^{7}**	6^{4}
(United States) J Blake	4	2
3	(United States) **A Roddick**	**6**	**6**
8	(South Africa) W Ferreira	4	4
2	(United States) **A Agassi**	**6**	**6**

Semifinals
1	(Australia) **L Hewitt**	**7**	**6**
4	(United States) J-M Gambill	5	4
3	(United States) A Roddick	3	1
2	(United States) **A Agassi**	**6**	**6**

Final
1	(Australia) **Lleyton Hewitt**	4	**7^{8}**	**7^{7}**
2	(United States) Andre Agassi	**6**	6^{6}	6^{4}
