= 1998 Sybase Open – Singles =

Singles
- 1998 Sybase Open

Final
- Champion: (United States) Andre Agassi
- Runner-up: (United States) Pete Sampras
- Score: 6–2, 6–4

Details
- Draw: 32 (4Q / 3WC)
- Seeds: 8

Events
| Singles | Doubles |
| ← 1997 · | Pacific Coast Championships | · 1999 → |

Pete Sampras was the two-time defending champion, but lost in the final to Andre Agassi, 2–6, 4–6.

== Seeds ==
1. (United States) Pete Sampras (final)
2. (United States) Michael Chang (semifinals)
3. (Brazil) Gustavo Kuerten (second round)
4. (Australia) Mark Philippoussis (first round)
5. (Australia) Todd Woodbridge (first round)
6. (Australia) Richard Fromberg (first round)
7. (Germany) Tommy Haas (quarterfinals)
8. (Australia) Mark Woodforde (quarterfinals)

== Draw ==
=== Key ===
- Q = Qualifier
- WC = Wild card
- LL = Lucky loser
- Alt = Alternate
- SE = Special exempt
- PR = Protected ranking
- ITF = ITF entry
- JE = Junior exempt
- w/o = Walkover
- r = Retired
- d = Defaulted
- SR = Special ranking

=== Finals ===
Semifinals
1 | (United States) Pete Sampras | 6 | 2 | 6
Q | (Netherlands) John van Lottum | 3 | 6 | 2
WC | (United States) Andre Agassi | 6 | 7^{7}
2 | (United States) Michael Chang | 4 | 6^{4}

Final
1 | (United States) Pete Sampras | 2 | 4
WC | (United States) Andre Agassi | 6 | 6

=== Top half ===
First round
1 | (United States) P Sampras | 6 | 6
(United States) J Stark | 3 | 4
(Italy) A Gaudenzi | 3 | 1
(Spain) J Burillo | 6 | 6
WC | (United States) M Washington | 7 | 6
(Paraguay) R Delgado | 5 | 2
(Zimbabwe) W Black | 7^{8} | 2 | 4
8 | (Australia) M Woodforde | 6^{6} | 6 | 6
4/WC | (Australia) M Philippoussis | 4 | 3
(United States) V Spadea | 6 | 6
Q | (Netherlands) J van Lottum | 6 | 4 | 6
(United States) A O'Brien | 3 | 6 | 2
(Spain) E Benfele Álvarez | 6^{1} | 5
Q | (Brazil) J Oncins | 7^{7} | 7
(United States) T Martin | 6 | 7
5 | (Australia) T Woodbridge | 4 | 5

Second round
1 | (United States) P Sampras | 6 | 7^{7}
(Spain) J Burillo | 3 | 6^{2}
WC | (United States) M Washington | 5 | 5
8 | (Australia) M Woodforde | 7 | 7
(United States) V Spadea | 5 | 7^{7} | 2
Q | (Netherlands) J van Lottum | 7 | 6^{2} | 6
Q | (Brazil) J Oncins | 3 | 6^{3}
(United States) T Martin | 6 | 7^{7}

Quarterfinals
1 | (United States) P Sampras | 6 | 6
8 | (Australia) M Woodforde | 0 | 2
Q | (Netherlands) J van Lottum | 2 | 6 | 7^{10}
(United States) T Martin | 6 | 4 | 6^{8}

Semifinals
1 | (United States) P Sampras | 6 | 2 | 6
Q | (Netherlands) J van Lottum | 3 | 6 | 2

=== Bottom half ===
First round
6 | (Australia) R Fromberg | 7^{7} | 2 | 4
(Sweden) T Nydahl | 6^{5} | 6 | 6
(Armenia) S Sargsian | 3 | 6 | 4
Q | (United States) J-M Gambill | 6 | 1 | 6
WC | (United States) A Agassi | 6 | 6
(Spain) A Martín | 2 | 2
(United States) J Gimelstob | 6^{5} | 6 | 1
3 | (Brazil) G Kuerten | 7^{7} | 4 | 6
7 | (Germany) T Haas | 6 | 6
(Spain) JA Viloca-Puig | 1 | 4
(United States) R Reneberg | 4 | 2
(South Africa) G Stafford | 6 | 6
Q | (Switzerland) G Bastl | 6 | 2 | 6
(Brazil) F Meligeni | 1 | 6 | 3
(Germany) M Craca | 2 | 4
2 | (United States) M Chang | 6 | 6

Second round
(Sweden) T Nydahl | 4 | 6^{1}
Q | (United States) J-M Gambill | 6 | 7^{7}
WC | (United States) A Agassi | 6 | 6
3 | (Brazil) G Kuerten | 3 | 1
7 | (Germany) T Haas | 6 | 6
(South Africa) G Stafford | 2 | 3
Q | (Switzerland) G Bastl | 5 | 3
2 | (United States) M Chang | 7 | 6

Quarterfinals
Q | (United States) J-M Gambill | 5 | 6^{7}
WC | (United States) A Agassi | 7 | 7^{9}
7 | (Germany) T Haas | 3 | 7^{7} | 4
2 | (United States) M Chang | 6 | 6^{3} | 6

Semifinals
WC | (United States) A Agassi | 6 | 7^{7}
2 | (United States) M Chang | 4 | 6^{4}
