= 2002 Siebel Open =

- Date: February 25 – March 3
- Edition: 114th
- Category: International Series
- Draw: 32S / 16D
- Prize money: $375,000
- Surface: Hard court / indoor
- Location: San Jose, U.S.
- Venue: HP Pavilion

Champions

Singles
- (Australia) Lleyton Hewitt

Doubles
- (Zimbabwe) Wayne Black / (Zimbabwe) Kevin Ullyett
← 2001 ·	Pacific Coast Championships	· 2003 →

The 2002 Siebel Open was a men's tennis tournament played on indoor hard courts at the HP Pavilion at San Jose in San Jose, California in the United States that was part of the International Series of the 2002 ATP Tour. It was the 114th edition of the tournament and was held from February 25 through March 3, 2002. First-seeded Lleyton Hewitt won the singles title.

== Finals ==
=== Singles ===
(Australia) Lleyton Hewitt defeated (United States) Andre Agassi 4–6, 7–6^{(8–6)}, 7–6^{(7–4)}

- It was Hewitt's 1st title of the year and the 15th of his career.

=== Doubles ===
(Zimbabwe) Wayne Black / (Zimbabwe) Kevin Ullyett defeated (South Africa) John-Laffnie de Jager / (South Africa) Robbie Koenig 6–3, 4–6, [10–5]

- It was Black's 2nd title of the year and the 9th of his career. It was Ullyett's 2nd title of the year and the 15th of his career.
