= 2000 Sybase Open =

- Date: February 7–13
- Edition: 112th
- Category: ATP International Series
- Draw: 32S / 16D
- Prize money: $350,000
- Surface: Hard / Indoor
- Location: San Jose, U.S.
- Venue: San Jose Arena

Champions

Singles
- (Australia) Mark Philippoussis

Doubles
- (United States) Jan-Michael Gambill / (United States) Scott Humphries
← 1999 ·	Pacific Coast Championships	· 2001 →

The 2000 Sybase Open was a men's tennis tournament played on indoor hard courts at the San Jose Arena in San Jose, California in the United States and was part of the ATP International Series of the 2000 ATP Tour. It was the 112th edition of the tournament ran from February 7 through February 13, 2000. Second-seeded Mark Philippoussis won his second consecutive singles title at the event.

== Finals ==
=== Singles ===
(Australia) Mark Philippoussis defeated (Sweden) Mikael Tillström 7–5, 4–6, 6–3

- It was Philippoussis' first title of the year and the 8th of his career.

=== Doubles ===
(United States) Jan-Michael Gambill / (United States) Scott Humphries defeated (Argentina) Lucas Arnold Ker / (Philippines) Eric Taino 6–1, 6–4

- It was Gambill's first title of the year and of his career. It was Humphries' first title of the year and of his career.
