= 2001 Sybase Open =

- Date: February 26 – March 4
- Edition: 113th
- Category: International Series
- Draw: 32S / 16D
- Prize money: $375,000
- Surface: Hard court / indoor
- Location: San Jose, U.S.
- Venue: Compaq Center

Champions

Singles
- (United Kingdom) Greg Rusedski

Doubles
- (The Bahamas) Mark Knowles / (United States) Brian MacPhie
| ← 2000 · | Pacific Coast Championships | · 2002 → |

The 2001 Sybase Open was a men's tennis tournament played on indoor hard courts at the Compaq Center at San Jose in San Jose, California in the United States that was part of the International Series of the 2001 ATP Tour. It was the 113th edition of the tournament and was held from February 26 through March 4, 2001. Eighth-seeded Greg Rusedski won the singles title.

== Finals ==
=== Singles ===
(United Kingdom) Greg Rusedski defeated (United States) Andre Agassi 6–3, 6–4

- It was Rusedski's only title of the year and the 13th of his career.

=== Doubles ===
(The Bahamas) Mark Knowles / (United States) Brian MacPhie defeated (United States) Jan-Michael Gambill / (United States) Jonathan Stark 6–3, 7–6^{(7–4)}

- It was Knowles' 2nd title of the year and the 16th of his career. It was MacPhie's 1st title of the year and the 3rd of his career.
