= 1993 Volvo Tennis San Francisco =

- Date: February 1–7
- Edition: 105th
- Category: World Series
- Draw: 32S / 16D
- Prize money: $275,000
- Location: San Francisco, U.S.
- Venue: San Francisco Civic Auditorium

Champions

Singles
- (United States) Andre Agassi

Doubles
- (United States) Scott Davis / (Netherlands) Jacco Eltingh
- Pacific Coast Championships

The 1993 Volvo Tennis San Francisco was a men's tennis tournament held at the San Francisco Civic Auditorium in San Francisco, California in the United States and was part of the World Series of the 1993 ATP Tour. The tournament was held from February 1 through February 7. After 21 years it was the final time the tournament was held in San Francisco before switching location to San Jose. First-seeded Andre Agassi won the singles title and earned $39,600 first-prize money.

== Finals ==
=== Singles ===
(United States) Andre Agassi defeated (United States) Brad Gilbert 6–2, 6–7^{(4–7)}, 6–2

- It was Agassi's 1st singles title of the year and the 18th of his career.

=== Doubles ===
(United States) Scott Davis / (Netherlands) Jacco Eltingh defeated (United States) Patrick McEnroe / (United States) Jonathan Stark 6–1, 4–6, 7–5
