= 1999 Sybase Open =

- Date: February 8–14
- Edition: 111th
- Category: ATP World Series
- Draw: 32S / 16D
- Prize money: $325,000
- Surface: Hard / indoor
- Location: San Jose, USA
- Venue: San Jose Arena

Champions

Singles
- (Australia) Mark Philippoussis

Doubles
- (Australia) Mark Woodforde / (Australia) Todd Woodbridge
← 1998 ·	Pacific Coast Championships	· 2000 →

The 1999 Sybase Open was a men's tennis tournament played on indoor hard courts at the San Jose Arena in San Jose, California in the United States and was part of the ATP World Series of the 1999 ATP Tour. It was the 111th edition of the tournament ran from February 8 through February 14, 1999. Third-seeded Mark Philippoussis won the singles title.

== Finals ==
=== Singles ===
(Australia) Mark Philippoussis defeated (United States) Cecil Mamiit, 6–3, 6–2.

- It was Philippoussis' first title of the year and the 6th of his career.

=== Doubles ===
(Australia) Mark Woodforde / (Australia) Todd Woodbridge defeated (North Macedonia) Aleksandar Kitinov / (Socialist Federal Republic of Yugoslavia) Nenad Zimonjić, 7–5, 6–7^{(3–7)}, 6–4.

- It was Woodforde's second title of the year and the 58th of his career. It was Woodbridge's second title of the year and the 57th of his career.
