= 1995 Sybase Open =

- Date: February 6–13
- Edition: 107th
- Category: ATP World Series
- Draw: 32S/16D
- Prize money: $303,000
- Surface: Hard / indoor
- Location: San Jose, U.S.
- Venue: San Jose Arena

Champions

Singles
- (United States) Andre Agassi

Doubles
- (United States) Jim Grabb / (United States) Patrick McEnroe
← 1994 ·	Pacific Coast Championships	· 1996 →

The 1995 Sybase Open is a men's tennis tournament held in San Jose, California, United States and played on indoor hard courts. The event was part of the ATP World Series of the 1995 ATP Tour. It was the 107th edition of the tournament and was held from February 6 through February 13, 1995.

First-seeded Andre Agassi won the singles title, his third win in San Jose after 1990 and 1993.

== Finals ==
=== Singles ===
(United States) Andre Agassi defeated (United States) Michael Chang, 6–2, 1–6, 6–3

- It was Agassi's 2nd singles title of the year and the 26th of his career.

=== Doubles ===
(United States) Jim Grabb / (United States) Patrick McEnroe defeated (United States) Alex O'Brien / (Australia) Sandon Stolle, 3–6, 7–5, 6–0
