= 1997 Sybase Open =

- Date: February 10–16
- Edition: 109th
- Category: ATP World Series
- Draw: 32S / 16D
- Prize money: $303,000
- Surface: Hard / indoor
- Location: San Jose, U.S.
- Venue: San Jose Arena

Champions

Singles
- (United States) Pete Sampras

Doubles
- (United States) Brian MacPhie / (South Africa) Gary Muller
← 1996 ·	Pacific Coast Championships	· 1998 →

The 1997 Sybase Open was a men's tennis tournament played on indoor hard courts at the San Jose Arena in San Jose, California in the United States and was part of the ATP World Series of the 1997 ATP Tour. It was the 109th edition of the tournament ran from February 10 through February 16, 1997. First-seeded Pete Sampras won his second consecutive singles title at the event.

== Finals ==
=== Singles ===
(United States) Pete Sampras defeated (United Kingdom) Greg Rusedski 3–6, 5–0 (Rusedski retired)

- It was Sampras' 2nd title of the year and the 48th of his career.

=== Doubles ===
(United States) Brian MacPhie / (South Africa) Gary Muller defeated (The Bahamas) Mark Knowles / (Canada) Daniel Nestor 4–6, 7–6, 7–5

- It was MacPhie's only title of the year and the 1st of his career. It was Muller's only title of the year and the 8th of his career.
