= Melville H. Long =

American tennis player

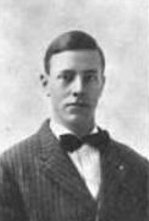
- Long in his college yearbook (c. 1909)
- Born: October 18, 1889; San Francisco, California, U.S.
- Died: May 1969 (aged 79)
- Education: UC Berkeley
- Occupation(s): Physician, surgeon

Melville Hammond Long (October 18, 1889 – May 1969) of San Francisco, California, was an American tennis player.

== Biography ==
He was born on October 18, 1889, in San Francisco, California. He attended University of California, Berkeley and received a medical degree, and by 1918 was a physician and surgeon.

He won the men's singles competition at the Pacific Coast Championships (now known as the SAP Open) three times, in 1906, 1908 and 1910.

Long died in 1969.
