= 1996 Sybase Open =

Tennis tournament

- Date: February 12–18
- Edition: 108th
- Category: World Series
- Draw: 32S / 16D
- Prize money: $303,000
- Location: San Jose, U.S.
- Venue: San Jose Arena

Champions

Singles
- (United States) Pete Sampras

Doubles
- (United States) Trevor Kronemann / (Australia) David Macpherson
← 1995 ·	Pacific Coast Championships	· 1997 →

The 1996 Sybase Open was a men's tennis tournament played on indoor hard courts at the San Jose Arena in San Jose, California in the United States. It was part of the World Series of the 1996 ATP Tour. The tournament ran from February 12 through February 18, 1996. Second-seeded Pete Sampras won the singles title.

== Finals ==
=== Singles ===
(United States) Pete Sampras defeated (United States) Andre Agassi 6–2, 6–3

- It was Sampras' 1st title of the year and the 39th of his career.

=== Doubles ===
(United States) Trevor Kronemann / (Australia) David Macpherson defeated (United States) Richey Reneberg / (United States) Jonathan Stark 6–4, 3–6, 6–3

- It was Kronemann's 1st title of the year and the 6th of his career. It was Macpherson's 1st title of the year and the 12th of his career.

== See also ==
- Agassi–Sampras rivalry
