= 1998 Sybase Open =

- Date: February 9–15
- Edition: 110th
- Category: ATP World Series
- Draw: 32S / 16D
- Prize money: $315,000
- Surface: Hard / Indoor
- Location: San Jose, U.S.
- Venue: San Jose Arena

Champions

Singles
- (United States) Andre Agassi

Doubles
- (Australia) Mark Woodforde / (Australia) Todd Woodbridge
← 1997 ·	Pacific Coast Championships	· 1999 →

The 1998 Sybase Open was a men's tennis tournament played on indoor hard courts at the San Jose Arena in San Jose, California in the United States and was part of the ATP World Series of the 1998 ATP Tour. It was the 110th edition of the tournament ran from February 9 through February 15, 1998. Unseeded wildcard-entry Andre Agassi won the singles title.

== Finals ==
=== Singles ===
(United States) Andre Agassi defeated (United States) Pete Sampras 6–2, 6–4

- It was Agassi's first title of the year and the 35th of his career.

=== Doubles ===
(Australia) Mark Woodforde / (Australia) Todd Woodbridge defeated (Brazil) Nelson Aerts / (Brazil) André Sá 6–1, 7–5

- It was Woodforde's second title of the year and the 54th of his career. It was Woodbridge's second title of the year and the 53rd of his career.

== See also ==
- Agassi–Sampras rivalry
