= Barbara Krase =

American tennis player

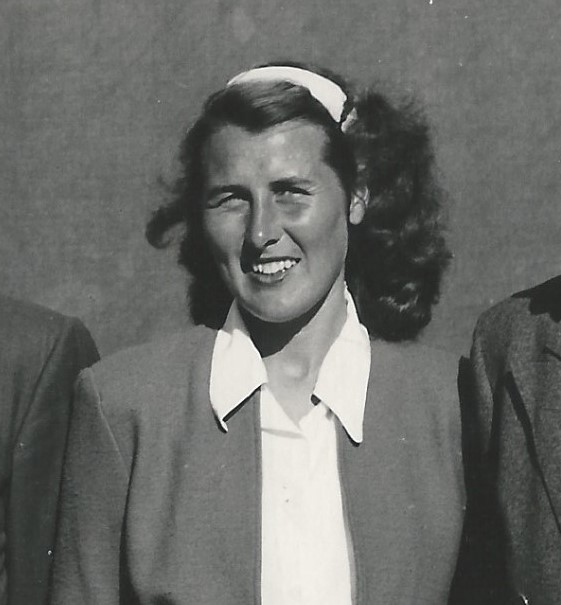
- Full name: Barbara Krase Chandler
- Country (sports): United States
- Born: October 27, 1923; San Francisco, California
- Died: November 20, 2019 (aged 96); Boise, Idaho

Singles
- Highest ranking: No. 8 (1947, John Olliff)

Grand Slam singles results
- US Open: QF (1941, 1947)

Grand Slam mixed doubles results
- US Open: QF (1947)

Barbara Krase Chandler (October 27, 1923 – November 20, 2019) was an American tennis player.

Born and raised in San Francisco, Krase was active on tour in the 1940s, before moving with her husband Bill Chandler to Boise, Idaho in the 1950s, where she continued to compete locally.

Krase twice reached the singles quarter-finals of the U.S. national championships, as an unseeded player in 1941 and as the eighth seed in 1947. Her biggest career title came at the U.S. Women's Clay Court Championships in 1946, with her run including a semi-final win over Shirley Fry. She beat Virginia Kovacs in the final.
