= George F. Whitney =

American tennis player

- Country (sports): United States
- Born: July 2, 1873 San Francisco, United States
- Died: August 13, 1935 (aged 62) Monterey, California, United States

George F. Whitney (July 2, 1873 – August 13, 1935) was an American male tennis player.

He won the singles title at the Pacific Coast Championships four times. His first two titles, in 1897 and 1899, where when the tournament was played in San Rafael, California, while his title wins in 1900 and 1901 took place when the event was hosted in Berkeley, California. In 1897 he defeated his brother Robert in the All-Comers final to reach the Challenge Round against Samuel Hardy. Together they won the doubles title in 1896 and 1900.

Whitney retired from active tennis in 1902 on doctor's orders due to angina pectoris.
