= Gerald Stratford =

Horticultural model

Gerald Stratford is a retired butcher and Thames bargee who is now famous for growing giant vegetables, his avuncular manner and his rustic style.

He lives in Milton-under-Wychwood in the Cotswolds where he grows vegetables in two allotments. He comes from Worton where he was the youngest of six children in a farmer's family. He started gardening at the age of five but did not do well at school, being dyslexic. He worked as a butcher but then found work on the River Thames, as he prefers outdoor activity.

Besides gardening, his other hobby is fishing. To pursue his horticultural hobby, he joined Twitter where his matter-of-fact manner gained a following during the pandemic. His partner, Elizabeth, helps him with such technologies.

His style has been adopted by Gucci which featured him in their "Off the grid" collection.
