= Pacific Coast Championships =

Defunct tennis tournament
- Founded: 1889
- Abolished: 2013
- Editions: 125
- Location: San Jose, California; United States
- Venue: SAP Center at San Jose
- Category: Grand Prix (1970–1989); ATP World Series (1990–1999); ATP International Series (2000–2008); ATP World Tour 250 series (2009–2013)
- Surface: Clay / outdoors Hard / outdoors/indoors
- Draw: 32S / 32Q / 16D
- Prize money: $623,730 (2013)

The Pacific Coast Championships were an annual men's tennis tournament founded as the Pacific States Championships or the Pacific Coast Sectional Championships also known as the Pacific Coast International Championships. It was the second-oldest ongoing tennis tournament in the United States and ran from 1889 until 2013. Its final edition, known by its sponsored name SAP Open, was an ATP World Tour 250 series event on the Association of Tennis Professionals tour and played indoors on a hard court surface at the SAP Center at San Jose.

== History ==
The tournament began in 1889 as the Pacific Coast Championships at the Old Del Monte Lodge in Monterey, California and was won by William H. Taylor. It is the second-oldest tennis tournament in the United States, predated only by the U.S. Championships (current US Open). The tournament predates the Australian Open and the French Open. The following year, 1890, the tournament moved to the Hotel Rafael in San Rafael where it was held until 1900 when it relocated to the Berkeley Tennis Club in Berkeley. Barry MacKay bought the tournament in 1970 at Berkeley. In 1972 and 1973 the event was hosted by the Round Hill Country Club in Alamo and was played on clay courts. The tournament's location moved indoor to the Cow Palace in 1974 and changed venues to what is now the Bill Graham Civic Auditorium. before coming to San Jose in 1994, shortly after the HP Pavilion was built.

Before tennis' open era, the tournament had both men's and women's events. During World War II, it had special servicemen competitions.

Earlier title sponsors include Redwood Bank, Fireman's Fund, Transamerica, Volvo, and Comerica. More recently, it was the Sybase Open from 1994 through 2001 and the Siebel Open from 2002 through 2004. The tournament was known as the SAP Open from 2005 until the last edition in 2013.

Silicon Valley Sports and Entertainment who bought half of it from Barry MacKay when the tournament moved to San Jose and the other half in 1995. SVS&E also owns the San Jose Sharks. MacKay owned and ran the tournament from 1970 until 1995.

After McKay sold the venue, the SAP Open was downgraded to an ATP 250-level event with fewer highly ranked players entering. The highest ranked player for the 2013 SAP Open was Milos Raonic, ranked 13th. The 2013 event was the last held in the Bay Area. Its ATP World Tour 250 series sanction was taken over by the Memphis Open, while a new tournament in Rio de Janeiro took over the latter's ATP 500 sanction.

== Multiple winners ==
=== Singles tournament ===
Men who have won the singles tournament more than once are: William H. Taylor, Samuel Hardy, Sumner Hardy, George F. Whitney, Melville H. Long, Maurice McLoughlin, George C. Janes, William Johnston, Fred Perry, Don Budge, Robert Riggs, Ted Schroeder, Barry MacKay, Stan Smith, Arthur Ashe, John McEnroe, Michael Chang, Andre Agassi, Pete Sampras, Mark Philippoussis, Andy Roddick, Andy Murray, and Milos Raonic.

Women who have won the single's tournament more than once are: Helen Wills Moody, Helen Jacobs, Edith Cross, Alice Marble, Margaret Osborne duPont, Dorothy Head Knode, Darlene Hard, and Margaret Court.

William Johnston has the most singles tournament wins with ten victories.

=== Overall winners ===
The players who have won the most combined singles, doubles and mixed doubles titles in this tournament are:

- John McEnroe – 14
- William Johnston – 10 (all in singles)
- Don Budge – 9
- Helen Wills Moody – 9
- Peter Fleming – 7 (all in doubles)

== Past finals ==
=== Men's singles ===
Location	Year	Champions	Runners-up	Score
Monterey	1889	(United States) William H. Taylor	(British Empire) Valentine J. Gadesden	6–3, 6–1, 6–2
San Rafael	1890	(United States) William H. Taylor	(United States) Charles R. Yates	6–4, 9–7, 6–0
San Rafael	1891	(United States) William H. Taylor	(United States) Charles P. Hubbard	6–2, 6–1, 5–7, 6–3
San Rafael	1892	(United States) William H. Taylor	(United States) Charles P. Hubbard	6–3, 6–3, 4–6, 5–7, 6–3
San Rafael	1893	(United States) Thomas A. Driscoll	(United States) Arthur Allen	6–3, 6–4, 6–3
San Rafael	1894	(United States) Samuel Hardy	(United States) Thomas A. Driscoll	6–0, 6–3, 6–1
San Rafael	1895	(United States) Sumner Hardy	(United States) Samuel Hardy	6–3, 4–6, 8–6, 6–2
San Rafael	1896	(United States) Samuel Hardy	(United States) George F. Whitney	6–2, 6–3, 6–2
San Rafael	1897	(United States) George F. Whitney	(United States) Samuel Hardy	4–6, 1–6, 6–4, 6–4, 8–6
San Rafael	1898	(United States) Sumner Hardy	(United States) John Holmes	6–3, 2–6, 7–5, 6–1
San Rafael	1899	(United States) George F. Whitney	(United States) Sumner Hardy	4–6, 6–4, 6–1, 6–4
Berkeley
Berkeley	1900	(United States) George F. Whitney	(United States) Sumner Hardy	6–2, 6–4, 6–4
Berkeley	1901	(United States) George F. Whitney	(United States) Alphonzo Edward Bell	4–6, 6–1, 6–2, 7–5
Berkeley	1902	(United States) Louis R. Freeman	(United States) William Collier	6–4, 6–4, 6–3
Berkeley	1903	(United States) Alphonzo Edward Bell	(United States) Louis R. Freeman	6–3, 7–5, 11–9
Berkeley	1904	(United States) John D. MacGavin	(United States) Alphonzo Edward Bell	6–2, 6–3, 3–6, 15–13
Berkeley	1905	(United States) George C. Janes	(United States) Frederick Adams	6–0, 4–6, 5–7, 6–4, 6–3
Berkeley	1906	(United States) Melville H. Long	(United States) George C. Janes	6–2, 7–5, 6–2
Berkeley	1907	(United States) Maurice McLoughlin	(United States) Melville H. Long	13–11, 6–4, 5–7, 4–6, 6–4
Berkeley	1908	(United States) Melville H. Long	(United States) Maurice McLoughlin	8–10, 6–8, 6–4, 11–9, 6–0
Berkeley	1909	(United States) George C. Janes	(United States) Charles S. Rogers	5–7, 6–3, 6–3, 6–4
Berkeley	1910	(United States) Melville H. Long	(United States) George C. Janes	6–0, 6–3, 6–1
Berkeley	1911	(United States) Maurice McLoughlin	(United States) Melville H. Long	6–4, 6–3, 6–2
Berkeley	1912	(United States) Maurice McLoughlin	(United States) Melville H. Long	default
Berkeley	1913	(United States) Bill Johnston	(United States) John R. Strachan	6–1, 6–2, 3–6, 4–6, 6–4
Berkeley	1914	(United States) Bill Johnston	(United States) Elia Fottrell	6–4, 6–0, 6–2
Berkeley	1915	(United States) Herbert L. Hahn	(United States) H. Van Dyke Johns	6–1, 6–4, 3–6, 6–1
Berkeley	1916	(United States) Bill Johnston	(United States) Clarence Griffin	9–7, 7–5, 6–8, 8–6
Berkeley	1917	(United States) Bill Johnston	(United States) John R. Strachan	6–3, 0–6, 6–1, 4–6, 6–2
Berkeley	1918	(United States) Roland Roberts	(United States) Victor Breeden	6–3, 6–4, 10–8
Berkeley	1919	(United States) Bill Johnston	(United States) Roland Roberts	6–2, 6–4, 6–2
Berkeley	1920	(United States) Willis E. Davis	(United States) Clarence Griffin	10–8, 6–4, 2–6, 6–3
Berkeley	1921	(United States) Bill Johnston	(United States) Roland Roberts	6–4, 6–3, 6–3
Berkeley	1922	(United States) Bill Johnston	(United States) Bill Tilden	7–5, 7–9, 6–1, 6–0
Berkeley	1923	(United States) Howard Kinsey	(United States) Clarence Griffin	6–3, 7–5, 7–5
Berkeley	1924	(United States) Howard Kinsey	(United States) Clarence Griffin	2–6, 5–7, 6–2, 7–5, 6–4
Berkeley	1925	(United States) Bill Johnston	(United States) Clarence Griffin	6–2, 6–1, 6–4
Berkeley	1926	(United States) Bill Johnston	(United States) Clarence Griffin	6–2, 6–1, 6–3
Berkeley	1927	(United States) Bill Johnston	(United States) Gerald Stratford	5–7, 6–3, 6–2, 4–6, 6–1
Berkeley	1928	(United States) Cranston Holman	(United States) Robert Seller	6–3, 7–5, 3–6, 6–1
Berkeley	1929	(United States) Robert Seller	(United States) Gerald Stratford	6–4, 6–2, 3–6, 1–6, 6–4
Berkeley	1930	(United States) George Lott	(United States) Keith Gledhill	6–3, 6–2, 6–1
San Francisco	1931	(United States) Ellsworth Vines	(United Kingdom) Fred Perry	6–3, 21–19, 6–0
San Francisco	1932	(United Kingdom) Fred Perry	(United Kingdom) Henry Austin	3–6, 6–4, 8–6, 6–1
San Francisco	1933	(United States) Lester Stoefen	(United States) Keith Gledhill	3–6, 4–6, 6–4, 9–7, 6–3
Berkeley	1934	(United Kingdom) Fred Perry	(United States) Don Budge	3–6, 6–4, 7–5, 1–6, 7–5
Berkeley	1935	(United States) Don Budge	(United States) Bobby Riggs	6–2, 6–0, 7–9, 6–4
Berkeley	1936	(United States) Don Budge	(United States) Walter Senior	6–1, 6–0, 6–3
Berkeley	1937	(United States) Don Budge	(United States) Bobby Riggs	4–6, 6–3, 6–2, 6–4
Berkeley	1938	(Australia) Harry Hopman	(United States) Jack Tidball	5–7, 6–2, 7–5, 8–6
Berkeley	1939	(United States) Bobby Riggs	(United States) Frank Kovacs	6–3, 2–6, 6–4, 2–6, 7–5
Berkeley	1940	(United States) Bobby Riggs	(United States) Frank Kovacs	6–4, 2–6, 6–2, 6–2
Berkeley	1941	(United States) Frank Kovacs	(United States) Bobby Riggs	6–2, 6–2, 6–1
San Francisco	1942	(United States) Tom Brown	(United States) William Canning, Jr.	4–6, 5–7, 6–1, 6–2, 6–1
San Francisco	1943	(United States) Jack Jossi	(United States) Norman K. Brooks	6–3, 7–5, 6–0
San Francisco	1944	(United States) Edwin Amark	(United States) P. Morley Lewis	6–4, 6–4, 6–2
San Francisco	1945	(United States) Tom Brown	(United States) Harry Likas	6–2, 2–6, 6–3
San Francisco	1946	(United States) Jack Kramer	(United States) Eddie Moylan	7–5, 4–6, 7–5, 6–3
San Francisco	1947	(United States) Jack Kramer	(United States) Tom Brown	6–2, 8–6
San Francisco	1948	(United States) Ted Schroeder	(United States) Pancho Gonzalez	6–4, 4–6, 6–3, 6–1
Berkeley	1949	(United States) Ted Schroeder	(South Africa) Eric Sturgess	6–1, 6–3, 6–1
Berkeley	1950	(United States) Arthur Larsen	(United States) Herbert Flam	4–6, 6–3, 6–3, 6–2
Berkeley	1951	(United States) Ted Schroeder	(United States) Vic Seixas	6–4, 6–4, 6–2
Berkeley	1952	(United States) Richard Savitt	(United States) Arthur Larsen	10–8, 6–3, 6–4
Berkeley	1953	(United States) Tony Trabert	(United States) Vic Seixas	7–5, 6–3, 6–2
Berkeley	1954	(United States) Tony Trabert	(United States) Vic Seixas	6–3, 6–4, 6–3
Berkeley	1955	(United States) Tony Trabert	(United States) Vic Seixas	4–6, 6–3, 6–4, 7–5
Berkeley	1956	(Australia) Ashley Cooper	(Chile) Luis Ayala	4–6, 6–3, 6–4, 6–4
Berkeley	1957	(Sweden) Sven Davidson	(United States) Vic Seixas	7–5, 0–6, 6–1, 6–4
Berkeley	1958	(United States) Budge Patty	(United Kingdom) Mike Davies	6–4, 7–5, 13–15, 6–2
Berkeley	1959	(United States) Barry MacKay	(India) Ramanathan Krishnan	7–5, 6–4, 1–6, 6–2
Berkeley	1960	(United States) Barry MacKay	(United States) Jack Douglas	6–3, 6–2, 6–4
Berkeley	1961	(Mexico) Antonio Palafox	(United States) Jim McManus	7–5, 6–3
Berkeley	1962	(Sweden) Jan-Erik Lundqvist	(United States) Dennis Ralston	3–6, 6–1, 6–3, 6–4
Berkeley	1963	(Mexico) Rafael Osuna	(United States) Whitney Reed	3–6, 6–4, 6–1, 6–1
Berkeley	1964	(Spain) Manuel Santana	(France) Pierre Darmon	4–6, 7–5, 8–6, 7–5
Berkeley	1965	(United States) Marty Riessen	(United States) Dennis Ralston	5–7, 3–6, 6–1, 6–4, 8–6
Berkeley	1966	(Australia) Fred Stolle	(Puerto Rico) Charles Pasarell	6–4, 2–6, 6–4
Berkeley	1967	(United States) Charles Pasarell	(United States) Cliff Richey	7–5, 8–6
Berkeley	↓ Open Era ↓			
Berkeley	1968	(United States) Stan Smith	(United States) Jim McManus	10–8, 6–1, 6–1
Berkeley	1969	(United States) Stan Smith	(United States) Cliff Richey	6–2, 6–3
Berkeley	1970	(United States) Arthur Ashe	(United States) Cliff Richey	6–4, 6–2, 6–4
Berkeley	1971	(Australia) Rod Laver	(Australia) Ken Rosewall	6–4, 6–4, 7–6
Albany	1972	(United States) Jimmy Connors	(United States) Roscoe Tanner	6–2, 7–6
Alamo	1973	(Australia) Roy Emerson	(Sweden) Björn Borg	5–7, 6–1, 6–4
San Francisco
San Francisco	1974	(Australia) Ross Case	(United States) Arthur Ashe	6–3, 5–7, 6–4
San Francisco	1975	(United States) Arthur Ashe	(Argentina) Guillermo Vilas	6–0, 7–6^{(7–4)}
San Francisco	1976	(United States) Roscoe Tanner	(United States) Brian Gottfried	4–6, 7–5, 6–1
San Francisco	1977	(United States) Butch Walts	(United States) Brian Gottfried	4–6, 6–3, 7–5
San Francisco	1978	(United States) John McEnroe	(United States) Dick Stockton	2–6, 7–6^{(7–5)}, 6–2
San Francisco	1979	(United States) John McEnroe	(United States) Peter Fleming	4–6, 7–5, 6–2
San Francisco	1980	(United States) Gene Mayer	(United States) Eliot Teltscher	6–2, 2–6, 6–1
San Francisco	1981	(United States) Eliot Teltscher	(United States) Brian Teacher	6–3, 7–6^{(7–4)}
San Francisco	1982	(United States) John McEnroe	(United States) Jimmy Connors	6–1, 6–3
San Francisco	1983	(Czechoslovakia) Ivan Lendl	(United States) John McEnroe	3–6, 7–6^{(7–4)}, 6–4
San Francisco	1984	(United States) John McEnroe	(United States) Brad Gilbert	6–4, 6–4
San Francisco	1985	(Sweden) Stefan Edberg	(United States) Johan Kriek	6–4, 6–2
San Francisco	1986	(United States) John McEnroe	(United States) Jimmy Connors	7–6, 6–3
San Francisco	1987	(Sweden) Peter Lundgren	(United States) Jim Pugh	6–1, 7–5
San Francisco	1988	(United States) Michael Chang	(United States) Johan Kriek	6–2, 6–3
San Francisco	1989	(United States) Brad Gilbert	(Sweden) Anders Järryd	7–5, 6–2
San Francisco	1990	(United States) Andre Agassi	(United States) Todd Witsken	6–1, 6–3
San Francisco	1991	(Australia) Darren Cahill	(United States) Brad Gilbert	6–2, 3–6, 6–4
San Francisco	1992	(United States) Michael Chang	(United States) Jim Courier	6–3, 6–3
San Francisco	1993	(United States) Andre Agassi	(United States) Brad Gilbert	6–2, 6–7^{(4–7)}, 6–2
San Jose	1994	(Italy) Renzo Furlan	(United States) Michael Chang	3–6, 6–3, 7–5
San Jose	1995	(United States) Andre Agassi	(United States) Michael Chang	6–2, 1–6, 6–3
San Jose	1996	(United States) Pete Sampras	(United States) Andre Agassi	6–2, 6–3
San Jose	1997	(United States) Pete Sampras	(United Kingdom) Greg Rusedski	3–6, 5–0 ret
San Jose	1998	(United States) Andre Agassi	(United States) Pete Sampras	6–2, 6–4
San Jose	1999	(Australia) Mark Philippoussis	(United States) Cecil Mamiit	6–3, 6–2
San Jose	2000	(Australia) Mark Philippoussis	(Sweden) Mikael Tillström	7–5, 4–6, 6–3
San Jose	2001	(United Kingdom) Greg Rusedski	(United States) Andre Agassi	6–3, 6–4
San Jose	2002	(Australia) Lleyton Hewitt	(United States) Andre Agassi	4–6, 7–6^{(8–6)}, 7–6^{(7–4)}
San Jose	2003	(United States) Andre Agassi	(Italy) Davide Sanguinetti	6–3, 6–1
San Jose	2004	(United States) Andy Roddick	(United States) Mardy Fish	7–6^{(15–13)}, 6–4
San Jose	2005	(United States) Andy Roddick	(France) Cyril Saulnier	6–0, 6–4
San Jose	2006	(United Kingdom) Andy Murray	(Australia) Lleyton Hewitt	2–6, 6–1, 7–6^{(7–3)}
San Jose	2007	(United Kingdom) Andy Murray	(Croatia) Ivo Karlović	6–7^{(3–7)}, 6–4, 7–6^{(7–2)}
San Jose	2008	(United States) Andy Roddick	(Czech Republic) Radek Štěpánek	6–4, 7–5
San Jose	2009	(Czech Republic) Radek Štěpánek	(United States) Mardy Fish	3–6, 6–4, 6–2
San Jose	2010	(Spain) Fernando Verdasco	(United States) Andy Roddick	3–6, 6–4, 6–4
San Jose	2011	(Canada) Milos Raonic	(Spain) Fernando Verdasco	7–6^{(8–6)}, 7–6^{(7–5)}
San Jose	2012	(Canada) Milos Raonic	(Uzbekistan) Denis Istomin	7–6^{(7–3)}, 6–2
San Jose	2013	(Canada) Milos Raonic	(Germany) Tommy Haas	6–4, 6–3
succeeded by Memphis Open

=== Women's singles ===
Location	Year	Champions	Runners-up	Score
Berkeley	1922	(United States) Helen Wills	(United States) Anna Leachman	6–1, 6–0
Berkeley	1923	(United States) Helen Wills	(United States) Charlotte Hosmer	6–2, 6–0
Berkeley	1924	(United States) Charlotte Hosmer	(United States) Avery Follett	8–6, 2–6, 6–3
Berkeley	1925	(United States) Helen Wills	(United States) Charlotte Hosmer	6–4, 6–0
Berkeley	1926	(United States) Helen Jacobs	(United States) Helen Baker	3–6, 6–4, 6–0
Berkeley	1927	(United States) Helen Jacobs	(United States) May Sutton Bundy	6–3, 6–2
Berkeley	1928	(United States) Edith Cross	(United States) Anna McCune Harper	8–6, 6–2
Berkeley	1929	(United States) Ethel Burkhardt	(United States) Anna McCune Harper	6–4, 6–0
Berkeley	1930	(United States) Helen Wills Moody	(United States) Anna McCune Harper	6–3, 6–1
Berkeley	1931	(United States) Edith Cross	(United States) Dorothy Weisel	6–4, 2–6, 7–5
San Francisco	1932	(United States) Alice Marble	(United States) Anna McCune Harper	6–2, 6–2
San Francisco	1933	(United States) Alice Marble	(United Kingdom) Dorothy Round	6–4, 6–1
Berkeley	1934	(United Kingdom) Kay Stammers	(United Kingdom) Freda James	3–6, 6–4, 6–3
Berkeley	1935	(United States) Ethel Arnold	(United States) Carolin Babcock	6–3, 6–3
Berkeley	1936	(United States) Margaret Osborne	(United States) Virginia Wolfenden	0–6, 6–1, 6–3
Berkeley	1937	(Chile) Anita Lizana	(United Kingdom) Margot Lumb	6–2, 6–2
Berkeley	1938	(France) Simonne Mathieu	(Australia) Nancye Wynne Bolton	6–1, 6–0
Berkeley	1939	(United States) Sarah Palfrey Cooke	(United States) Virginia Wolfenden	6–4, 6–1
Berkeley	1940	(United States) Virginia Wolfenden	(United States) Helen Jacobs	6–4, 6–2
Berkeley	1941	(United States) Margaret Osborne	(United States) Patricia Canning Todd	10–8, 2–6, 6–3
San Francisco	1942	(United States) Margaret Osborne	(United States) Barbara Krase	6–1, 6–0
San Francisco	1943	(United States) Louise Brough	(United States) Margaret Osborne	6–4, 2–6, 6–2
San Francisco	1944	(United States) Margaret Osborne	(United States) Louise Brough	8–6, 3–6, 8–6
San Francisco	1945	(United States) Pauline Betz	(United States) Margaret Osborne	6–2, 7–5
San Francisco	1946	Not Held		
San Francisco	1947	(United States) Margaret Osborne	(United States) Barbara Krase	6–4, 6–1
San Francisco	1948*	(United States) Gussie Moran	(United States) Virginia Wolfenden Kovacs	2–6, 6–1, 6–2
San Francisco	1949*	(United States) Doris Hart	(United States) Dorothy Head Knode	6–3, 6–4
Berkeley	1950*	(United States) Patricia Canning Todd	(Romania) Magda Rurac	6–2, 6–1
Berkeley	1951	(United States) Dorothy Head Knode	(United States) Anita Kanter	4–6, 13–11, 6–0
Berkeley	1952	(United States) Shirley Fry Irvin	(Australia) Thelma Coyne Long	7–9, 6–2, 6–4
Berkeley	1953	(United States) Maureen Connolly	(United States) Shirley Fry Irvin	6–0, 9–7
Berkeley	1954	(United States) Virginia Wolfenden Kovacs	(United Kingdom) Anne Shilcock	9–7, 6–1
Berkeley	1955	(United Kingdom) Angela Mortimer	(United Kingdom) Shirley Bloomer	4–6, 6–3, 6–4
Berkeley	1956	(United States) Shirley Bloomer	(United States) Dorothy Bundy Cheney	6–0, 6–1
Berkeley	1957	(United States) Althea Gibson	(United States) Louise Brough	6–4, 6–3
Berkeley	1958	(United Kingdom) Christine Truman	(United States) Darlene Hard	6–2, 6–4
Berkeley	1959	(United States) Dorothy Head Knode	(United Kingdom) Ann Haydon	7–5, 6–4
Berkeley	1960	(United States) Darlene Hard	(United Kingdom) Ann Haydon	6–2, 6–3
Berkeley	1961	(United States) Darlene Hard	(United Kingdom) Ann Haydon	3–6, 7–5, 6–3
Berkeley	1962	(United States) Darlene Hard	(South Africa) Renée Schuurman	6–3, 6–3
Berkeley	1963	(United States) Darlene Hard	(Brazil) Maria Bueno	6–3, 6–3
Berkeley	1964	(Australia) Judy Tegart	(United States) Mimi Arnold	6–2, 6–4
Berkeley	1965	(Australia) Judy Tegart	(United States) Rosemary Casals	6–4, 3–6, 7–5
Berkeley	1966	(Brazil) Maria Bueno	(United States) Rosemary Casals	6–4, 2–6, 6–1
Berkeley	1967	(France) Françoise Dürr	(United States) Carole Caldwell Graebner	6–4, 6–3
Berkeley	1968	(Australia) Margaret Court	(Brazil) Maria Bueno	6–4, 7–5
Berkeley	1969	(Australia) Margaret Court	(United Kingdom) Winnie Shaw	6–4, 5–7, 6–0
Berkeley	1970	(Australia) Nancy Richey	(United States) Rosemary Casals	7–6, 6–4
Berkeley	1971	(United States) Marcie Louie	(United States) Barbara Downs	7–5, 6–3
Albany	1972	(Australia) Margaret Court	(United States) Billie Jean King	6–2, 6–4

- From 1948 through 1950, the Pacific Coast Championships were combined with the U.S. Women's Hardcourt Championships.

=== Men's doubles ===
Location	Year	Champions	Runners-up	Score
Berkeley	1924	(United States) Howard Kinsey (United States) Clarence Griffin	(United States) Roland Roberts (United States) Elia Fottrell	default
Berkeley	1930	(United States) Wilmer Allison (United States) John Van Ryn	(United States) Cranston Holman (United States) Gerald Stratford	7–5, 6–3, 6–0
San Francisco	1931	(United States) Lester Stoefen (United States) Sidney Wood	(United Kingdom) Pat Hughes (United Kingdom) Fred Perry	6–4, 6–4, 6–3
San Francisco	1932	(United States) Phil Neer (United States) Ed Levy	(Empire of Japan) Jiro Satoh (Empire of Japan) Takao Kuwabara	6–1, 6–1, 0–6, 1–6, 6–3
San Francisco	1933	(United States) Gerald Stratford (United States) Phil Neer	(United States) Joe Coughlin (United States) Lester Stoefen	6–2, 6–3, 6–4
Berkeley	1934	(United States) Don Budge (United States) Gene Mako	(United States) Gerald Statford (United States) Phil Neer	6–3, 8–6, 3–6, 6–1
Berkeley	1935	(United States) Don Budge (United States) Gene Smith	(United States) Wayne Sabin (United States) Howard Blethn	6–2, 6–3, 7–5
Berkeley	1936	(United States) Don Budge (United States) Henry Culley	(United States) Wayne Sabin (United States) Elwood Cooke	6–4, 9–7, 6–3
Berkeley	1938	(Australia) Harry Hopman (Australia) Leonard Schwartz	(Australia) Jack Bromwich (Australia) Adrian Quist	7–5, 2–6, 6–1, 6–0
San Francisco	1944	(United States) Gerald Stratford (United States) Howard Blethen	(United States) Jack Gurley (United States) Nick Carter	5–7, 8–6, 6–4
San Francisco	1945	(United States) Tom Brown (United States) Harry Buttimer	(United States) Edwin Amark (United States) Myron McNamara	8–1, 6–3, 6–4
San Francisco	1946	(United States) Jack Kramer (United States) Bob Falkenburg	(United States) Seymour Greenberg (Sweden) Lennart Bergelin	6–3, 6–3, 9–7
Berkeley	1949	(United States) Ted Schroeder (South Africa) Eric Sturgess	(Czechoslovakia) Jaroslav Drobný (Czechoslovakia) Vladimír Černík	6–3, 4–6, 7–9, 6–4
Berkeley	1951	(United States) Ted Schroeder (United States) Budge Patty	(United States) Vic Seixas (United States) Hamilton Richardson	5–7, 6–3, 6–2, 7–5
Berkeley	1952	(United States) Dick Savitt (United States) Vic Seixas	(United States) Art Larsen (United States) Noel Brown	2–6, 6–4, 2–6, 6–2, 7–5
Berkeley	1953	(United States) Tony Trabert (United States) Vic Seixas	(Argentina) Enrique Morea (United States) Hugh Stewart	6–4, 6–2, 6–4
Berkeley	1955	(United States) Tony Trabert (United States) Vic Seixas	(Argentina) Enrique Morea (United Kingdom) Roger Becker	6–3, 6–4
Berkeley	1956	(United States) Sidney Schwartz (United States) Hugh Stewart	(Chile) Luis Ayala (Sweden) Ulf Schmidt	6–4, 3–6, 7–5
Berkeley	1957	(Denmark) Kurt Nielsen (Australia) Bob Howe	(Sweden) Sven Davidson (Chile) Luis Ayala	4–6, 22–20, 6–3
Berkeley	1959	(United States) Noel Brown (United States) Hugh Stewart	(United States) Barry MacKay (United States) Bill Quillian	6–4, 10–8, 1–6, 7–5
Berkeley	1960	(United States) Cliff Mayne (United States) Hugh Ditzler	(United States) Bill Crosby (United States) Whitney Reed	5–7, 6–4, 6–4, 6–2
Berkeley	1963	(Mexico) Rafael Osuna (Mexico) Antonio Palafox	(United States) Bill Bond (United States) Tom Edlefsen	4–6, 6–4, 6–4, 6–4
Berkeley	1967	(United States) Marty Riessen (United States) Clark Graebner	(South Africa) Bob Hewitt (South Africa) Raymond Moore	6–4, 12–10
Berkeley	↓ Open Era ↓			
Berkeley	1969	(United States) Stan Smith (Brazil) Thomas Koch	(Australia) Terry Addison (Australia) Ray Keldie	6–1, 6–3
Berkeley	1970	(United States) Bob Lutz (United States) Stan Smith	(United States) Roy Barth (United States) Tom Gorman	6–2, 7–5, 4–6, 6–2
Berkeley	1971	(Australia) Roy Emerson (Australia) Rod Laver	(Australia) Ken Rosewall (Australia) Fred Stolle	6–3, 6–3
Albany	1972	(South Africa) Bob Hewitt (South Africa) Frew McMillan	(Sweden) Ove Nils Bengtson (Sweden) Björn Borg	6–4, 6–2
San Francisco	1973	(Australia) Roy Emerson (United States) Stan Smith	(Sweden) Ove Nils Bengtson (United States) Jim McManus	6–2, 6–1
San Francisco	1974	(United States) Bob Lutz (United States) Stan Smith	(Australia) John Alexander (Australia) Syd Ball	7–5, 6–7^{(5–7)}, 6–4
San Francisco	1975	(United States) Fred McNair (United States) Sherwood Stewart	(Australia) Allan Stone (Australia) Kim Warwick	6–2, 7–6^{(7–3)}
San Francisco	1976	(United States) Dick Stockton (United States) Roscoe Tanner	(United States) Brian Gottfried (South Africa) Bob Hewitt	6–3, 6–4
San Francisco	1977	(United States) Marty Riessen (United States) Dick Stockton	(United States) Fred McNair (United States) Sherwood Stewart	6–4, 1–6, 6–4
San Francisco	1978	(United States) Peter Fleming (United States) John McEnroe	(United States) Bob Lutz (United States) Stan Smith	5–7, 6–4, 6–4
San Francisco	1979	(United States) Peter Fleming (United States) John McEnroe	(Poland) Wojtek Fibak (South Africa) Frew McMillan	6–2, 6–3
San Francisco	1980	(United States) Peter Fleming (United States) John McEnroe	(United States) Gene Mayer (United States) Sandy Mayer	6–4, 6–3,
San Francisco	1981	(United States) Peter Fleming (United States) John McEnroe	(Australia) Mark Edmondson (United States) Sherwood Stewart	6–2, 6–2
San Francisco	1982	(United States) Fritz Buehning (United States) Brian Teacher	(United States) Martin Davis (United States) Chris Dunk	6–7^{(5–7)}, 6–2, 7–5
San Francisco	1983	(United States) Peter Fleming (United States) John McEnroe	(Czechoslovakia) Ivan Lendl (United States) Vincent Van Patten	6–1, 6–2
San Francisco	1984	(United States) Peter Fleming (United States) John McEnroe	(United States) Mike De Palmer (United States) Sammy Giammalva, Jr.	6–3, 6–4
San Francisco	1985	(United States) Paul Annacone (South Africa) Christo van Rensburg	(United States) Brad Gilbert (United States) Sandy Mayer	3–6, 6–3, 6–4
San Francisco	1986	(United States) Peter Fleming (United States) John McEnroe	(United States) Mike De Palmer (United States) Gary Donnelly	6–4, 7–6
San Francisco	1987	(United States) Jim Grabb (United States) Patrick McEnroe	(United States) Glenn Layendecker (United States) Todd Witsken	6–2, 0–6, 6–4
San Francisco	1988	(United States) John McEnroe (Australia) Mark Woodforde	(United States) Rick Leach (United States) Jim Pugh	6–4, 7–6
San Francisco	1989	(South Africa) Pieter Aldrich (South Africa) Danie Visser	(United States) Paul Annacone (South Africa) Christo van Rensburg	6–4, 6–3
San Francisco	1990	(United States) Kelly Jones (United States) Robert Van't Hof	(United States) Glenn Layendecker (United States) Richey Reneberg	2–6, 7–6, 6–3
San Francisco	1991	(Australia) Wally Masur (Australia) Jason Stoltenberg	(Sweden) Ronnie Båthman (Sweden) Rikard Bergh	4–6, 7–6, 6–4
San Francisco	1992	(United States) Jim Grabb (United States) Richey Reneberg	(South Africa) Pieter Aldrich (South Africa) Danie Visser	6–4, 7–5
San Francisco	1993	(United States) Scott Davis (Netherlands) Jacco Eltingh	(United States) Patrick McEnroe (United States) Jonathan Stark	6–1, 4–6, 7–5
San Jose	1994	(United States) Rick Leach (United States) Jared Palmer	(Zimbabwe) Byron Black (United States) Jonathan Stark	4–6, 6–4, 6–4
San Jose	1995	(United States) Jim Grabb (United States) Patrick McEnroe	(United States) Alex O'Brien (Australia) Sandon Stolle	3–6, 7–5, 6–0
San Jose	1996	(United States) Trevor Kronemann (Australia) David Macpherson	(United States) Richey Reneberg (United States) Jonathan Stark	6–4, 3–6, 6–3
San Jose	1997	(United States) Brian MacPhie (South Africa) Gary Muller	(The Bahamas) Mark Knowles (Canada) Daniel Nestor	4–6, 7–6, 7–5
San Jose	1998	(Australia) Todd Woodbridge (Australia) Mark Woodforde	(Brazil) Nelson Aerts (Brazil) André Sá	6–1, 7–5
San Jose	1999	(Australia) Todd Woodbridge (Australia) Mark Woodforde	(North Macedonia) Aleksandar Kitinov (Federal Republic of Yugoslavia) Nenad Zimonjić	7–5, 6–7^{(3–7)}, 6–4
San Jose	2000	(United States) Jan-Michael Gambill (United States) Scott Humphries	(Argentina) Lucas Arnold Ker (Philippines) Eric Taino	6–1, 6–4
San Jose	2001	(The Bahamas) Mark Knowles (United States) Brian MacPhie	(United States) Jan-Michael Gambill (United States) Jonathan Stark	6–3, 7–6^{(7–4)}
San Jose	2002	(Zimbabwe) Wayne Black (Zimbabwe) Kevin Ullyett	(South Africa) John-Laffnie de Jager (South Africa) Robbie Koenig	6–3, 4–6, 10–5
San Jose	2003	(South Korea) Hyung-Taik Lee (Belarus) Vladimir Voltchkov	(United States) Paul Goldstein (United States) Robert Kendrick	7–5, 4–6, 6–3
San Jose	2004	(United States) James Blake (United States) Mardy Fish	(United States) Rick Leach (United States) Brian MacPhie	6–2, 7–5
San Jose	2005	(Australia) Wayne Arthurs (Australia) Paul Hanley	(Switzerland) Yves Allegro (Germany) Michael Kohlmann	7–6^{(7–4)}, 6–4
San Jose	2006	(United States) John McEnroe (Sweden) Jonas Björkman	(United States) Paul Goldstein (United States) Jim Thomas	7–6 ^{(7–2)}, 4–6, 10–7
San Jose	2007	(United States) Eric Butorac (United Kingdom) Jamie Murray	(South Africa) Chris Haggard (Germany) Rainer Schüttler	7–5, 7–6^{(8–6)}
San Jose	2008	(United States) Scott Lipsky (United States) David Martin	(United States) Bob Bryan (United States) Mike Bryan	7–6^{(7–4)}, 7–5
San Jose	2009	(Germany) Tommy Haas (Czech Republic) Radek Štěpánek	(India) Rohan Bopanna (Finland) Jarkko Nieminen	6–2, 6–3
San Jose	2010	(United States) Mardy Fish (United States) Sam Querrey	(Germany) Benjamin Becker (Argentina) Leonardo Mayer	7–6^{(7–3)}, 7–5
San Jose	2011	(United States) Scott Lipsky (United States) Rajeev Ram	(Colombia) Alejandro Falla (Belgium) Xavier Malisse	6–4, 4–6, [10–8]
San Jose	2012	(The Bahamas) Mark Knowles (Belgium) Xavier Malisse	(South Africa) Kevin Anderson (Germany) Frank Moser	6–4, 1–6, [10–5]
San Jose	2013	(Belgium) Xavier Malisse (Germany) Frank Moser	(Australia) Lleyton Hewitt (Australia) Marinko Matosevic	6–0, 6–7^{(5–7)}, [10–4]

=== Women's doubles ===
Location	Year	Champions	Runners-up	Score
Berkeley	1923	(United States) Hazel Hotchkiss Wightman (United States) Helen Wills	(United States) J.C. Cushing (United States) Carmen Tarillon	6–2, 6–2
Berkeley	1924	(United States) Avery Filett (United States) Carolyn Swartz	(United States) Ream Leachman (United States) Golda Gross	1–6, 6–1, 6–4
Berkeley	1930	(United States) Anna McCune Harper (United States) Edith Cross	(United States) Marjorie Gladman (United States) Marjorie Morrill	4–6, 6–3, 6–2
San Francisco	1932	(United States) Edith Cross (United States) Anna McCune Harper	(United States) Alice Marble (United States) Golda Gross	6–3, 6–2
San Francisco	1933	(United Kingdom) Dorothy Round (United Kingdom) Mary Heeley	(United States) Alice Marble (United States) Elizabeth Ryan	1–6, 6–2, 6–4
Berkeley	1934	(United Kingdom) Freda James (United Kingdom) Betty Nuthall	(United States) Gussie Raegener (United States) Margaret Osborne	6–3, 6–2
Berkeley	1937	(United Kingdom) Kay Stammers (United Kingdom) Freda James	(United States) Helen Jacobs (United States) Dorothy Workman	6–4, 6–4
Berkeley	1940	(United States) Mary Hardwick (United States) Margaret Osborne	(United States) Gracyn Wheeler (United States) Jacque Nelson	6–4, 6–4
San Francisco	1945	(United States) Margaret Osborne (United States) Louise Brough	(United States) Dorothy Head Knode (United States) Phyliss Hunter	6–1, 6–3
San Francisco	1946	(United States) Margaret Osborne (United States) Barbara Krase	(United States) Dorothy Head Knode (United States) Phyliss Hunter	6–2, 6–1
Berkeley	1949	(United States) Gussie Moran (United States) Virginia Wolfenden Kovacs	(United States) Doris Hart (United States) Shirley Fry Irvin	6–2, 6–4
Berkeley	1951	(United States) Dorothy Head Knode (United States) Janet Hopps	(United Kingdom) Patricia Ward Hales (United Kingdom) Helen Fletcher	6–1, 6–2
Berkeley	1953	(United States) Maureen Connolly (Australia) Nell Hall Hopman	(United States) Dorothy Bundy Cheney (United States) Margaret Warren	6–3, 9–7
Berkeley	1955	(United Kingdom) Angela Mortimer (United Kingdom) Angela Buxton	(United Kingdom) Shirley Bloomer (United States) Barbara Bradley	7–5, 6–3
Berkeley	1956	(United Kingdom) Shirley Bloomer (Mexico) Marta Hernández	(United States) Dorothy Bundy Cheney (United States) Margaret Warren	6–3, 6–0
Berkeley	1957	(United States) Janet Hopps (Australia) Mary Bevis Hawton	(United States) Louise Brough (United States) Barbara Scofield Davidson	3–6, 6–4, 6–2
Berkeley	1959	(United States) Janet Hopps (United States) Farel Footman	(United Kingdom) Ann Haydon (United States) Dorothy Head Knode	5–7, 6–4, 6–4
Berkeley	1960	(United States) Darlene Hard (Brazil) Maria Bueno	(United States) Christine Truman (United Kingdom) Ann Haydon	6–2, 6–2
Berkeley	1963	(United States) Darlene Hard (Brazil) Maria Bueno	(United Kingdom) Deidre Catt (United Kingdom) Elizabeth Starkie	6–0, 6–4
Berkeley	1965	(Australia) Judy Tegart (United States) Carole Caldwell Graebner	(United States) Rosemary Casals (United States) Ceci Martinez	6–1, 6–2
Berkeley	1967	(United States) Rosemary Casals (United States) Billie Jean King	(France) Françoise Dürr (Australia) Judy Tegart	6–3, 6–4
Berkeley	1969	(Australia) Margaret Court (Australia) Lesley Hunt	(Australia) Kerry Harris (United Kingdom) Winnie Shaw	6–3, 6–4

=== Mixed doubles ===
Location	Year	Champions	Runners-up	Score
Berkeley	1930	(United States) Helen Wills (United States) George Lott	(United States) Edith Cross (United States) Wilmer Allison	6–2, 7–5
San Francisco	1931	(United States) Helen Wills (United States) George Lott	(United States) Edith Cross (United States) Pat Hughes	6–3, 3–6, 6–0
Berkeley	1935	(United Kingdom) Freda James (United States) Don Budge	(United States) Ethel Babcock (United States) Wilmer Hines	11–9, 6–4
Berkeley	1936	(United States) Helen Wills Moody (United States) Don Budge	(United States) Helen Jacobs (United States) Henry Culley	5–7, 10–8, 6–4
Berkeley	1937	(United States) Helen Wills Moody (United States) Don Budge	(United Kingdom) Kay Stammers (United States) Gerald Stratford	6–2, 4–6, 6–3
Berkeley	1940	(United States) Virginia Wolfenden (United States) Jack Kramer	(United States) Valerie Scott (United States) Bobby Riggs	7–5, 3–6, 6–4
San Francisco	1944	(Australia) Margaret Osborne (United States) Lt. Edwin Amark	(United States) Virginia Kovacs (United States) Pvt. Tom Brown	6–4, 2–6, 7–5
San Francisco	1945	(Australia) Virginia Kovacs (United States) Pfc. Tom Brown	(United States) Pauline Betz (United States) Capt. Myron McNamara	7–5, 6–3
Berkeley	1949	(United States) Doris Hart (South Africa) Eric Sturgess	(United States) Wilma Smith (Italy) Gianni Cucelli	6–1, 11–9
Berkeley	1951	(Australia) Virginia Kovacs (United States) Conway Catton	(United States) Anita Kanter (United States) Fed Fisher	6–4, 7–5
Berkeley	1953	(United States) Shirley Fry Irvin (Argentina) Enrique Morea	(United States) Dorothy Bundy Cheney (United States) Gil Shea	6–2, 6–4
Berkeley	1955	(United States) Barbara Bradley (United States) Enrique Morea	(United Kingdom) Barbara Buxton (United States) Gardnar Mulloy	6–3 (only one set played)
Berkeley	1959	(United States) Janet Hopps (India) Ramanathan Krishnan	(United States) Mary Ann Mitchell (United States) Don Kirbow	6–2, 6–3
Berkeley	1960	(United States) Carole Caldwell Graebner (United States) Chris Caldwell	(United States) Billie Jean Moffitt (Mexico) Antonio Palafox	4–6, 6–3, 6–4
Berkeley	1965	(Australia) Judy Tegart (United States) Jim McManus	(United States) Lynn Abbes (United States) Donald Dell	6–2, 6–1
Berkeley	1967	(United States) Rosemary Casals (United States) Marty Riessen	(United States) Judy Heldman (Denmark) Torben Ulrich	6–1, 6–4

== See also ==
- Pacific Southwest Championships – tournament held in Los Angeles from 1927 through 2012.
