= 2007 Mirage Cup – Doubles =

Doubles
- 2007 Tennis Channel Open and the Mirage Cup

Final
- Champions: (Belarus) Victoria Azarenka (Belarus) Tatiana Poutchek
- Runners-up: (Estonia) Maret Ani (Italy) Alberta Brianti
- Score: 6–2, 6–4

Events
Singles	men	women
Doubles	men	women
← 2006 ·	Tennis Channel Open	· 2008 →
← 2006 ·	Mirage Cup	· 2008 →

The women's doubles draw for the 2007 Mirage Cup.

Victoria Azarenka and Tatiana Poutchek defeated Maret Ani and Alberta Brianti in the final, 6–2, 6–4.

== Seeds ==
1. (Slovakia) Jarmila Gajdošová / (Japan) Akiko Morigami (semifinals)
2. (Russia) Ekaterina Bychkova / (Finland) Emma Laine (first round)
3. (South Africa) Natalie Grandin / (United States) Raquel Kops-Jones (quarterfinals)
4. (Belarus) Victoria Azarenka / (Belarus) Tatiana Poutchek (champions)

== Draw ==
=== Key ===
- Q = Qualifier
- WC = Wild card
- LL = Lucky loser
- Alt = Alternate
- SE = Special exempt
- PR = Protected ranking
- ITF = ITF entry
- JE = Junior exempt
- w/o = Walkover
- r = Retired
- d = Defaulted
- SR = Special ranking

=== Draw ===
First round
1	(Slovakia) J Gajdošová (Japan) A Morigami	6	6
(Latvia) L Dekmeijere (France) S Foretz	3	3
(United States) J Cohen (United States) A Weinhold	0	5
Q	(United States) A Haynes (Czech Republic) S Záhlavová	6	7
4	(Belarus) V Azarenka (Belarus) T Poutchek	6	6
(Canada) M Drake (Canada) S Dubois	4	1
WC	(United States) G Brodsky (United States) A Muhammad	0	7	4
WC	(United States) L Osterloh (United States) A Rolle	6	5	6
(Estonia) M Ani (Italy) A Brianti	6	6
(Sweden) S Arvidsson (United Kingdom) K O'Brien	3	0
(Romania) E Gallovits (Denmark) C Wozniacki	6^{5}	2
3	(South Africa) N Grandin (United States) R Kops-Jones	7^{7}	6
Q	(Germany) K Barrois (Germany) T Malek	6	6
(Australia) M Adamczak (Canada) ME Pelletier	3	4
(New Zealand) M Erakovic (Czech Republic) R Voráčová	6	6
2	(Russia) E Bychkova (Finland) E Laine	3	4

Quarterfinals
1	(Slovakia) J Gajdošová (Japan) A Morigami	6	6
Q	(United States) A Haynes (Czech Republic) S Záhlavová	1	2
4	(Belarus) V Azarenka (Belarus) T Poutchek
WC	(United States) L Osterloh (United States) A Rolle	w	/	o
(Estonia) M Ani (Italy) A Brianti	6	6
3	(South Africa) N Grandin (United States) R Kops-Jones	4	1
Q	(Germany) K Barrois (Germany) T Malek	6	7^{8}
(New Zealand) M Erakovic (Czech Republic) R Voráčová	3	6^{6}

Semifinals
1	(Slovakia) J Gajdošová (Japan) A Morigami	6^{4}	4
4	(Belarus) V Azarenka (Belarus) T Poutchek	7^{7}	6
(Estonia) M Ani (Italy) A Brianti	6	2	7
Q	(Germany) K Barrois (Germany) T Malek	4	6	5

Finals
4	(Belarus) V Azarenka (Belarus) T Poutchek	6	6
(Estonia) M Ani (Italy) A Brianti	2	4

== Qualifying ==
=== Seeds ===
1. (Germany) Kristina Barrois / (Germany) Tatjana Malek (qualified)
2. (United States) Angela Haynes / (Czech Republic) Sandra Záhlavová (qualified)

=== Qualifiers ===
1. (Germany) Kristina Barrois / (Germany) Tatjana Malek
2. (United States) Angela Haynes / (Czech Republic) Sandra Záhlavová

=== Qualifying draw ===
==== First qualifier ====
Qualifying competition
1	(Germany) Kristina Barrois (Germany) Tatjana Malek	4	2	4
Alt	(Argentina) Erica Krauth (Sweden) Hanna Nooni	0	4	2

==== Second qualifier ====
Qualifying competition
2	(United States) Angela Haynes (Czech Republic) Sandra Záhlavová	4	1	4
WC	(United States) Kim-Anh Nguyen (United States) Jennifer Tuchband	0	4	1
