= 2007 Mirage Cup – Singles =

Singles
- 2007 Tennis Channel Open and the Mirage Cup

Final
- Champion: (Denmark) Caroline Wozniacki
- Runner-up: (Japan) Akiko Morigami
- Score: 6–3, 6–2

Events
Singles	men	women
Doubles	men	women
← 2006 ·	Tennis Channel Open	· 2008 →
← 2006 ·	Mirage Cup	· 2008 →

Caroline Wozniacki defeated Akiko Morigami in the final 6–3, 6–2.

== Seeds ==
1. (Japan) Akiko Morigami (final)
2. (Sweden) Sofia Arvidsson (first round)
3. (Belarus) Victoria Azarenka (second round)
4. (Ukraine) Julia Vakulenko (semifinals)
5. (Russia) Ekaterina Bychkova (first round)
6. (Italy) Alberta Brianti (quarterfinals)
7. (Slovakia) Jarmila Gajdošová (semifinals)
8. (Uzbekistan) Varvara Lepchenko (quarterfinals)

== Draw ==
=== Key ===
- Q = Qualifier
- WC = Wild card
- LL = Lucky loser
- Alt = Alternate
- SE = Special exempt
- PR = Protected ranking
- ITF = ITF entry
- JE = Junior exempt
- w/o = Walkover
- r = Retired
- d = Defaulted
- SR = Special ranking

=== Finals ===
Semifinals
1	(Japan) Akiko Morigami	7	6
7	(Slovakia) Jarmila Gajdošová	5	1
WC/4	(Ukraine) Julia Vakulenko	0	7	1
(Denmark) Caroline Wozniacki	6	5	6

Final
1	(Japan) Akiko Morigami	3	2
(Denmark) Caroline Wozniacki	6	6

=== Top half ===
First round
1	(Japan) A Morigami	7	6
Q	(Belarus) K Milevskaya	5	1
Q	(United States) A Haynes	6^{4}	6	6
WC	(United States) A Stevenson	7^{7}	1	1
(Germany) T Malek	6	6^{1}	6
(Czech Republic) R Voráčová	3	7^{7}	3
(Canada) S Dubois	4	6^{5}
6	(Italy) A Brianti	6	7^{7}
3	(Belarus) V Azarenka	6	6
(United States) L Lee-Waters	0	2
(Belarus) T Poutchek	6	7^{7}
WC	(Croatia) P Martić	3	6^{4}
(United States) A Rolle	3	6	7
Q	(Italy) A Serra Zanetti	6	1	5
(Germany) K Barrois	3	6	3
7	(Slovakia) J Gajdošová	6	2	6

Second round
1	(Japan) A Morigami	6	6
Q	(United States) A Haynes	4	1
(Germany) T Malek	1	2
6	(Italy) A Brianti	6	6
3	(Belarus) V Azarenka	6	2	1
(Belarus) T Poutchek	4	6	6
(United States) A Rolle	0	2
7	(Slovakia) J Gajdošová	6	6

Quarterfinals
1	(Japan) A Morigami	6	6
6	(Italy) A Brianti	3	4
(Belarus) T Poutchek	4	3
7	(Slovakia) J Gajdošová	6	6

Semifinals
1	(Japan) A Morigami	7	6
7	(Slovakia) J Gajdošová	5	1

=== Bottom half ===
First round
8	(Uzbekistan) V Lepchenko	6	6
(Finland) E Laine	2	1
(United States) L Osterloh	6	6
(France) S Foretz	3	1
(Romania) E Gallovits	3	6	6
(United States) A Spears	6	1	1
(Canada) A Wozniak	6^{7}	5
WC/4	(Ukraine) J Vakulenko	7^{9}	7
5	(Russia) E Bychkova	7	4	2
(Hungary) M Czink	5	6	6
(Belgium) K Flipkens	1	0
(Denmark) C Wozniacki	6	6
(France) Y Fedossova	2	7^{7}	6
WC	(United States) A Muhammad	6	6^{1}	4
Q	(Argentina) B Jozami	6	6
2	(Sweden) S Arvidsson	2	1

Second round
8	(Uzbekistan) V Lepchenko	w/o
(United States) L Osterloh
(Romania) E Gallovits	6^{5}	3
WC/4	(Ukraine) J Vakulenko	7^{7}	6
(Hungary) M Czink	1	3
(Denmark) C Wozniacki	6	6
(France) Y Fedossova	6^{2}	2
Q	(Argentina) B Jozami	7^{7}	6

Quarterfinals
8	(Uzbekistan) V Lepchenko	0	1
WC/4	(Ukraine) J Vakulenko	6	6
(Denmark) C Wozniacki	6	6
Q	(Argentina) B Jozami	1	0

Semifinals
WC/4	(Ukraine) J Vakulenko	0	7	1
(Denmark) C Wozniacki	6	5	6

== Qualifying ==
=== Seeds ===
1. (Estonia) Maret Ani (first round)
2. (France) Mathilde Johansson (second round)
3. (Czech Republic) Sandra Záhlavová (qualifying competition)
4. (New Zealand) Marina Erakovic (second round)
5. (China) Yuan Meng (qualifying competition)
6. (United Kingdom) Anne Keothavong (first round, retired)
7. (Japan) Shiho Hisamatsu (second round)
8. (Puerto Rico) Kristina Brandi (second round, withdrew)

=== Qualifiers ===
1. (United States) Angela Haynes
2. (Italy) Antonella Serra Zanetti
3. (Belarus) Ksenia Milevskaya
4. (Argentina) Betina Jozami

=== Qualifying draw ===
==== First qualifier ====
First round
1	(Estonia) Maret Ani	1	6	5
(United States) Raquel Kops-Jones	6	4	7
(Georgia (country)) Anna Tatishvili	6	6
WC	(Bulgaria) Elena Gantcheva	1	1
(United States) Angela Haynes	6	3	6
(Australia) Lauren Breadmore	0	6	4
(Latvia) Līga Dekmeijere	4	2
7	(Japan) Shiho Hisamatsu	6	6

Second round
(United States) Raquel Kops-Jones	5	6	1
(Georgia (country)) Anna Tatishvili	7	4	6
(United States) Angela Haynes	6	6
7	(Japan) Shiho Hisamatsu	2	1

Qualifying competition
(Georgia (country)) Anna Tatishvili	3	2
(United States) Angela Haynes	6	6

==== Second qualifier ====
First round
2	(France) Mathilde Johansson	7	6
(Russia) Lioudmila Skavronskaia	5	1
(Italy) Antonella Serra Zanetti	6	7
(Belarus) Olga Govortsova	4	5
WC	(United States) Gail Brodsky	2	4
(Indonesia) Romana Tedjakusuma	6	6
WC	(Thailand) Montinee Tangphong	4	2
5	(China) Yuan Meng	6	6

Second round
2	(France) Mathilde Johansson	3	4
(Italy) Antonella Serra Zanetti	6	6
(Indonesia) Romana Tedjakusuma	4	1
5	(China) Yuan Meng	6	6

Qualifying competition
(Italy) Antonella Serra Zanetti	4	7	6
5	(China) Yuan Meng	6	5	3

==== Third qualifier ====
First round
3	(Czech Republic) Sandra Záhlavová	6	1	6
(South Africa) Natalie Grandin	3	6	4
(United Kingdom) Katie O'Brien	6	6
(United States) Diana Ospina	2	1
(Puerto Rico) Vilmarie Castellvi	4	4
WC	(Belarus) Ksenia Milevskaya	6	6
WC	(United States) Ashley Weinhold	1	2
8	(Puerto Rico) Kristina Brandi	6	6

Second round
3	(Czech Republic) Sandra Záhlavová	6	4	6
(United Kingdom) Katie O'Brien	3	6	2
WC	(Belarus) Ksenia Milevskaya	w/o
8	(Puerto Rico) Kristina Brandi

Qualifying competition
3	(Czech Republic) Sandra Záhlavová	6	3	2
WC	(Belarus) Ksenia Milevskaya	4	6	6

==== Fourth qualifier ====
First round
4	(New Zealand) Marina Erakovic	7^{7}	7^{7}
(Australia) Monique Adamczak	6^{4}	6^{2}
(Romania) Anda Perianu	6	0
(United States) Tiffany Dabek	3	0^{r}
(Argentina) Betina Jozami	6	6
(Canada) Marie-Ève Pelletier	1	4
WC	(United States) Julia Cohen	5
6	(United Kingdom) Anne Keothavong	1^{r}

Second round
4	(New Zealand) Marina Erakovic	6^{7}	6	3
(Romania) Anda Perianu	7^{9}	2	6
(Argentina) Betina Jozami	6	6
WC	(United States) Julia Cohen	0	1

Qualifying competition
(Romania) Anda Perianu	6	5	3
(Argentina) Betina Jozami	3	7	6
