= 2003 Franklin Templeton Classic – Singles =

Tennis tournament

Singles
- 2003 Franklin Templeton Classic

Final
- Champion: (Australia) Lleyton Hewitt
- Runner-up: (Australia) Mark Philippoussis
- Score: 6–4, 6–4

Details
- Draw: 32
- Seeds: 8

Events
Singles	Doubles
← 2002 ·	Franklin Templeton Classic	· 2004 →

Andre Agassi was the defending champion but lost in the first round to Thomas Enqvist.

Lleyton Hewitt won in the final 6–4, 6–4 against Mark Philippoussis.

== Seeds ==
1. (Australia) Lleyton Hewitt (champion)
2. (United States) Andre Agassi (first round)
3. (Argentina) David Nalbandian (quarterfinals)
4. (Thailand) Paradorn Srichaphan (first round)
5. (Germany) Rainer Schüttler (second round)
6. (Spain) Àlex Corretja (quarterfinals)
7. (Argentina) Juan Ignacio Chela (first round)
8. (Belgium) Xavier Malisse (first round)

== Draw ==
=== Key ===
- Q = Qualifier
- WC = Wild card
- LL = Lucky loser
- Alt = Alternate
- SE = Special exempt
- PR = Protected ranking
- ITF = ITF entry
- JE = Junior exempt
- w/o = Walkover
- r = Retired
- d = Defaulted
- SR = Special ranking

=== Finals ===
Semifinals
WC/1	(Australia) Lleyton Hewitt	6	6
(United States) Taylor Dent	2	4
WC	(Australia) Mark Philippoussis	6	7^{10}
(Argentina) Mariano Zabaleta	3	6^{8}

Final
WC/1	(Australia) Lleyton Hewitt	6	6
WC	(Australia) Mark Philippoussis	4	4

=== Top half ===
First round
WC/1	(Australia) L Hewitt	6	6
(Spain) F Vicente	4	3
(South Africa) W Ferreira	7	6^{5}	6
(Australia) W Arthurs	5	7^{7}	2
(France) A Di Pasquale	6	3	6
(Peru) L Horna	2	6	3
Q	(Russia) D Tursunov	4	2
6	(Spain) À Corretja	6	6
4	(Thailand) P Srichaphan	6^{2}	2
Q	(Ecuador) G Lapentti	7^{7}	6
(Spain) D Sánchez	3	6	6
(Chile) N Massú	6	3	4
(United States) T Dent	6	7
(Romania) A Pavel	3	5
(United States) C Mamiit	7^{7}	7^{7}
8	(Belgium) X Malisse	6^{5}	6^{3}

Second round
WC/1	(Australia) L Hewitt	7	6
(South Africa) W Ferreira	5	1
(France) A Di Pasquale	6^{5}	6	1
6	(Spain) À Corretja	7^{7}	3	6
Q	(Ecuador) G Lapentti	3	6^{5}
(Spain) D Sánchez	6	7^{7}
(United States) T Dent	4	6	6
(United States) C Mamiit	6	2	0

Quarterfinals
WC/1	(Australia) L Hewitt	6	6
6	(Spain) À Corretja	4	2
(Spain) D Sánchez	1	3
(United States) T Dent	6	6

Semifinals
WC/1	(Australia) L Hewitt	6	6
(United States) T Dent	2	4

=== Bottom half ===
First round
7	(Argentina) J I Chela	6^{2}	6	1
WC	(Australia) M Philippoussis	7^{7}	3	6
LL	(Australia) S Draper	6	7^{7}
(Sweden) J Björkman	3	6^{5}
(Italy) D Sanguinetti	3	2
(Argentina) F Squillari	6	6
(Argentina) A Calleri	6^{3}	3
3	(Argentina) D Nalbandian	7^{7}	6
5	(Germany) R Schüttler	2	7	6
Q	(Israel) H Levy	6	5	1
(United States) R Ginepri	6^{6}	3
(Argentina) M Zabaleta	7^{8}	6
Q	(Australia) J Gooding	2	2
(United States) J Blake	6	6
WC	(Sweden) T Enqvist	6^{6}	6	6
2	(United States) A Agassi	7^{8}	4	1

Second round
WC	(Australia) M Philippoussis	6	6
LL	(Australia) S Draper	0	4
(Argentina) F Squillari	2	6^{5}
3	(Argentina) D Nalbandian	6	7^{7}
5	(Germany) R Schüttler	3	6	4
(Argentina) M Zabaleta	6	2	6
(United States) J Blake	7^{7}	6^{1}	6
WC	(Sweden) T Enqvist	6^{5}	7^{7}	2

Quarterfinals
WC	(Australia) M Philippoussis	0	6	6
3	(Argentina) D Nalbandian	6	3	4
(Argentina) M Zabaleta	3	6	6
(United States) J Blake	6	4	4

Semifinals
WC	(Australia) M Philippoussis	6	7^{10}
(Argentina) M Zabaleta	3	6^{8}
