= 2005 Tennis Channel Open =

- Date: February 21–28
- Edition: 18th
- Category: ATP International Series
- Draw: 32S / 16D
- Prize money: $355,000
- Surface: Hard / outdoor
- Location: Scottsdale, Arizona, U.S.

Champions

Singles
- (Australia) Wayne Arthurs

Doubles
- (United States) Bob Bryan / (United States) Mike Bryan
← 2004 ·	Tennis Channel Open	· 2006 →

The 2005 Tennis Channel Open was a men's tennis tournament held in Scottsdale, Arizona in the United States that was part of the ATP International Series of the 2005 ATP Tour. It was the 18th edition of the tournament and was held from February 21 to February 28, 2005. Unseeded Wayne Arthurs won the singles title.

== Finals ==
=== Singles ===
(Australia) Wayne Arthurs defeated (Croatia) Mario Ančić 7–5, 6–3

- It was Arthur's only singles title of his career. He became the oldest first-time title winner since the ATP World Tour was formed in 1990.

=== Doubles ===
(United States) Bob Bryan / (United States) Mike Bryan defeated (Australia) Wayne Arthurs / (Australia) Paul Hanley 7–5, 6–4

- It was Bob Bryan's 1st title of the year and the 22nd of his career. It was Mike Bryan's 1st title of the year and the 24th of his career.
