= 2004 Franklin Templeton Classic – Singles =

Tennis tournament

Singles
- 2004 Franklin Templeton Classic

Final
- Champion: (United States) Vince Spadea
- Runner-up: (Germany) Nicolas Kiefer
- Score: 7–5, 6–7^{(5–7)}, 6–3

Details
- Draw: 32
- Seeds: 8

Events
Singles	Doubles
← 2003 ·	Franklin Templeton Classic	· 2005 →

Lleyton Hewitt was the defending champion but did not compete that year.

Vince Spadea won in the final 7–5, 6–7^{(5–7)}, 6–3 against Nicolas Kiefer.

== Seeds ==
1. (United States) Andy Roddick (semifinals)
2. (Netherlands) Martin Verkerk (quarterfinals)
3. (United States) Robby Ginepri (quarterfinals)
4. (United States) Vince Spadea (champion)
5. (United States) ~~Taylor Dent~~ (withdrew because of an illness)
6. (United States) James Blake (quarterfinals)
7. (Germany) Nicolas Kiefer (final)
8. (South Africa) Wayne Ferreira (first round)

== Draw ==
=== Key ===
- Q = Qualifier
- WC = Wild card
- LL = Lucky loser
- Alt = Alternate
- SE = Special exempt
- PR = Protected ranking
- ITF = ITF entry
- JE = Junior exempt
- w/o = Walkover
- r = Retired
- d = Defaulted
- SR = Special ranking

=== Finals ===
Semifinals
1	(United States) Andy Roddick	7^{7}	3	4
4	(United States) Vince Spadea	6^{5}	6	6
7	(Germany) Nicolas Kiefer	4	7	6
(Romania) Victor Hănescu	6	5	4

Final
4	(United States) Vince Spadea	7	6^{5}	6
7	(Germany) Nicolas Kiefer	5	7^{7}	3

=== Top half ===
First round
1	(United States) A Roddick	6	7
(Netherlands) J van Lottum	3	5
Q	(Argentina) G Marcaccio	3	7	4
WC	(United States) A Bogomolov Jr.	6	5	6
WC	(United States) B Evans	1	4
(United States) J-M Gambill	6	6
(Germany) L Burgsmüller	6	3	7
LL	(United States) A Kim	4	6	5
4	(United States) V Spadea	6	6
WC	(Sweden) T Johansson	4	4
(Spain) À Corretja	1	4
(Australia) W Arthurs	6	6
(Russia) I Andreev	4	7^{7}	6
(Croatia) M Ančić	6	6^{5}	4
(Argentina) M Vassallo Argüello	3	1
6	(United States) J Blake	6	6

Second round
1	(United States) A Roddick	6	6
WC	(United States) A Bogomolov Jr.	4	3
(United States) J-M Gambill	7	7
(Germany) L Burgsmüller	5	5
4	(United States) V Spadea	6	6
(Australia) W Arthurs	3	2
(Russia) I Andreev	3	2
6	(United States) J Blake	6	6

Quarterfinals
1	(United States) A Roddick	6^{4}	6	6
(United States) J-M Gambill	7^{7}	4	3
4	(United States) V Spadea	6	2	7
6	(United States) J Blake	4	6	5

Semifinals
1	(United States) A Roddick	7^{7}	3	4
4	(United States) V Spadea	6^{5}	6	6

=== Bottom half ===
First round
7	(Germany) N Kiefer	6	6
(United States) B Vahaly	3	3
(Croatia) I Karlović	3	4
(Russia) D Tursunov	6	6
(South Africa) W Moodie	6^{6}	6	6
(France) A Dupuis	7^{8}	2	2
Q	(United States) T Phillips	2	0
3	(United States) R Ginepri	6	6
8	(South Africa) W Ferreira	1	2
(Romania) V Hănescu	6	6
(Belgium) X Malisse	3	6^{3}
(Sweden) R Söderling	6	7^{7}
Q	(United States) C Mamiit	6	4	6
(Monaco) J-R Lisnard	0	6	3
Q	(Switzerland) Y Allegro	3	2
2	(Netherlands) M Verkerk	6	6

Second round
7	(Germany) N Kiefer	6	6
(Russia) D Tursunov	4	4
(South Africa) W Moodie	6	6^{2}	4
3	(United States) R Ginepri	2	7^{7}	6
(Romania) V Hănescu	6	6^{5}	6
(Sweden) R Söderling	3	7^{7}	3
Q	(United States) C Mamiit	2	6	3
2	(Netherlands) M Verkerk	6	4	6

Quarterfinals
7	(Germany) N Kiefer	6	7^{8}
3	(United States) R Ginepri	3	6^{6}
(Romania) V Hănescu	7	6
2	(Netherlands) M Verkerk	5	4

Semifinals
7	(Germany) N Kiefer	4	7	6
(Romania) V Hănescu	6	5	4
