= 2007 Tennis Channel Open – Doubles =

Tennis tournament

Doubles
- 2007 Tennis Channel Open and the Mirage Cup

Final
- Champions: (United States) Bob Bryan (United States) Mike Bryan
- Runners-up: (Israel) Jonathan Erlich (Israel) Andy Ram
- Score: 7–6^{(8–6)}, 6–2

Events
Singles	men	women
Doubles	men	women
← 2006 ·	Tennis Channel Open	· 2008 →
← 2006 ·	Mirage Cup	· 2008 →

Bob Bryan and Mike Bryan were the defending champions and successfully defended their title, defeating Jonathan Erlich and Andy Ram 7–6^{(8–6)}, 6–2 in the final.

== Seeds ==
1. (United States) Bob Bryan / (United States) Mike Bryan (champions)
2. (Israel) Jonathan Erlich / (Israel) Andy Ram (final)
3. (Austria) Julian Knowle / (Austria) Jürgen Melzer (first round)
4. (Czech Republic) František Čermák / (Czech Republic) Jaroslav Levinský (quarterfinals)

== Draw ==
=== Key ===
- Q = Qualifier
- WC = Wild card
- LL = Lucky loser
- Alt = Alternate
- SE = Special exempt
- PR = Protected ranking
- ITF = ITF entry
- JE = Junior exempt
- w/o = Walkover
- r = Retired
- d = Defaulted
- SR = Special ranking

=== Draw ===
First round
1	(United States) B Bryan (United States) M Bryan	6	1	[12]
(South Africa) W Moodie (Australia) T Perry	3	6	[10]
(South Africa) C Haggard (Germany) B Phau	5	6	[10]
(France) M Llodra (France) PH Mathieu	7	2	[6]
4	(Czech Republic) F Čermák (Czech Republic) J Levinský	2	6	[10]
(Argentina) JM del Potro (Spain) F Verdasco	6	2	[8]
WC	(Paraguay) R Delgado (Brazil) G Kuerten	6	7^{9}
(Australia) S Huss (United States) T Phillips	2	6^{7}
(France) J Benneteau (France) N Mahut	7	4	[6]
(United States) P Goldstein (United States) J Thomas	5	6	[10]
(Australia) A Fisher (United Kingdom) J Murray	6	3	[10]
3	(Austria) J Knowle (Austria) J Melzer	4	6	[6]
(Thailand) Sa Ratiwatana (Thailand) So Ratiwatana	3	3
(Sweden) S Aspelin (Sweden) R Lindstedt	6	6
(Germany) B Becker (United States) B Reynolds	3	0
2	(Israel) J Erlich (Israel) A Ram	6	6

Quarterfinals
1	(United States) B Bryan (United States) M Bryan	6	6
(South Africa) C Haggard (Germany) B Phau	1	4
4	(Czech Republic) F Čermák (Czech Republic) J Levinský	2	2
WC	(Paraguay) R Delgado (Brazil) G Kuerten	6	6
(Australia) A Fisher (United Kingdom) J Murray	6	1	[10]
(United States) P Goldstein (United States) J Thomas	4	6	[8]
(Sweden) S Aspelin (Sweden) R Lindstedt	3	6^{4}
2	(Israel) J Erlich (Israel) A Ram	6	7^{7}

Semifinals
1	(United States) B Bryan (United States) M Bryan	6	6
WC	(Paraguay) R Delgado (Brazil) G Kuerten	4	1
(Australia) A Fisher (United Kingdom) J Murray	6^{3}	2
2	(Israel) J Erlich (Israel) A Ram	7^{7}	6

Final
1	(United States) B Bryan (United States) M Bryan	7^{8}	6
2	(Israel) J Erlich (Israel) A Ram	6^{6}	2
