= 2003 Franklin Templeton Classic – Doubles =

Tennis tournament

Doubles
- 2003 Franklin Templeton Classic

Final
- Champions: (United States) James Blake (The Bahamas) Mark Merklein
- Runners-up: (Australia) Lleyton Hewitt (Australia) Mark Philippoussis
- Score: 6–4, 6–7^{(2–7)}, 7–6^{(7–5)}

Details
- Draw: 16
- Seeds: 4

Events
Singles	Doubles
- Franklin Templeton Classic

Bob Bryan and Mike Bryan were the defending champions but lost in the quarterfinals to Wayne Arthurs and Paul Hanley.

James Blake and Mark Merklein won in the final 6–4, 6–7^{(2–7)}, 7–6^{(7–5)} against Lleyton Hewitt and Mark Philippoussis.

== Seeds ==
1. (The Bahamas) Mark Knowles / (Canada) Daniel Nestor (semifinals)
2. (United States) Bob Bryan / (United States) Mike Bryan (quarterfinals)
3. (United States) Donald Johnson / (United States) Jared Palmer (quarterfinals)
4. (South Africa) Chris Haggard / (United States) Brian MacPhie (first round)

== Draw ==
Key

- Q = Qualifier
- WC = Wild card
- LL = Lucky loser
- Alt = Alternate
- ITF = ITF entry
- PR = Protected ranking
- SR = Special ranking
- SE = Special exempt
- JE = Junior exempt
- JR = Junior Accelerator Programme entrant
- CO = College Accelerator Programme entrant
- NG = Next Gen Accelerator Program entrant
- w/o = Walkover
- r = Retired
- d = Defaulted

First round
1	(The Bahamas) M Knowles (Canada) D Nestor	w/o
(Argentina) J I Chela (Argentina) M Zabaleta
(Argentina) G Etlis (Argentina) M Rodríguez	6	6
(Argentina) L Arnold (Spain) À Corretja	3	3
4	(South Africa) C Haggard (United States) B MacPhie	5	6	1
(Belgium) X Malisse (Italy) D Sanguinetti	7	3	6
WC	(United States) T Dent (United States) R Ginepri	4	5
(United States) J Blake (The Bahamas) M Merklein	6	7
(Argentina) D Nalbandian (Argentina) S Prieto	3	6	1
WC	(Australia) L Hewitt (Australia) M Philippoussis	6	4	6
(Germany) M Kohlmann (Germany) R Schüttler	4	6	2
3	(United States) D Johnson (United States) J Palmer	6	3	6
(Japan) T Shimada (Thailand) P Srichaphan	7^{7}	2	2
(Australia) W Arthurs (Australia) P Hanley	6^{4}	6	6
(Romania) A Pavel (Spain) F Vicente	1	6^{5}
2	(United States) B Bryan (United States) M Bryan	6	7^{7}

Quarterfinals
1	(The Bahamas) M Knowles (Canada) D Nestor	6	6
(Argentina) G Etlis (Argentina) M Rodríguez	3	4
(Belgium) X Malisse (Italy) D Sanguinetti	6	4	6^{4}
(United States) J Blake (The Bahamas) M Merklein	1	6	7^{7}
WC	(Australia) L Hewitt (Australia) M Philippoussis	6	6
3	(United States) D Johnson (United States) J Palmer	3	4
(Australia) W Arthurs (Australia) P Hanley	7	5	6
2	(United States) B Bryan (United States) M Bryan	5	7	2

Semifinals
1	(The Bahamas) M Knowles (Canada) D Nestor	3	4
(United States) J Blake (The Bahamas) M Merklein	6	6
WC	(Australia) L Hewitt (Australia) M Philippoussis	7^{7}	6^{4}	2
(Australia) W Arthurs (Australia) P Hanley	6^{2}	7^{7}	1/r

Final
(United States) J Blake (The Bahamas) M Merklein	6	6^{2}	7^{7}
WC	(Australia) L Hewitt (Australia) M Philippoussis	4	7^{7}	6^{5}
