= 2006 Tennis Channel Open – Singles =

Tennis tournament

Singles
- 2006 Tennis Channel Open

Final
- Champion: (United States) James Blake
- Runner-up: (Australia) Lleyton Hewitt
- Score: 7–5, 2–6, 6–3

Details
- Draw: 32
- Seeds: 8

Events
Singles	Doubles
← 2005 ·	Tennis Channel Open	· 2007 →

Wayne Arthurs was the defending champion, but did not participate that year.

James Blake won the title, defeating Lleyton Hewitt 7–5, 2–6, 6–3 in the final.

== Seeds ==
1. (Australia) Lleyton Hewitt (final)
2. (Germany) Nicolas Kiefer (second round, withdrew because of an illness)
3. (Spain) Tommy Robredo (quarterfinals)
4. (United States) Robby Ginepri (first round)
5. (United States) James Blake (champion)
6. (France) Gaël Monfils (first round)
7. (Germany) ~~Tommy Haas~~ (withdrew because of a shoulder injury)
8. (Spain) Fernando Verdasco (first round)

== Draw ==
=== Key ===
- Q = Qualifier
- WC = Wild card
- LL = Lucky loser
- Alt = Alternate
- SE = Special exempt
- PR = Protected ranking
- ITF = ITF entry
- JE = Junior exempt
- w/o = Walkover
- r = Retired
- d = Defaulted
- SR = Special ranking

=== Finals ===
Semifinals
1	(Australia) Lleyton Hewitt	3	6	6
(United States) Paul Goldstein	6	1	0
(Croatia) Ivo Karlović	6^{2}	1
5	(United States) James Blake	7^{7}	6

Final
1	(Australia) Lleyton Hewitt	5	6	3
5	(United States) James Blake	7	2	6

=== Top half ===
First round
1	(Australia) L Hewitt	5	6	6
(Germany) F Mayer	7	2	4
Q	(Denmark) K Pless	3	3
(Czech Republic) J Hernych	6	6
(Sweden) R Söderling	4	6^{0}
SE	(France) J Benneteau	6	7^{7}
(Germany) P Kohlschreiber	6^{4}	7	6
8	(Spain) F Verdasco	7^{7}	5	2
4	(United States) R Ginepri	7^{7}	3	1
(United States) P Goldstein	6^{4}	6	6
Q	(Chile) P Capdeville	3	2
(United States) V Spadea	6	6
(Belarus) M Mirnyi	4	6	4
(Belgium) X Malisse	6	4	6
(Russia) D Tursunov	4	6^{7}
LL	(Australia) P Luczak	6	7^{9}

Second round
1	(Australia) L Hewitt	6	6
(Czech Republic) J Hernych	3	3
SE	(France) J Benneteau	3	2
(Germany) P Kohlschreiber	6	6
(United States) P Goldstein	6	6
(United States) V Spadea	2	1
(Belgium) X Malisse	6	4	6
LL	(Australia) P Luczak	4	6	4

Quarterfinals
1	(Australia) L Hewitt	6	6
(Germany) P Kohlschreiber	2	0
(United States) P Goldstein	6	2
(Belgium) X Malisse	3	0^{r}

Semifinals
1	(Australia) L Hewitt	3	6	6
(United States) P Goldstein	6	1	0

=== Bottom half ===
First round
6	(France) G Monfils	6^{8}	3
(Sweden) J Björkman	7^{10}	6
(Italy) D Sanguinetti	2	4
(Croatia) I Karlović	6	6
WC	(United States) M Fish	6	7^{7}
Q	(India) P Amritraj	4	6^{4}
(United Kingdom) A Murray	2	2
3	(Spain) T Robredo	6	6
5	(United States) J Blake	7^{7}	6
(Thailand) P Srichaphan	6^{3}	0
LL	(United States) B Vahaly	3	7^{7}	6
WC	(United States) S Querrey	6	6^{3}	3
(Czech Republic) T Zíb	4	3
(Denmark) K Carlsen	6	6
Q	(Armenia) S Sargsian	3	2
2	(Germany) N Kiefer	6	6

Second round
(Sweden) J Björkman	6	3	4
(Croatia) I Karlović	3	6	6
WC	(United States) M Fish	4	4
3	(Spain) T Robredo	6	6
5	(United States) J Blake	6	6
LL	(United States) B Vahaly	1	1
(Denmark) K Carlsen	w/o
2	(Germany) N Kiefer

Quarterfinals
(Croatia) I Karlović	7^{7}	6
3	(Spain) T Robredo	6^{4}	4
5	(United States) J Blake	6	6
(Denmark) K Carlsen	4	4

Semifinals
(Croatia) I Karlović	6^{2}	1
5	(United States) J Blake	7^{7}	6
