= 2008 Tennis Channel Open – Singles =

Tennis tournament

Singles
- 2008 Tennis Channel Open

Final
- Champion: (United States) Sam Querrey
- Runner-up: (South Africa) Kevin Anderson
- Score: 4–6, 6–3, 6–4

Details
- Draw: 32 (4Q / 3WC)
- Seeds: 8

Events
Singles	Doubles
← 2007 ·	Tennis Channel Open

Lleyton Hewitt was the defending champion, but lost in the second round to Julien Benneteau.

Unseeded Sam Querrey won in the final 4–6, 6–3, 6–4, against qualifier Kevin Anderson.

== Seeds ==
1. (Chile) Fernando González (second round)
2. (Australia) Lleyton Hewitt (second round)
3. (Cyprus) Marcos Baghdatis (second round)
4. (Argentina) Guillermo Cañas (semifinals)
5. (Italy) Potito Starace (second round, retired)
6. (France) Michaël Llodra (first round)
7. (Sweden) Robin Söderling (withdrew)
8. (Germany) Nicolas Kiefer (second round)

== Draw ==
=== Key ===
- Q = Qualifier
- WC = Wild card
- LL = Lucky loser
- Alt = Alternate
- SE = Special exempt
- PR = Protected ranking
- ITF = ITF entry
- JE = Junior exempt
- w/o = Walkover
- r = Retired
- d = Defaulted
- SR = Special ranking

=== Finals ===
Semifinals
Q	(South Africa) Kevin Anderson	7^{7}	6
WC	(United States) Robby Ginepri	6^{4}	4
4	(Argentina) Guillermo Cañas	5	2
(United States) Sam Querrey	7	6

Final
Q	(South Africa) Kevin Anderson	6	3	4
(United States) Sam Querrey	4	6	6

=== Top half ===
First round
1	(Chile) F González	6	7^{7}
(Israel) D Sela	2	6^{2}
(Argentina) S Roitman	4	6	3
(Russia) E Korolev	6	4	6
(Colombia) A Falla	6	3	4
WC	(United States) J Isner	4	6	6
Q	(South Africa) K Anderson	6	7^{7}
6	(France) M Llodra	2	6^{2}
3	(Cyprus) M Baghdatis	7^{7}	6
(United States) V Spadea	6^{5}	1
WC	(United States) R Ginepri	2	6	6
(Belgium) X Malisse	6	3	4
(Chile) N Massú	5	6	4
(Latvia) E Gulbis	7	4	6
Q	(Australia) P Luczak	6	1
LL	(Germany) M Zverev	2	0^{r}

Second round
1	(Chile) F González	3	6^{4}
(Russia) E Korolev	6	7^{7}
WC	(United States) J Isner	6^{2}	5
Q	(South Africa) K Anderson	7^{7}	7
3	(Cyprus) M Baghdatis	6^{2}	3
WC	(United States) R Ginepri	7^{7}	6
(Latvia) E Gulbis	6	6
Q	(Australia) P Luczak	2	1

Quarterfinals
(Russia) E Korolev	2	0
Q	(South Africa) K Anderson	6	6
WC	(United States) R Ginepri	6	6
(Latvia) E Gulbis	1	2

Semifinals
Q	(South Africa) K Anderson	7^{7}	6
WC	(United States) R Ginepri	6^{4}	4

=== Bottom half ===
First round
5	(Italy) P Starace	7^{7}	6
(Argentina) C Berlocq	6^{5}	0
Q	(United States) A Delić	7	7^{7}
(Austria) J Melzer	5	6^{2}
(Romania) V Hănescu	2	6	6^{5}
Q	(Australia) C Guccione	6	4	7^{7}
(Sweden) T Johansson	3	6^{3}
4	(Argentina) G Cañas	6	7^{7}
8	(Germany) N Kiefer	6	6
(Germany) B Becker	4	3
(United States) S Querrey	6	4	7^{10}
(France) S Grosjean	2	6	6^{8}
(France) J Benneteau	6	7^{7}
(Sweden) J Björkman	4	6^{4}
WC	(Russia) M Safin	2	1
2	(Australia) L Hewitt	6	6

Second round
5	(Italy) P Starace	3	0^{r}
Q	(United States) A Delić	6	3
Q	(Australia) C Guccione	2	5
4	(Argentina) G Cañas	6	7
8	(Germany) N Kiefer	3	1
(United States) S Querrey	6	6
(France) J Benneteau	6	7
2	(Australia) L Hewitt	3	5

Quarterfinals
Q	(United States) A Delić	4	4
4	(Argentina) G Cañas	6	6
(United States) S Querrey	7	6
(France) J Benneteau	5	2

Semifinals
4	(Argentina) G Cañas	5	2
(United States) S Querrey	7	6
