= 2004 Franklin Templeton Classic – Doubles =

Tennis tournament

Doubles
- 2004 Franklin Templeton Classic

Final
- Champions: (United States) Rick Leach (United States) Brian MacPhie
- Runners-up: (South Africa) Jeff Coetzee (South Africa) Chris Haggard
- Score: 6–3, 6–1

Details
- Draw: 16
- Seeds: 4

Events
| Singles | Doubles |
- Franklin Templeton Classic

James Blake and Mark Merklein were the defending champions but lost in the first round to Jeff Coetzee and Chris Haggard.

Rick Leach and Brian MacPhie won in the final 6–3, 6–1 against Coetzee and Haggard.

== Seeds ==
1. (Switzerland) Yves Allegro / (South Africa) Robbie Koenig (semifinals)
2. (United States) James Blake / (The Bahamas) Mark Merklein (first round)
3. (Australia) Jordan Kerr / (Australia) Todd Perry (first round)
4. (United States) Rick Leach / (United States) Brian MacPhie (champions)

== Draw ==
Key

- Q = Qualifier
- WC = Wild card
- LL = Lucky loser
- Alt = Alternate
- ITF = ITF entry
- PR = Protected ranking
- SR = Special ranking
- SE = Special exempt
- JE = Junior exempt
- JR = Junior Accelerator Programme entrant
- CO = College Accelerator Programme entrant
- NG = Next Gen Accelerator Program entrant
- w/o = Walkover
- r = Retired
- d = Defaulted

First round
1 | (Switzerland) Y Allegro (South Africa) R Koenig | 7^{7} | 6
(United States) R Ginepri (United States) R Kendrick | 6^{5} | 0
(Germany) L Burgsmüller (Croatia) I Karlović | 6 | 6
ALT | (United States) A Bogomolov Jr. (Argentina) M Vassallo Argüello | 0 | 3
4 | (United States) R Leach (United States) B MacPhie | 6 | 6
(United States) B Coupe (Japan) T Shimada | 4 | 1
(United States) J-M Gambill (United States) T Parrott | 6 | 5 | 1
WC | (Russia) D Tursunov (United States) B Vahaly | 3 | 7 | 6
(Croatia) M Ančić (France) A Dupuis | 6^{6} | 6 | 3
(United States) D Bowen (Australia) A Fisher | 7^{8} | 4 | 6
(Germany) N Kiefer (South Africa) W Moodie | 6 | 7^{9}
3 | (Australia) J Kerr (Australia) T Perry | 3 | 6^{7}
(Netherlands) J van Lottum (Netherlands) M Verkerk | 6 | 6
(United States) S Humphries (United States) V Spadea | 4 | 4
(South Africa) J Coetzee (South Africa) C Haggard | 6 | 6
2 | (United States) J Blake (The Bahamas) M Merklein | 3 | 3

Quarterfinals
1 | (Switzerland) Y Allegro (South Africa) R Koenig | 7^{8} | 6
(Germany) L Burgsmüller (Croatia) I Karlović | 6^{6} | 4
4 | (United States) R Leach (United States) B MacPhie | 7^{7} | 6
WC | (Russia) D Tursunov (United States) B Vahaly | 6^{5} | 3
(United States) D Bowen (Australia) A Fisher | 7 | 3 | 6^{7}
(Germany) N Kiefer (South Africa) W Moodie | 5 | 6 | 7^{9}
(Netherlands) J van Lottum (Netherlands) M Verkerk | 4 | 4
(South Africa) J Coetzee (South Africa) C Haggard | 6 | 6

Semifinals
1 | (Switzerland) Y Allegro (South Africa) R Koenig | 3 | 6^{4}
4 | (United States) R Leach (United States) B MacPhie | 6 | 7^{7}
(Germany) N Kiefer (South Africa) W Moodie
(South Africa) J Coetzee (South Africa) C Haggard | w/o

Final
4 | (United States) R Leach (United States) B MacPhie | 6 | 6
(South Africa) J Coetzee (South Africa) C Haggard | 3 | 1
