= 2001 Franklin Templeton Classic =

- Date: March 5–11
- Edition: 14th
- Category: International Series
- Draw: 32S / 16D
- Prize money: $375,000
- Surface: Hard / outdoor
- Location: Scottsdale, Arizona, U.S.

Champions

Singles
- (Spain) Francisco Clavet

Doubles
- (United States) Donald Johnson / (United States) Jared Palmer
← 2000 ·	Franklin Templeton Classic	· 2002 →

The 2001 Franklin Templeton Classic was a men's tennis tournament played on outdoor hard courts in Scottsdale, Arizona in the United States that was part of the International Series of the 2001 ATP Tour. It was the 14th edition of the tournament and was held from March 5 through March 11, 2001. Unseeded Francisco Clavet won the singles title.

== Finals ==
=== Singles ===
(Spain) Francisco Clavet defeated (Sweden) Magnus Norman 6–4, 6–2

- It was Clavet's only title of the year and the 8th of his career.

=== Doubles ===
(United States) Donald Johnson / (United States) Jared Palmer defeated (Chile) Marcelo Ríos / (Netherlands) Sjeng Schalken 7–6^{(7–3)}, 6–2

- It was Johnson's 2nd title of the year and the 16th of his career. It was Palmer's 1st title of the year and the 18th of his career.
