= 2004 Franklin Templeton Classic =

- Date: March 1–7
- Edition: 17th
- Category: International Series
- Draw: 32S / 16D
- Prize money: $355,000
- Surface: Hard / outdoor
- Location: Scottsdale, Arizona, U.S.

Champions

Singles
- (United States) Vince Spadea

Doubles
- (United States) Rick Leach / (United States) Brian MacPhie
← 2003 ·	Franklin Templeton Classic	· 2005 →

The 2004 Franklin Templeton Classic was a men's tennis tournament played on outdoor hard courts in Scottsdale, Arizona in the United States that was part of the International Series of the 2004 ATP Tour. It was the 17th edition of the tournament and was held from March 1 through March 7, 2004. Fourth-seeded Vince Spadea won the singles title.

== Finals ==
=== Singles ===
(United States) Vince Spadea defeated (Germany) Nicolas Kiefer 7–5, 6–7^{(5–7)}, 6–3

- It was Spadea's only singles title of his career.

=== Doubles ===
(United States) Rick Leach / (United States) Brian MacPhie defeated (South Africa) Jeff Coetzee / (South Africa) Chris Haggard 6–3, 6–1

- It was Leach's only title of the year and the 45th of his career. It was MacPhie's only title of the year and the 6th of his career.
