= 2002 Franklin Templeton Classic – Singles =

Tennis tournament

Singles
- 2002 Franklin Templeton Classic

Final
- Champion: (United States) Andre Agassi
- Runner-up: (Spain) Juan Balcells
- Score: 6–2, 7–6^{(7–2)}

Details
- Draw: 32
- Seeds: 8

Events
Singles	Doubles
← 2001 ·	Franklin Templeton Classic	· 2003 →

Francisco Clavet was the defending champion but lost in the first round to Andre Agassi.

Agassi won in the final 6–2, 7–6^{(7–2)} against Juan Balcells.

== Seeds ==
1. (United States) Andre Agassi (champion)
2. (Germany) Tommy Haas (first round)
3. (United States) Pete Sampras (second round)
4. (Argentina) Guillermo Cañas (first round)
5. (Spain) Àlex Corretja (second round)
6. (Spain) Albert Portas (second round)
7. (Belgium) Xavier Malisse (semifinals)
8. (Netherlands) Sjeng Schalken (first round)

== Draw ==
=== Key ===
- Q = Qualifier
- WC = Wild card
- LL = Lucky loser
- Alt = Alternate
- SE = Special exempt
- PR = Protected ranking
- ITF = ITF entry
- JE = Junior exempt
- w/o = Walkover
- r = Retired
- d = Defaulted
- SR = Special ranking

=== Finals ===
Semifinals
1	(United States) Andre Agassi	6	6
7	(Belgium) Xavier Malisse	4	4
(Spain) Juan Balcells	6	6
(Germany) Rainer Schüttler	3	1

Final
1	(United States) Andre Agassi	6	7^{7}
(Spain) Juan Balcells	2	6^{2}

=== Top half ===
First round
1	(United States) A Agassi	6	6
(Spain) F Clavet	3	2
(Argentina) F Squillari	6	1	5
(United Kingdom) G Rusedski	4	6	7
Q	(United States) R Ginepri	7	6^{6}	4
(Argentina) J I Chela	5	7^{8}	6
Q	(Germany) M Kohlmann	3	5
5	(Spain) À Corretja	6	7
3	(United States) P Sampras	6	6
Q	(Zimbabwe) B Black	1	2
(United States) C Mamiit	6	3	2
(South Africa) W Ferreira	2	6	6
(Italy) A Gaudenzi	7^{7}	6
WC	(United States) J Blake	6^{1}	3
Q	(United States) M Joyce	1	2
7	(Belgium) X Malisse	6	6

Second round
1	(United States) A Agassi	6	6
(United Kingdom) G Rusedski	4	4
(Argentina) J I Chela	6	7
5	(Spain) À Corretja	4	5
3	(United States) P Sampras	5	5
(South Africa) W Ferreira	7	7
(Italy) A Gaudenzi	5	6^{6}
7	(Belgium) X Malisse	7	7^{8}

Quarterfinals
1	(United States) A Agassi	7	6^{5}	6
(Argentina) J I Chela	5	7^{7}	1
(South Africa) W Ferreira	5	2
7	(Belgium) X Malisse	7	6

Semifinals
1	(United States) A Agassi	6	6
7	(Belgium) X Malisse	4	4

=== Bottom half ===
First round
6	(Spain) A Portas	6	7
(Brazil) F Saretta	3	5
(Israel) N Okun	7^{8}	6
(Brazil) F Meligeni	6^{6}	4
(Spain) J Balcells	7^{7}	6
(Spain) G Blanco	6^{3}	3
(Switzerland) M Kratochvil	6	3	6
4	(Argentina) G Cañas	3	6	3
8	(Netherlands) S Schalken	4	6	2
(Germany) R Schüttler	6	2	6
(United Kingdom) M Lee	2	7^{7}	5
(Spain) F Mantilla	6	6^{2}	7
(Argentina) M Zabaleta	7	3	4
(Spain) F Vicente	5	6	6
WC	(Spain) C Moyá	6	6^{2}	6
WC/2	(Germany) T Haas	2	7^{7}	3

Second round
6	(Spain) A Portas	6^{4}	4
(Israel) N Okun	7^{7}	6
(Spain) J Balcells	6	6
(Switzerland) M Kratochvil	3	4
(Germany) R Schüttler	6	2	6
(Spain) F Mantilla	0	6	1
(Spain) F Vicente	6	2	2
WC	(Spain) C Moyá	2	6	6

Quarterfinals
(Israel) N Okun	4	6	3
(Spain) J Balcells	6	4	6
(Germany) R Schüttler	6	3	6
WC	(Spain) C Moyá	3	6	2

Semifinals
(Spain) J Balcells	6	6
(Germany) R Schüttler	3	1
