= 2007 Mirage Cup =

The 2007 Mirage Cup was an ITF and USTA tennis tournament held in Las Vegas, Nevada, in the United States. The singles title was won by Caroline Wozniacki, and the doubles went to Victoria Azarenka and Tatiana Poutchek. The 2007 Tennis Channel Open was the men's version of the 2007 Mirage Cup, and was part of the 2007 ATP Tour. The tournament was worth $75,000 in prizes.

== Champions ==
=== Women's singles ===
(Denmark) Caroline Wozniacki defeated (Japan) Akiko Morigami 6–3, 6–2

=== Women's doubles ===
(Belarus) Victoria Azarenka / (Belarus) Tatiana Poutchek defeated (Estonia) Maret Ani / (Italy) Alberta Brianti 6–2, 6–4
