= 2001 Franklin Templeton Classic – Doubles =

Tennis tournament

Doubles
- 2001 Franklin Templeton Classic

Final
- Champions: (United States) Donald Johnson (United States) Jared Palmer
- Runners-up: (Chile) Marcelo Ríos (Netherlands) Sjeng Schalken
- Score: 7–6^{(7–3)}, 6–2

Details
- Draw: 16
- Seeds: 4

Events
Singles	Doubles
- Franklin Templeton Classic

Jared Palmer and Richey Reneberg were the defending champions but only Palmer competed that year with Donald Johnson.

Johnson and Palmer won in the final 7–6^{(7–3)}, 6–2 against Marcelo Ríos and Sjeng Schalken.

== Seeds ==
1. (United States) Donald Johnson / (United States) Jared Palmer (champions)
2. (South Africa) John-Laffnie de Jager / (South Africa) Ellis Ferreira (semifinals)
3. (Australia) Michael Hill / (United States) Jeff Tarango (first round)
4. (United States) Alex O'Brien / (United States) Jonathan Stark (quarterfinals)

== Draw ==
Key

- Q = Qualifier
- WC = Wild card
- LL = Lucky loser
- Alt = Alternate
- ITF = ITF entry
- PR = Protected ranking
- SR = Special ranking
- SE = Special exempt
- JE = Junior exempt
- JR = Junior Accelerator Programme entrant
- CO = College Accelerator Programme entrant
- NG = Next Gen Accelerator Program entrant
- w/o = Walkover
- r = Retired
- d = Defaulted

First round
1	(United States) D Johnson (United States) J Palmer	6	6
(United States) D Bowen (Israel) E Ran	3	3
(Australia) A Florent (Germany) R Schüttler	3	6	3
WC	(Sweden) T Enqvist (Sweden) M Norman	6	1	6
4	(United States) A O'Brien (United States) J Stark	7	5	6
Q	(Germany) L Burgsmüller (Federal Republic of Yugoslavia) D Vemić	5	7	2
(The Bahamas) M Knowles (United States) B MacPhie	3	2
(United States) B Bryan (United States) M Bryan	6	6
WC	(Chile) M Ríos (Netherlands) S Schalken	2	7^{7}	7
(Sweden) S Aspelin (Sweden) J Landsberg	6	6^{5}	5
WC	(United States) J Blake (United States) M Fish	4	6	6
3	(Australia) M Hill (United States) J Tarango	6	2	3
(Argentina) P Albano (Brazil) J Oncins	6^{4}	1
(Italy) A Gaudenzi (North Macedonia) A Kitinov	7^{7}	6
(Australia) D Macpherson (South Africa) G Stafford	0	6^{3}
2	(South Africa) J-L de Jager (South Africa) E Ferreira	6	7^{7}

Quarterfinals
1	(United States) D Johnson (United States) J Palmer	6	6
WC	(Sweden) T Enqvist (Sweden) M Norman	1	3
4	(United States) A O'Brien (United States) J Stark	3	6^{3}
(United States) B Bryan (United States) M Bryan	6	7^{7}
WC	(Chile) M Ríos (Netherlands) S Schalken	3	7^{7}	6
WC	(United States) J Blake (United States) M Fish	6	6^{2}	3
(Italy) A Gaudenzi (North Macedonia) A Kitinov	5	6	3
2	(South Africa) J-L de Jager (South Africa) E Ferreira	7	3	6

Semifinals
1	(United States) D Johnson (United States) J Palmer	6	6
(United States) B Bryan (United States) M Bryan	3	3
WC	(Chile) M Ríos (Netherlands) S Schalken	6	6
2	(South Africa) J-L de Jager (South Africa) E Ferreira	4	3

Final
1	(United States) D Johnson (United States) J Palmer	7^{7}	6
WC	(Chile) M Ríos (Netherlands) S Schalken	6^{3}	2
