= Jay Gooding =

Australian tennis coach and player

- Country (sports): Australia
- Born: 13 May 1976 (age 49) Melbourne, Victoria, Australia
- Height: 188 cm (6 ft 2 in)
- Prize money: $26,453

Singles
- Career record: 0–1 (ATP Tour)
- Highest ranking: No. 488 (13 Aug 2001)

Grand Slam singles results
- Australian Open: Q1 (2000)

Doubles
- Highest ranking: No. 400 (21 Apr 2003)

Jay Gooding (born 13 May 1976) is an Australian tennis coach and former professional player.

Gooding was born in Melbourne and raised on Queensland's Sunshine Coast. He attended Nambour State High School.

Turning professional in 1998, Gooding competed mostly in ITF satellite and Futures tournaments, with the occasional ATP Challenger appearance. He won five ITF Futures titles in doubles.

Gooding, who had a best singles world ranking of 488, made an ATP Tour main draw at the Franklin Templeton Classic in Scottsdale, where after coming through qualifying he lost in the first round to James Blake.

Based in the United States, Gooding now works as a coach and runs the Gooding Todero Academy, which he founded with Argentine Jorge Todero. Gooding previously had an academy in New York and as a USTA coach was involved in coaching Christina McHale and Melanie Oudin. As a personal coach he has toured with Louisa Chirico, helping her reach a career high ranking of 58. In 2020 he became head coach of the Orlando Storm in World TeamTennis.

== ITF Futures titles ==
=== Doubles: (5) ===
No.	Date	Tournament	Surface	Partner	Opponents	Score
1.	Sep 2000	Japan F6, Kashiwa	Hard	(Australia) David McNamara	(Japan) Tasuku Iwami (Japan) Mitsuru Takada	6–7^{(3)}, 6–4, 7–6^{(6)}
2.	Sep 2000	Japan F7, Chiba	Hard	(Australia) David McNamara	(Indonesia) Sulistyo Wibowo (Indonesia) Bonit Wiryawan	w/o
3.	Nov 2000	Australia F1, Melbourne	Hard	(Australia) David McNamara	(Australia) Paul Hanley (Australia) Jordan Kerr	6–2, 3–6, 6–4
4.	Aug 2001	Luxembourg F2, Luxembourg	Clay	(Germany) Sebastian Fitz	(Argentina) Roberto Álvarez (France) Jordane Doble	6–7^{(3)}, 6–3, 6–3
5.	Apr 2003	USA F8, Little Rock	Hard	(Australia) Jordan Kerr	(United States) Nick Crowell (United States) Luke Shields	6–3, 6–4
