= 2007 Tennis Channel Open – Singles =

Tennis tournament

Singles
- 2007 Tennis Channel Open and the Mirage Cup

Final
- Champion: (Australia) Lleyton Hewitt
- Runner-up: (Austria) Jürgen Melzer
- Score: 6–4, 7–6^{(12–10)}

Details
- Draw: 24
- Seeds: 8

Events
Singles	men	women
Doubles	men	women
- Tennis Channel Open Mirage Cup

James Blake was the defending champion, but was eliminated in the round robin competition.

Lleyton Hewitt won the title, defeating Jürgen Melzer 6–4, 7–6^{(12–10)} in the final.

== Seeds ==
1. (United States) James Blake (round robin)
2. (Australia) Lleyton Hewitt (champion)
3. (Russia) Marat Safin (semifinals)
4. (Austria) Jürgen Melzer (final)
5. (Spain) Fernando Verdasco (quarterfinals)
6. (France) Julien Benneteau (round robin)
7. (United Kingdom) Tim Henman (round robin)
8. (Germany) Benjamin Becker (round robin)

== Draw ==
Key

- Q = Qualifier
- WC = Wild card
- LL = Lucky loser
- Alt = Alternate
- ITF = ITF entry
- PR = Protected ranking
- SR = Special ranking
- SE = Special exempt
- JE = Junior exempt
- JR = Junior Accelerator Programme entrant
- CO = College Accelerator Programme entrant
- NG = Next Gen Accelerator Program entrant
- w/o = Walkover
- r = Retired
- d = Defaulted

=== Finals ===
Quarterfinals
(Russia) Evgeny Korolev	6	6
WC	(United States) Sam Querrey	4	4
(Czech Republic) Jan Hernych	3	6	3
4	(Austria) Jürgen Melzer	6	3	6
5	(Spain) Fernando Verdasco	1	4
3	(Russia) Marat Safin	6	6
(Spain) Feliciano López	3	2
2	(Australia) Lleyton Hewitt	6	6

Semifinals
(Russia) Evgeny Korolev	7^{7}	2	6^{4}
4	(Austria) Jürgen Melzer	6^{4}	6	7^{7}
3	(Russia) Marat Safin	5	1
2	(Australia) Lleyton Hewitt	7	6

Final
4	(Austria) Jürgen Melzer	4	6^{10}
2	(Australia) Lleyton Hewitt	6	7^{12}

=== Round robin ===
	Group 1	(United States) Blake	(Argentina) del Potro	(Russia) Korolev	RR W–L	Set W–L	Game W–L	Standings
1	(United States) James Blake		6–1, 3–1, ret.	2–6, 4–6	1–1	2–2 (50.0%)	15–14 (51.7%)	2
	(Argentina) Juan Martín del Potro	1–6, 1–3, ret.		6–3, 6–2	1–1	2–2 (50.0%)	14–14 (50.0%)	3
	(Russia) Evgeny Korolev	6–2, 6–4	3–6, 2–6		1–1	2–2 (50.0%)	17–18 (48.6%)	1

As del Potro retired on his last match, Korolev advanced to Quarterfinals based on head-to-head results against Blake.

	Group 2	(France) Benneteau	(United States) Goldstein	(United States) Querrey	RR W–L	Set W–L	Game W–L	Standings
6	(France) Julien Benneteau		1–6, 0–6	2–6, 6–7^{(3–7)}	0–2	0–4 (0.0%)	9–25 (26.5%)	3
	(United States) Paul Goldstein	6–1, 6–0		4–6, 6–1, 4–6	1–1	3–2 (60.0%)	26–14 (65.0%)	2
WC	(United States) Sam Querrey	6–2, 7–6^{(7–3)}	6–4, 1–6, 6–4		2–0	4–1 (80.0%)	26–22 (54.2%)	1

	Group 3	(Austria) Melzer	(France) Llodra	(Chile) Capdeville	RR W–L	Set W–L	Game W–L	Standings
4	(Austria) Jürgen Melzer		6–4, 2–6, 7–5	6–2, 6–2	2–0	4–1 (80.0%)	27–19 (58.7%)	1
	(France) Michaël Llodra	4–6, 6–2, 5–7		2–6, 6–2, 1–6	0–2	2–4 (33.3%)	24–29 (45.3%)	3
Q	(Chile) Paul Capdeville	2–6, 2–6	6–2, 2–6, 6–1		1–1	2–3 (40.0%)	18–21 (46.2%)	2

	Group 4	(Germany) Becker	(Czech Republic) Hernych	(Brazil) Kuerten	RR W–L	Set W–L	Game W–L	Standings
8	(Germany) Benjamin Becker		3–6, 5–7	6–4, 6–3	1–1	2–2 (50.0%)	20–20 (50.0%)	2
	(Czech Republic) Jan Hernych	6–3, 7–5		6–4, 6–4	2–0	4–0 (100%)	25–16 (61.0%)	1
WC	(Brazil) Gustavo Kuerten	4–6, 3–6	4–6, 4–6		0–2	0–4 (0.0%)	15–24 (38.5%)	3

	Group 5	(Spain) Verdasco	(France) Mathieu	(Thailand) Udomchoke	RR W–L	Set W–L	Game W–L	Standings
5	(Spain) Fernando Verdasco		3–6, 6–3, 7–5	6–1, 5–7, 6–2	2–0	4–2 (66.6%)	33–24 (57.9%)	1
	(France) Paul-Henri Mathieu	6–3, 3–6, 5–7		6–2, 6–3	1–1	3–2 (60.0%)	26–21 (55.3%)	2
Q	(Thailand) Danai Udomchoke	1–6, 7–5, 2–6	2–6, 3–6		0–2	1–4 (20.0%)	15–29 (34.1%)	3

	Group 6	(Russia) Safin	(Austria) Koubek	(Russia) Kunitsyn	RR W–L	Set W–L	Game W–L	Standings
3	(Russia) Marat Safin		7–5, 6–2	4–6, 7–6^{(7–4)}, 7–5	2–0	4–1 (80.0%)	31–24 (56.4%)	1
	(Austria) Stefan Koubek	5–7, 2–6		2–6, 2–6	0–2	0–4 (0.0%)	11–25 (30.6%)	3
	(Russia) Igor Kunitsyn	6–4, 6–7^{(4–7)}, 5–7	6–2, 6–2		1–1	3–2 (60.0%)	29–22 (56.9%)	2

	Group 7	(United Kingdom) Henman	(France) Mahut	(Spain) López	RR W–L	Set W–L	Game W–L	Standings
7/WC	(United Kingdom) Tim Henman		6–1, 6–2	7–6^{(7–1)}, 3–6, 4–6	1–1	3–2 (60.0%)	26–21 (55.3%)	2
	(France) Nicolas Mahut	1–6, 2–6		6–3, 3–6, 6–7^{(3–7)}	0–2	1–4 (20.0%)	18–28 (39.1%)	3
	(Spain) Feliciano López	6–7^{(1–7)}, 6–3, 6–4	3–6, 6–3, 7–6^{(7–3)}		2–0	4–2 (66.6%)	34–29 (54.0%)	1

	Group 8	(Australia) Hewitt	(United States) Spadea (Chinese Taipei) Lu	(Sweden) Johansson	RR W–L	Set W–L	Game W–L	Standings
2	(Australia) Lleyton Hewitt		6–3, 6–3 (w/ Spadea)	4–6, 7–5, 6–2	2–0	4–1 (80.0%)	29–19 (60.4%)	1
LL	(United States) Vincent Spadea (Chinese Taipei) Lu Yen-hsun	3–6, 3–6 (w/ Spadea)		0–6, 1–6 (w/ Lu)	0–1; 0–1	0–2 (0.0%); 0–2 (0.0%)	6–12 (33.3%); 1–12 (7.7%)	X 3
	(Sweden) Thomas Johansson	6–4, 5–7, 2–6	6–0, 6–1 (w/ Lu)		1–1	3–2 (60.0%)	25–18 (58.1%)	2

== Elimination round ==
Prior to the round robin and after the completion of the qualifying draws, the 16 players with the lowest tier in the tournament (4 qualifiers, 2 wild cards, 1 lucky loser and 9 based on ATP rankings) competed in the elimination round in order to get one of the 8 last spots into the round robin competition. Winners in this round entered as main entrants.

Main draw elimination round
Event	Winner	Loser	Score
Main Entrant 1	(Brazil) Gustavo Kuerten [WC]	(South Africa) Wesley Moodie [Q]	6–4, 7–5
Main Entrant 2	(Thailand) Danai Udomchoke [Q]	(United States) Robert Kendrick	6–4, 7–6^{(9–7)}
Main Entrant 3	(Russia) Igor Kunitsyn	(Canada) Frank Dancevic	6–1, 4–6, 6–3
Main Entrant 4	(Sweden) Thomas Johansson	(Germany) Björn Phau	4–6, 6–4, 6–1
Main Entrant 5	(Russia) Evgeny Korolev	(United States) Amer Delić	7–5, 4–6, 6–3
Main Entrant 6	(Chile) Paul Capdeville [Q]	(Chinese Taipei) Lu Yen-hsun ^{RR-LL}	6–3, 6–3
Main Entrant 7	(United States) Sam Querrey [WC]	(United Kingdom) Alex Bogdanovic [Q]	6–3, 6–2
Main Entrant 8	(Spain) Feliciano López	(Australia) Chris Guccione [LL]	6–4, 3–6, 7–6^{(8–6)}

^{RR-LL} :Lu entered the round robin competition as lucky loser.

== Qualifying ==
=== Seeds ===
1. (Thailand) Danai Udomchoke (qualified)
2. (Australia) Chris Guccione (qualifying competition, lucky loser)
3. (Serbia) Ilija Bozoljac (qualifying competition)
4. (Chile) Paul Capdeville (qualified)
5. (South Africa) Wesley Moodie (qualified)
6. (United States) Zack Fleishman (qualifying competition)
7. (Paraguay) Ramón Delgado (qualifying competition)
8. (United Kingdom) Alex Bogdanovic (qualified)

=== Qualifiers ===
1. (Thailand) Danai Udomchoke
2. (South Africa) Wesley Moodie
3. (United Kingdom) Alex Bogdanovic
4. (Chile) Paul Capdeville

=== Lucky loser ===
1. (Australia) Chris Guccione

=== Qualifying draw ===
==== First qualifier ====
First round
1	(Thailand) Danai Udomchoke	6	7
(Germany) Benedikt Dorsch	4	5
(Australia) Wayne Arthurs	5	6	2
7	(Paraguay) Ramón Delgado	7	3	6

Qualifying competition
1	(Thailand) Danai Udomchoke	6	6
7	(Paraguay) Ramón Delgado	2	0

==== Second qualifier ====
First round
2	(Australia) Chris Guccione	7^{7}	6
WC	(United States) Brian Wilson	6^{2}	4
WC	(United States) Ryan Sweeting	2	6^{5}
5	(South Africa) Wesley Moodie	6	7^{7}

Qualifying competition
2	(Australia) Chris Guccione	5	7	6^{4}
5	(South Africa) Wesley Moodie	7	5	7^{7}

==== Third qualifier ====
First round
3	(Serbia) Ilija Bozoljac	6	3	6
(United States) Alex Kuznetsov	4	6	1
(Philippines) Cecil Mamiit	0	1
8	(United Kingdom) Alex Bogdanovic	6	6

Qualifying competition
3	(Serbia) Ilija Bozoljac	1	3
8	(United Kingdom) Alex Bogdanovic	6	6

==== Fourth qualifier ====
First round
4	(Chile) Paul Capdeville	6	6
(United States) Bobby Reynolds	4	3
WC	(United States) Phillip King	0	5
6	(United States) Zack Fleishman	6	7

Qualifying competition
4	(Chile) Paul Capdeville	6	6
6	(United States) Zack Fleishman	4	3
