= 2001 Franklin Templeton Classic – Singles =

Tennis tournament

Singles
- 2001 Franklin Templeton Classic

Final
- Champion: (Spain) Francisco Clavet
- Runner-up: (Sweden) Magnus Norman
- Score: 6–4, 6–2

Details
- Draw: 32
- Seeds: 8

Events
Singles	Doubles
← 2000 ·	Franklin Templeton Classic	· 2002 →

Lleyton Hewitt was the defending champion but lost in the semifinals to Francisco Clavet.

Clavet won in the final 6–4, 6–2 against Magnus Norman.

== Seeds ==
1. (United States) Pete Sampras (first round)
2. (United States) Andre Agassi (first round)
3. (Sweden) Magnus Norman (final)
4. (Australia) Lleyton Hewitt (semifinals)
5. (Sweden) Thomas Enqvist (second round)
6. (United Kingdom) Tim Henman (quarterfinals)
7. (Chile) Marcelo Ríos (quarterfinals)
8. (Netherlands) Sjeng Schalken (first round)

== Draw ==
=== Key ===
- Q = Qualifier
- WC = Wild card
- LL = Lucky loser
- Alt = Alternate
- SE = Special exempt
- PR = Protected ranking
- ITF = ITF entry
- JE = Junior exempt
- w/o = Walkover
- r = Retired
- d = Defaulted
- SR = Special ranking

=== Finals ===
Semifinals
(Israel) Harel Levy	6^{3}	6^{8}
3	(Sweden) Magnus Norman	7^{7}	7^{10}
4	(Australia) Lleyton Hewitt	3	4
(Spain) Francisco Clavet	6	6

Final
3	(Sweden) Magnus Norman	4	2
(Spain) Francisco Clavet	6	6

=== Top half ===
First round
1	(United States) P Sampras	6	6^{2}	4
(Australia) A Ilie	3	7^{7}	6
(Israel) H Levy	6	7^{7}
Q	(Federal Republic of Yugoslavia) D Vemić	3	6^{2}
(Switzerland) M Kratochvil	6	6^{5}	2
(Spain) G Puentes	1	7^{7}	6
(Spain) A Costa	1	2
6	(United Kingdom) T Henman	6	6
3	(Sweden) M Norman	7^{7}	6
(Italy) G Pozzi	6^{3}	3
(South Korea) H-T Lee	4	6	6^{2}
WC	(Argentina) J Acasuso	6	1	7^{7}
(Argentina) J I Chela	6	2	3
WC	(United States) M Fish	4	6	6
(Morocco) Y El Aynaoui	6	3	2
5	(Sweden) T Enqvist	4	6	6

Second round
(Australia) A Ilie	7^{8}	1	2
(Israel) H Levy	6^{6}	6	6
(Spain) G Puentes	1	5
6	(United Kingdom) T Henman	6	7
3	(Sweden) M Norman	6	6
WC	(Argentina) J Acasuso	3	1
WC	(United States) M Fish	6	5	6
5	(Sweden) T Enqvist	2	7	4

Quarterfinals
(Israel) H Levy	6	6
6	(United Kingdom) T Henman	2	4
3	(Sweden) M Norman	6	3	6
WC	(United States) M Fish	3	6	3

Semifinals
(Israel) H Levy	6^{3}	6^{8}
3	(Sweden) M Norman	7^{7}	7^{10}

=== Bottom half ===
First round
7	(Chile) M Ríos	7^{7}	6
Q	(Romania) A Voinea	6^{4}	2
(Germany) R Schüttler	6	6
(France) A Di Pasquale	2	3
(Australia) R Fromberg	5	6	6
(Armenia) S Sargsian	7	3	4
(Spain) D Sánchez	1	3
4	(Australia) L Hewitt	6	6
8	(Netherlands) S Schalken	4	5
Q	(Italy) A Gaudenzi	6	7
WC	(United States) J Blake	4	4
(Chile) N Massú	6	6
Q	(United States) A O'Brien	7^{8}	2	2
SE	(Argentina) G Cañas	6^{6}	6	6
(Spain) F Clavet	6	6^{2}	7
2	(United States) A Agassi	1	7^{7}	5

Second round
7	(Chile) M Ríos	3	6	6
(Germany) R Schüttler	6	3	2
(Australia) R Fromberg	6	1	3
4	(Australia) L Hewitt	3	6	6
Q	(Italy) A Gaudenzi	1	6^{1}
(Chile) N Massú	6	7^{7}
SE	(Argentina) G Cañas	6^{5}	5
(Spain) F Clavet	7^{7}	7

Quarterfinals
7	(Chile) M Ríos	5	2
4	(Australia) L Hewitt	7	6
(Chile) N Massú	4	6	3
(Spain) F Clavet	6	2	6

Semifinals
4	(Australia) L Hewitt	3	4
(Spain) F Clavet	6	6
