= 2002 Franklin Templeton Classic – Doubles =

Tennis tournament

Doubles
- 2002 Franklin Templeton Classic

Final
- Champions: (United States) Bob Bryan (United States) Mike Bryan
- Runners-up: (The Bahamas) Mark Knowles (Canada) Daniel Nestor
- Score: 7–5, 7–6^{(8–6)}

Details
- Draw: 16
- Seeds: 4

Events
Singles	Doubles
- Franklin Templeton Classic

Donald Johnson and Jared Palmer were the defending champions but lost in the semifinals to Bob Bryan and Mike Bryan.

The Bryans won in the final 7–5, 7–6^{(8–6)} against Mark Knowles and Daniel Nestor.

== Seeds ==
1. (United States) Donald Johnson / (United States) Jared Palmer (semifinals)
2. (The Bahamas) Mark Knowles / (Canada) Daniel Nestor (final)
3. (South Africa) Ellis Ferreira / (United States) Rick Leach (quarterfinals)
4. (Australia) Joshua Eagle / (Australia) Sandon Stolle (first round)

== Draw ==
Key

- Q = Qualifier
- WC = Wild card
- LL = Lucky loser
- Alt = Alternate
- ITF = ITF entry
- PR = Protected ranking
- SR = Special ranking
- SE = Special exempt
- JE = Junior exempt
- JR = Junior Accelerator Programme entrant
- CO = College Accelerator Programme entrant
- NG = Next Gen Accelerator Program entrant
- w/o = Walkover
- r = Retired
- d = Defaulted

First round
1	(United States) D Johnson (United States) J Palmer	6	7^{7}
(Netherlands) S Schalken (United States) J Tarango	1	6^{5}
(Germany) K Braasch (Germany) M Kohlmann	7^{8}	2	[10]
WC	(Spain) À Corretja (Switzerland) M Kratochvil	6^{6}	6	[6]
3	(South Africa) E Ferreira (United States) R Leach	7	7
(Argentina) G Cañas (Germany) R Schüttler	5	5
(United States) B Bryan (United States) M Bryan	6	6
(Spain) F Mantilla (Spain) A Portas	1	4
WC	(United States) J Blake (United States) T Blake	6^{5}	6	[6]
(North Macedonia) A Kitinov (Sweden) J Landsberg	7^{7}	2	[10]
(Australia) A Florent (Australia) D Macpherson	7^{7}	4	[12]
4	(Australia) J Eagle (Australia) S Stolle	6^{4}	6	[10]
WC	(United States) R Ginepri (United States) C Mamiit	6	6^{5}	[4]
(Australia) P Hanley (Australia) N Healey	2	7^{7}	[10]
(Zimbabwe) W Black (Zimbabwe) K Ullyett	4	6	[8]
2	(The Bahamas) M Knowles (Canada) D Nestor	6	3	[10]

Quarterfinals
1	(United States) D Johnson (United States) J Palmer	6	6
(Germany) K Braasch (Germany) M Kohlmann	4	3
3	(South Africa) E Ferreira (United States) R Leach	6^{3}	3
(United States) B Bryan (United States) M Bryan	7^{7}	6
(North Macedonia) A Kitinov (Sweden) J Landsberg	6	6
(Australia) A Florent (Australia) D Macpherson	3	4
(Australia) P Hanley (Australia) N Healey	6^{5}	6^{2}
2	(The Bahamas) M Knowles (Canada) D Nestor	7^{7}	7^{7}

Semifinals
1	(United States) D Johnson (United States) J Palmer	5	6	[12]
(United States) B Bryan (United States) M Bryan	7	4	[14]
(North Macedonia) A Kitinov (Sweden) J Landsberg	4	2
2	(The Bahamas) M Knowles (Canada) D Nestor	6	6

Final
(United States) B Bryan (United States) M Bryan	7	7^{8}
2	(The Bahamas) M Knowles (Canada) D Nestor	5	6^{6}
