= 2006 Tennis Channel Open =

- Date: February 27 – March 6
- Edition: 19th
- Category: International Series
- Prize money: $355,000
- Surface: Hard / outdoor
- Location: Las Vegas, Nevada, United States
- Venue: Darling Tennis Center

Champions

Singles
- (United States) James Blake

Doubles
- (United States) Bob Bryan / (United States) Mike Bryan
← 2005 ·	Tennis Channel Open	· 2007 →

The 2006Tennis Channel Open was a men's tennis tournament played on outdoor hard courts in Las Vegas, Nevada in the United States that was part of the ATP International Series of the 2006 ATP Tour. It was the 19th edition of the tournament and was held from February 27 to March 6, 2006. Fifth-seeded James Blake won the singles title.

== Finals ==
=== Singles ===
(United States) James Blake defeated (Australia) Lleyton Hewitt 7–5, 2–6, 6–3

- It was Blake's 1st title of the year and the 9th of his career.

=== Doubles ===
(United States) Bob Bryan / (United States) Mike Bryan defeated (Czech Republic) Jaroslav Levinský / (Sweden) Robert Lindstedt 6–3, 6–2

- It was Bob Bryan's 2nd title of the year and the 28th of his career. It was Mike Bryan's 2nd title of the year and the 30th of his career.
