= 2002 Franklin Templeton Classic =

- Date: March 4–10
- Edition: 15th
- Category: International Series
- Draw: 32S / 16D
- Prize money: $375,000
- Surface: Hard / outdoor
- Location: Scottsdale, Arizona, U.S.

Champions

Singles
- (United States) Andre Agassi

Doubles
- (United States) Bob Bryan / (United States) Mike Bryan
← 2001 ·	Franklin Templeton Classic	· 2003 →

The 2002 Franklin Templeton Classic was a men's tennis tournament played on outdoor hard courts in Scottsdale, Arizona in the United States which was part of the International Series of the 2002 ATP Tour. It was the 15th edition of the tournament and was held from March 4 through March 10, 2002. First-seeded Andre Agassi won the singles title, his fourth at the event after 1993, 1994 and 1998.

== Finals ==
=== Singles ===
(United States) Andre Agassi defeated (Spain) Juan Balcells 6–2, 7–6^{(7–2)}

- It was Agassi's 1st title of the year and the 51st of his career.

=== Doubles ===
(United States) Bob Bryan / (United States) Mike Bryan defeated (The Bahamas) Mark Knowles / (Canada) Daniel Nestor 7–5, 7–6^{(8–6)}

- It was Bob Bryan's 2nd title of the year and the 6th of his career. It was Mike Bryan's 2nd title of the year and the 6th of his career.
