= 2006 Tennis Channel Open – Doubles =

Tennis tournament

Doubles
- 2006 Tennis Channel Open

Final
- Champions: (United States) Bob Bryan (United States) Mike Bryan
- Runners-up: (Czech Republic) Jaroslav Levinský (Sweden) Robert Lindstedt
- Score: 6–3, 6–2

Events
Singles	Doubles
← 2005 ·	Tennis Channel Open	· 2007 →

Bob Bryan and Mike Bryan were the defending champions. They successfully defended their title, defeating Jaroslav Levinský and Robert Lindstedt 6–3, 6–2 in the final.

== Seeds ==
1. (United States) Bob Bryan / (United States) Mike Bryan (champions)
2. (Sweden) Jonas Björkman / (Belarus) Max Mirnyi (quarterfinals)
3. (Sweden) Simon Aspelin / (Australia) Todd Perry (semifinals)
4. (Argentina) Gastón Etlis / (Australia) Stephen Huss (first round)

== Draw ==
=== Key ===
- Q = Qualifier
- WC = Wild card
- LL = Lucky loser
- Alt = Alternate
- ITF = ITF entry
- PR = Protected ranking
- SR = Special ranking
- SE = Special exempt
- JE = Junior exempt
- JR = Junior Accelerator Programme entrant
- CO = College Accelerator Programme entrant
- NG = Next Gen Accelerator Program entrant
- w/o = Walkover
- r = Retired
- d = Defaulted

=== Draw ===
First round
1	(United States) B Bryan (United States) M Bryan	6	6
(Australia) A Fisher (Germany) F Mayer	3	4
(Belgium) X Malisse (Belgium) K Vliegen	6^{4}	3
(South Africa) C Haggard (United States) J Thomas	7^{7}	6
4	(Argentina) G Etlis (Australia) S Huss	2	3
(Spain) T Robredo (Spain) F Verdasco	6	6
WC	(United States) J Blake (United States) T Blake	1	4
(South Africa) J Coetzee (Netherlands) R Wassen	6	6
(Australia) J Kerr (United States) T Parrott	7	6
(France) J Benneteau (France) G Monfils	5	2
(Germany) N Kiefer (Germany) M Kohlmann	6^{4}	2
3	(Sweden) S Aspelin (Australia) T Perry	7^{7}	6
(Italy) D Sanguinetti (Thailand) P Srichaphan	3	4
(Czech Republic) J Levinský (Sweden) R Lindstedt	6	6
WC	(United States) M Fish (United States) R Ginepri	1	2
2	(Sweden) J Björkman (Belarus) M Mirnyi	6	6

Quarterfinals
1	(United States) B Bryan (United States) M Bryan	6	6
(South Africa) C Haggard (United States) J Thomas	3	2
(Spain) T Robredo (Spain) F Verdasco	6^{2}	6	[1]
(South Africa) J Coetzee (Netherlands) R Wassen	7^{7}	3	[10]
(Australia) J Kerr (United States) T Parrott	5	6	[7]
3	(Sweden) S Aspelin (Australia) T Perry	7	3	[10]
(Czech Republic) J Levinský (Sweden) R Lindstedt	6	4	[13]
2	(Sweden) J Björkman (Belarus) M Mirnyi	3	6	[11]

Semifinals
1	(United States) B Bryan (United States) M Bryan	7^{8}	6
(South Africa) J Coetzee (Netherlands) R Wassen	6^{6}	4
3	(Sweden) S Aspelin (Australia) T Perry	5	4
(Czech Republic) J Levinský (Sweden) R Lindstedt	7	6

Final
1	(United States) B Bryan (United States) M Bryan	6	6
(Czech Republic) J Levinský (Sweden) R Lindstedt	3	2
