= 2008 Tennis Channel Open =

- Date: March 3–9
- Edition: 21st
- Category: International Series
- Draw: 32S / 16D
- Prize money: $411,000
- Surface: Hard / outdoor
- Location: Las Vegas, Nevada, US
- Venue: Darling Tennis Center

Champions

Singles
- (United States) Sam Querrey

Doubles
- (France) Julien Benneteau / (France) Michaël Llodra
← 2007 ·	Tennis Channel Open

The 2008 Tennis Channel Open was a men's tennis tournament played on outdoor hard courts. It was the 21st edition of the Tennis Channel Open, and was part of the International Series of the 2008 ATP Tour. It took place at The Amanda & Stacy Darling Memorial Tennis Center in Las Vegas, Nevada, United States, from March 3 through March 9, 2008.

The singles field featured Viña del Mar champion Fernando González, former World No. 1 and 2007 Cincinnati Masters semifinalist Lleyton Hewitt, and Marseille semifinalist Marcos Baghdatis. Other top seeds competing were 2007 Metz semifinalist Guillermo Cañas, Buenos Aires and Acapulco quarterfinalist Potito Starace, Michaël Llodra, Robin Söderling and Nicolas Kiefer.

Unseeded Sam Querrey won the singles title.

== Finals ==
=== Singles ===
(United States) Sam Querrey defeated (South Africa) Kevin Anderson, 4–6, 6–3, 6–4

- It was Querrey's first singles title of his career.

=== Doubles ===
(France) Julien Benneteau / (France) Michaël Llodra defeated (United States) Bob Bryan / (United States) Mike Bryan, 6–4, 4–6, [10–8]

== See also ==
- Las Vegas Challenger
