= 2005 Tennis Channel Open – Singles =

Tennis tournament

Singles
- 2005 Tennis Channel Open

Final
- Champion: (Australia) Wayne Arthurs
- Runner-up: (Croatia) Mario Ančić
- Score: 7–5, 6–3

Details
- Draw: 32
- Seeds: 8

Events
| Singles | Doubles |
| ← 2004 · | Tennis Channel Open | · 2006 → |

Vincent Spadea was the defending champion, but lost in the semifinals. Wayne Arthurs won the title, defeating Mario Ančić 7–5, 6–3 in the final.

== Seeds ==
1. (Germany) ~~Tommy Haas~~ (withdrew because of the flu)
2. (United States) Vincent Spadea (semifinals)
3. (Croatia) Mario Ančić (final)
4. (United States) Taylor Dent (first round)
5. (United States) Kevin Kim (second round)
6. (Georgia (country)) Irakli Labadze (second round)
7. (Denmark) Kenneth Carlsen (first round)
8. (Germany) Lars Burgsmüller (second round)

== Draw ==
=== Key ===
- Q = Qualifier
- WC = Wild card
- LL = Lucky loser
- Alt = Alternate
- SE = Special exempt
- PR = Protected ranking
- ITF = ITF entry
- JE = Junior exempt
- w/o = Walkover
- r = Retired
- d = Defaulted
- SR = Special ranking

=== Finals ===
Semifinals
(Belgium) Christophe Rochus | 5 | 6^{2}
(Australia) Wayne Arthurs | 7 | 7^{7}
3 | (Croatia) Mario Ančić | 6 | 6
2 | (United States) Vincent Spadea | 1 | 4

Final
(Australia) Wayne Arthurs | 7 | 6
3 | (Croatia) Mario Ančić | 5 | 3

=== Top half ===
First round
LL | (United States) P Goldstein | 6 | 6
WC | (United States) D Young | 3 | 1
Q | (Germany) M Kohlmann | 4 | 7^{7} | 3
(Italy) D Sanguinetti | 6 | 6^{2} | 6
(United States) J Morrison | 4 | 6 | 4
(Belgium) C Rochus | 6 | 2 | 6
Q | (Romania) H Tecău | 3 | 2
5 | (United States) K Kim | 6 | 6
4 | (United States) T Dent | 6 | 3 | 6^{4}
(Australia) W Arthurs | 3 | 6 | 7^{7}
(United States) J Gimelstob | 6 | 7^{7}
(Belgium) K Vliegen | 3 | 6^{3}
Q | (Canada) F Dancevic | 4 | 6^{4}
(United States) G Weiner | 6 | 7^{7}
(Taiwan) Y-H Lu | 6 | 4 | 6^{3}
8 | (Germany) L Burgsmüller | 4 | 6 | 7^{7}

Second round
LL | (United States) P Goldstein | 6 | 1 | 4
(Italy) D Sanguinetti | 3 | 6 | 6
(Belgium) C Rochus | 6 | 6
5 | (United States) K Kim | 3 | 1
(Australia) W Arthurs | 6 | 6^{5} | 7^{8}
(United States) J Gimelstob | 2 | 7^{7} | 6^{6}
(United States) G Weiner | 6 | 6
8 | (Germany) L Burgsmüller | 4 | 4

Quarterfinals
(Italy) D Sanguinetti | 4 | 3
(Belgium) C Rochus | 6 | 6
(Australia) W Arthurs | 6 | 7^{7}
(United States) G Weiner | 3 | 6^{3}

Semifinals
(Belgium) C Rochus | 5 | 6^{2}
(Australia) W Arthurs | 7 | 7^{7}

=== Bottom half ===
First round
6 | (Georgia (country)) I Labadze | 3 | 7 | 6
WC | (United States) A Kuznetsov | 6 | 5 | 1
(South Africa) W Moodie | 4 | 1
(Ecuador) G Lapentti | 6 | 6
(Germany) T Behrend | 5 | 6 | 4
(Australia) M Philippoussis | 7 | 1 | 6
WC | (United States) B Evans | 6 | 2 | 3
3 | (Croatia) M Ančić | 3 | 6 | 6
7 | (Denmark) K Carlsen | 6^{9} | 5
(United States) J Blake | 7^{11} | 7
(United States) A Bogomolov Jr. | 3 | 6^{4}
(United States) J Salzenstein | 6 | 7^{7}
(Serbia and Montenegro) J Tipsarević | 6 | 6
(United States) J-M Gambill | 4 | 2
Q | (United States) B Reynolds | 6 | 6^{4} | 6^{2}
2 | (United States) V Spadea | 1 | 7^{7} | 7^{7}

Second round
6 | (Georgia (country)) I Labadze | 2 | 2
(Ecuador) G Lapentti | 6 | 6
(Australia) M Philippoussis | 1 | 6^{3}
3 | (Croatia) M Ančić | 6 | 7^{7}
(United States) J Blake | 6 | 6
(United States) J Salzenstein | 2 | 4
(Serbia and Montenegro) J Tipsarević | 4 | 6 | 4
2 | (United States) V Spadea | 6 | 4 | 6

Quarterfinals
(Ecuador) G Lapentti | 1 | 4
3 | (Croatia) M Ančić | 6 | 6
(United States) J Blake | 6^{6} | 1
2 | (United States) V Spadea | 7^{8} | 6

Semifinals
3 | (Croatia) M Ančić | 6 | 6
2 | (United States) V Spadea | 1 | 4
