= 2005 Tennis Channel Open – Doubles =

Tennis tournament

Doubles
- 2005 Tennis Channel Open

Final
- Champions: (United States) Bob Bryan (United States) Mike Bryan
- Runners-up: (Australia) Wayne Arthurs (Australia) Paul Hanley
- Score: 7–5, 6–4

Events
Singles	Doubles
- Tennis Channel Open

Rick Leach and Brian MacPhie were the defending champions, but lost in the first round this year.

Bob Bryan and Mike Bryan won the title, defeating Wayne Arthurs and Paul Hanley 7–5, 6–4 in the final.

== Seeds ==
1. (United States) Bob Bryan / (United States) Mike Bryan (champions)
2. (Australia) Wayne Arthurs / (Australia) Paul Hanley (final)
3. (Switzerland) Yves Allegro / (Germany) Michael Kohlmann (quarterfinals)
4. (United States) Rick Leach / (United States) Brian MacPhie (first round)

== Draw ==
Key

- Q = Qualifier
- WC = Wild card
- LL = Lucky loser
- Alt = Alternate
- ITF = ITF entry
- PR = Protected ranking
- SR = Special ranking
- SE = Special exempt
- JE = Junior exempt
- JR = Junior Accelerator Programme entrant
- CO = College Accelerator Programme entrant
- NG = Next Gen Accelerator Program entrant
- w/o = Walkover
- r = Retired
- d = Defaulted

=== Draw ===
First round
1	(United States) B Bryan (United States) M Bryan	6	6
(United States) J-M Gambill (United States) J Gimelstob	3	2
(Chinese Taipei) Y-h Lu (United States) T Phillips	3	7	6
WC	(United States) R Ram (United States) B Reynolds	6	5	2
4	(United States) R Leach (United States) B MacPhie	6^{5}	7^{7}	2
(Australia) J Kerr (United States) J Thomas	7^{7}	6^{5}	6
(Georgia (country)) I Labadze (Belgium) T Vanhoudt	1	4
(Croatia) M Ančić (South Africa) J Coetzee	6	6
(Australia) A Fisher (South Africa) C Haggard	3	7^{7}	5
(United States) G Oliver (United States) T Parrott	6	6^{5}	7
WC	(United States) J Blake (United States) T Blake	6	1	6^{2}
3	(Switzerland) Y Allegro (Germany) M Kohlmann	2	6	7^{7}
(Czech Republic) T Cibulec (Czech Republic) J Levinský	4	6	6
(Germany) L Burgsmüller (Sweden) R Lindstedt	6	4	3
(United States) K Kim (United States) J Morrison	7^{12}	6^{3}	3
2	(Australia) W Arthurs (Australia) P Hanley	6^{10}	7^{7}	6

Quarterfinals
1	(United States) B Bryan (United States) M Bryan	w/o
(Chinese Taipei) Y-h Lu (United States) T Phillips
(Australia) J Kerr (United States) J Thomas	3	7	4
(Croatia) M Ančić (South Africa) J Coetzee	6	5	6
(United States) G Oliver (United States) T Parrott	6	6
3	(Switzerland) Y Allegro (Germany) M Kohlmann	3	4
(Czech Republic) T Cibulec (Czech Republic) J Levinský	3	3
2	(Australia) W Arthurs (Australia) P Hanley	6	6

Semifinals
1	(United States) B Bryan (United States) M Bryan	6	6
(Croatia) M Ančić (South Africa) J Coetzee	4	3
(United States) G Oliver (United States) T Parrott	3	7	4
2	(Australia) W Arthurs (Australia) P Hanley	6	5	6

Final
1	(United States) B Bryan (United States) M Bryan	7	6
2	(Australia) W Arthurs (Australia) P Hanley	5	4
