= 2008 Tennis Channel Open – Doubles =

Tennis tournament

Doubles
- 2008 Tennis Channel Open

Final
- Champions: (France) Julien Benneteau (France) Michaël Llodra
- Runners-up: (United States) Bob Bryan (United States) Mike Bryan
- Score: 6–4, 4–6, [10–8]

Events
Singles	Doubles
← 2007 ·	Tennis Channel Open

Bob Bryan and Mike Bryan were the defending champions, but Julien Benneteau and Michaël Llodra defeated them 6–4, 4–6, [10–8], in the final.

== Seeds ==
1. (United States) Bob Bryan / (United States) Mike Bryan (final)
2. (Sweden) Jonas Björkman / (Zimbabwe) Kevin Ullyett (semifinals)
3. (France) Julien Benneteau / (France) Michaël Llodra (champions)
4. (Brazil) Marcelo Melo / (Brazil) André Sá (quarterfinals)

== Draw ==
=== Key ===
- Q = Qualifier
- WC = Wild card
- LL = Lucky loser
- Alt = Alternate
- SE = Special exempt
- PR = Protected ranking
- ITF = ITF entry
- JE = Junior exempt
- w/o = Walkover
- r = Retired
- d = Defaulted
- SR = Special ranking

=== Draw ===
First round
1	(United States) B Bryan (United States) M Bryan	6	6
(Argentina) G Cañas (Argentina) S Roitman	2	1
WC	(Australia) C Guccione (Australia) L Hewitt	6	7^{7}
(United States) E Butorac (United States) J Thomas	4	6^{5}
4	(Brazil) M Melo (Brazil) A Sá	4	7^{7}	[10]
(United States) S Lipsky (United States) D Martin	6	6^{3}	[7]
WC	(Cyprus) M Baghdatis (Greece) K Economidis	6	6
(Belgium) X Malisse (Russia) M Safin	4	3
(Belarus) M Mirnyi (United Kingdom) J Murray	6	4	[12]
(Sweden) T Johansson (Sweden) R Lindstedt	4	6	[10]
(Germany) N Kiefer (Austria) J Melzer	7^{8}	4	[5]
3	(France) J Benneteau (France) M Llodra	6^{6}	6	[10]
(Australia) A Fisher (Italy) P Starace	3	6	[7]
(Argentina) L Arnold Ker (Chile) F González	6	3	[10]
(Czech Republic) F Čermák (Czech Republic) L Friedl	1	5
2	(Sweden) J Björkman (Zimbabwe) K Ullyett	6	7

Quarterfinals
1	(United States) B Bryan (United States) M Bryan	6	3	[10]
WC	(Australia) C Guccione (Australia) L Hewitt	3	6	[7]
4	(Brazil) M Melo (Brazil) A Sá	2	4
WC	(Cyprus) M Baghdatis (Greece) K Economidis	6	6
(Belarus) M Mirnyi (United Kingdom) J Murray	6^{8}	7^{7}	[6]
3	(France) J Benneteau (France) M Llodra	7^{10}	6^{2}	[10]
(Argentina) L Arnold Ker (Chile) F González	6^{1}	3
2	(Sweden) J Björkman (Zimbabwe) K Ullyett	7^{7}	6

Semifinals
1	(United States) B Bryan (United States) M Bryan	6	7
(Cyprus) M Baghdatis (Greece) K Economidis	2	5
3	(France) J Benneteau (France) M Llodra	7^{7}	6
2	(Sweden) J Björkman (Zimbabwe) K Ullyett	6^{5}	4

Final
1	(United States) B Bryan (United States) M Bryan	4	6	[8]
3	(France) J Benneteau (France) M Llodra	6	4	[10]
