= 2003 Franklin Templeton Classic =

- Date: March 3–9
- Edition: 16th
- Category: International Series
- Draw: 32S / 16D
- Prize money: $355,000
- Surface: Hard / outdoor
- Location: Scottsdale, Arizona, U.S.

Champions

Singles
- (Australia) Lleyton Hewitt

Doubles
- (United States) James Blake / (The Bahamas) Mark Merklein
← 2002 ·	Franklin Templeton Classic	· 2004 →

The 2003 Franklin Templeton Classic was a men's tennis tournament played on outdoor hard courts in Scottsdale, Arizona in the United States which was part of the International Series of the 2003 ATP Tour. It was the 16th edition of the tournament and was held from March 3 through March 9, 2003. First-seeded Lleyton Hewitt won the singles title.

== Finals ==
=== Singles ===
(Australia) Lleyton Hewitt defeated (Australia) Mark Philippoussis 6–4, 6–4

- It was Hewitt's 1st singles title of the year and the 18th of his career.

=== Doubles ===
(United States) James Blake / (The Bahamas) Mark Merklein defeated (Australia) Lleyton Hewitt / (Australia) Mark Philippoussis 6–4, 6–7^{(2–7)}, 7–6^{(7–5)}

- It was Blake's only title of the year and the 3rd of his career. It was Merklein's only title of the year and the 3rd of his career.
