= 2007 Tennis Channel Open and the Mirage Cup =

2007 Tennis Channel Open and Mirage Cup
- Date: 26 February – 4 March 2007
- Edition: 20th
- Prize money: $ 391,000 (ATP) $ 75,000 (ITF Women's)
- Location: Las Vegas, Nevada, United States
- Venue: Darling Tennis Center

Champions

Men's singles
- (Australia) Lleyton Hewitt

Women's singles
- (Denmark) Caroline Wozniacki

Men's doubles
- (United States) Bob Bryan / (United States) Mike Bryan

Women's doubles
- (Belarus) Victoria Azarenka / (Belarus) Tatiana Poutchek
← 2006 ·	Tennis Channel Open	· 2008 →
← 2006 ·	Mirage Cup	· 2008 →

The 2007 Tennis Channel Open was a tennis event on the 2007 ATP Tour. Lleyton Hewitt, who was the 2006 runner-up, was the singles champion, while Bob and Mike Bryan were the doubles champions. The event was held in Las Vegas, Nevada at the Darling Tennis Center. It was the twentieth Tennis Channel Open, but just the second to be held in Las Vegas. The ITF women's competition was won by Caroline Wozniacki in singles and by Victoria Azarenka and Tatiana Poutchek for doubles.

== Round robin decision ==
Since the 2007 Tennis Channel Open featured a round robin formatted draw, an issue arose. Defending champion James Blake, Evgeny Korolev, and Juan Martín del Potro were to play each other and the winner of the round robin who would advance to the quarterfinals was determined by the number of matches and percent of sets and games that were won. Blake lost to Korolev, and Korolev then lost to del Potro. For Blake to advance to the quarterfinals of the 2007 Tennis Channel Open, he had to defeat del Potro, losing no more than five games. In this situation, each player would have won one match each, and Blake would have lost the fewest games. In the del Potro versus Blake match, Blake, who was winning 6–1, 3–1, beat del Potro because he retired. This eliminated del Potro from such a three-way tie, because he did not complete all of his matches. Korolev then moved on to the next round, since del Potro had been eliminated, and Korolev had already beaten Blake.

This caused a controversial issue that involved fans, Blake, and others, as they felt that Blake was to be in the quarterfinals. A press conference was held, and the ATP, which was chaired by Etienne de Villiers, determined that Blake would have beaten del Potro and thus met the rules for advancement into the quarterfinals. Since neither player knew that del Potro's retirement would result in such a large issue, Blake would have won, and therefore, Blake went into the quarterfinals.

The following morning, however, De Villiers decided that the rules for advancement should not be altered after the tournament's start, and therefore Korolev was entered the quarterfinals. Blake entered the 2007 Indian Wells Masters without being able to defend three of his titles. Later, the round robin format was ended, and all tournaments planning on employing the round robin format were changed back into the original draw format.

== Finals ==
=== Men's singles ===
(Australia) Lleyton Hewitt defeated (Austria) Jürgen Melzer 6–4, 7–6^{(12–10)}

=== Women's singles ===
(Denmark) Caroline Wozniacki defeated (Japan) Akiko Morigami 6–3, 6–2

=== Men's doubles ===
(United States) Bob Bryan / (United States) Mike Bryan defeated (Israel) Jonathan Erlich / (Israel) Andy Ram 7–6^{(8–6)}, 6–2

=== Women's doubles ===
(Belarus) Victoria Azarenka / (Belarus) Tatiana Poutchek defeated (Estonia) Maret Ani / (Italy) Alberta Brianti 6–2, 6–4
