= Wayne Arthurs (tennis) =

Australian tennis player

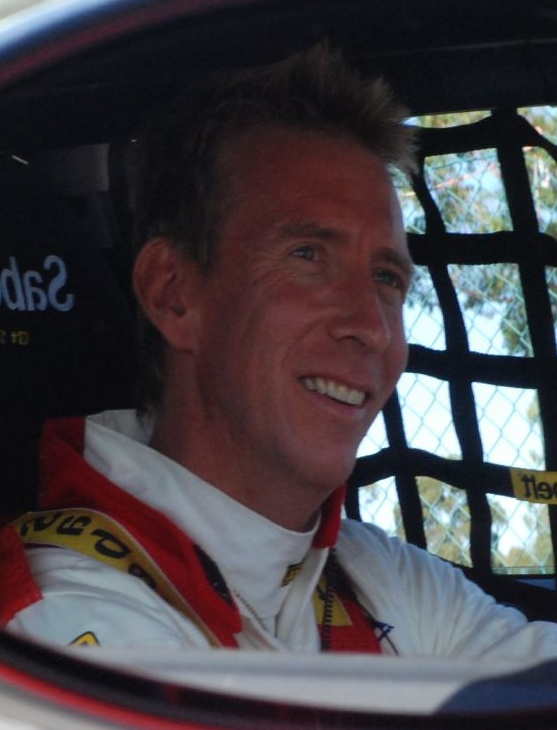
- Full name: Wayne Sean Arthurs
- Country (sports): Australia
- Residence: Melbourne, Australia
- Born: 18 March 1971 (age 55) Adelaide, Australia
- Height: 1.90 m (6 ft 3 in)
- Turned pro: 1990
- Retired: 2007
- Plays: Left-handed (one-handed backhand)
- Prize money: $3,687,809

Singles
- Career record: 133–159
- Career titles: 1
- Highest ranking: No. 44 (9 July 2001)

Grand Slam singles results
- Australian Open: 3R (2001, 2007)
- French Open: 4R (2001)
- Wimbledon: 4R (1999, 2002)
- US Open: 4R (2000)

Other tournaments
- Olympic Games: 2R (2004)

Doubles
- Career record: 313–253
- Career titles: 12
- Highest ranking: No. 11 (3 November 2003)

Grand Slam doubles results
- Australian Open: SF (2001)
- French Open: SF (2003)
- Wimbledon: SF (2004)
- US Open: QF (2003)

Other doubles tournaments
- Tour Finals: RR (2003, 2005)
- Olympic Games: 2R (2004)

Grand Slam mixed doubles results
- Australian Open: QF (2005)
- French Open: 1R (1995, 1996)
- Wimbledon: QF (1998)
- US Open: 1R (1995, 1999)
- Last updated on: 30 September 2021.

Wayne Arthurs OLY (born 18 March 1971) is a retired Australian professional tennis player.

== Career ==
His serve was his strongest weapon by far, and had been referred to as the "best in the world" by several of his fellow players, including Jim Courier, Andre Agassi, Juan Carlos Ferrero, Thomas Johansson, and Ivo Karlović. He consistently had one of the highest ace counts on the ATP Tour and favours a serve-and-volley style of play.

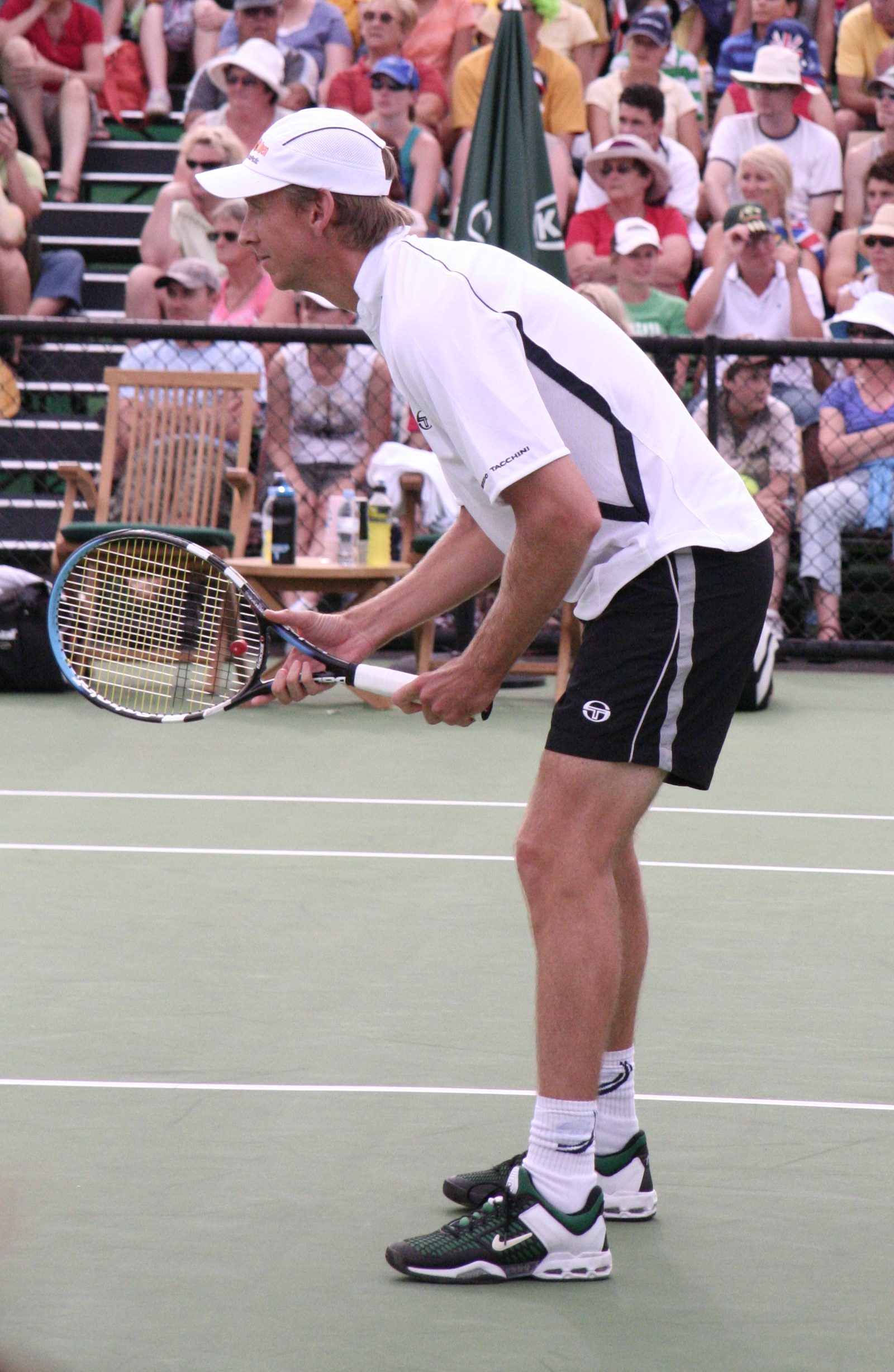
Arthurs at the 2007 Australian Open

Arthurs won 12 ATP doubles titles in his career. In February 2005 he achieved a belated breakthrough in singles by winning the ATP event in Scottsdale, United States, the Tennis Channel Open, in straight sets over Croat Mario Ančić. No other player in history had won his first ATP singles title at such an advanced age (Arthurs was almost 34 at the time). He also was a runner-up there for doubles with Paul Hanley, and lost to American team Bob and Mike Bryan. He is an Australian hero when it comes to Davis Cup, winning countless doubles rubbers for Australia. Throughout his singles career Arthurs experienced victory over no fewer than six players who have reached the number 1 world ranking: Pete Sampras, Marat Safin, Yevgeny Kafelnikov, Patrick Rafter, Andy Roddick and Gustavo Kuerten. He also beat Stefan Edberg (another former number 1) in a money tournament in England on Grass – at the time, Arthurs' singles ranking was 1100 and Edberg's was 2, making for one of the biggest differences in ranking between winner and loser on the Tour that year.

In his last ever Australian Open match the Aussie retired just three games into his third-round match against American Mardy Fish due to a rare reaction to a local anaesthetic. In practice that morning he tried out a short-term local anaesthetic that worked well against his sore hip. Just before the match began, he took another shot that was supposed to last for the duration of the match. The stronger dose deadened his leg and he could not co-ordinate his movements. He refused to blame his doctors who said that this adverse reaction happens to about 1 in 1000 patients. Arthurs became emotional during the match once he realised he couldn't compete. After the in-between-game break, down 3–0 he waved to the crowd who thanked him for an outstanding career. It was the last Australian Open match of his career. At the time, he was the oldest participant in the Australian Open.

Arthurs played his final tournament at Wimbledon in 2007. He won qualifying matches to advance to the main draw of the major tournament. In the first round he came back from two sets down to finally win in five sets against Dutch teenager Thiemo de Bakker. In the second round Arthurs caused a major boilover by defeating the 11th-seeded Spaniard Tommy Robredo in straight sets. Arthurs was defeated in the third round by 19th seed Jonas Björkman in straight sets.

Following his retirement, Arthurs coached Queensland player Oliver Anderson.

In January 2019 Arthurs received the OLY post-nominal title at the Brisbane International tournament.

On 30 August 2000, Arthurs was awarded the Australian Sports Medal for his strong commitment to tennis.

== ATP career finals ==
=== Singles: 2 (1 title, 1 runner-up) ===
Legend Grand Slam tournaments (0–0) ATP World Tour Finals (0–0) ATP World Tour Masters 1000 (0–0) ATP World Tour 500 Series (0–0) ATP World Tour 250 Series (1–1)	Titles by surface Hard (1–0) Clay (0–0) Grass (0–1) Carpet (0–0)	Titles by setting Outdoor (1–1) Indoor (0–0)

Result	W–L	Date	Tournament	Tier	Surface	Opponent	Score
Loss	0–1	Jun 2002	Nottingham, United Kingdom	International Series	Grass	(Sweden) Jonas Björkman	2–6, 7–6^{(7–5)}, 2–6
Win	1–1	Feb 2005	Scottsdale, United States	International Series	Hard	(Croatia) Mario Ančić	7–5, 6–3

=== Doubles: 27 (12 titles, 15 runner-ups) ===
Legend Grand Slam tournaments (0–0) ATP World Tour Finals (0–0) ATP World Tour Masters 1000 (3–4) ATP World Tour 500 Series (2–0) ATP World Tour 250 Series (7–11)	Titles by surface Hard (5–9) Clay (5–5) Grass (1–0) Carpet (1–1)	Titles by setting Outdoor (8–11) Indoor (4–4)

Result	W–L	Date	Tournament	Tier	Surface	Partner	Opponents	Score
Win	1–0	Sep 1994	Bucharest, Romania	World Series	Clay	(Australia) Simon Youl	(Spain) Jordi Arrese (Spain) José Antonio Conde	6–4, 6–4
Loss	1–1	Jul 1995	Amsterdam, Netherlands	World Series	Clay	(United Kingdom) Neil Broad	(Chile) Marcelo Ríos (Netherlands) Sjeng Schalken	6–7, 2–6
Loss	1–2	Aug 1995	Kitzbühel, Austria	World Series	Clay	(Spain) Jordi Arrese	(United States) Francisco Montana (United States) Greg Van Emburgh	7–6, 3–6, 6–7
Loss	1–3	Mar 1996	Copenhagen, Denmark	World Series	Carpet	(Australia) Andrew Kratzmann	(Czechoslovakia) Libor Pimek (South Africa) Byron Talbot	6–7, 6–3, 3–6
Win	2–3	Jul 1997	Kitzbühel, Austria	World Series	Clay	(Australia) Richard Fromberg	(Austria) Thomas Buchmayer (Austria) Thomas Strengberger	6–4, 6–3
Win	3–3	May 1998	Prague, Czech Republic	World Series	Clay	(Australia) Andrew Kratzmann	(Sweden) Fredrik Bergh (Sweden) Nicklas Kulti	6–1, 6–1
Win	4–3	Aug 1998	New Haven, United States	Championship Series	Hard	(Australia) Peter Tramacchi	(Canada) Sébastien Lareau (United States) Alex O'Brien	7–6, 1–6, 6–3
Loss	4–4	Sep 1998	Bournemouth, United Kingdom	World Series	Clay	(Spain) Alberto Berasategui	(United Kingdom) Neil Broad (South Africa) Kevin Ullyett	6–7, 3–6
Win	5–4	May 1999	Hamburg, Germany	Masters Series	Clay	(Australia) Andrew Kratzmann	(Netherlands) Paul Haarhuis (United States) Jared Palmer	2–6, 7–6^{(7–5)}, 6–2
Win	6–4	Jul 1999	Newport, United States	World Series	Grass	(India) Leander Paes	(Armenia) Sargis Sargsian (United States) Chris Woodruff	6–7^{(6–8)}, 7–6^{(9–7)}, 6–3
Loss	6–5	May 2000	Hamburg, Germany	Masters Series	Clay	(Australia) Sandon Stolle	(Australia) Todd Woodbridge (Australia) Mark Woodforde	7–6^{(7–4)}, 4–6, 3–6
Loss	6–6	Jan 2001	Adelaide, Australia	World Series	Hard	(Australia) Todd Woodbridge	(Australia) David Macpherson (South Africa) Grant Stafford	7–6^{(7–5)}, 4–6, 4–6
Loss	6–7	Sep 2002	Hong Kong, Hong Kong	World Series	Hard	(Australia) Andrew Kratzmann	(United States) Jan-Michael Gambill (United States) Graydon Oliver	7–6^{(7–2)}, 4–6, 6–7^{(4–7)}
Loss	6–8	Oct 2002	Stockholm, Sweden	World Series	Hard	(Australia) Paul Hanley	(Zimbabwe) Wayne Black (Zimbabwe) Kevin Ullyett	4–6, 6–2, 6–7^{(4–7)}
Win	7–8	Feb 2003	Rotterdam, Netherlands	Championship Series	Hard	(Australia) Paul Hanley	(Switzerland) Roger Federer (Belarus) Max Mirnyi	7–6^{(7–4)}, 6–2
Win	8–8	May 2003	Rome, Italy	Masters Series	Clay	(Australia) Paul Hanley	(France) Michaël Llodra (France) Fabrice Santoro	6–1, 6–3
Loss	8–9	Aug 2003	Cincinnati, United States	Masters Series	Hard	(Australia) Paul Hanley	(United States) Bob Bryan (United States) Mike Bryan	5–7, 6–7^{(5–7)}
Win	9–9	Sep 2003	Shanghai, China	World Series	Hard	(Australia) Paul Hanley	(China) Zeng Shaoxuan (China) Zhu Benqiang	6–2, 6–4
Loss	9–10	Oct 2003	Stockholm, Sweden	World Series	Hard	(Australia) Paul Hanley	(Sweden) Jonas Björkman (Australia) Todd Woodbridge	3–6, 4–6
Win	10–10	Nov 2003	Paris, France	Masters Series	Carpet	(Australia) Paul Hanley	(France) Michaël Llodra (France) Fabrice Santoro	6–3, 1–6, 6–3
Loss	10–11	May 2004	Rome, Italy	Masters Series	Clay	(Australia) Paul Hanley	(India) Mahesh Bhupathi (Belarus) Max Mirnyi	6–2, 3–6, 4–6
Loss	10–12	Jul 2004	Los Angeles, United States	World Series	Hard	(Australia) Paul Hanley	(United States) Bob Bryan (United States) Mike Bryan	3–6, 6–7^{(4–7)}
Loss	10–13	Oct 2004	Stockholm, Sweden	World Series	Hard	(Australia) Paul Hanley	(Spain) Feliciano López (Spain) Fernando Verdasco	4–6, 4–6
Win	11–13	Feb 2005	San Jose, United States	International Series	Hard	(Australia) Paul Hanley	(Switzerland) Yves Allegro (Germany) Michael Kohlmann	7–6^{(7–4)}, 6–4
Loss	11–14	Feb 2005	Scottsdale, United States	International Series	Hard	(Australia) Paul Hanley	(United States) Bob Bryan (United States) Mike Bryan	5–7, 4–6
Loss	11–15	Mar 2005	Indian Wells, United States	Masters Series	Hard	(Australia) Paul Hanley	(Canada) Daniel Nestor (The Bahamas) Mark Knowles	6–7^{(6–8)}, 6–7^{(2–7)}
Win	12–15	Oct 2005	Stockholm, Sweden	World Series	Hard	(Australia) Paul Hanley	(India) Leander Paes (Serbia and Montenegro) Nenad Zimonjić	5–3, 5–3

== ATP Challenger and ITF Futures finals ==
=== Singles: 3 (3–0) ===
Legend ATP Challenger (3–0) ITF Futures (0–0)	Finals by surface Hard (2–0) Clay (0–0) Grass (1–0) Carpet (0–0)

Result	W–L	Date	Tournament	Tier	Surface	Opponent	Score
Win	1–0	Dec 1997	Perth, Australia	Challenger	Hard	(Australia) Todd Larkham	7–5, 7–6
Win	2–0	Jun 2000	Surbiton, United Kingdom	Challenger	Grass	(Italy) Laurence Tieleman	4–6, 7–6^{(8–6)}, 6–4
Win	3–0	Aug 2000	Wrexham, United Kingdom	Challenger	Hard	(Slovakia) Ladislav Švarc	6–2, 6–4

=== Doubles: 15 (3–12) ===
Legend ATP Challenger (3–12) ITF Futures (0–0)	Finals by surface Hard (2–3) Clay (1–3) Grass (0–4) Carpet (0–2)

Result	W–L	Date	Tournament	Tier	Surface	Partner	Opponents	Score
Loss	0–1	Aug 1991	Salou, Spain	Challenger	Clay	(Australia) Carl Limberger	(United States) Murphy Jensen (United States) Francisco Montana	7–5, 2–6, 5–7
Win	1–1	Aug 1993	Winnetka, United States	Challenger	Hard	(United Kingdom) Mark Petchey	(Australia) Patrick Rafter (Australia) Sandon Stolle	7–6, 6–7, 6–4
Loss	1–2	Aug 1993	Cincinnati, United States	Challenger	Hard	(India) Leander Paes	(South Africa) Johan de Beer (South Africa) Kevin Ullyett	6–7, 4–6
Loss	1–3	Aug 1993	Bronx, United States	Challenger	Hard	(Australia) Grant Doyle	(South Africa) Johan de Beer (South Africa) Kevin Ullyett	6–7, 6–7
Loss	1–4	Feb 1994	Wolfsburg, Germany	Challenger	Carpet	(Australia) Simon Youl	(United States) Rich Benson (Malaysia) Adam Malik	6–7, 4–6
Loss	1–5	Aug 1994	Graz, Austria	Challenger	Clay	(Australia) Simon Youl	(Netherlands) Hendrik Jan Davids (Netherlands) Stephen Noteboom	6–4, 3–6, 6–7
Loss	1–6	Nov 1994	Aachen, Germany	Challenger	Carpet	(Australia) Brent Larkham	(Sweden) David Engel (Sweden) Ola Kristiansson	4–6, 4–6
Loss	1–7	Dec 1994	Perth, Australia	Challenger	Grass	(Australia) Neil Borwick	(Australia) Ben Ellwood (Australia) Mark Philippoussis	5–7, 6–7
Loss	1–8	Dec 1995	Perth, Australia	Challenger	Hard	(Australia) Andrew Kratzmann	(Australia) Joshua Eagle (Australia) Andrew Florent	4–6, 4–6
Win	2–8	Sep 1997	Edinburgh, United Kingdom	Challenger	Clay	(Australia) Grant Doyle	(South Africa) Chris Haggard (Australia) James Holmes	4–6, 6–2, 6–2
Loss	2–9	Oct 1997	Cairo, Egypt	Challenger	Clay	(Israel) Eyal Ran	(Spain) Tomás Carbonell (Spain) Francisco Roig	3–6, 3–6
Loss	2–10	Jul 1998	Bristol, United Kingdom	Challenger	Grass	(Australia) Ben Ellwood	(Belarus) Max Mirnyi (Belarus) Vladimir Voltchkov	4–6, 6–3, 6–7
Loss	2–11	Jul 1998	Manchester, United Kingdom	Challenger	Grass	(Australia) Ben Ellwood	(Italy) Mosé Navarra (Italy) Stefano Pescosolido	1–6, 7–6, 6–7
Win	3–11	Nov 1998	Rancho Mirage, United States	Challenger	Hard	(Australia) Peter Tramacchi	(Australia) Todd Larkham (Australia) Grant Silcock	6–3, 3–6, 6–3
Loss	3–12	Jun 2006	Surbiton, United Kingdom	Challenger	Grass	(Australia) Chris Guccione	(Australia) Jordan Kerr (United States) Jim Thomas	2–6, 4–6

== Performance timelines ==
Key
W	F	SF	QF	#R	RR	Q#	DNQ	A	NH

(W) winner; (F) finalist; (SF) semifinalist; (QF) quarterfinalist; (#R) rounds 4, 3, 2, 1; (RR) round-robin stage; (Q#) qualification round; (DNQ) did not qualify; (A) absent; (NH) not held; (SR) strike rate (events won / competed); (W–L) win–loss record.

=== Singles ===
Tournament	1990	1991	1992	1993	1994	1995	1996	1997	1998	1999	2000	2001	2002	2003	2004	2005	2006	2007	SR	W–L	Win %
Grand Slam tournaments
Australian Open	Q1	Q2	Q1	Q1	Q1	Q2	Q3	A	Q3	1R	1R	3R	1R	2R	2R	1R	1R	3R	0 / 9	6–9	40%
French Open	A	A	A	Q1	Q2	A	A	A	A	Q1	1R	4R	2R	1R	1R	1R	1R	Q1	0 / 7	4–7	36%
Wimbledon	A	A	A	Q1	Q1	A	Q2	A	Q1	4R	1R	1R	4R	2R	1R	2R	1R	3R	0 / 9	10–9	53%
US Open	A	A	Q1	Q1	A	A	A	A	2R	2R	4R	1R	1R	1R	1R	1R	Q2	A	0 / 8	5–8	38%
Win–loss	0–0	0–0	0–0	0–0	0–0	0–0	0–0	0–0	1–1	4–3	3–4	5–4	4–4	2–4	1–4	1–4	0–3	4–2	0 / 33	25–33	43%
Olympic Games
Summer Olympics	Not Held		A	Not Held			A	Not Held			A	Not Held			2R	Not Held			0 / 1	1–1	50%
ATP Tour Masters 1000
Indian Wells Masters	A	A	A	A	A	A	A	A	A	A	A	A	1R	1R	4R	2R	A	A	0 / 4	4–4	50%
Miami Open	A	A	A	A	A	A	A	A	A	A	2R	2R	Q1	1R	A	A	A	A	0 / 3	2–3	40%
Monte Carlo	A	A	A	A	A	A	A	A	A	A	Q1	A	A	1R	3R	1R	A	A	0 / 3	2–3	40%
Rome	A	A	A	A	A	A	A	A	A	A	A	Q2	A	1R	1R	Q1	A	A	0 / 2	0–2	0%
Hamburg	A	A	A	A	A	Q2	A	A	A	A	Q1	Q1	1R	1R	A	A	A	A	0 / 2	0–2	0%
Canada Masters	A	A	A	A	A	A	A	A	A	A	A	1R	A	Q1	A	Q1	Q2	A	0 / 1	0–1	0%
Cincinnati Masters	A	A	A	Q1	A	A	A	A	A	1R	A	1R	QF	1R	3R	Q1	Q1	A	0 / 5	5–5	50%
Paris Masters	A	A	A	A	A	A	A	A	A	Q1	Q1	A	A	A	A	A	A	A	0 / 0	0–0	–
Stuttgart	A	A	A	A	A	Q1	A	A	A	Q2	Q1	A	Not Held						0 / 0	0–0	–
Win–loss	0–0	0–0	0–0	0–0	0–0	0–0	0–0	0–0	0–0	0–1	1–1	1–3	3–3	0–6	7–4	1–2	0–0	0–0	0 / 20	13–20	39%

=== Doubles ===
Tournament	1990	1991	1992	1993	1994	1995	1996	1997	1998	1999	2000	2001	2002	2003	2004	2005	2006	2007	SR	W–L	Win %
Grand Slam tournaments
Australian Open	A	1R	1R	1R	A	1R	1R	2R	2R	2R	1R	SF	2R	1R	2R	2R	1R	1R	0 / 16	10–16	38%
French Open	A	A	A	A	A	1R	2R	2R	1R	QF	1R	1R	QF	SF	1R	QF	1R	2R	0 / 13	16–13	55%
Wimbledon	Q1	Q2	Q2	Q2	1R	1R	1R	1R	2R	2R	3R	2R	1R	QF	SF	1R	2R	2R	0 / 14	14–14	50%
US Open	A	A	A	A	A	1R	A	1R	A	3R	3R	3R	3R	QF	1R	3R	2R	A	0 / 10	14–10	58%
Win–loss	0–0	0–1	0–1	0–1	0–1	0–4	1–3	2–4	2–3	7–4	4–4	7–4	6–4	10–4	5–4	6–4	2–4	2–3	0 / 53	54–53	50%
Olympic Games
Summer Olympics	Not Held		A	Not Held			A	Not Held			A	Not Held			2R	Not Held			0 / 1	1–1	50%
ATP Tour Masters 1000
Indian Wells Masters	A	A	A	A	A	A	A	A	A	A	2R	2R	A	2R	QF	F	A	A	0 / 5	9–5	64%
Miami Open	A	A	A	A	A	A	A	A	A	A	1R	QF	A	A	A	1R	A	A	0 / 3	2–3	40%
Monte Carlo	A	A	A	A	A	Q1	A	A	A	SF	1R	A	A	QF	A	SF	A	A	0 / 4	7–4	64%
Rome	A	A	A	A	A	2R	1R	A	A	A	A	1R	A	W	F	2R	A	A	1 / 6	9–5	64%
Madrid	Not Held												A	A	Q4	QF	A	A	0 / 2	2–2	50%
Hamburg	A	A	A	A	A	SF	1R	A	A	W	F	2R	2R	QF	QF	QF	A	A	1 / 9	16–8	67%
Canada Masters	A	A	A	A	A	A	A	A	A	A	A	QF	A	QF	2R	QF	QF	A	0 / 5	6–5	55%
Cincinnati Masters	A	A	A	Q1	A	A	A	A	A	1R	A	2R	1R	F	2R	2R	2R	A	0 / 7	5–7	42%
Paris Masters	A	A	A	A	A	A	A	A	A	QF	QF	A	A	W	1R	QF	A	A	1 / 5	9–4	69%
Stuttgart	A	A	A	A	A	2R	A	A	A	QF	SF	QF	Not Held						0 / 4	8–4	67%
Win–loss	0–0	0–0	0–0	0–0	0–0	5–3	0–2	0–0	0–0	12–4	9–6	9–7	1–2	17–5	7–7	10–9	3–2	0–0	3 / 50	73–47	61%

=== Mixed doubles ===
Tournament	1991	1992	1993	1994	1995	1996	1997	1998	1999	2000	2001	2002	2003	2004	2005	2006	SR	W–L	Win %
Grand Slam tournaments
Australian Open	A	A	A	A	A	A	A	2R	1R	1R	2R	A	A	A	QF	2R	0 / 6	5–6	45%
French Open	A	A	A	A	1R	1R	A	A	A	A	A	A	A	A	A	A	0 / 2	0–2	0%
Wimbledon	Q1	A	A	A	2R	1R	3R	QF	1R	2R	A	A	A	2R	A	1R	0 / 8	8–8	0%
US Open	A	A	A	A	1R	A	A	A	1R	A	A	A	A	A	A	A	0 / 2	0–2	0%
Win–loss	0–0	0–0	0–0	0–0	1–3	0–2	2–1	4–2	0–3	1–2	1–1	0–0	0–0	1–1	2–1	1–2	0 / 18	13–18	42%

== Personal life ==
Arthurs is the son of Ireland Davis Cup player Derek Arthurs. He is a supporter of the North Melbourne Football Club.
