= 1991 Australian Indoor Championships – Doubles =

Doubles
- 1991 Australian Indoor Championships

Final
- Champions: (United States) Jim Grabb (United States) Richey Reneberg
- Runners-up: (United States) Luke Jensen (Australia) Laurie Warder
- Score: 6–4, 6–4

Details
- Draw: 24
- Seeds: 8

Events
Singles	Doubles
← 1990 ·	Australian Indoor Championships	· 1992 →

Broderick Dyke and Peter Lundgren were the defending champions of the doubles event at the Australian Indoor Championships men's tennis tournament. Still, they lost in the quarterfinals to Luke Jensen and Laurie Warder.

Jim Grabb and Richey Reneberg won in the final 6–4, 6–4 against Jensen and Warder.

== Seeds ==
All eight seeded teams received byes to the second round.

1. (United States) Scott Davis / (United States) David Pate (semifinals)
2. (Canada) Grant Connell / (Canada) Glenn Michibata (second round)
3. (Australia) Todd Woodbridge / (Australia) Mark Woodforde (second round)
4. (Croatia) Goran Ivanišević / (South Africa) Gary Muller (quarterfinals)
5. (United States) Luke Jensen / (Australia) Laurie Warder (final)
6. (South Africa) Wayne Ferreira / (South Africa) Piet Norval (quarterfinals)
7. (Australia) Mark Kratzmann / (Australia) Wally Masur (quarterfinals)
8. (Sweden) Stefan Edberg / (Australia) John Fitzgerald (quarterfinals)

== Draw ==
=== Key ===
- Q = Qualifier
- WC = Wild card
- LL = Lucky loser
- Alt = Alternate
- SE = Special exempt
- PR = Protected ranking
- ITF = ITF entry
- JE = Junior exempt
- w/o = Walkover
- r = Retired
- d = Defaulted
- SR = Special ranking

=== Finals ===
Semifinals
1	(United States) Scott Davis (United States) David Pate	3	3
5	(United States) Luke Jensen (Australia) Laurie Warder	6	6
(United States) Jim Grabb (United States) Richey Reneberg	6	6
(United States) Todd Nelson (Australia) Jason Stoltenberg	4	4

Final
5	(United States) Luke Jensen (Australia) Laurie Warder	4	4
(United States) Jim Grabb (United States) Richey Reneberg	6	6

=== Top half ===
First round
Q	(United Kingdom) P Hand (United Kingdom) C Wilkinson	6	6
(Argentina) D Orsanic (Soviet Union) D Poliakov	2	4
(Czechoslovakia) S Doseděl (Italy) G Pozzi	3	5
WC	(United States) A Agassi (United States) M Washington	6	7
(Australia) R Fromberg (Australia) S Stolle	6	6	7
(Brazil) D Marcelino (United States) J Sobel	7	2	6
WC	(Australia) M Brown (Australia) A Kratzmann	6	6
(Australia) B Dyke (Sweden) P Lundgren	7	7

Second round
1	(United States) S Davis (United States) D Pate	6	6
Q	(United Kingdom) P Hand (United Kingdom) C Wilkinson	3	2
WC	(United States) A Agassi (United States) M Washington	3	4
8	(Australia) M Kratzmann (Australia) W Masur	6	6
4	(Croatia) G Ivanišević (South Africa) G Muller	w/o
(Australia) R Fromberg (Australia) S Stolle
(Australia) B Dyke (Sweden) P Lundgren	3	4
5	(United States) L Jensen (Australia) L Warder	6	6

Quarterfinals
1	(United States) S Davis (United States) D Pate	6	7
7	(Australia) M Kratzmann (Australia) W Masur	3	5
4	(Croatia) G Ivanišević (South Africa) G Muller	5	4
5	(United States) L Jensen (Australia) L Warder	7	6

Semifinals
1	(United States) S Davis (United States) D Pate	3	3
5	(United States) L Jensen (Australia) L Warder	6	6

=== Bottom half ===
First round
(Czechoslovakia) I Lendl (United States) P Sampras	7	6
(South Africa) D Adams (Soviet Union) A Olhovskiy	7	2	6
(United States) J Grabb (United States) R Reneberg	5	6	7
(Australia) N Borwick (Australia) S Youl	4	6
(United States) R Leach (United States) D Wheaton	6	7
(United States) B Garnett (United States) G Van Emburgh	6	4
(Czechoslovakia) T Anzari (Australia) C Limberger	6	6	4
(United States) T Nelson (Australia) J Stoltenberg	3	7	6

Second round
6	(South Africa) W Ferreira (South Africa) P Norval	7	6
(Czechoslovakia) I Lendl (United States) P Sampras	6	4
(United States) J Grabb (United States) R Reneberg	6	6
3	(Australia) T Woodbridge (Australia) M Woodforde	4	4
8	(Sweden) S Edberg (Australia) J Fitzgerald	6	6
(United States) R Leach (United States) D Wheaton	2	3
(United States) T Nelson (Australia) J Stoltenberg	6	6
2	(Canada) G Connell (Canada) G Michibata	4	2

Quarterfinals
6	(South Africa) W Ferreira (South Africa) P Norval	2	4
(United States) J Grabb (United States) R Reneberg	6	6
8	(Sweden) S Edberg (Australia) J Fitzgerald	5	4
(United States) T Nelson (Australia) J Stoltenberg	7	6

Semifinals
(United States) J Grabb (United States) R Reneberg	6	6
(United States) T Nelson (Australia) J Stoltenberg	4	4
