= 1993 Ansett Australian Indoor Championships – Singles =

Singles
- 1993 Ansett Australian Indoor Championships

Final
- Champion: (Peru) Jaime Yzaga
- Runner-up: (Czech Republic) Petr Korda
- Score: 6–4, 4–6, 7–6^{(7–4)}, 7–6^{(9–7)}

Details
- Draw: 32
- Seeds: 8

Events
Singles	Doubles
← 1992 ·	Australian Indoor Tennis Championships	· 1994 →

Goran Ivanišević was the defending champion but lost in the semifinals to Jaime Yzaga.

Yzaga won in the final 6–4, 4–6, 7–6^{(7–4)}, 7–6^{(9–7)} against Petr Korda.

== Seeds ==
1. (United States) Jim Courier (quarterfinals)
2. (Germany) Boris Becker (first round)
3. (Ukraine) Andriy Medvedev (second round)
4. (Croatia) Goran Ivanišević (semifinals)
5. (Netherlands) Richard Krajicek (first round)
6. (Czech Republic) Petr Korda (final)
7. (United States) Ivan Lendl (first round)
8. (Australia) Wally Masur (second round)

== Draw ==
=== Key ===
- Q = Qualifier
- WC = Wild card
- LL = Lucky loser
- Alt = Alternate
- SE = Special exempt
- PR = Protected ranking
- ITF = ITF entry
- JE = Junior exempt
- w/o = Walkover
- r = Retired
- d = Defaulted
- SR = Special ranking

=== Finals ===
Semifinals
(Peru) Jaime Yzaga	6	6
4	(Croatia) Goran Ivanišević	3	4
6	(Czech Republic) Petr Korda	6	6
(South Africa) Wayne Ferreira	3	2

Final
(Peru) Jaime Yzaga	6	4	7^{7}	7^{9}
6	(Czech Republic) Petr Korda	4	6	6^{4}	6^{7}

=== Section 1 ===
First round
1	(United States) J Courier	6	7
Q	(Germany) A Mronz	2	5
WC	(Australia) T Woodbridge	1	6	5
(Australia) R Fromberg	6	4	7
(Peru) J Yzaga	6	6
(United States) B Gilbert	2	2
(Netherlands) J Eltingh	1	1
8	(Australia) W Masur	6	6
4	(Croatia) G Ivanišević	6	6
(Australia) J Stoltenberg	4	2
Q	(United States) S Bryan	6	3	6
(United States) C Adams	2	6	3
(Sweden) M Pernfors	6	6
(United States) P McEnroe	3	3
(Australia) J Morgan	7^{7}	2	6
5	(Netherlands) R Krajicek	6^{5}	6	4

Second round
1	(United States) J Courier	6	6
(Australia) R Fromberg	4	3
(Peru) J Yzaga	6	6
8	(Australia) W Masur	1	4
4	(Croatia) G Ivanišević	0	6	6
Q	(United States) S Bryan	6	1	4
(Sweden) M Pernfors	6	4	6
(Australia) J Morgan	3	6	3

Quarterfinals
1	(United States) J Courier	4	6	4
(Peru) J Yzaga	6	2	6
4	(Croatia) G Ivanišević	6	6
(Sweden) M Pernfors	3	2

Semifinals
(Peru) J Yzaga	6	6
4	(Croatia) G Ivanišević	3	4

=== Section 2 ===
First round
6	(Czech Republic) P Korda	6	6
(Netherlands) P Haarhuis	3	1
WC	(Australia) P Rafter	7^{8}	6
(New Zealand) B Steven	6^{6}	4
(Sweden) J Svensson	6	3	6^{5}
(Australia) M Woodforde	3	6	7^{7}
Q	(Australia) H Denman	4	4
3	(Ukraine) A Medvedev	6	6
7	(United States) I Lendl	6	6^{8}	4
(United States) T Martin	4	7^{10}	6
(South Africa) W Ferreira	6	6
(United States) R Reneberg	4	2
Q	(United States) J Canter	4	6	6
(Sweden) H Holm	6	3	4
WC	(Australia) N Borwick	4	7^{8}	6
2	(Germany) B Becker	6	6^{6}	3

Second round
6	(Czech Republic) P Korda	6	6
WC	(Australia) P Rafter	4	2
(Australia) M Woodforde	6	6
3	(Ukraine) A Medvedev	2	4
(United States) T Martin	5	6^{7}
(South Africa) W Ferreira	7	7^{9}
Q	(United States) J Canter	7	6
WC	(Australia) N Borwick	5	3

Quarterfinals
6	(Czech Republic) P Korda	6	6
(Australia) M Woodforde	4	1
(South Africa) W Ferreira	5	6	6
Q	(United States) J Canter	7	4	2

Semifinals
6	(Czech Republic) P Korda	6	6
(South Africa) W Ferreira	3	2
