= 1993 Ansett Australian Indoor Championships – Doubles =

Doubles
- 1993 Ansett Australian Indoor Championships

Final
- Champions: (United States) Patrick McEnroe (United States) Richey Reneberg
- Runners-up: (Germany) Alexander Mronz (Germany) Lars Rehmann
- Score: 6–3, 7–5

Events
Singles	Doubles
← 1992 ·	Ansett Australian Indoor Championships	· 1994 →

Patrick McEnroe and Jonathan Stark were the defending champions but only McEnroe competed that year with Richey Reneberg.

McEnroe and Reneberg won in the final 6–3, 7–5 against Alexander Mronz and Lars Rehmann.

== Seeds ==
1. (Australia) Todd Woodbridge / (Australia) Mark Woodforde (quarterfinals)
2. (Canada) Grant Connell / (United States) Patrick Galbraith (semifinals)
3. (Netherlands) Jacco Eltingh / (Netherlands) Paul Haarhuis (semifinals)
4. (United States) Patrick McEnroe / (United States) Richey Reneberg (champions)

== Draw ==
=== Key ===
- Q = Qualifier
- WC = Wild card
- LL = Lucky loser
- Alt = Alternate
- SE = Special exempt
- PR = Protected ranking
- ITF = ITF entry
- JE = Junior exempt
- w/o = Walkover
- r = Retired
- d = Defaulted
- SR = Special ranking

First round
1	(Australia) T Woodbridge (Australia) M Woodforde	6	6	6
(Australia) J Fitzgerald (Netherlands) R Krajicek	4	7	4
(Canada) G Michibata (United States) D Pate	7	3	6
Q	(Germany) A Mronz (Germany) L Rehmann	6	6	7
3	(Netherlands) J Eltingh (Netherlands) P Haarhuis	4	6	6
LL	(Sweden) M Pernfors (United States) K Thorne	6	1	1
WC	(United States) I Lendl (New Zealand) B Steven	6	4
(Australia) P Rafter (Australia) L Warder	7	6
(South Africa) W Ferreira (Australia) S Stolle	6	5	3
LL	(Australia) H Denman (Australia) G Doyle	3	7	6
(United States) K Flach (United States) R Leach	6	3
4	(United States) P McEnroe (United States) R Reneberg	7	6
(United States) L Jensen (United States) M Jensen	4	4
(Australia) M Kratzmann (Australia) W Masur	6	6
(Sweden) H Holm (United States) M Keil	3	4
2	(Canada) G Connell (United States) P Galbraith	6	6

Quarterfinals
1	(Australia) T Woodbridge (Australia) M Woodforde	4	6	4
Q	(Germany) A Mronz (Germany) L Rehmann	6	3	6
3	(Netherlands) J Eltingh (Netherlands) P Haarhuis	6	6
(Australia) P Rafter (Australia) L Warder	1	2
LL	(Australia) H Denman (Australia) G Doyle	3	4
4	(United States) P McEnroe (United States) R Reneberg	6	6
(Australia) M Kratzmann (Australia) W Masur	2	4
2	(Canada) G Connell (United States) P Galbraith	6	6

Semifinals
Q	(Germany) A Mronz (Germany) L Rehmann	7	6
3	(Netherlands) J Eltingh (Netherlands) P Haarhuis	6	3
4	(United States) P McEnroe (United States) R Reneberg	7	6
2	(Canada) G Connell (United States) P Galbraith	6	4

Final
Q	(Germany) A Mronz (Germany) L Rehmann	3	5
4	(United States) P McEnroe (United States) R Reneberg	6	7
