= 1994 Australian Indoor Championships – Doubles =

Doubles
- 1994 Australian Indoor Championships

Final
- Champions: (Netherlands) Jacco Eltingh (Netherlands) Paul Haarhuis
- Runners-up: (Zimbabwe) Byron Black (United States) Jonathan Stark
- Score: 6–4, 7–6

Events
Singles	Doubles
← 1993 ·	Australian Indoor Championships

Patrick McEnroe and Richey Reneberg were the defending champions, but only Reneberg competed that year with Jim Grabb.

Grabb and Reneberg lost in the first round to Mark Kratzmann and Brett Steven.

Jacco Eltingh and Paul Haarhuis won the final 6–4, 7–6 against Byron Black and Jonathan Stark.

== Seeds ==
1. (Netherlands) Jacco Eltingh / (Netherlands) Paul Haarhuis (champions)
2. (Zimbabwe) Byron Black / (United States) Jonathan Stark (final)
3. (Canada) Grant Connell / (United States) Patrick Galbraith (first round)
4. (Australia) Todd Woodbridge / (Australia) Mark Woodforde (semifinals)

== Draw ==
=== Key ===
- Q = Qualifier
- WC = Wild card
- LL = Lucky loser
- Alt = Alternate
- SE = Special exempt
- PR = Protected ranking
- ITF = ITF entry
- JE = Junior exempt
- w/o = Walkover
- r = Retired
- d = Defaulted
- SR = Special ranking

First round
1	(Netherlands) J Eltingh (Netherlands) P Haarhuis	7	6
(United States) S Davis (United States) R Leach	6	2
(United States) K Kinnear (United States) D Wheaton	4	5
(United States) T Kronemann (Australia) D Macpherson	6	7
3	(Canada) G Connell (United States) P Galbraith	6	2
WC	(Croatia) G Ivanišević (Australia) P Rafter	7	6
WC	(Australia) S Stolle (Australia) J Stoltenberg	7	7
WC	(Germany) B Becker (Australia) W Masur	6	5
(Australia) A Florent (Sweden) N Kulti	3	2
Q	(United States) B Devening (South Africa) C van Rensburg	6	6
(South Africa) D Adams (Russia) A Olhovskiy	3	6	4
4	(Australia) T Woodbridge (Australia) M Woodforde	6	4	6
(Australia) M Kratzmann (New Zealand) B Steven	3	6	7
(United States) J Grabb (United States) R Reneberg	6	4	6
(Australia) D Cahill (Australia) J Fitzgerald	6	4	4
2	(Zimbabwe) B Black (United States) J Stark	4	6	6

Quarterfinals
1	(Netherlands) J Eltingh (Netherlands) P Haarhuis	6	4	7
(United States) T Kronemann (Australia) D Macpherson	2	6	6
WC	(Croatia) G Ivanišević (Australia) P Rafter	3	6	6
WC	(Australia) S Stolle (Australia) J Stoltenberg	6	4	7
Q	(United States) B Devening (South Africa) C van Rensburg	6	0	2
4	(Australia) T Woodbridge (Australia) M Woodforde	4	6	6
(Australia) M Kratzmann (New Zealand) B Steven	3	7	5
2	(Zimbabwe) B Black (United States) J Stark	6	6	7

Semifinals
1	(Netherlands) J Eltingh (Netherlands) P Haarhuis	6	7
WC	(Australia) S Stolle (Australia) J Stoltenberg	4	6
4	(Australia) T Woodbridge (Australia) M Woodforde	6	6	6
2	(Zimbabwe) B Black (United States) J Stark	2	7	7

Final
1	(Netherlands) J Eltingh (Netherlands) P Haarhuis	6	7
2	(Zimbabwe) B Black (United States) J Stark	4	6
