= 1991 Australian Indoor Championships =

- Date: 30 September – 7 October
- Edition: 19th
- Category: Championship Series
- Draw: 64S / 32D
- Prize money: $750,000 (Note: Total financial commitment for the tournament was $1,000,000.)
- Surface: Hard / indoor
- Location: Sydney, Australia
- Venue: Sydney Entertainment Centre

Champions

Singles
- (Sweden) Stefan Edberg

Doubles
- (United States) Jim Grabb / (United States) Richey Reneberg
← 1990 ·	Australian Indoor Championships	· 1992 →

The 1991 Australian Indoor Championships, also known by its sponsored name Uncle Toby's Australian Indoor Tennis Championships, was a men's tennis tournament played on indoor hard courts at the Sydney Entertainment Centre in Sydney in Australia and was part of the Championship Series of the 1991 ATP Tour. It was the 19th edition of the tournament and was held from 30 September through 7 October 1991. First–ranked Stefan Edberg won the singles title.

== Finals ==
=== Singles ===
(Sweden) Stefan Edberg defeated (United States) Brad Gilbert 6–2, 6–2, 6–2

- It was Edberg's 5th singles title of the year and the 32nd of his career.

=== Doubles ===
(United States) Jim Grabb / (United States) Richey Reneberg defeated (United States) Luke Jensen / (Australia) Laurie Warder 6–4, 6–4

- It was Dyke's 1st title of the year and the 7th of his career. It was Reneberg's 1st title of the year and the 3rd of his career.
