= 1990 Australian Indoor Championships – Singles =

Singles
- 1990 Australian Indoor Championships

Final
- Champion: (Germany) Boris Becker
- Runner-up: (Sweden) Stefan Edberg
- Score: 7–6^{(7–4)}, 6–4, 6–4

Details
- Draw: 48
- Seeds: 16

Events
Singles	Doubles
← 1989 ·	Australian Indoor Tennis Championships	· 1991 →

Ivan Lendl was the defending champion but lost in the semifinals to Stefan Edberg.

Boris Becker won in the final 7–6^{(7–4)}, 6–4, 6–4 against Edberg.

== Seeds ==
All sixteen seeds received a bye to the second round.

1. (Sweden) Stefan Edberg (final)
2. (Germany) Boris Becker (champion)
3. (Czechoslovakia) Ivan Lendl (semifinals)
4. (United States) Brad Gilbert (second round)
5. (United States) Aaron Krickstein (second round)
6. (United States) Michael Chang (third round)
7. (Australia) Richard Fromberg (second round)
8. (United States) Richey Reneberg (quarterfinals)
9. (United States) David Wheaton (quarterfinals)
10. (Australia) Wally Masur (third round)
11. (Germany) Carl-Uwe Steeb (second round)
12. (United States) Derrick Rostagno (second round)
13. (Australia) Darren Cahill (second round)
14. (United States) Jim Grabb (second round)
15. (Australia) Mark Kratzmann (third round)
16. (New Zealand) Kelly Evernden (third round)

== Draw ==
=== Key ===
- Q = Qualifier
- WC = Wild card
- LL = Lucky loser
- Alt = Alternate
- SE = Special exempt
- PR = Protected ranking
- ITF = ITF entry
- JE = Junior exempt
- w/o = Walkover
- r = Retired
- d = Defaulted
- SR = Special ranking

=== Finals ===
Semifinals
1	(Sweden) Stefan Edberg	3	7^{7}	6
3	(Czechoslovakia) Ivan Lendl	6	6^{4}	3
(Australia) Todd Woodbridge	5	4
2	(Germany) Boris Becker	7	6

Final
1	(Sweden) Stefan Edberg	6^{4}	4	4
2	(Germany) Boris Becker	7^{7}	6	6

=== Top half ===
==== Section 1 ====
First round
WC	(Sweden) L-A Wahlgren	3	3
(Sweden) N Kroon	6	6
Q	(Australia) S Youl	6	6
(Sweden) T Högstedt	1	4
(United States) P Chamberlin	3	3
Q	(Australia) S Stolle	6	6
(West Germany) P Kühnen	6	6
(West Germany) E Jelen	3	0

Second round
1	(Sweden) S Edberg	6	6
(Sweden) N Kroon	3	2
Q	(Australia) S Youl	3	6	3
15	(Australia) M Kratzmann	6	3	6
9	(United States) D Wheaton	4	6	6
Q	(Australia) S Stolle	6	0	2
(Germany) P Kühnen	7	6
7	(Australia) R Fromberg	6	2

Third round
1	(Sweden) S Edberg	6	7
15	(Australia) M Kratzmann	2	6
9	(United States) D Wheaton	7	3	6
(Germany) P Kühnen	5	6	3

Quarterfinals
1	(Sweden) S Edberg	6	7
9	(United States) D Wheaton	2	6

==== Section 2 ====
First round
(Finland) A Rahunen	6	6
(Australia) J Stoltenberg	4	4
(United States) S Davis	6	6	6
Q	(Japan) S Matsuoka	7	3	4
(Sweden) P Lundgren	6	6
(United States) D Goldie	2	4
Q	(United States) T Nelson	3	6	4
(United States) T Witsken	6	2	6

Second round
3	(Czechoslovakia) I Lendl	6	3	6
(Finland) A Rahunen	0	6	3
(United States) S Davis	3	6	6
14	(United States) J Grabb	6	3	3
11	(Germany) C-U Steeb	5	3
(Sweden) P Lundgren	7	6
(United States) T Witsken	6	1	4
6	(United States) M Chang	4	6	6

Third round
3	(Czechoslovakia) I Lendl	7	4	6
(United States) S Davis	6	6	3
(Sweden) P Lundgren	6	6
6	(United States) M Chang	2	4

Quarterfinals
3	(Czechoslovakia) I Lendl	6	7
(Sweden) P Lundgren	2	6

=== Bottom half ===
==== Section 3 ====
First round
(Canada) G Connell	7	6
Q	(Australia) C Eagle	6	4
(Netherlands) P Haarhuis	6	6	6
(Sweden) A Järryd	7	2	3
(United States) B Pearce	2	6	7
Q	(Sweden) D Engel	6	1	5
(United States) K Jones	4	0
(Australia) T Woodbridge	6	6

Second round
5	(United States) A Krickstein	6	0
(Canada) G Connell	7	6
(Netherlands) P Haarhuis	7	6
12	(United States) D Rostagno	6	4
13	(Australia) D Cahill	4	1
(United States) B Pearce	6	6
(Australia) T Woodbridge	7	6
4	(United States) B Gilbert	6	3

Third round
(Canada) G Connell	5	7	6
(Netherlands) P Haarhuis	7	5	4
(United States) B Pearce	3	6	3
(Australia) T Woodbridge	6	4	6

Quarterfinals
(Canada) G Connell	6	6	1
(Australia) T Woodbridge	7	2	6

==== Section 4 ====
First round
(United States) D Pate	6	6
(United States) B Shelton	2	3
WC	(Australia) J Fitzgerald	7	6	2
(Australia) P Cash	6	7	6
(United States) J Rive	7	6
WC	(Australia) J Anderson	6	3
WC	(Sweden) M Wilander	6	6
(Australia) M Woodforde	3	4

Second round
8	(United States) R Reneberg	6	6
(United States) D Pate	2	3
(Australia) P Cash	6	4	3
10	(Australia) W Masur	4	6	6
16	(New Zealand) K Evernden	6	2	7
(United States) J Rive	3	6	6
WC	(Sweden) M Wilander	2	5
2	(Germany) B Becker	6	7

Third round
8	(United States) R Reneberg	7	6
10	(Australia) W Masur	5	3
16	(New Zealand) K Evernden	4	3
2	(Germany) B Becker	6	6

Quarterfinals
8	(United States) R Reneberg	4	4
2	(Germany) B Becker	6	6
