= 1990 Australian Indoor Championships – Doubles =

Doubles
- 1990 Australian Indoor Championships

Final
- Champions: (Australia) Broderick Dyke (Sweden) Peter Lundgren
- Runners-up: (Sweden) Stefan Edberg (Czechoslovakia) Ivan Lendl
- Score: 6–2, 6–4

Details
- Draw: 24
- Seeds: 8

Events
Singles	Doubles
← 1989 ·	Australian Indoor Championships	· 1991 →

David Pate and Scott Warner were the defending champions but only Pate competed that year with Scott Davis.

Davis and Pate lost in the second round to John Fitzgerald and Mark Woodforde.

Broderick Dyke and Peter Lundgren won in the final 6–2, 6–4 against Stefan Edberg and Ivan Lendl.

== Seeds ==
All eight seeded teams received byes to the second round.

1. (Canada) Grant Connell / (Canada) Glenn Michibata (second round)
2. (United States) Scott Davis / (United States) David Pate (second round)
3. (Australia) Darren Cahill / (Australia) Mark Kratzmann (quarterfinals)
4. (Mexico) Jorge Lozano / (United States) Todd Witsken (semifinals)
5. (Australia) Jason Stoltenberg / (Australia) Todd Woodbridge (second round)
6. (New Zealand) Kelly Evernden / (United States) Kelly Jones (second round)
7. (United States) Jim Grabb / (United States) Richey Reneberg (quarterfinals)
8. (Australia) Broderick Dyke / (Sweden) Peter Lundgren (champions)

== Draw ==
=== Key ===
- Q = Qualifier
- WC = Wild card
- LL = Lucky loser
- Alt = Alternate
- SE = Special exempt
- PR = Protected ranking
- ITF = ITF entry
- JE = Junior exempt
- w/o = Walkover
- r = Retired
- d = Defaulted
- SR = Special ranking

=== Finals ===
Semifinals
8	(Australia) Broderick Dyke (Sweden) Peter Lundgren	7	2	6
4	(Mexico) Jorge Lozano (United States) Todd Witsken	5	6	3
(Sweden) Stefan Edberg (Czechoslovakia) Ivan Lendl	6	3	7
(Australia) John Fitzgerald (Australia) M Woodforde	4	6	6

Final
8	(Australia) Broderick Dyke (Sweden) Peter Lundgren	6	6
(Sweden) Stefan Edberg (Czechoslovakia) Ivan Lendl	2	4

=== Top half ===
First round
WC	(West Germany) P Kühnen (Sweden) L-A Wahlgren	7	4	6
(West Germany) B Becker (West Germany) E Jelen	5	6	7
(United States) M Davis (United States) J Rive	6	7
(United States) B Pearce (United States) K Thorne	4	5
Q	(Australia) M Brown (Australia) A Kratzmann	6	3	6
(Australia) P Doohan (Australia) S Youl	4	6	3
(United States) T Nelson (United States) B Shelton	6	2	7
(Australia) P Cash (Australia) W Masur	4	6	6

Second round
1	(Canada) G Connell (Canada) G Michibata	6	4
(Germany) B Becker (Germany) E Jelen	7	6
(United States) M Davis (United States) J Rive	4	3
8	(Australia) B Dyke (Sweden) P Lundgren	6	6
4	(Mexico) J Lozano (United States) T Witsken	6	6
(Australia) M Brown (Australia) A Kratzmann	3	3
(United States) T Nelson (United States) B Shelton	6	7
5	(Australia) J Stoltenberg (Australia) T Woodbridge	4	6

Quarterfinals
(Germany) B Becker (Germany) E Jelen	3	4
8	(Australia) B Dyke (Sweden) P Lundgren	6	6
4	(Mexico) J Lozano (United States) T Witsken	6	6
(United States) T Nelson (United States) B Shelton	4	1

Semifinals
8	(Australia) B Dyke (Sweden) P Lundgren	7	2	6
4	(Mexico) J Lozano (United States) T Witsken	5	6	3

=== Bottom half ===
First round
(Sweden) D Engel (United States) D Rostagno	2	0
(Sweden) S Edberg (Czechoslovakia) I Lendl	6	6
(Netherlands) T Bogtstra (Netherlands) P Haarhuis	6	6	6
WC	(Australia) R Rasheed (Australia) S Stolle	7	4	4
(Australia) B Drewett (Australia) R Fromberg	7	6
(United States) P Chamberlin (United States) R Van't Hof	5	3
(United States) B Garrow (United States) S Salumaa	5	2
(Australia) J Fitzgerald (Australia) M Woodforde	7	6

Second round
6	(New Zealand) K Evernden (United States) K Jones	6	7	3
(Sweden) S Edberg (Czechoslovakia) I Lendl	7	6	6
(Netherlands) T Bogtstra (Netherlands) P Haarhuis	4	6
3	(Australia) D Cahill (Australia) M Kratzmann	6	7
7	(United States) J Grabb (United States) R Reneberg	6	7
(Australia) B Drewett (Australia) R Fromberg	2	6
(Australia) J Fitzgerald (Australia) M Woodforde	6	3	7
2	(United States) S Davis (United States) D Pate	4	6	6

Quarterfinals
(Sweden) S Edberg (Czechoslovakia) I Lendl	6	3	7
3	(Australia) D Cahill (Australia) M Kratzmann	2	6	6
7	(United States) J Grabb (United States) R Reneberg	2	6	6
(Australia) J Fitzgerald (Australia) M Woodforde	6	4	7

Semifinals
(Sweden) S Edberg (Czechoslovakia) I Lendl	6	3	7
(Australia) J Fitzgerald (Australia) M Woodforde	4	6	6
