= 1990 Australian Indoor Championships =

- Date: 1–7 October
- Edition: 18th
- Category: Championship Series
- Draw: 48S / 24D
- Prize money: $750,000
- Surface: Hard / indoor
- Location: Sydney, Australia
- Venue: Sydney Entertainment Centre

Champions

Singles
- (West Germany) Boris Becker

Doubles
- (Australia) Broderick Dyke / (Sweden) Peter Lundgren
← 1989 ·	Australian Indoor Championships	· 1991 →

The 1990 Australian Indoor Championships was a men's tennis tournament played on indoor hard courts at the Sydney Entertainment Centre in Sydney in Australia and was part of the Championship Series of the 1990 ATP Tour. It was the 18th edition of the tournament and was held from 1 through 7 October 1990. Second-seeded Boris Becker won the singles title, his second at the event after 1986.

== Finals ==
=== Singles ===
(West Germany) Boris Becker defeated (Sweden) Stefan Edberg 7–6, 6–4, 6–4

- It was Becker's 4th singles title of the year and the 28th of his career.

=== Doubles ===
(Australia) Broderick Dyke / (Sweden) Peter Lundgren defeated (Sweden) Stefan Edberg / (Czechoslovakia) Ivan Lendl 6–2, 6–4

- It was Dyke's only title of the year and the 8th of his career. It was Lundgren's only title of the year and the 6th of his career.
