= 1994 Australian Indoor Championships – Singles =

Singles
- 1994 Australian Indoor Championships

Final
- Champion: (Netherlands) Richard Krajicek
- Runner-up: (Germany) Boris Becker
- Score: 7–6^{(7–5)}, 7–6^{(9–7)}, 2–6, 6–3

Details
- Draw: 32
- Seeds: 8

Events
Singles	Doubles
← 1993 ·	Australian Indoor Tennis Championships

Jaime Yzaga was the defending champion but lost in the first round to Aaron Krickstein.

Richard Krajicek won in the final 7–6^{(7–5)}, 7–6^{(9–7)}, 2–6, 6–3 against Boris Becker.

== Seeds ==
1. (Croatia) Goran Ivanišević (first round)
2. (Germany) Boris Becker (final)
3. (Peru) Jaime Yzaga (first round)
4. (Australia) Jason Stoltenberg (first round)
5. (Australia) Patrick Rafter (semifinals)
6. (Netherlands) Paul Haarhuis (first round)
7. (Netherlands) Richard Krajicek (champion)
8. (United States) David Wheaton (first round)

== Draw ==
=== Key ===
- Q = Qualifier
- WC = Wild card
- LL = Lucky loser
- Alt = Alternate
- SE = Special exempt
- PR = Protected ranking
- ITF = ITF entry
- JE = Junior exempt
- w/o = Walkover
- r = Retired
- d = Defaulted
- SR = Special ranking

=== Finals ===
Semifinals
7	(Netherlands) Richard Krajicek	6	7^{7}
5	(Australia) Patrick Rafter	1	6^{3}
(Australia) Mark Woodforde	6^{4}	1
2	(Germany) Boris Becker	7^{7}	6

Final
7	(Netherlands) Richard Krajicek	7^{7}	7^{9}	2	6
2	(Germany) Boris Becker	6^{5}	6^{7}	6	3

=== Section 1 ===
First round
1	(Croatia) G Ivanišević	6^{6}	3
(United States) R Reneberg	7^{8}	6
(United States) J Tarango	6	6
Q	(Canada) G Connell	4	1
(Canada) G Rusedski	7^{7}	4	5
(New Zealand) B Steven	6^{1}	6	7
(Australia) R Fromberg	6^{5}	3
7	(Netherlands) R Krajicek	7^{7}	6
3	(Peru) J Yzaga	6	2	3
(United States) A Krickstein	4	6	6
(Sweden) L Jonsson	3	5
(Sweden) C Bergström	6	7
WC	(Australia) B Ellwood	4	2
(Australia) W Masur	6	6
Q	(United States) L Gloria	6^{6}	5
5	(Australia) P Rafter	7^{8}	7

Second round
(United States) R Reneberg	5	4
(United States) J Tarango	7	6
(New Zealand) B Steven	5	3
7	(Netherlands) R Krajicek	7	6
(United States) A Krickstein	7^{7}	7^{7}
(Sweden) C Bergström	6^{4}	6^{3}
(Australia) W Masur	4	4
5	(Australia) P Rafter	6	6

Quarterfinals
(United States) J Tarango	1	5
7	(Netherlands) R Krajicek	6	7
(United States) A Krickstein	6	3	6^{2}
5	(Australia) P Rafter	3	6	7^{7}

Semifinals
7	(Netherlands) R Krajicek	6	7^{7}
5	(Australia) P Rafter	1	6^{3}

=== Section 2 ===
First round
6	(Netherlands) P Haarhuis	2	3
(Australia) M Woodforde	6	6
(Zimbabwe) B Black	6	6
(Australia) J Morgan	4	4
(United States) J Grabb	4	4
(Sweden) N Kulti	6	6
WC	(Australia) T Woodbridge	7	6
4	(Australia) J Stoltenberg	5	4
8	(United States) D Wheaton	6^{7}	6^{5}
(Netherlands) J Eltingh	7^{9}	7^{7}
(United States) J Stark	6	6
(United Kingdom) M Petchey	4	3
WC	(Australia) M Philippoussis	3	3
Q	(United States) S Bryan	6	6
Q	(Australia) S Stolle	6	2	4
2	(Germany) B Becker	4	6	6

Second round
(Australia) M Woodforde	6	6
(Zimbabwe) B Black	3	0
(Sweden) N Kulti	6	6
WC	(Australia) T Woodbridge	2	3
(Netherlands) J Eltingh	2	4
(United States) J Stark	6	6
Q	(United States) S Bryan	4	6	0
2	(Germany) B Becker	6	1	6

Quarterfinals
(Australia) M Woodforde	4	6	7
(Sweden) N Kulti	6	2	5
(United States) J Stark	6^{9}	3
2	(Germany) B Becker	7^{11}	6

Semifinals
(Australia) M Woodforde	6^{4}	1
2	(Germany) B Becker	7^{7}	6
