= 1991 Australian Indoor Championships – Singles =

Singles
- 1991 Australian Indoor Championships

Final
- Champion: (Sweden) Stefan Edberg
- Runner-up: (United States) Brad Gilbert
- Score: 6–2, 6–2, 6–2

Details
- Draw: 48
- Seeds: 16

Events
Singles	Doubles
← 1990 ·	Australian Indoor Tennis Championships	· 1992 →

Boris Becker was the defending champion but did not compete that year.

Stefan Edberg won in the final 6–2, 6–2, 6–2 against Brad Gilbert.

== Seeds ==
All sixteen seeds received a bye to the second round.

1. (Sweden) Stefan Edberg (champion)
2. (Czechoslovakia) Ivan Lendl (third round)
3. (United States) Pete Sampras (semifinals)
4. (United States) Andre Agassi (quarterfinals)
5. (United States) David Wheaton (quarterfinals)
6. (Croatia) Goran Ivanišević (semifinals)
7. (United States) Derrick Rostagno (second round)
8. (United States) Michael Chang (quarterfinals)
9. (United States) Brad Gilbert (final)
10. (Soviet Union) Andrei Chesnokov (second round)
11. (United States) Richey Reneberg (third round)
12. (United States) Aaron Krickstein (second round)
13. (Australia) Todd Woodbridge (third round)
14. (United States) MaliVai Washington (third round)
15. (Australia) Wally Masur (second round)
16. (South Africa) Wayne Ferreira (quarterfinals)

== Draw ==
=== Key ===
- Q = Qualifier
- WC = Wild card
- LL = Lucky loser
- Alt = Alternate
- SE = Special exempt
- PR = Protected ranking
- ITF = ITF entry
- JE = Junior exempt
- w/o = Walkover
- r = Retired
- d = Defaulted
- SR = Special ranking

=== Finals ===
Semifinals
1	(Sweden) Stefan Edberg	4	7^{7}	7^{7}
6	(Croatia) Goran Ivanišević	6	6^{2}	6^{5}
3	(United States) Pete Sampras	6	5	3
9	(United States) Brad Gilbert	1	7	6

Final
1	(Sweden) Stefan Edberg	6	6	6
9	(United States) Brad Gilbert	2	2	2

=== Top half ===
==== Section 1 ====
First round
(Sweden) P Lundgren	7^{7}	6
(South Africa) G Muller	6^{4}	3
WC	(Australia) G Doyle	2	1
(Australia) M Woodforde	6	6
(Italy) P Canè	5	6	1
(Italy) G Pozzi	7	1	6
(Sweden) T Högstedt	6^{2}	6^{5}
Q	(Sweden) N Kroon	7^{7}	7^{7}

Second round
1	(Sweden) S Edberg	6	6
(Sweden) P Lundgren	3	4
(Australia) M Woodforde	6	4	7^{7}
15	(Australia) W Masur	2	6	6^{4}
10	(Soviet Union) A Chesnokov	1	4
(Italy) G Pozzi	6	6
Q	(Sweden) N Kroon	3	4
8	(United States) M Chang	6	6

Third round
1	(Sweden) S Edberg	6	6
(Australia) M Woodforde	4	2
(Italy) G Pozzi	1	2
8	(United States) M Chang	6	6

Quarterfinals
1	(Sweden) S Edberg	6	7
8	(United States) M Chang	4	5

==== Section 2 ====
First round
(Australia) J Stoltenberg	7	6
(Czechoslovakia) S Doseděl	5	3
(United States) J Tarango	4	6	6
(United States) R Weiss	6	0	3
Q	(Australia) S Stolle	3	6	6
(Czechoslovakia) T Anzari	6	4	4
Q	(Australia) S Youl	4	6	6
(Australia) R Fromberg	6	2	3

Second round
4	(United States) A Agassi	6	6
(Australia) J Stoltenberg	2	2
(United States) J Tarango	6^{4}	2
14	(United States) M Washington	7^{7}	6
11	(United States) R Reneberg	4	7	7^{7}
Q	(Australia) S Stolle	6	5	6^{5}
Q	(Australia) S Youl	4	3
6	(Croatia) G Ivanišević	6	6

Third round
4	(United States) A Agassi	6	6
14	(United States) M Washington	3	1
11	(United States) R Reneberg	3	2
6	(Croatia) G Ivanišević	6	6

Quarterfinals
4	(United States) A Agassi	5	6^{3}
6	(Croatia) G Ivanišević	7	7^{7}

=== Bottom half ===
==== Section 3 ====
First round
WC	(Australia) J Morgan	1	5
WC	(Australia) N Borwick	6	7
(Canada) G Connell	6^{5}	6	7^{7}
Q	(United Kingdom) C Wilkinson	7^{7}	3	6^{5}
(Soviet Union) A Olhovskiy	5	3
(United States) J Grabb	7	6
Q	(United States) T Nelson	3	6	6
(Japan) S Matsuoka	6	3	4

Second round
5	(United States) D Wheaton	6	6
WC	(Australia) N Borwick	2	3
(Canada) G Connell	6	7^{7}
12	(United States) A Krickstein	4	6^{4}
13	(Australia) T Woodbridge	6	4	6
(United States) J Grabb	3	6	2
Q	(United States) T Nelson	6	1	4
3	(United States) P Sampras	4	6	6

Third round
5	(United States) D Wheaton	7	6
(Canada) G Connell	5	2
13	(Australia) T Woodbridge	2	1
3	(United States) P Sampras	6	6

Quarterfinals
5	(United States) D Wheaton	3	6	4
3	(United States) P Sampras	6	4	6

==== Section 4 ====
First round
(Mexico) L Herrera	2	1
(Brazil) D Marcelino	6	6
WC	(Australia) J Fitzgerald	6	6
(Australia) J Anderson	2	3
(United States) D Pate	0	6	3
(Soviet Union) D Poliakov	6	3	6
Q	(Argentina) D Orsanic	1	0
(United States) S Davis	6	6

Second round
7	(United States) D Rostagno	4	4
(Brazil) D Marcelino	6	6
WC	(Australia) J Fitzgerald	2	2
9	(United States) B Gilbert	6	6
16	(South Africa) W Ferreira	6	7
(Soviet Union) D Poliakov	4	5
(United States) S Davis	4	7^{7}	5
2	(Czechoslovakia) I Lendl	6	6^{5}	7

Third round
(Brazil) D Marcelino	1	2
9	(United States) B Gilbert	6	6
16	(South Africa) W Ferreira	6	2	7
2	(Czechoslovakia) I Lendl	4	6	5

Quarterfinals
9	(United States) B Gilbert	6	6
16	(South Africa) W Ferreira	1	4
