= 1994 Australian Indoor Championships =

- Date: 3–10 October
- Edition: 22nd
- Category: Championship Series
- Draw: 32S / 16D
- Prize money: $895,000
- Surface: Hard / indoor
- Location: Sydney, Australia
- Venue: Sydney Entertainment Centre

Champions

Singles
- (Netherlands) Richard Krajicek

Doubles
- (Netherlands) Jacco Eltingh / (Netherlands) Paul Haarhuis
← 1993 ·	Australian Indoor Championships

The 1994 Australian Indoor Championships was a men's tennis tournament played on indoor hard courts at the Sydney Entertainment Centre in Sydney, Australia and was part of the Championship Series of the 1994 ATP Tour. It was the 22nd and last edition of the tournament and was held from 3 through 10 October 1994. Seventh-seeded Richard Krajicek won the singles title.

== Finals ==
=== Singles ===
(Netherlands) Richard Krajicek defeated (Germany) Boris Becker 7–6^{(7–5)}, 7–6^{(9–7)}, 2–6, 6–3

- It was Krajicek's 3rd singles title of the year and the 7th of his career.

=== Doubles ===
(Netherlands) Jacco Eltingh / (Netherlands) Paul Haarhuis defeated (Zimbabwe) Byron Black / (United States) Jonathan Stark 6–4, 7–6

- It was Eltingh's 8th title of the year and the 22nd of his career. It was Haarhuis' 6th title of the year and the 19th of his career.
