= 1992 Australian Indoor Championships – Singles =

Singles
- 1992 Australian Indoor Championships

Final
- Champion: (Croatia) Goran Ivanišević
- Runner-up: (Sweden) Stefan Edberg
- Score: 6–4, 6–2, 6–4

Details
- Draw: 48
- Seeds: 16

Events
Singles	Doubles
← 1991 ·	Australian Indoor Tennis Championships	· 1993 →

Stefan Edberg was the defending champion but lost in the final 6–4, 6–2, 6–4 to Goran Ivanišević.

== Seeds ==
All sixteen seeds received a bye to the second round.

1. (Sweden) Stefan Edberg (final)
2. (Croatia) Goran Ivanišević (champion)
3. (United States) Andre Agassi (third round)
4. (United States) Ivan Lendl (quarterfinals)
5. (South Africa) Wayne Ferreira (third round)
6. (Netherlands) Richard Krajicek (semifinals)
7. (United States) John McEnroe (quarterfinals)
8. (Australia) Wally Masur (third round)
9. (Netherlands) Paul Haarhuis (quarterfinals)
10. (United States) Derrick Rostagno (second round)
11. (United States) David Wheaton (second round)
12. (Sweden) Henrik Holm (semifinals)
13. (Australia) Todd Woodbridge (second round)
14. (Australia) Mark Woodforde (third round)
15. (United States) Richey Reneberg (third round)
16. (Japan) Shuzo Matsuoka (second round)

== Draw ==
=== Key ===
- Q = Qualifier
- WC = Wild card
- LL = Lucky loser
- Alt = Alternate
- SE = Special exempt
- PR = Protected ranking
- ITF = ITF entry
- JE = Junior exempt
- w/o = Walkover
- r = Retired
- d = Defaulted
- SR = Special ranking

=== Finals ===
Semifinals
1	(Sweden) Stefan Edberg	6	3	6
12	(Sweden) Henrik Holm	2	6	3
6	(Netherlands) Richard Krajicek	3	0^{r}
2	(Croatia) Goran Ivanišević	6	1

Final
1	(Sweden) Stefan Edberg	4	2	4
2	(Croatia) Goran Ivanišević	6	6	6

=== Top half ===
==== Section 1 ====
First round
(United States) P McEnroe	3	6	6^{2}
(Germany) P Baur	6	3	7^{7}
(Australia) S Stolle	7^{7}	3	6^{3}
Q	(South Africa) L Bale	6^{5}	6	7^{7}
(Zimbabwe) B Black	6	6
Q	(Australia) J Anderson	1	3
(Australia) S Youl	4	6^{4}
Q	(Commonwealth of Independent States) A Olhovskiy	6	7^{7}

Second round
1	(Sweden) S Edberg	7^{8}	7
(Germany) P Baur	6^{6}	5
Q	(South Africa) L Bale	0	3
15	(United States) R Reneberg	6	6
10	(United States) D Rostagno	6^{7}	7^{7}	4
(Zimbabwe) B Black	7^{9}	6^{5}	6
Q	(Commonwealth of Independent States) A Olhovskiy	6	2	0
7	(United States) J McEnroe	1	6	6

Third round
1	(Sweden) S Edberg	6	6
15	(United States) R Reneberg	4	2
(Zimbabwe) B Black	6^{8}	6	1
7	(United States) J McEnroe	7^{10}	3	6

Quarterfinals
1	(Sweden) S Edberg	6	6
7	(United States) J McEnroe	3	3

==== Section 2 ====
First round
(United States) J Grabb	6	6
WC	(Australia) J Fitzgerald	4	4
(Italy) D Nargiso	6^{3}	6^{6}
(Germany) P Kühnen	7^{7}	7^{8}
Q	(United States) D Pate	7^{7}	3	7^{7}
(United States) B Shelton	6^{5}	6	6^{5}
(Australia) R Fromberg	6	6
(Canada) C Pridham	3	2

Second round
3	(United States) A Agassi	6	6
(United States) J Grabb	4	2
(Germany) P Kühnen	7^{7}	6
13	(Australia) T Woodbridge	6^{5}	4
12	(Sweden) H Holm	6	6
Q	(United States) D Pate	3	2
(Australia) R Fromberg	3	3
5	(South Africa) W Ferreira	6	6

Third round
3	(United States) A Agassi	3	4
(Germany) P Kühnen	6	6
12	(Sweden) H Holm	7^{7}	3	6
5	(South Africa) W Ferreira	6^{5}	6	4

Quarterfinals
(Germany) P Kühnen	3	2
12	(Sweden) H Holm	6	6

=== Bottom half ===
==== Section 3 ====
First round
Q	(United States) S Davis	5	1
(Austria) A Antonitsch	7	6
(United Kingdom) J Bates	1	4
WC	(Australia) N Borwick	6	6
(Netherlands) J Eltingh	3	6^{5}
(United States) T Martin	6	7^{7}
(New Zealand) B Steven	6^{5}	6	6
(United States) J Stark	7^{7}	3	2

Second round
6	(Netherlands) R Krajicek	6	6
(Austria) A Antonitsch	1	1
WC	(Australia) N Borwick	6	3	6
11	(United States) D Wheaton	0	6	4
14	(Australia) M Woodforde	6^{1}	7	6
(United States) T Martin	7^{7}	5	3
(New Zealand) B Steven	5	5
4	(United States) I Lendl	7	7

Third round
6	(Netherlands) R Krajicek	6	4	6
WC	(Australia) N Borwick	3	6	2
14	(Australia) M Woodforde	2	4
4	(United States) I Lendl	6	6

Quarterfinals
6	(Netherlands) R Krajicek	7^{7}	7
4	(United States) I Lendl	6^{1}	5

==== Section 4 ====
First round
(France) G Raoux	4	6	6^{1}
WC	(Australia) J Morgan	6	3	7^{7}
WC	(Australia) G Doyle	7	6
(South Africa) G Muller	5	2
(Denmark) K Carlsen	6^{5}	4
(South Africa) C van Rensburg	7^{7}	6
(Italy) G Pozzi	6	6
Q	(Sweden) N Kroon	2	2

Second round
8	(Australia) W Masur	6	6
WC	(Australia) J Morgan	4	3
WC	(Australia) G Doyle	1	3
9	(Netherlands) P Haarhuis	6	6
16	(Japan) S Matsuoka	5	6^{1}
(South Africa) C van Rensburg	7	7^{7}
(Italy) G Pozzi	2	4
2	(Croatia) G Ivanišević	6	6

Third round
8	(Australia) W Masur	3^{r}
9	(Netherlands) P Haarhuis	5
(South Africa) C van Rensburg	4	4
2	(Croatia) G Ivanišević	6	6

Quarterfinals
9	(Netherlands) P Haarhuis	6^{1}	3
2	(Croatia) G Ivanišević	7^{7}	6
