= 1992 Australian Indoor Championships – Doubles =

Doubles
- 1992 Australian Indoor Championships

Final
- Champions: (United States) Patrick McEnroe (United States) Jonathan Stark
- Runners-up: (United States) Jim Grabb (United States) Richey Reneberg
- Score: 6–2, 6–3

Details
- Draw: 24
- Seeds: 8

Events
Singles	Doubles
- Australian Indoor Championships

Jim Grabb and Richey Reneberg were the defending champions but lost in the final 6–2, 6–3 to Patrick McEnroe and Jonathan Stark.

== Seeds ==
All eight seeded teams received byes to the second round.

1. (United States) Jim Grabb / (United States) Richey Reneberg (final)
2. (Australia) Todd Woodbridge / (Australia) Mark Woodforde (quarterfinals)
3. (United States) Patrick Galbraith / (South Africa) Danie Visser (second round)
4. (United States) Luke Jensen / (Australia) Laurie Warder (semifinals)
5. (Australia) Mark Kratzmann / (Australia) Wally Masur (quarterfinals, withdrew)
6. (United States) Steve DeVries / (Australia) David Macpherson (second round)
7. (Canada) Grant Connell / (Canada) Glenn Michibata (second round)
8. (South Africa) David Adams / (Commonwealth of Independent States) Andrei Olhovskiy (quarterfinals)

== Draw ==
Key

- Q = Qualifier
- WC = Wild card
- LL = Lucky loser
- Alt = Alternate
- ITF = ITF entry
- PR = Protected ranking
- SR = Special ranking
- SE = Special exempt
- JE = Junior exempt
- JR = Junior Accelerator Programme entrant
- CO = College Accelerator Programme entrant
- NG = Next Gen Accelerator Program entrant
- w/o = Walkover
- r = Retired
- d = Defaulted

=== Finals ===
Semifinals
1	(United States) Jim Grabb (United States) Richey Reneberg	5	6	6
4	(United States) Luke Jensen (Australia) Laurie Warder	7	3	3
(Netherlands) Paul Haarhuis (Croatia) Goran Ivanišević	2	6	5
(United States) Patrick McEnroe (United States) Jonathan Stark	6	4	7

Final
1	(United States) Jim Grabb (United States) Richey Reneberg	2	3
(United States) Patrick McEnroe (United States) Jonathan Stark	6	6

=== Top half ===
First round
(Australia) N Borwick (Australia) S Youl	6	6
(United States) S Salumaa (Australia) S Stolle	3	4
WC	(Australia) A Kratzmann (Australia) R Rasheed	1	4
(South Africa) W Ferreira (South Africa) P Norval	6	6
Q	(Zimbabwe) B Black (United States) T.J. Middleton	6	6
(United States) S Davis (United States) D Pate	4	0
(Australia) B Dyke (Italy) D Nargiso	3	4
WC	(Australia) J Morgan (South Africa) C van Rensburg	6	6

Second round
1	(United States) J Grabb (United States) R Reneberg	2	6	6
(Australia) N Borwick (Australia) S Youl	6	2	4
(South Africa) W Ferreira (South Africa) P Norval	2	4
8	(South Africa) D Adams (Commonwealth of Independent States) A Olhovskiy	6	6
4	(United States) L Jensen (Australia) L Warder	7	7
Q	(Zimbabwe) B Black (United States) T.J. Middleton	5	5
WC	(Australia) J Morgan (South Africa) C van Rensburg	3	4
5	(Australia) M Kratzmann (Australia) W Masur	6	6

Quarterfinals
1	(United States) J Grabb (United States) R Reneberg	6	6
8	(South Africa) D Adams (Commonwealth of Independent States) A Olhovskiy	4	4
4	(United States) L Jensen (Australia) L Warder	w/o
5	(Australia) M Kratzmann (Australia) W Masur

Semifinals
1	(United States) J Grabb (United States) R Reneberg	5	6	6
4	(United States) L Jensen (Australia) L Warder	7	3	3

=== Bottom half ===
First round
(Sweden) S Edberg (Australia) J Fitzgerald	6	6
(South Africa) P Aldrich (South Africa) G Muller	4	1
WC	(Australia) C Limberger (New Zealand) B Steven	4	4
(Netherlands) P Haarhuis (Croatia) G Ivanišević	6	6
(United States) P McEnroe (United States) J Stark	6	7
(Netherlands) R Krajicek (United States) D Wheaton	4	6
(Netherlands) J Eltingh (United States) B Shelton	6	6	3
(United States) B Garnett (United States) K Thorne	7	4	6

Second round
6	(United States) S DeVries (Australia) D Macpherson	7	4	6
(Sweden) S Edberg (Australia) J Fitzgerald	6	6	7
(Netherlands) P Haarhuis (Croatia) G Ivanišević	6	6
3	(United States) P Galbraith (South Africa) D Visser	3	1
7	(Canada) G Connell (Canada) G Michibata	6	3
(United States) P McEnroe (United States) J Stark	7	6
(United States) B Garnett (United States) K Thorne	1	3
2	(Australia) T Woodbridge (Australia) M Woodforde	6	6

Quarterfinals
(Sweden) S Edberg (Australia) J Fitzgerald	6	4
(Netherlands) P Haarhuis (Croatia) G Ivanišević	7	6
(United States) P McEnroe (United States) J Stark	6	7
2	(Australia) T Woodbridge (Australia) M Woodforde	4	6

Semifinals
(Netherlands) P Haarhuis (Croatia) G Ivanišević	2	6	5
(United States) P McEnroe (United States) J Stark	6	4	7
