= 1993 Ansett Australian Indoor Championships =

1993 Australian Indoor Championships
- Date: 4–11 October
- Edition: 21st
- Category: Championship Series
- Draw: 64S / 16D
- Prize money: $875,000
- Surface: Hard / indoor
- Location: Sydney, Australia
- Venue: Sydney Entertainment Centre

Champions

Singles
- (Peru) Jaime Yzaga

Doubles
- (United States) Patrick McEnroe / (United States) Richey Reneberg
← 1992 ·	Australian Indoor Championships	· 1994 →

The 1993 Ansett Australian Indoor Championships was a men's tennis tournament played on indoor hard courts at the Sydney Entertainment Centre in Sydney, Australia and was part of the Championship Series of the 1993 ATP Tour. It was the 21st edition of the tournament and was held from 4 through 11 October 1993. Unseeded Jaime Yzaga won the singles title.

== Finals ==
=== Singles ===
(Peru) Jaime Yzaga defeated (Czech Republic) Petr Korda 6–4, 4–6, 7–6^{(7–4)}, 7–6^{(9–7)}

- It was Yzaga's 2nd singles title of the year and the 8th and last of his career.

=== Doubles ===
(United States) Patrick McEnroe / (United States) Richey Reneberg defeated (Germany) Alexander Mronz / (Germany) Lars Rehmann 6–3, 7–5

- It was McEnroe's 3rd title of the year and the 12th of his career. It was Reneberg's 4th title of the year and the 12th of his career.
