= 1992 Australian Indoor Championships =

- Date: 5–11 October
- Edition: 20th
- Category: Championship Series
- Draw: 64S / 32D
- Prize money: $825,000
- Surface: Hard / indoor
- Location: Sydney, Australia
- Venue: Sydney Entertainment Centre

Champions

Singles
- (Croatia) Goran Ivanišević

Doubles
- (United States) Patrick McEnroe / (United States) Jonathan Stark
- Australian Indoor Championships

The 1992 Australian Indoor Championships was a men's tennis tournament played on indoor hard courts at the Sydney Entertainment Centre in Sydney, Australia and was part of the Championship Series of the 1992 ATP Tour. It was the 20th edition of the tournament and ran from 5 through 11 October 1992. Second-seeded Goran Ivanišević won the singles title.

== Finals ==
=== Singles ===
(Croatia) Goran Ivanišević defeated (Sweden) Stefan Edberg 6–4, 6–2, 6–4

- It was Ivanišević's 2nd singles title of the year and the 5th of his career.

=== Doubles ===
(United States) Patrick McEnroe / (United States) Jonathan Stark defeated (United States) Jim Grabb / (United States) Richey Reneberg 6–2, 6–3

- It was McEnroe's 2nd title of the year and the 8th of his career. It was Stark's 2nd title of the year and the 2nd of his career.
