= 1997 President's Cup – Singles =

Singles
- 1997 President's Cup

Final
- Champion: (United Kingdom) Tim Henman
- Runner-up: (Switzerland) Marc Rosset
- Score: 7–6^{(7–2)}, 6–4

Details
- Draw: 32
- Seeds: 8

Events
Singles	Doubles
- ATP Tashkent Open

The 1997 Tashkent Open was a men's tennis tournament held in Tashkent, Uzbekistan and played on outdoor hardcourts. It was the inaugural edition of the tournament, part of the 1997 ATP Tour, and was held from September 8 to September 15.

Tim Henman defeated Marc Rosset 7–6^{(7–2)}, 6–4 in the final to secure the title.

== Seeds ==
The text in italics indicates the round in which that seed was eliminated.

1. (Russia) Yevgeny Kafelnikov (semifinals)
2. (United Kingdom) Tim Henman (champion)
3. (Switzerland) Marc Rosset (final)
4. (Spain) Javier Sánchez (quarterfinals)
5. (Morocco) Hicham Arazi (quarterfinals)
6. (Spain) Francisco Clavet (semifinals)
7. (Germany) Nicolas Kiefer (first round)
8. (United States) Vincent Spadea (quarterfinals)

== Draws ==
Key

- Q = Qualifier
- WC = Wild card
- LL = Lucky loser
- Alt = Alternate
- ITF = ITF entry
- PR = Protected ranking
- SR = Special ranking
- SE = Special exempt
- JE = Junior exempt
- JR = Junior Accelerator Programme entrant
- CO = College Accelerator Programme entrant
- NG = Next Gen Accelerator Program entrant
- w/o = Walkover
- r = Retired
- d = Defaulted

=== Finals ===
Semifinals					Final
1	(Russia) Yevgeny Kafelnikov	6	6^{5}	2
3	(Switzerland) Marc Rosset	3	7^{7}	6	3	(Switzerland) Marc Rosset	6^{2}	4
6	(Spain) Francisco Clavet	3	5		WC/2	(United Kingdom) Tim Henman	7^{7}	6
WC/2	(United Kingdom) Tim Henman	6	7

=== Top half ===
First round
1	(Russia) Y Kafelnikov	6	6
Q	(Uzbekistan) D Tomashevich	4	2
(Italy) C Caratti	4	2
Q	(Israel) N Welgreen	6	6
(Switzerland) I Heuberger	4	5
(Uzbekistan) O Ogorodov	6	7
Q	(Russia) A Stoliarov	6	6^{2}	6
WC/7	(Germany) N Kiefer	4	7^{7}	1
3	(Switzerland) M Rosset	6	6
(Russia) A Cherkasov	4	2
(Russia) A Merinov	4	3
(Italy) V Santopadre	6	6
(Romania) R Sabău	6	1	2
(Austria) S Koubek	4	6	6
(Paraguay) R Delgado	6	4	3
5	(Morocco) H Arazi	4	6	6

Second round
1	(Russia) Y Kafelnikov	6	6
Q	(Israel) N Welgreen	1	4
(Uzbekistan) O Ogorodov	6	3	3
Q	(Russia) A Stoliarov	3	6	6
3	(Switzerland) M Rosset	6	6^{6}	6
(Italy) V Santopadre	3	7^{8}	2
(Austria) S Koubek	6	3	6^{4}
5	(Morocco) H Arazi	3	6	7^{7}

Quarterfinals
1	(Russia) Y Kafelnikov	6	6
Q	(Russia) A Stoliarov	4	4
3	(Switzerland) M Rosset	6	6
5	(Morocco) H Arazi	2	4

Semifinals
1	(Russia) Y Kafelnikov	6	6^{5}	2
3	(Switzerland) M Rosset	3	7^{7}	6

=== Bottom half ===
First round
6	(Spain) F Clavet	6	6
(Argentina) G Cañas	3	3
(Israel) E Erlich	7	7
WC	(Uzbekistan) A Makhkamov	5	5
Q	(Israel) R Weidenfeld	7^{9}	2	3
(Romania) A Pavel	6^{7}	6	6
(Slovakia) J Krošlák	2	0
4	(Spain) J Sánchez	6	6
8	(United States) V Spadea	2	6	6
(United States) S Campbell	6	2	3
(Israel) E Ran	6	6
(Italy) G Pozzi	3	3
(Russia) A Volkov	6	1	6
(Denmark) K Carlsen	4	6	3
(France) T Champion	4	7^{7}	6^{4}
WC/2	(United Kingdom) T Henman	6	6^{5}	7^{7}

Second round
6	(Spain) F Clavet	3	6	6
(Israel) E Erlich	6	4	3
(Romania) A Pavel	6^{4}	3
4	(Spain) J Sánchez	7^{7}	6
8	(United States) V Spadea	7	6^{4}	6
(Israel) E Ran	5	7^{7}	3
(Russia) A Volkov	3	3
WC/2	(United Kingdom) T Henman	6	6

Quarterfinals
6	(Spain) F Clavet	6	6
4	(Spain) J Sánchez	1	2
8	(United States) V Spadea	3	4
WC/2	(United Kingdom) T Henman	6	6

Semifinals
6	(Spain) F Clavet	3	5
WC/2	(United Kingdom) T Henman	6	7
