= 1997 President's Cup =

- Date: 8–15 September
- Edition: 1st
- Category: World Series
- Draw: 32S / 16D
- Prize money: $328,000
- Surface: Hard / outdoor
- Location: Tashkent, Uzbekistan

Champions

Singles
- (United Kingdom) Tim Henman

Doubles
- (Italy) Vincenzo Santopadre / (United States) Vincent Spadea
ATP Tashkent Open	· 1998 →

The 1997 Tashkent Open was a men's tennis tournament held in Tashkent, Uzbekistan and played on outdoor hard courts. It was the inaugural edition of the tournament, part of the World Series of the 1997 ATP Tour, and was held from 8 September until 15 to September 1997. Second-seeded Tim Henman won the singles final.

== Finals ==
=== Singles ===
(United Kingdom) Tim Henman defeated (Switzerland) Marc Rosset, 7–6^{(7–2)}, 6–4

- It was Henman's 2nd singles title of the year and of his career

=== Doubles ===
(Italy) Vincenzo Santopadre / (United States) Vincent Spadea defeated (Morocco) Hicham Arazi / (Israel) Eyal Ran, 6–4, 6–7, 6–0
