= 1998 President's Cup – Singles =

Singles
- 1998 President's Cup

Final
- Champion: (United Kingdom) Tim Henman
- Runner-up: (Russia) Yevgeny Kafelnikov
- Score: 7–5, 6–4

Events
Singles	Doubles
- ATP Tashkent Open

The 1998 President's Cup was a men's tennis tournament played on hardcourt in Tashkent, Uzbekistan that was part of the International Series of the 1998 ATP Tour. It was the second edition of the tournament and was held from 14 September – 20 September.

== Seeds ==
Champion seeds are indicated in bold text while text in italics indicates the round in which those seeds were eliminated.

1. (Russia) Yevgeny Kafelnikov (final)
2. (United Kingdom) **Tim Henman (champion)**
3. (France) Cédric Pioline (semifinals)
4. (France) Nicolas Escudé (semifinals)
5. (Switzerland) Marc Rosset (second round)
6. (Russia) Marat Safin (quarterfinals)
7. (Denmark) Kenneth Carlsen (first round)
8. (Germany) David Prinosil (first round)

== Draw ==
Key

- Q = Qualifier
- WC = Wild card
- LL = Lucky loser
- Alt = Alternate
- ITF = ITF entry
- PR = Protected ranking
- SR = Special ranking
- SE = Special exempt
- JE = Junior exempt
- JR = Junior Accelerator Programme entrant
- CO = College Accelerator Programme entrant
- NG = Next Gen Accelerator Program entrant
- w/o = Walkover
- r = Retired
- d = Defaulted

=== Finals ===
Semifinals
1	**(Russia) Yevgeny Kafelnikov**	**6**	**6**
3	(France) Cédric Pioline	2	2
4	(France) Nicolas Escudé	**6**	3	4
2	**(United Kingdom) Tim Henman**	3	**6**	**6**

Final
1	(Russia) Yevgeny Kafelnikov	5	4
2	**(United Kingdom) Tim Henman**	**7**	**6**

=== Top half ===
First round
1	**(Russia) Y Kafelnikov**	**6**	**6**
Q	(Germany) M Sinner	4	2
**(South Africa) D Nainkin**	3	**6**	**6**
(France) L Roux	**6**	2	3
**(Argentina) G Etlis**	2	**6**	**7**
(South Africa) N Godwin	**6**	4	5
**(Belarus) V Voltchkov**	**6**	4	**6**
8	(Germany) D Prinosil	4	**6**	4
3	**(France) C Pioline**	**6**	**6**
WC	(Uzbekistan) V Kutsenko	3	3
**(Italy) L Tieleman**	**7**	**6**
(Germany) R Schüttler	6^{6}	3
**(Netherlands) R Wassen**	3	**6**	**6**
(Germany) L Burgsmüller	**6**	2	3
6	**(Russia) M Safin**	**6**	**6**
WC	(Uzbekistan) T Ganiev	2	2

Second round
1	**(Russia) Y Kafelnikov**	**6**	**6**
(South Africa) D Nainkin	3	0
**(Argentina) G Etlis**	**7**	**6**
(Belarus) V Voltchkov	5	2
3	**(France) C Pioline**	4	**7**	**6**
(Italy) Laurence Tieleman	**6**	6^{6}	4
(Netherlands) R Wassen	3	2
6	**(Russia) M Safin**	**6**	**6**

Quarterfinals
1	**(Russia) Y Kafelnikov**	**6**	3	**6**
(Argentina) G Etlis	3	**6**	1
3	**(France) C Pioline**	6^{3}	**6**	**7**
6	(Russia) M Safin	**7**	2	6^{3}

Semifinals
1	**(Russia) Y Kafelnikov**	**6**	**6**
3	(France) C Pioline	2	2

=== Bottom half ===
First round
5	**(Switzerland) M Rosset**	**7**	**7**
(Finland) T Ketola	6^{10}	5
Q	**(Germany) K Braasch**	**6**	**7**
(Germany) M Hantschk	4	6^{5}
**(Netherlands) S Schalken**	**6**	6^{5}	**7**
(Spain) Ó Burrieza	4	**7**	6^{5}
4	**(France) N Escudé**	**6**	**6**
WC	(Uzbekistan) D Tomashevich	3	3
**(Italy) S Pescosolido**	**7**	**6**
7	(Denmark) K Carlsen	6^{2}	2
Q	**(Israel) H Levy**	**6**	3	**6**
(Uzbekistan) O Ogorodov	4	**6**	3
**(Israel) E Ran**	**6**	**6**
(Czech Republic) P Luxa	3	3
2	**(United Kingdom) T Henman**	**6**	**6**
Q	(Israel) N Welgreen	1	4

Second round
5	(Switzerland) M Rosset	4	**7**	3
Q	**(Germany) K Braasch**	**6**	6^{6}	**6**
(Netherlands) S Schalken	4	6^{7}
4	**(France) N Escudé**	**6**	**7**
**(Italy) S Pescosolido**	4	**7**	**6**
Q	(Israel) H Levy	**6**	6^{1}	3
(Israel) E Ran	4	1
2	**(United Kingdom) T Henman**	**6**	**6**

Quarterfinals
Q	(Germany) K Braasch	4	6^{5}
4	**(France) N Escudé**	**6**	**7**
(Italy) S Pescosolido	4	4
2	**(United Kingdom) T Henman**	**6**	**6**

Semifinals
4	(France) N Escudé	**6**	3	4
2	**(United Kingdom) T Henman**	3	**6**	**6**
