= 1997 President's Cup – Doubles =

Doubles
- 1997 President's Cup

Final
- Champions: (Italy) Vincenzo Santopadre (United States) Vincent Spadea
- Runners-up: (Morocco) Hicham Arazi (Israel) Eyal Ran
- Score: 6–4, 6–7, 6–0

Events
Singles	Doubles
President's Cup	· 1998 →

The 1997 Tashkent Open was a men's tennis tournament held in Tashkent, Uzbekistan and played on outdoor hard courts. It was the inaugural edition of the tournament, part of the 1997 ATP Tour, and was held from September 8 to September 15.

== Seeds ==
Champion seeds are indicated in bold text while text in italics indicates the round in which those seeds were eliminated.

1. (Germany) Karsten Braasch / (The Bahamas) Roger Smith (semifinals)
2. (Netherlands) Sander Groen / (Romania) Andrei Pavel (semifinals)
3. (Israel) Noam Behr / (Israel) Eyal Erlich (quarterfinals)
4. (Italy) **Vincenzo Santopadre** / (United States) **Vince Spadea (champions)**

== Draw ==
=== Key ===
- Q = Qualifier
- WC = Wild card
- LL = Lucky loser
- Alt = Alternate
- SE = Special exempt
- PR = Protected ranking
- ITF = ITF entry
- JE = Junior exempt
- w/o = Walkover
- r = Retired
- d = Defaulted
- SR = Special ranking

=== Finals ===
First round
1	(Germany) **K Braasch** **(The Bahamas) R Smith**	**7**	**6**
(Argentina) G Cañas (Paraguay) J Delgado	6	3
(Switzerland) **I Heuberger** **(Israel) R Weidenfeld**	**6**	**6**
Q	(Uzbekistan) A Ivanov (Uzbekistan) D Mazur	2	0
3	(Israel) **N Behr** **(Israel) E Erlich**	**6**	**7**
(Uzbekistan) V Kucenko (Uzbekistan) D Tomashevich	4	6
(Morocco) **H Arazi** **(Israel) E Ran**	**6**	**6**
WC	(Uzbekistan) T Khankodjaev (Uzbekistan) A Kokurin	4	2
(Germany) **N Kiefer** **(Uzbekistan) O Ogorodov**	3	**7**	**6**
(Denmark) K Carlsen (Germany) C Saceanu	**6**	6	4
4	(Italy) **V Santopadre** **(United States) V Spadea**	**6**	**6**
WC	(Germany) M Commandeur (Germany) B Phau	3	0
(United States) **S Campbell** **(Latvia) Ģirts Dzelde**	**7**	**6**
WC	(Uzbekistan) T Ganiev (Uzbekistan) A-H Makhkamov	6	1
2	(Netherlands) **S Groen** **(Romania) A Pavel**	**6**	**6**
(Russia) A Stoliarov (Israel) N Welgreen	1	3

Quarterfinals
1	(Germany) **K Braasch** **(The Bahamas) R Smith**	**6**	**6**
(Switzerland) I Heuberger (Israel) R Weidenfeld	4	4
3	(Israel) N Behr (Israel) E Erlich	**6**	4	4
(Morocco) **H Arazi** **(Israel) E Ran**	2	**6**	**6**
(Germany) N Kiefer (Uzbekistan) O Ogorodov	1	3
4	(Italy) **V Santopadre** **(United States) V Spadea**	**6**	**6**
(United States) S Campbell (Latvia) Ģirts Dzelde	2	4
2	(Netherlands) **S Groen** **(Romania) A Pavel**	**6**	**6**

Semifinals
1	(Germany) K Braasch (The Bahamas) R Smith	3	**6**	4
(Morocco) **H Arazi** **(Israel) E Ran**	**6**	3	**6**
4	(Italy) **V Santopadre** **(United States) V Spadea**	3	**6**	**7**
2	(Netherlands) S Groen (Romania) A Pavel	**6**	4	6

Final
(Morocco) H Arazi (Israel) E Ran	4	**7**	0
4	(Italy) **V Santopadre** **(United States) V Spadea**	**6**	6	**6**
