= 1998 President's Cup – Doubles =

Doubles
- 1998 President's Cup

Final
- Champions: (Italy) Stefano Pescosolido (Italy) Laurence Tieleman
- Runners-up: (Denmark) Kenneth Carlsen (Netherlands) Sjeng Schalken
- Score: 7–5, 4–6, 7–5

Events
Singles	Doubles
← 1997 ·	President's Cup	· 1999 →

The 1998 President's Cup was a men's tennis tournament played on Hard in Tashkent, Uzbekistan that was part of the International Series of the 1998 ATP Tour. It was the second edition of the tournament and was held from 14 September – 20 September.

== Seeds ==
Champion seeds are indicated in bold text while text in italics indicates the round in which those seeds were eliminated.

1. (South Africa) Neville Godwin / (Finland) Tuomas Ketola (first round)
2. (Germany) Karsten Braasch / (Argentina) Gastón Etlis (quarterfinals)
3. (Czech Republic) Petr Luxa / (Israel) Eyal Ran (first round)
4. (United Kingdom) Tim Henman / (United Kingdom) Andrew Richardson (quarterfinals)

== Draw ==
=== Key ===
- Q = Qualifier
- WC = Wild card
- LL = Lucky loser
- Alt = Alternate
- SE = Special exempt
- PR = Protected ranking
- ITF = ITF entry
- JE = Junior exempt
- w/o = Walkover
- r = Retired
- d = Defaulted
- SR = Special ranking

=== Finals ===
First round
1	(South Africa) N Godwin (Finland) T Ketola	**6**	4	3
(Israel) **A Hadad** **(Israel) H Levy**	4	**6**	**6**
WC	(Russia) **K Ivanov-Smolensky** **(Uzbekistan) D Tomashevich**	4	**6**	**6**
Q	(Uzbekistan) A-H Makhkamov (Belarus) K Zinchenko	**6**	3	4
4	(United Kingdom) **T Henman** **(United Kingdom) A Richardson**	**6**	**6**
WC	(Uzbekistan) V Bistryavichus (Uzbekistan) T Ganiev	1	2
(Italy) **S Pescosolido** **(Italy) L Tieleman**	4	**7**	**6**
(France) N Escudé (Switzerland) M Rosset	**6**	5	4
(Denmark) **K Carlsen** **(Netherlands) S Schalken**	6	**7**	**7**
(Uzbekistan) O Ogorodov (Russia) M Safin	**7**	6	6
(Germany) **L Burgsmüller** **(Germany) R Schüttler**	**6**	**6**
3	(Czech Republic) P Luxa (Israel) E Ran	4	2
WC	(Uzbekistan) **V Kutsenko** **(Israel) N Welgreen**	3	**6**	**7**
(South Africa) D Nainkin (Netherlands) R Wassen	**6**	1	5
2	(Germany) **K Braasch** **(Argentina) G Etlis**	**7**	**7**
(Israel) E Erlich (Belarus) V Voltchkov	6	5

Quarterfinals
(Israel) **A Hadad** **(Israel) H Levy**	**6**	3	**6**
WC	(Russia) K Ivanov-Smolensky (Uzbekistan) D Tomashevich	2	**6**	4
4	(United Kingdom) T Henman (United Kingdom) A Richardson	1	4
(Italy) **S Pescosolido** **(Italy) L Tieleman**	**6**	**6**
(Denmark) **K Carlsen** **(Netherlands) S Schalken**	**6**	**6**
(Germany) L Burgsmüller (Germany) R Schüttler	4	0
(Uzbekistan) **V Kutsenko** **(Israel) N Welgreen**	**6**	4	**6**
2	(Germany) K Braasch (Argentina) G Etlis	2	**6**	3

Semifinals
(Israel) A Hadad (Israel) H Levy	**6**	3	4
(Italy) **S Pescosolido** **(Italy) L Tieleman**	4	**6**	**6**
(Denmark) **K Carlsen** **(Netherlands) S Schalken**	**6**	**6**
(Uzbekistan) V Kutsenko (Israel) N Welgreen	4	2

Final
(Italy) **S Pescosolido** **(Italy) L Tieleman**	**7**	4	**7**
(Denmark) K Carlsen (Netherlands) S Schalken	5	**6**	5
