= 1998 President's Cup (tennis) =

- Date: 14–20 September
- Edition: 2nd
- Category: International Series
- Draw: 32S / 16D
- Prize money: $380,000
- Surface: Hard / outdoor
- Location: Tashkent, Uzbekistan

Champions

Singles
- (United Kingdom) Tim Henman

Doubles
- (Italy) Stefano Pescosolido / (Italy) Laurence Tieleman
← 1997 ·	ATP Tashkent Open	· 1999 →

The 1998 President's Cup was a men's tennis tournament played on Hard in Tashkent, Uzbekistan that was part of the International Series of the 1998 ATP Tour. It was the second edition of the tournament and was held from 14 September – 20 September.

== Finals ==
=== Singles ===
(United Kingdom) Tim Henman defeated (Russia) Yevgeny Kafelnikov, 7–5, 6–4

=== Doubles ===
(Italy) Stefano Pescosolido / (Italy) Laurence Tieleman defeated (Denmark) Kenneth Carlsen / (Netherlands) Sjeng Schalken, 7–5, 4–6, 7–5
