= Israel Tennis Association =

Governing body for tennis in Israel

- Sport: Tennis
- Jurisdiction: National
- Abbreviation: (ITA)
- Affiliation: International Tennis Federation
- Regional affiliation: Tennis Europe

Official website
- www.ita.co.il
- (Israel)

The Israel Tennis Association (the ITA; Hebrew: איגוד הטניס בישראל), founded in 1950, is the national governing body for the sport of tennis in Israel. The ITA governs the arrangements for Israeli tennis leagues and tournaments, Israel's Davis Cup participation, and Israeli participation in tennis tournaments abroad. It has a history of stormy relationships with some of Israel's top players and the Israel Tennis Centers.

== 1980–88: Chairman Harnik I ==
David "Dedi" Harnik was chairman of the ITA from 1980 to 1988.

== 1988–90: State of turbulence ==
Kollie Friedstein, also the executive director of the Israel Tennis Centers ("ITC") and one of the founders of Kibbutz Shoval in the Negev, become chairman of the ITA in 1988 for a 2-year period, at which time "a state of turbulence" existed between the ITA and the ITC. Appointed to head both bodies at the same time, Friedstein felt that by 1990 he had succeeded in bringing "industrial peace" between them.

== 1990: Chairman Harnik II ==
In October 1990 Harnik was re-elected chairman of the ITA, a position that he held for many years.

== 1996: Mansdorf dispute ==
In early 1996, Amos Mansdorf got into a tiff with the ITA when he accused it of mismanagement, suggesting that it was run in "an amateur fashion".

== 2005: Dispute with Davis Cup players ==
In 2005, at the peak of a disagreement between the Israeli Davis Cup players and the ITA, Eyal Ran was made Israeli Davis Cup captain. Ran spoke to the players and the association and settled the crisis.

== 2006: Return of pro tennis to Israel planned/cancelled ==
The ITA announced the return of professional tennis to Israel in 2006; the Anda Open high-level WTA tournament for top women players, featuring more than US$140,000 (NIS 643,000) in prize money. But the ITA cancelled the tournament in August 2006, citing the precarious security situation in the region. The ITA said the decision to cancel the event was taken after Sony Ericsson WTA Tour CEO Larry Scott wrote to them informing them that under the circumstances, the event could not be held. The 2007 tournament remained on the calendar.

== 2008 ==
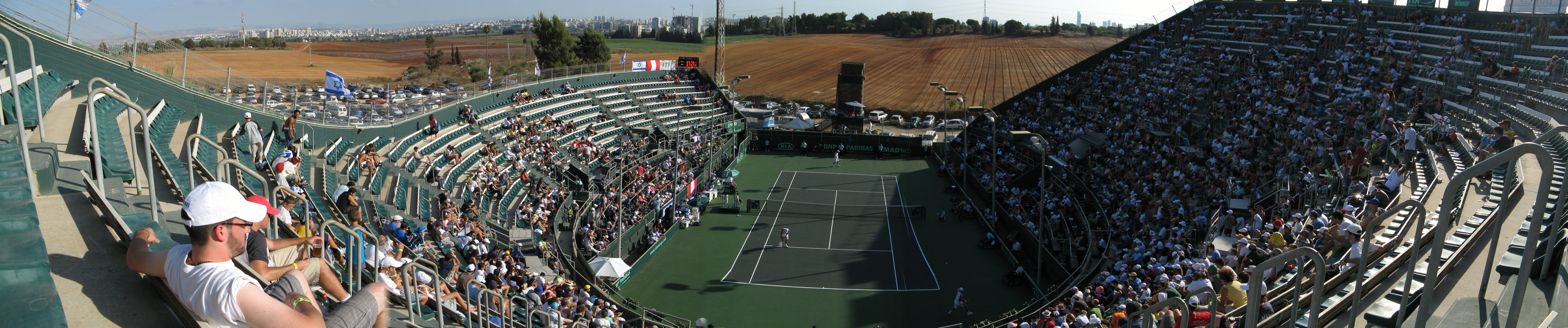
Canada Stadium in Ramat Hasharon; 2008

At the same time, the Israeli newspaper Haaretz was bringing the ITA and the Israeli Tennis Center to task for squabbling with each other to the detriment of the development of Israeli tennis.

In 2008 Israel's top singles player, Dudi Sela, was very angry at the Israeli Olympic Committee and the ITA which decided not to send him to the Olympics in Beijing. "It maddens me that I am not taking part in the Olympics," Sela said. "Everyone ranked in the top 100 will be there except for me. In the past some players ranked in the bottom 100 have even taken gold medals. But for Israel being ranked in the top 100 is not enough. Not since the days of former Israeli tennis player Amos Mansdorf has Israel been in the top tier of the Davis Cup, and I carried us there. After such an achievement they still don't appreciate me enough to send me to the Olympics. This has sapped my motivation to play in the next Davis Cup." He continued, "No one gets how mad I am at the Association. Who am I playing tennis for in the Davis Cup? For myself?"

The ITA ultimately sided with Sela, but was overruled by the Olympic Committee of Israel (OCI). The decision to leave Sela out enraged the ITA, which appealed immediately, to no avail. The director of Israel's Elite Sport Department, Gilad Lustig, had no regrets of the OCI's decision, and put the blame in part on the ITA. "We set the criteria after a very long process and all the different associations, including the ITA, gave their approval," he maintained.

== 2009: Ramat Hasharon vs. Nokia Stadium dispute ==
Over the protests of all four of their own players (including Harel Levy, who said: ""Only Ramat Hasharon. We're not even thinking about Nokia. There's no reason to play against the Russians indoors – we love Ramat Hasharon"), who preferred to play outdoors in the heat on the hard court of Canada Stadium in Ramat Hashoaron which they were accustomed to, the ITA moved the tie against Russia in 2009 to the larger indoor Nokia Stadium. But the ITA was sensitive to the fact that the indoor arena has a capacity of 11,000 – more than double that of the Canada Stadium. ITA CEO Moshe Haviv denied that his prime consideration was the extra money such a move would bring in, and said the larger stadium would give more Israelis the chance to see the national team play, and allow them to watch the sport in more comfortable conditions.

The Israel Tennis Center (ITC) turning to the Tel Aviv District Court in an effort to prevent the ITA from playing the matches at the Nokia Stadium rather than the Canada Stadium in Ramat Hasharon, claiming that the previous ITA chairman, Assaf Hefetz, had given the ITA a written guarantee that future Davis Cup and Fed Cup ties would be played at Ramat Hasharon after the ITC renovated the venue in 2008. The court ruled in favor of the ITA, however, after the sides failed to reach a compromise as Judge Yehuda Fargo had suggested. "The stadium at Ramat Hasharon doesn't fit the requirements for such a world class event, and therefore it is better off to play at Nokia," said Fargo. "I think this is the wrong decision," ITC CEO Janine Strauss said. "It was important for the players to play at Ramat Hasharon."
