= ATP Tashkent Open =

Defunct tennis tournament
- Event name: President's Cup
- Tour: ATP Tour
- Founded: 1997
- Abolished: 2002
- Editions: 6
- Location: Tashkent, Uzbekistan
- Venue: Yunusobod Sport Complex
- Surface: Hard / outdoor

The ATP Tashkent Open is a defunct ATP Tour affiliated men's tennis tournament played from 1997 to 2002. It was held in Tashkent in Uzbekistan and was played on outdoor hard courts.

Although no ATP 250 level tournaments have been played in Tashkent since then, there has been, since 2008, a Challenger event played in Tashkent, the Tashkent Challenger.

== Finals ==
=== Singles ===
| Year | Champions | Runners-up | Score |
|---|---|---|---|
| 1997 | (United Kingdom) Tim Henman | (Switzerland) Marc Rosset | 7–6, 6–4 |
| 1998 | (United Kingdom) Tim Henman | (Russia) Yevgeny Kafelnikov | 7–5, 6–4 |
| 1999 | (Germany) Nicolas Kiefer | (Switzerland) George Bastl | 6–4, 6–2 |
| 2000 | (Russia) Marat Safin | (Italy) Davide Sanguinetti | 6–3, 6–4 |
| 2001 | (Russia) Marat Safin | (Russia) Yevgeny Kafelnikov | 6–2, 6–2 |
| 2002 | (Russia) Yevgeny Kafelnikov | (Belarus) Vladimir Voltchkov | 7–6^{(8–6)}, 7–5 |

=== Doubles ===
| Year | Champions | Runners-up | Score |
|---|---|---|---|
| 1997 | (Italy) Vincenzo Santopadre (United States) Vince Spadea | (Morocco) Hicham Arazi (Israel) Eyal Ran | 6–4, 6–7, 6–0 |
| 1998 | (Italy) Stefano Pescosolido (Italy) Laurence Tieleman | (Denmark) Kenneth Carlsen (Netherlands) Sjeng Schalken | 7–5, 4–6, 7–5 |
| 1999 | (Uzbekistan) Oleg Ogorodov (Switzerland) Marc Rosset | (United States) Mark Keil (Switzerland) Lorenzo Manta | 7–6, 7–6 |
| 2000 | (United States) Justin Gimelstob (United States) Scott Humphries | (South Africa) Marius Barnard (South Africa) Robbie Koenig | 6–3, 6–2 |
| 2001 | (France) Julien Boutter (Slovakia) Dominik Hrbatý | (South Africa) Marius Barnard (United States) Jim Thomas | 6–4, 3–6, [13–11] |
| 2002 | (South Africa) David Adams (South Africa) Robbie Koenig | (Netherlands) Raemon Sluiter (Netherlands) Martin Verkerk | 6–2, 7–5 |

== See also ==
- Tashkent Open – Women's tennis tournament
