= Stefano Pescosolido =

Italian tennis player

- Country (sports): Italy
- Residence: Rome, Italy
- Born: 13 June 1971 (age 54) Sora, Italy
- Height: 1.85 m (6 ft 1 in)
- Turned pro: 1989
- Retired: 2006
- Plays: Right-handed (one-handed backhand)
- Prize money: $1,657,671

Singles
- Career record: 109–159
- Career titles: 2
- Highest ranking: No. 42 (2 March 1992)

Grand Slam singles results
- Australian Open: 3R (1995)
- French Open: 3R (1993)
- Wimbledon: 2R (1996, 1998, 2004)
- US Open: 2R (1991, 1992, 1995)

Other tournaments
- Olympic Games: 1R (1996)

Doubles
- Career record: 50–72
- Career titles: 1
- Highest ranking: No. 102 (11 January 1999)

Grand Slam doubles results
- Australian Open: 1R (1992)
- French Open: 2R (1996)
- Wimbledon: 2R (1999, 2000)
- US Open: 1R (1996)
- Last updated on: 23 May 2022.

Stefano Pescosolido (Italian pronunciation: [ˈsteːfano ˌpɛskoˈsɔːlido, - pes-]; born 13 June 1971) is a tennis coach and a former professional player from Italy. He reached his career-high ATP singles ranking of World No. 42 in March 1992.

He represented his native country at the 1996 Summer Olympics in Atlanta, where he was defeated in the first round by Brazil's Fernando Meligeni. The right-hander won two career titles in singles and one in doubles.

== ATP career finals ==
=== Singles: 2 (2 titles) ===
Legend Grand Slam Tournaments (0–0) ATP World Tour Finals (0–0) ATP Masters Series (0–0) ATP Championship Series (0–0) ATP World Series (2–0)	Finals by surface Hard (2–0) Clay (0–0) Grass (0–0) Carpet (0–0)	Finals by setting Outdoors (2–0) Indoors (0–0)

Result	W–L	Date	Tournament	Tier	Surface	Opponent	Score
Win	1–0	Mar 1992	Scottsdale, United States	World Series	Hard	(United States) Brad Gilbert	6–0, 1–6, 6–4
Win	2–0	Oct 1993	Tel Aviv, Israel	World Series	Hard	(Israel) Amos Mansdorf	7–6^{(7–5)}, 7–5

=== Doubles: 3 (1 title, 2 runner-ups) ===
Legend Grand Slam Tournaments (0–0) ATP World Tour Finals (0–0) ATP Masters Series (0–0) ATP Championship Series (0–1) ATP World Series (1–1)	Finals by surface Hard (1–1) Clay (0–0) Grass (0–0) Carpet (0–1)	Finals by setting Outdoors (1–1) Indoors (0–1)

Result	W–L	Date	Tournament	Tier	Surface	Partner	Opponents	Score
Loss	0–1	Feb 1997	Shanghai, China	World Series	Carpet	(Sweden) Tomas Nydahl	(Belarus) Max Mirnyi (Zimbabwe) Kevin Ullyett	6–7, 7–6, 5–7
Loss	0–1	Apr 1998	Tokyo, Japan	Championship Series	Hard	(France) Olivier Delaître	(Canada) Sébastien Lareau (Canada) Daniel Nestor	3–6, 4–6
Win	1–2	Sep 1998	Tashkent, Uzbekistan	World Series	Hard	(Italy) Laurence Tieleman	(Denmark) Kenneth Carlsen (Netherlands) Sjeng Schalken	7–5, 4–6, 7–5

== ATP Challenger and ITF Futures finals ==
=== Singles: 20 (10–10) ===
Legend ATP Challenger (7–8) ITF Futures (3–2)	Finals by surface Hard (4–4) Clay (5–3) Grass (1–2) Carpet (0–1)

Result	W–L	Date	Tournament	Tier	Surface	Opponent	Score
Win	1–0	May 1989	Parioli, Italy	Challenger	Clay	(Austria) Oliver Fuchs	6–1, 6–2
Loss	1–1	Sep 1990	Messina, Italy	Challenger	Clay	(Argentina) Guillermo Pérez Roldán	1–6, 3–6
Loss	1–2	Mar 1991	Le Gosier, Guadeloupe	Challenger	Hard	(France) Olivier Delaître	2–6, 6–7
Win	2–2	Apr 1991	Parioli, Italy	Challenger	Clay	(Belgium) Bart Wuyts	6–3, 6–4
Win	3–2	Apr 1991	Oporto, Portugal	Challenger	Clay	(Argentina) Roberto Azar	6–1, 6–1
Loss	3–3	Oct 1991	Siracusa, Italy	Challenger	Clay	(Spain) Carlos Costa	3–6, 6–7
Loss	3–4	Jul 1995	Braunschweig, Germany	Challenger	Clay	(Sweden) Magnus Gustafsson	6–4, 0–6, 6–7
Win	4–4	Jul 1997	Bristol, United Kingdom	Challenger	Grass	(United Kingdom) Mark Petchey	7–6, 7–6
Loss	4–5	Jul 1997	Manchester, United Kingdom	Challenger	Grass	(Spain) Óscar Burrieza-Lopez	6–7, 6–2, 1–6
Loss	4–6	Jul 1998	Manchester, United Kingdom	Challenger	Grass	(United Kingdom) Chris Wilkinson	3–6, 4–6
Win	5–6	Jul 1999	Olbia, Italy	Challenger	Hard	(Italy) Giorgio Galimberti	6–7, 6–4, 7–6
Loss	5–7	Feb 2000	Amarillo, United States	Challenger	Hard	(United States) Michael Russell	5–7, 2–6
Win	6–7	Sep 2001	Italy F11, Oristano	Futures	Hard	(France) Rodolphe Cadart	7–6^{(8–6)}, 7–6^{(7–4)}
Loss	6–8	Feb 2003	Great Britain F2, Nottingham	Futures	Carpet	(South Africa) Wesley Moodie	6–3, 6–7^{(3–7)}, 4–6
Loss	6–9	Feb 2003	Great Britain F4, Redbridge	Futures	Hard	(United States) Michael Joyce	4–6, 6–3, 2–6
Loss	6–10	Mar 2003	Wrexham, United Kingdom	Challenger	Hard	(South Africa) Wesley Moodie	4–6, 3–6
Win	7–10	Mar 2003	France F6, Lille	Futures	Hard	(Spain) Francisco Fogues-Domenech	6–3, 3–6, 6–4
Win	8–10	Apr 2003	Italy F3, Viterbo	Futures	Clay	(Russia) Igor Andreev	7–6^{(7–5)}, 6–3
Win	9–10	Jul 2003	Córdoba, Spain	Challenger	Hard	(France) Nicolas Mahut	6–4, 6–3
Win	10–10	Apr 2004	Olbia, Italy	Challenger	Clay	(Austria) Daniel Köllerer	6–1, 6–2

=== Doubles: 19 (10–9) ===
Legend ATP Challenger (7–9) ITF Futures (3–0)	Finals by surface Hard (4–4) Clay (4–3) Grass (1–0) Carpet (1–2)

Result	W–L	Date	Tournament	Tier	Surface	Partner	Opponents	Score
Loss	0–1	Apr 1990	Parioli, Italy	Challenger	Clay	(Italy) Nicola Bruno	(Czechoslovakia) Branislav Stankovic (Czechoslovakia) Richard Vogel	5–7, 3–6
Win	1–1	Jan 1991	Heilbronn, Germany	Challenger	Carpet	(Italy) Diego Nargiso	(Germany) Christian Saceanu (Netherlands) Michiel Schapers	6–2, 6–2
Win	2–1	Mar 1991	Marseille, France	Challenger	Clay	(Italy) Massimo Boscatto	(Netherlands) Tom Kempers (Netherlands) Tom Nijssen	6–2, 2–6, 6–3
Win	3–1	Apr 1991	Zaragoza, Spain	Challenger	Clay	(Italy) Massimo Cierro	(Spain) Juan-Carlos Baguena (Spain) David De Miguel-Lapiedra	6–2, 6–4
Loss	3–2	Oct 1991	Siracusa, Italy	Challenger	Clay	(Italy) Diego Nargiso	(Italy) Cristian Brandi (Italy) Massimo Cierro	6–3, 6–7, 6–7
Loss	3–3	Sep 1993	Budapest, Hungary	Challenger	Clay	(Italy) Massimo Valeri	(Belgium) Filip Dewulf (Belgium) Tom Vanhoudt	5–7, 3–6
Win	4–3	Sep 1995	Napoli, Italy	Challenger	Clay	(Italy) Vincenzo Santopadre	(United States) Kent Kinnear (United States) Jack Waite	6–1, 3–6, 6–3
Loss	4–4	Feb 1997	Cherbourg, France	Challenger	Hard	(Italy) Vincenzo Santopadre	(Belarus) Max Mirnyi (South Africa) Kevin Ullyett	3–6, 7–6, 4–6
Loss	4–5	Aug 1997	Olbia, Italy	Challenger	Hard	(Italy) Mosé Navarra	(United States) Geoff Grant (Venezuela) Maurice Ruah	6–3, 2–6, 5–7
Loss	4–6	Feb 1998	Heilbronn, Germany	Challenger	Carpet	(Italy) Vincenzo Santopadre	(United States) Geoff Grant (United States) Mark Merklein	3–6, 6–7
Win	5–6	Jul 1998	Manchester, United Kingdom	Challenger	Grass	(Italy) Mosé Navarra	(Australia) Wayne Arthurs (Australia) Ben Ellwood	6–1, 6–7, 7–6
Loss	5–7	Aug 1999	Madrid, Spain	Challenger	Hard	(United States) David Di Lucia	(Japan) Thomas Shimada (South Africa) Myles Wakefield	3–6, 6–7
Win	6–7	Sep 1999	France F12, Plaisir	Futures	Hard	(Russia) Andrei Stoliarov	(Japan) Yaoki Ishii (France) Arnaud L'Official	3–6, 6–3, 7–5
Loss	6–8	Feb 2000	Hull, United Kingdom	Challenger	Carpet	(Austria) Julian Knowle	(United Kingdom) Barry Cowan (South Africa) Neville Godwin	3–6, 6–3, 3–6
Loss	6–9	Mar 2000	Besançon, France	Challenger	Hard	(Italy) Vincenzo Santopadre	(France) Julien Boutter (France) Michaël Llodra	4–6, 7–6^{(8–6)}, 6–7^{(5–7)}
Win	7–9	Feb 2001	Great Britain F2, Glasgow	Futures	Hard	(Italy) Daniele Bracciali	(Poland) Tomasz Bonieck (Peru) Juan-Carlos Parker	1–6, 7–6^{(7–5)}, 6–4
Win	8–9	Jul 2002	Hilversum, Netherlands	Challenger	Clay	(Pakistan) Aisam Qureshi	(Hong Kong) John Hui (Australia) Anthony Ross	7–6^{(7–4)}, 6–0
Win	9–9	Aug 2002	Wrexham, United Kingdom	Challenger	Hard	(Italy) Gianluca Pozzi	(Italy) Daniele Bracciali (Pakistan) Aisam Qureshi	6–4, 6–4
Win	10–9	Jul 2006	Italy F24, Modena	Futures	Clay	(Italy) Matteo Fago	(New Zealand) Mikal Statham (New Zealand) José Statham	6–7^{(5–7)}, 6–1, 6–4

== Junior Grand Slam finals ==
=== Doubles: 1 (1 runner-up) ===
Result	Year	Tournament	Surface	Partner	Opponents	Score
Loss	1988	US Open	Hard	(Italy) Massimo Boscatto	(United States) Jonathan Stark (United States) John Yancey	6–7, 5–7

== Performance timelines ==
Key
W	F	SF	QF	#R	RR	Q#	DNQ	A	NH

(W) winner; (F) finalist; (SF) semifinalist; (QF) quarterfinalist; (#R) rounds 4, 3, 2, 1; (RR) round-robin stage; (Q#) qualification round; (DNQ) did not qualify; (A) absent; (NH) not held; (SR) strike rate (events won / competed); (W–L) win–loss record.

=== Singles ===
Tournament	1989	1990	1991	1992	1993	1994	1995	1996	1997	1998	1999	2000	2001	2002	2003	2004	SR	W–L	Win %
Grand Slam tournaments
Australian Open	A	2R	A	2R	A	2R	3R	1R	A	A	A	Q1	A	A	Q1	Q2	0 / 5	5–5	50%
French Open	A	A	A	1R	3R	2R	Q2	1R	Q1	Q2	Q1	Q1	Q1	A	Q1	Q1	0 / 4	3–4	43%
Wimbledon	A	A	1R	1R	A	1R	A	2R	Q1	2R	Q2	Q1	Q1	Q2	Q3	2R	0 / 6	3–6	33%
US Open	A	A	2R	2R	Q1	1R	2R	1R	A	Q3	Q3	A	Q1	Q1	Q3	A	0 / 5	3–5	38%
Win–loss	0–0	1–1	1–2	2–4	2–1	2–4	3–2	1–4	0–0	1–1	0–0	0–0	0–0	0–0	0–0	1–1	0 / 20	14–20	41%
National Representation
Summer Olympics	Not Held			A	Not Held			1R	Not Held			A	Not Held			A	0 / 1	0–1	0%
ATP Masters Series
Indian Wells	A	A	A	1R	1R	1R	A	Q1	A	A	A	A	A	A	A	A	0 / 3	0–3	0%
Miami	A	A	1R	1R	1R	1R	A	3R	A	A	A	A	A	A	A	A	0 / 5	2–5	29%
Monte Carlo	A	A	A	2R	A	2R	A	A	A	A	A	A	A	A	A	A	0 / 2	2–2	50%
Hamburg	A	A	A	3R	A	2R	A	2R	A	A	A	A	A	A	A	Q2	0 / 3	4–3	57%
Rome	1R	2R	2R	2R	1R	3R	1R	1R	1R	A	A	A	A	A	Q1	1R	0 / 10	5–10	33%
Canada	A	A	3R	A	A	2R	A	A	A	A	A	A	A	A	A	A	0 / 2	3–2	60%
Cincinnati	A	A	1R	1R	Q2	1R	A	1R	A	A	A	A	A	A	Q1	A	0 / 4	0–4	0%
Paris	A	A	A	1R	A	A	A	Q3	A	A	A	A	A	A	A	A	0 / 1	0–1	0%
Win–loss	0–1	1–1	3–4	4–7	0–3	5–7	0–1	3–4	0–1	0–0	0–0	0–0	0–0	0–0	0–0	0–1	0 / 30	16–30	35%

=== Doubles ===
Tournament	1989	1990	1991	1992	1993	1994	1995	1996	1997	1998	1999	2000	2001	2002	2003	2004	SR	W–L	Win %
Grand Slam tournaments
Australian Open	A	A	A	1R	A	A	A	A	A	A	A	A	A	A	A	A	0 / 1	0–1	0%
French Open	A	A	A	A	A	A	A	2R	A	A	A	A	A	A	A	A	0 / 1	1–1	50%
Wimbledon	A	A	1R	A	A	A	A	A	A	Q1	2R	2R	Q1	A	A	A	0 / 3	2–3	40%
US Open	A	A	A	A	A	A	A	1R	A	A	A	A	A	A	A	A	0 / 1	0–1	0%
Win–loss	0–0	0–0	0–1	0–1	0–0	0–0	0–0	1–2	0–0	0–0	1–1	1–1	0–0	0–0	0–0	0–0	0 / 6	3–6	33%
ATP Masters Series
Miami	A	A	A	1R	A	A	A	Q1	A	A	A	A	A	A	A	A	0 / 1	0–1	0%
Monte Carlo	A	A	A	A	A	Q1	A	A	A	A	A	A	A	A	A	A	0 / 0	0–0	–
Rome	1R	1R	A	1R	1R	1R	1R	A	Q1	A	A	1R	A	A	A	1R	0 / 8	0–8	0%
Canada	A	A	2R	A	A	1R	A	A	A	A	A	A	A	A	A	A	0 / 2	1–2	33%
Cincinnati	A	A	A	1R	A	Q1	A	A	A	A	A	A	A	A	A	A	0 / 1	0–1	0%
Win–loss	0–1	0–1	1–1	0–3	0–1	0–2	0–1	0–0	0–0	0–0	0–0	0–1	0–0	0–0	0–0	0–1	0 / 12	1–12	8%
