= Vince Spadea =

American tennis player

Vincent Spadea
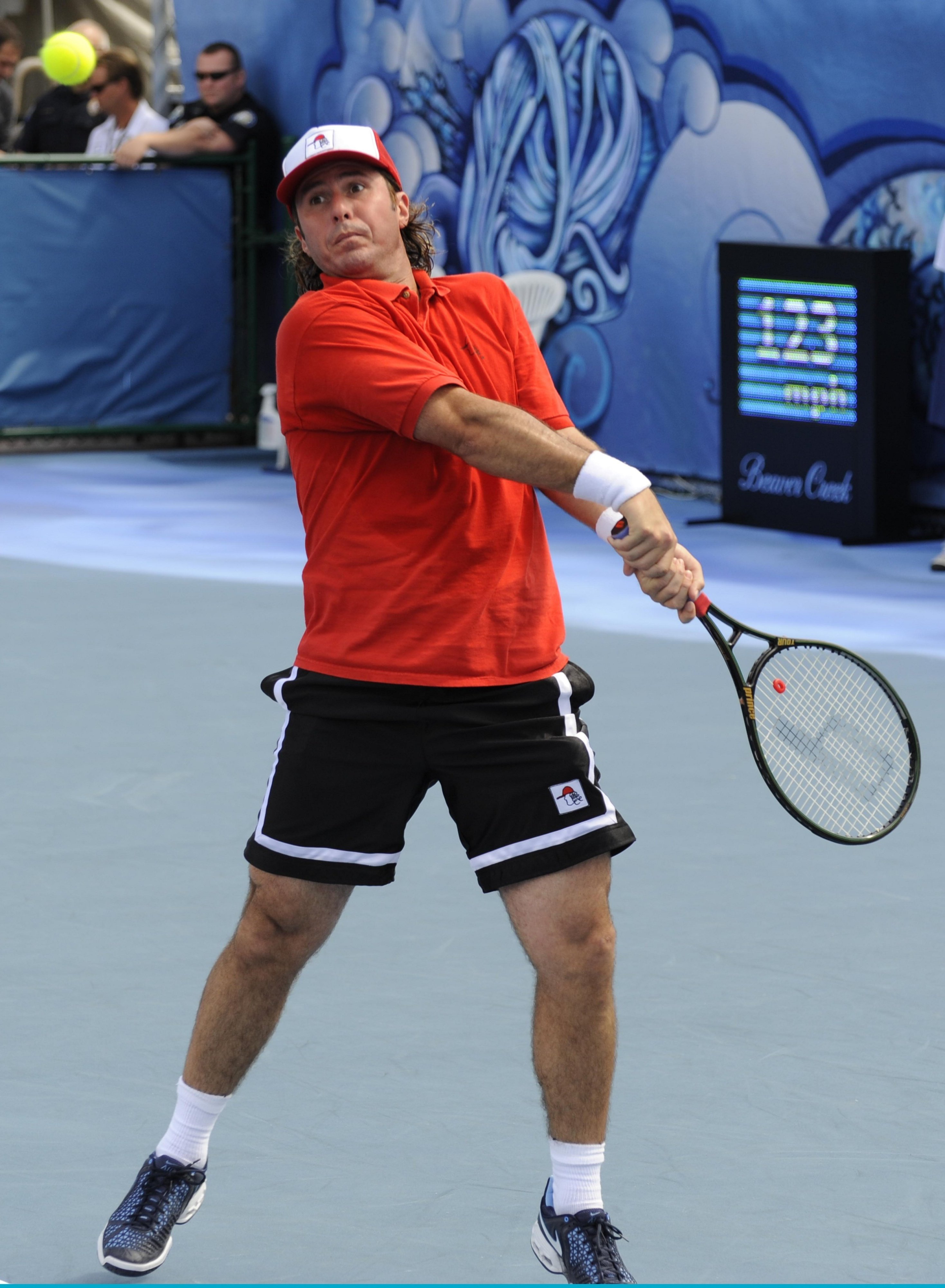
- Spadea, 2009 at Delray Beach International Championships
- Country (sports): United States
- Residence: Boca Raton, Florida, US
- Born: July 19, 1974 (age 51); Chicago, Illinois, US
- Height: 6 ft 0 in (1.83 m)
- Turned pro: 1993
- Retired: 2011
- Plays: Right-handed (two-handed backhand)
- Prize money: $5,004,860

Singles
- Career record: 311–359
- Career titles: 1
- Highest ranking: No. 18 (28 February 2005)

Grand Slam singles results
- Australian Open: QF (1999)
- French Open: 3R (1999, 2002, 2003)
- Wimbledon: 4R (2004)
- US Open: 4R (1995, 1999)

Other tournaments
- Grand Slam Cup: 1R (1999)
- Olympic Games: 2R (2004)

Doubles
- Career record: 65–114
- Career titles: 3
- Highest ranking: No. 90 (12 June 2006)

Grand Slam doubles results
- Australian Open: 2R (2006, 2007)
- French Open: 3R (2006)
- Wimbledon: 3R (2004)
- US Open: 3R (2005)

Grand Slam mixed doubles results
- Wimbledon: 2R (2007)
- US Open: QF (2003, 2006)
- Last updated on: 17 October 2021.

Vincent Spadea (born July 19, 1974) is a former professional tennis player from the United States.

He reached a career high tenth position in the ATP Champions Race in April 2003, as well as a career-high 18th ATP ranking in February 2005. He has career prize money earnings of over $5,000,000. Spadea has ATP career singles wins over Roger Federer (1–2 record), Pete Sampras (1–4), Andre Agassi (2–4), Rafael Nadal (1–1), Andy Roddick (1–2), Pat Rafter, Richard Krajicek, Yevgeny Kafelnikov, Jim Courier, Michael Chang, Marat Safin, and Gustavo Kuerten. He is one of five players to defeat Federer 6–0 in a set at a main tour tournament, which he did at 1999 Monte Carlo. Spadea represented the United States at the 2000 and 2004 Olympics. Vince was also named twice to the US Davis Cup Team in 2000 (captain John McEnroe) and 2004 (captain Patrick McEnroe).

Spadea has one career ATP singles title and three ATP doubles titles. He also has eleven USTA Challenger Pro singles titles.

== Personal life ==
Spadea was born in Chicago in 1974. His mother is originally from Colombia.

Spadea was Steve Carell's body double as Bobby Riggs in the 2017 film Battle of the Sexes.

== Tennis career ==
At the 1999 Australian Open, Spadea achieved his best performance in a major by reaching the quarterfinals. In the fourth round at that tournament, he defeated the 1995 Australian Open champion, Andre Agassi. Spadea then lost to Tommy Haas in the quarterfinals.

On September 13, 1999, Spadea achieved a top 20 ranking for the first time. However, from October 1999 to June 2000, Spadea suffered a record losing run of 21 losses in a row. His losing streak led the Associated Press to dub him "the Charlie Brown of tennis" . He ended the streak in the first round of 2000 Wimbledon with an opening round 6–3, 6–7, 6–3, 6–7, 9–7 win over 14th seed Greg Rusedski, in a five-set marathon, which lasted for nearly four hours. Spadea's world ranking fell as low as 237 on October 23, 2000.

Working hard on the Challenger Tour after his fall down the rankings, he successfully recovered and eventually won his only career ATP Tour singles title in Scottsdale, Arizona, where he defeated James Blake and Andy Roddick along the way in 2004. He continued his journey back up the world rankings and was back in the top 20 by late 2004, although US Davis Cup captain, Patrick McEnroe, declined to pick Spadea as his second singles player for the 2004 Davis Cup final against Spain, opting instead for the lower ranked Mardy Fish. Spadea achieved his career-high world ranking of 18 in February 2005.

In 2003, Spadea reached the semifinals of a Masters event in Indian Wells for the first time in his career, losing to world No. 1, Lleyton Hewitt. He went on to the Monte Carlo Masters a month later and reached his second semifinals in a Masters series. This helped him reach a career high position of No. 10 in the ATP Champions Race in April.

In 2006, Spadea published his autobiographical book, Break Point: The Secret Diary of a Pro Tennis Player. Spadea criticized a number of tennis players including James Blake and Davis Cup captain Patrick McEnroe. He called out McEnroe for picking Mardy Fish ahead of him for the 2004 Davis Cup final where the Americans lost to Spain. Spadea criticized Blake for questionable character during a match where Blake allegedly "trash-talked" him. The book reached the top of the ranks in sports and tennis books during its debut month.

Spadea reached the third round at the 2008 Australian Open. In the first round, he came back from two sets down to defeat former world No. 8, Radek Štěpánek. He closed the season by winning two Challenger titles, in Waco and Calabasas.

Vince had an injury-stricken season in 2009, plagued by an overuse tendonitis arm issue, as well as a lower extremity staph infection. He won only a handful of ATP-level singles matches before the start of the clay-court season, but reached the semifinals of the Carson Challenger.

The New York Times summarized his career by calling him "the epitome of a tennis journeyman" and then noted that "he has played in 15 US Opens and has never reached the quarterfinals."

== ATP career finals ==
=== Singles: 5 (1 title, 4 runner-ups) ===
Legend Grand Slam Tournaments (0–0) ATP World Tour Finals (0–0) ATP World Tour Masters 1000 (0–0) ATP International Series Gold (0–1) ATP International Series (1–3)	Finals by surface Hard (1–2) Clay (0–1) Grass (0–1) Carpet (0–0)	Finals by setting Outdoors (1–4) Indoors (0–0)

Result	W–L	Date	Tournament	Tier	Surface	Opponent	Score
Loss	0–1	May 1998	St. Pölten, Austria	World Series	Clay	(Chile) Marcelo Ríos	2–6, 0–6
Loss	0–2	Aug 1999	Indianapolis, United States	International Series Gold	Hard	(Ecuador) Nicolás Lapentti	6–4, 4–6, 4–6
Win	1–2	Mar 2004	Scottsdale, United States	International Series	Hard	(Germany) Nicolas Kiefer	7–5, 6–7^{(5–7)}, 6–3
Loss	1–3	Sep 2004	Delray Beach, United States	International Series	Hard	(Brazil) Ricardo Mello	6–7^{(2–7)}, 3–6
Loss	1–4	Jul 2005	Newport, United States	International Series	Grass	(United Kingdom) Greg Rusedski	6–7^{(3–7)}, 6–2, 4–6

=== Doubles: 5 (3 titles, 2 runners-up) ===
Legend Grand Slam tournaments (0–0) ATP World Tour Finals (0–0) ATP Masters Series (0–0) ATP Championship Series Gold (0–0) ATP World Series (3–2)	Finals by surface Hard (1–0) Clay (2–2) Grass (0–0) Carpet (0–0)	Finals by setting Outdoor (3–2) Indoor (0–0)

Result	W–L	Date	Tournament	Tier	Surface	Partner	Opponents	Score
Loss	0–1	May 1995	Bologna, Italy	World Series	Clay	(Czech Republic) Libor Pimek	(Zimbabwe) Byron Black (United States) Jonathan Stark	5–7, 3–6
Win	1–1	Nov 1995	Buenos Aires, Argentina	World Series	Clay	(South Africa) Christo van Rensburg	(Czech Republic) Jiří Novák (Czech Republic) David Rikl	6–3, 6–3
Win	2–1	Apr 1997	Orlando, United States	World Series	Clay	(The Bahamas) Mark Merklein	(United States) Alex O'Brien (United States) Jeff Salzenstein	6–4, 4–6, 6–4
Win	3–1	Sep 1997	Tashkent, Uzbekistan	World Series	Hard	(Italy) Vincenzo Santopadre	(Morocco) Hicham Arazi (Israel) Eyal Ran	6–4, 6–7, 6–0
Loss	3–2	May 1998	Coral Springs, United States	World Series	Clay	(The Bahamas) Mark Merklein	(South Africa) Grant Stafford (South Africa) Kevin Ullyett	5–7, 4–6

== ATP Challenger and ITF Futures finals ==
=== Singles: 14 (8–6) ===
Legend ATP Challenger (8–6) ITF Futures (0–0)	Finals by surface Hard (8–5) Clay (0–1) Grass (0–0) Carpet (0–0)

Result	W–L	Date	Tournament	Tier	Surface	Opponent	Score
Win	1–0	Jul 1994	Winnetka, United States	Challenger	Hard	(Italy) Cristiano Caratti	6–1, 4–6, 7–5
Win	2–0	Aug 1994	Cincinnati, United States	Challenger	Hard	(United States) Jim Grabb	6–7, 7–6, 7–5
Win	3–0	Oct 1994	Ponte Vedra, United States	Challenger	Hard	(South Africa) Kevin Ullyett	6–3, 6–4
Win	4–0	Sep 1996	Aruba, Aruba	Challenger	Hard	(South Africa) Grant Stafford	6–3, 7–5
Loss	4–1	Oct 2001	Tulsa, United States	Challenger	Hard	(Czech Republic) Jan Hernych	5–7, 5–7
Win	5–1	Oct 2001	Houston, United States	Challenger	Hard	(United States) James Blake	6–2, 6–7^{(3–7)}, 6–2
Loss	5–2	Nov 2001	Burbank, United States	Challenger	Hard	(United States) Kevin Kim	2–6, 4–6
Loss	5–3	Nov 2001	Tyler, United States	Challenger	Hard	(Israel) Noam Okun	5–7, 2–6
Win	6–3	Mar 2002	North Miami Beach, United States	Challenger	Hard	(Czech Republic) Ota Fukárek	4–6, 6–1, 6–4
Loss	6–4	Apr 2002	Paget, Bermuda	Challenger	Clay	(Brazil) Flávio Saretta	3–6, 5–7
Loss	6–5	Jun 2008	Waikoloa, United States	Challenger	Hard	(Chinese Taipei) Lu Yen-hsun	2–6, 0–6
Loss	6–6	Sep 2008	Tulsa, United States	Challenger	Hard	(United States) Kevin Kim	3–6, 6–3, 4–6
Win	7–6	Sep 2008	Waco, United States	Challenger	Hard	(Australia) Joseph Sirianni	6–0, 6–1
Win	8–6	Oct 2008	Calabasas, United States	Challenger	Hard	(United States) Sam Warburg	7–6^{(7–5)}, 6–4

== Performance timelines ==
Key
W	F	SF	QF	#R	RR	Q#	DNQ	A	NH

(W) winner; (F) finalist; (SF) semifinalist; (QF) quarterfinalist; (#R) rounds 4, 3, 2, 1; (RR) round-robin stage; (Q#) qualification round; (DNQ) did not qualify; (A) absent; (NH) not held; (SR) strike rate (events won / competed); (W–L) win–loss record.

== Singles ==
Tournament	1992	1993	1994	1995	1996	1997	1998	1999	2000	2001	2002	2003	2004	2005	2006	2007	2008	2009	2010	SR	W–L	Win %
Grand Slam tournaments
Australian Open	A	A	Q1	3R	2R	A	3R	QF	1R	A	Q2	1R	1R	1R	1R	2R	3R	1R	A	0 / 12	12–12	50%
French Open	A	A	A	1R	1R	1R	2R	3R	1R	Q1	3R	3R	2R	2R	1R	1R	1R	A	A	0 / 13	9–13	41%
Wimbledon	A	A	Q2	1R	1R	1R	2R	1R	2R	A	2R	1R	4R	1R	1R	1R	1R	2R	A	0 / 14	7–14	33%
US Open	Q1	1R	2R	4R	3R	1R	1R	4R	1R	Q3	2R	1R	2R	2R	3R	1R	1R	Q1	A	0 / 15	14–15	48%
Win–loss	0–0	0–1	1–1	5–4	3–4	0–3	4–4	9–4	1–4	0–0	4–3	2–4	5–4	2–4	2–4	1–4	2–4	1–2	0–0	0 / 54	42–54	44%
ATP Masters Series
Indian Wells	A	A	Q2	1R	A	1R	2R	1R	1R	A	A	SF	3R	2R	2R	2R	1R	1R	Q1	0 / 12	8–12	40%
Miami	A	2R	2R	3R	QF	3R	3R	4R	2R	Q1	Q2	2R	SF	3R	2R	2R	1R	Q2	A	0 / 14	24–14	63%
Monte Carlo	A	A	A	A	A	A	A	QF	1R	A	A	SF	1R	1R	A	A	A	A	A	0 / 5	7–5	58%
Hamburg	A	A	A	1R	A	A	A	A	1R	A	Q1	1R	1R	1R	Q1	A	A	NMS		0 / 5	0–5	0%
Rome	A	A	A	2R	A	A	A	2R	1R	A	1R	1R	QF	A	Q1	Q1	A	A	A	0 / 6	5–6	45%
Canada	A	A	A	A	A	2R	3R	3R	A	Q2	2R	3R	2R	1R	Q1	Q1	A	A	A	0 / 7	9–7	56%
Cincinnati	A	Q1	A	2R	2R	3R	QF	1R	1R	Q2	Q2	1R	1R	1R	2R	1R	A	A	A	0 / 11	8–11	42%
Madrid^{1}	A	A	A	A	A	A	1R	1R	A	A	Q2	3R	3R	1R	Q1	Q1	A	A	A	0 / 5	3–5	38%
Paris	A	A	A	A	A	A	3R	1R	A	A	Q1	1R	3R	1R	1R	1R	A	A	A	0 / 7	3–7	30%
Win–loss	0–0	1–1	1–1	4–5	5–2	5–4	10–6	9–8	0–6	0–0	1–2	13–9	12–9	1–8	3–4	2–4	0–2	0–1	0–0	0 / 72	67–72	48%
Year-end ranking	0	303	75	81	54	88	42	20	213	125	67	29	20	75	73	77	76	295	1517	Prize Money: $5,004,860		

== Doubles ==
Tournament	1992	1993	1994	1995	1996	1997	1998	1999	2000	2001	2002	2003	2004	2005	2006	2007	2008	2009	SR	W–L	Win %
Grand Slam tournaments
Australian Open	A	A	A	A	1R	A	A	A	A	A	A	A	1R	1R	2R	2R	A	1R	0 / 6	2–6	25%
French Open	A	A	A	A	2R	A	A	A	A	A	A	A	A	2R	3R	1R	A	A	0 / 4	4–4	100%
Wimbledon	A	A	A	A	A	A	A	A	A	A	A	1R	3R	A	1R	A	A	A	0 / 3	2–3	40%
US Open	1R	1R	1R	A	1R	1R	1R	A	A	A	1R	1R	1R	3R	A	2R	A	A	0 / 11	3–11	21%
Win–loss	0–1	0–1	0–1	0–0	1–3	0–1	0–1	0–0	0–0	0–0	0–1	0–2	2–3	3–3	3–3	2–3	0–0	0–1	0 / 24	11–24	31%
ATP Masters Series
Indian Wells	A	A	A	A	A	A	A	A	A	A	A	A	A	1R	A	A	A	A	0 / 1	0–1	0%
Miami	A	A	A	Q2	Q1	A	A	A	A	1R	A	A	A	A	A	A	A	A	0 / 1	0–1	0%
Rome	A	A	A	1R	A	A	A	A	A	A	A	A	A	A	A	A	A	A	0 / 1	0–1	0%
Canada	A	A	A	A	A	Q1	A	A	A	A	A	A	A	A	A	A	A	A	0 / 0	0–0	–
Cincinnati	A	A	A	1R	A	Q1	A	A	A	A	A	A	A	A	A	A	A	A	0 / 1	0–1	0%
Win–loss	0–0	0–0	0–0	0–2	0–0	0–0	0–0	0–0	0–0	0–1	0–0	0–0	0–0	0–1	0–0	0–0	0–0	0–0	0 / 4	0–4	0%

^{1}This event was held in Stockholm through 1994, Essen in 1995, and Stuttgart from 1996 through 2001.

== Top 10 wins ==
Season	1993	1994	1995	1996	1997	1998	1999	2000	2001	2002	2003	2004	2005	2006	2007	2008	2009	2010	Total
Wins	0	0	1	1	1	4	8	0	0	1	0	4	0	0	1	0	0	0	21

#	Player	Rank	Event	Surface	Rd	Score	SR
1995
1.	(Russia) Yevgeny Kafelnikov	7	US Open, New York	Hard	3R	6–2, 6–4, 6–4	80
1996
2.	(Sweden) Thomas Enqvist	9	Miami, United States	Hard	2R	6–3, 7–5	90
1997
3.	(Sweden) Thomas Enqvist	7	Cincinnati, United States	Hard	2R	6–7^{(1–7)}, 6–3, 6–3	95
1998
4.	(Australia) Pat Rafter	4	Miami, United States	Hard	2R	6–3, 7–5	64
5.	(Czech Republic) Petr Korda	3	Toronto, Canada	Hard	2R	5–7, 6–1, 6–4	44
6.	(United States) Andre Agassi	9	Cincinnati, United States	Hard	2R	6–2, 0–6, 7–6^{(7–2)}	44
7.	(Netherlands) Richard Krajicek	8	Cincinnati, United States	Hard	3R	6–2, 6–3	44
1999
8.	(United States) Andre Agassi	6	Australian Open, Melbourne	Hard	4R	6–1, 7–5, 6–7^{(3–7)}, 6–3	44
9.	(Russia) Yevgeny Kafelnikov	3	Miami, United States	Hard	2R	6–7^{(6–8)}, 7–6^{(7–4)}, 6–2	41
10.	(Slovakia) Karol Kučera	9	Monte Carlo, Monaco	Clay	2R	6–4, 6–3	33
11.	(Australia) Mark Philippoussis	9	Rome, Italy	Clay	1R	7–6^{(7–2)}, 4–6, 6–1	27
12.	(Netherlands) Richard Krajicek	5	French Open, Paris	Clay	2R	6–1, 6–2, 6–4	35
13.	(Brazil) Gustavo Kuerten	5	Gstaad, Switzerland	Clay	2R	6–2, 2–6, 7–6^{(8–6)}	29
14.	(United States) Pete Sampras	1	Indianapolis, United States	Hard	QF	6–4, 3–6, ret.	34
15.	(Russia) Yevgeny Kafelnikov	2	Lyon, France	Carpet (i)	QF	6–2, 3–6, 7–6^{(7–5)}	22
2002
16.	(Spain) Albert Costa	7	Toronto, Canada	Hard	1R	6–3, 6–1	74
2004
17.	(United States) Andy Roddick	3	Scottsdale, United States	Hard	SF	6–7^{(5–7)}, 6–3, 6–4	29
18.	(Thailand) Paradorn Srichaphan	10	Miami, United States	Hard	4R	5–7, 6–3, 6–2	36
19.	(Germany) Rainer Schüttler	5	Rome, Italy	Clay	1R	6–2, 2–6, 7–5	34
20.	(Germany) Rainer Schüttler	8	Wimbledon, London	Grass	3R	6–4, 6–2, 6–3	30
2007
21.	(Germany) Tommy Haas	9	Delray Beach, United States	Hard	QF	6–3, 2–6, 6–4	63
