= Laurence Tieleman =

Italian tennis player

- Country (sports): Italy
- Residence: Brussels, Belgium
- Born: 14 November 1972 (age 53) Brussels, Belgium
- Height: 1.80 m (5 ft 11 in)
- Turned pro: 1993
- Retired: 2003
- Plays: Right-handed (1-handed backhand)
- Prize money: $968,450

Singles
- Career record: 41–61
- Career titles: 0
- Highest ranking: No. 72 (26 April 1999) Finalist London Queen’s Club Championship 1998 Semi-Finalist Newport Hall of Fame Championship (1993;1998;1999;2000) Quarter Finalist Hong-Kong Heineken Open (1999)

Grand Slam singles results
- Australian Open: 2R (2000)
- French Open: 1R (1999)
- Wimbledon: 3R (1993) 1R (1994; 1995; 1999)
- US Open: 3R (1999) 1R (1995) 4 Challengers Titles in Singles 6 Challengers Titles in Doubles

Doubles
- Career record: 21–34
- Career titles: 1
- Highest ranking: No. 117 (23 August 1999)

Grand Slam doubles results
- Australian Open: 1R (1999, 2001)
- Wimbledon: 1R (1993)
- US Open: 2R (2000)
- Last updated on: 21 May 2022.

Laurence Tieleman (born 14 November 1972) is a former professional tennis player from Italy.

== Personal life ==
Tieleman has a Dutch father and an Italian mother, both working for the European Community. He began playing tennis at age seven and attended the Nick Bollettieri Tennis Academy in Bradenton, FL, United States from ages 13 to 17.

Tieleman resided in both Assisi and Brussels during his playing career.

== Tennis career ==
Laurence turned professional in 1993. He won one tour-level doubles title (in Tashkent in 1998), and 4 Challenger events in singles during his career. Tieleman's best singles performance was finishing as the runner-up at Queen's in 1998. The right-hander reached his career-high ATP singles ranking of World No. 72 in April 1999.

== ATP career finals ==
=== Singles: 1 (1 runner-up) ===
| Legend Grand Slam Tournaments (0–0) ATP World Tour Finals (0–0) ATP Masters Series (0–0) ATP Championship Series (0–0) ATP World Series (0–1) | Finals by surface Hard (0–0) Clay (0–0) Grass (0–1) Carpet (0–0) | Finals by setting Outdoors (0–1) Indoors (0–0) |

| Result | W–L | Date | Tournament | Tier | Surface | Opponent | Score |
|---|---|---|---|---|---|---|---|
| Loss | 0–1 | Jun 1998 | Queen's, United Kingdom | World Series | Grass | (Australia) Scott Draper | 6–7^{(5–7)}, 4–6 |

=== Doubles: 1 (1 title) ===
| Legend Grand Slam Tournaments (0–0) ATP World Tour Finals (0–0) ATP Masters Series (0–0) ATP Championship Series (0–0) ATP World Series (1–0) | Finals by surface Hard (1–0) Clay (0–0) Grass (0–0) Carpet (0–0) | Finals by setting Outdoors (1–0) Indoors (0–0) |

| Result | W–L | Date | Tournament | Tier | Surface | Partner | Opponents | Score |
|---|---|---|---|---|---|---|---|---|
| Win | 1–0 | Sep 1998 | Tashkent, Uzbekistan | International Series | Hard | (Italy) Stefano Pescosolido | (Denmark) Kenneth Carlsen (Netherlands) Sjeng Schalken | 7–5, 4–6, 7–5 |

== ATP Challenger and ITF Futures finals ==
=== Singles: 5 (3–2) ===
| Legend ATP Challenger (3–2) ITF Futures (0–0) | Finals by surface Hard (2–1) Clay (0–0) Grass (0–1) Carpet (1–0) |

| Result | W–L | Date | Tournament | Tier | Surface | Opponent | Score |
|---|---|---|---|---|---|---|---|
| Win | 1–0 | Aug 1994 | Brasília, Brazil | Challenger | Hard | (France) Frederic Vitoux | 2–6, 7–6, 6–4 |
| Loss | 1–1 | Aug 1994 | Fortaleza, Brazil | Challenger | Hard | (Mexico) Óscar Ortiz | 6–7, 1–6 |
| Win | 2–1 | Oct 1994 | Réunion Island, Réunion | Challenger | Hard | (Kenya) Paul Wekesa | 7–5, 2–6, 6–3 |
| Win | 3–1 | Jan 1999 | Heilbronn, Germany | Challenger | Carpet | (Germany) Markus Hantschk | 6–2, 5–7, 6–3 |
| Loss | 3–2 | Jun 2000 | Surbiton, United Kingdom | Challenger | Grass | (Australia) Wayne Arthurs | 6–4, 6–7^{(6–8)}, 4–6 |

=== Doubles: 17 (7–10) ===
| Legend ATP Challenger (7–10) ITF Futures (0–0) | Finals by surface Hard (6–6) Clay (0–4) Grass (0–0) Carpet (1–0) |

| Result | W–L | Date | Tournament | Tier | Surface | Partner | Opponents | Score |
|---|---|---|---|---|---|---|---|---|
| Win | 1–0 | Sep 1992 | Singapore, Singapore | Challenger | Hard | (United States) Martin Blackman | (Germany) Patrick Baur (Netherlands) Sander Groen | 6–4, 1–6, 7–6 |
| Loss | 1–1 | Feb 1993 | Mar del Plata, Argentina | Challenger | Clay | (Russia) Andrey Merinov | (France) Jean-Philippe Fleurian (Netherlands) Mark Koevermans | 3–6, 3–6 |
| Loss | 1–2 | Feb 1993 | Viña del Mar, Chile | Challenger | Clay | (Russia) Andrey Merinov | (Chile) Marcelo Rebolledo (Argentina) Martín Rodríguez | 3–6, 6–7 |
| Loss | 1–3 | Oct 1993 | Ponte Vedra, United States | Challenger | Hard | (Venezuela) Maurice Ruah | (Canada) Sébastien Lareau (Canada) Daniel Nestor | 6–2, 1–6, 4–6 |
| Win | 2–3 | Oct 1993 | Caracas, Venezuela | Challenger | Hard | (Venezuela) Maurice Ruah | (The Bahamas) Mark Knowles (United States) Alex O'Brien | 5–7, 6–4, 7–6 |
| Loss | 2–4 | Sep 1994 | Seoul, South Korea | Challenger | Hard | (Mexico) Óscar Ortiz | (United States) Bill Barber (United States) Ari Nathan | 6–7, 2–6 |
| Loss | 2–5 | Nov 1995 | Beijing, China | Challenger | Hard | (Germany) Martin Zumpft | (United States) Ivan Baron (Portugal) João Cunha-Silva | 4–6, 4–6 |
| Loss | 2–6 | Mar 1996 | Salinas, Ecuador | Challenger | Hard | (Argentina) Daniel Orsanic | (Venezuela) Juan Carlos Bianchi (Ivory Coast) Claude N'Goran | 5–7, 4–6 |
| Loss | 2–7 | May 1996 | Budapest, Hungary | Challenger | Clay | (Israel) Eyal Ran | (Portugal) Nuno Marques (Belgium) Tom Vanhoudt | 4–6, 1–6 |
| Loss | 2–8 | Sep 1996 | Tashkent, Uzbekistan | Challenger | Clay | (Russia) Andrei Cherkasov | (Spain) Albert Portas (Argentina) Marcelo Charpentier | 1–6, 2–6 |
| Win | 3–8 | Feb 1997 | Wolfsburg, Germany | Challenger | Carpet | (Italy) Nicola Bruno | (Sweden) Henrik Holm (Sweden) Nils Holm | 7–6, 6–4 |
| Win | 4–8 | Feb 1998 | West Bloomfield, United States | Challenger | Hard | (United States) Jim Thomas | (Mexico) Alejandro Hernández (Mexico) David Roditi | 7–6, 6–4 |
| Win | 5–8 | Feb 1998 | Singapore, Singapore | Challenger | Hard | (United States) Jim Thomas | (Australia) James Holmes (Australia) Andrew Painter | 6–3, 3–6, 7–6 |
| Win | 6–8 | Aug 2000 | Lexington, United States | Challenger | Hard | (Switzerland) Lorenzo Manta | (South Africa) Grant Stafford (South Africa) Wesley Whitehouse | 7–6^{(7–5)}, 7–6^{(7–3)} |
| Loss | 6–9 | Aug 2000 | Binghamton, United States | Challenger | Hard | (Switzerland) Lorenzo Manta | (South Africa) Justin Bower (South Africa) Jeff Coetzee | 3–6, 5–7 |
| Win | 7–9 | Nov 2000 | Brest, France | Challenger | Hard | (Finland) Tuomas Ketola | (Czech Republic) František Čermák (Czech Republic) Ota Fukárek | 7–6^{(7–5)}, 1–6, 6–3 |
| Loss | 7–10 | Mar 2002 | Osaka, Japan | Challenger | Hard | (Netherlands) John Van Lottum | (Slovakia) Karol Beck (France) Cedric Kauffmann | 5–7, 1–6 |

== Performance timelines ==
Key
| W | F | SF | QF | #R | RR | Q# | DNQ | A | NH |

(W) winner; (F) finalist; (SF) semifinalist; (QF) quarterfinalist; (#R) rounds 4, 3, 2, 1; (RR) round-robin stage; (Q#) qualification round; (DNQ) did not qualify; (A) absent; (NH) not held; (SR) strike rate (events won / competed); (W–L) win–loss record.

=== Singles ===
| Tournament | 1992 | 1993 | 1994 | 1995 | 1996 | 1997 | 1998 | 1999 | 2000 | 2001 | 2002 | SR | W–L | Win % |
|---|---|---|---|---|---|---|---|---|---|---|---|---|---|---|
Grand Slam tournaments
| Australian Open | Q1 | A | A | A | A | A | Q1 | 1R | 2R | Q1 | A | 0 / 2 | 1–2 | 33% |
| French Open | A | Q3 | Q1 | Q2 | A | A | Q1 | 1R | Q2 | A | A | 0 / 1 | 0–1 | 0% |
| Wimbledon | Q1 | 3R | 1R | Q2 | Q1 | Q1 | A | 1R | 1R | A | Q1 | 0 / 4 | 2–4 | 33% |
| US Open | A | Q1 | Q1 | Q1 | A | 1R | Q2 | 3R | Q2 | A | Q1 | 0 / 2 | 2–2 | 50% |
| Win–loss | 0–0 | 2–1 | 0–1 | 0–0 | 0–0 | 0–1 | 0–0 | 2–4 | 1–2 | 0–0 | 0–0 | 0 / 9 | 5–9 | 36% |
ATP World Tour Masters 1000
| Indian Wells | A | A | Q1 | Q1 | A | A | A | A | A | A | A | 0 / 0 | 0–0 | – |
| Miami | A | Q2 | Q1 | Q1 | A | A | A | 1R | Q1 | Q1 | A | 0 / 1 | 0–1 | 0% |
| Rome | A | A | Q2 | Q1 | Q1 | A | A | A | 1R | A | A | 0 / 1 | 0–1 | 0% |
| Canada | A | A | A | A | A | A | 1R | 2R | A | A | A | 0 / 2 | 1–2 | 33% |
| Cincinnati | A | A | A | A | A | A | Q1 | A | A | A | A | 0 / 0 | 0–0 | – |
| Stuttgart | A | A | A | A | A | A | A | 1R | A | A | A | 0 / 1 | 0–1 | 0% |
| Win–loss | 0–0 | 0–0 | 0–0 | 0–0 | 0–0 | 0–0 | 0–1 | 1–3 | 0–1 | 0–0 | 0–0 | 0 / 5 | 1–5 | 17% |

=== Doubles ===
| Tournament | 1992 | 1993 | 1994 | 1995 | 1996 | 1997 | 1998 | 1999 | 2000 | 2001 | 2002 | SR | W–L | Win % |
|---|---|---|---|---|---|---|---|---|---|---|---|---|---|---|
Grand Slam tournaments
| Australian Open | A | A | A | A | A | A | A | 1R | A | 1R | A | 0 / 2 | 0–2 | 0% |
| French Open | A | A | A | A | A | A | A | A | A | A | A | 0 / 0 | 0–0 | – |
| Wimbledon | Q1 | 1R | Q2 | Q1 | A | Q2 | A | A | A | A | Q2 | 0 / 1 | 0–1 | 0% |
| US Open | A | A | A | A | A | A | A | 1R | 2R | A | A | 0 / 2 | 1–2 | 33% |
| Win–loss | 0–0 | 0–1 | 0–0 | 0–0 | 0–0 | 0–0 | 0–0 | 0–2 | 1–1 | 0–1 | 0–0 | 0 / 5 | 1–5 | 17% |
ATP World Tour Masters 1000
| Miami | A | A | Q2 | A | A | Q1 | A | A | A | A | A | 0 / 0 | 0–0 | – |
| Rome | A | A | Q2 | A | A | A | A | A | Q2 | A | A | 0 / 0 | 0–0 | – |
| Cincinnati | A | A | A | A | A | A | Q2 | A | A | A | A | 0 / 0 | 0–0 | – |
| Win–loss | 0–0 | 0–0 | 0–0 | 0–0 | 0–0 | 0–0 | 0–0 | 0–0 | 0–0 | 0–0 | 0–0 | 0 / 0 | 0–0 | – |
