= Timur Ganiev =

Uzbekistani tennis player

- Full name: Timur Valerievich Ganiev
- Country (sports): Uzbekistan
- Born: 24 October 1975 (age 49); Tashkent, Uzbekistan
- Prize money: $21,091

Singles
- Career record: 0–1
- Highest ranking: No. 712 (27 Apr 1999)

Doubles
- Career record: 0–3
- Highest ranking: No. 577 (1 Nov 1999)

Timur Valerievich Ganiev (born 24 October 1975) is an Uzbekistani former professional tennis player.

Born in Tashkent, Ganiev played in two Davis Cup ties for the Uzbekistan team in 1994. He featured in the singles main draw of the 1998 President's Cup and was beaten in the first round by Marat Safin, who was seeded sixth.

== ITF Futures finals ==
=== Doubles: 1 (0–1) ===
Result	W–L	Date	Tournament	Surface	Partner	Opponents	Score
Loss	0–1	Mar 1999	Philippines F2, Manila	Hard	(United States) Jesse Walter	(Germany) Marcus Hilpert (United States) Andrew Rueb	5–7, 4–6
