= Tim Henman =

British tennis player (born 1974)

Tim Henman OBE
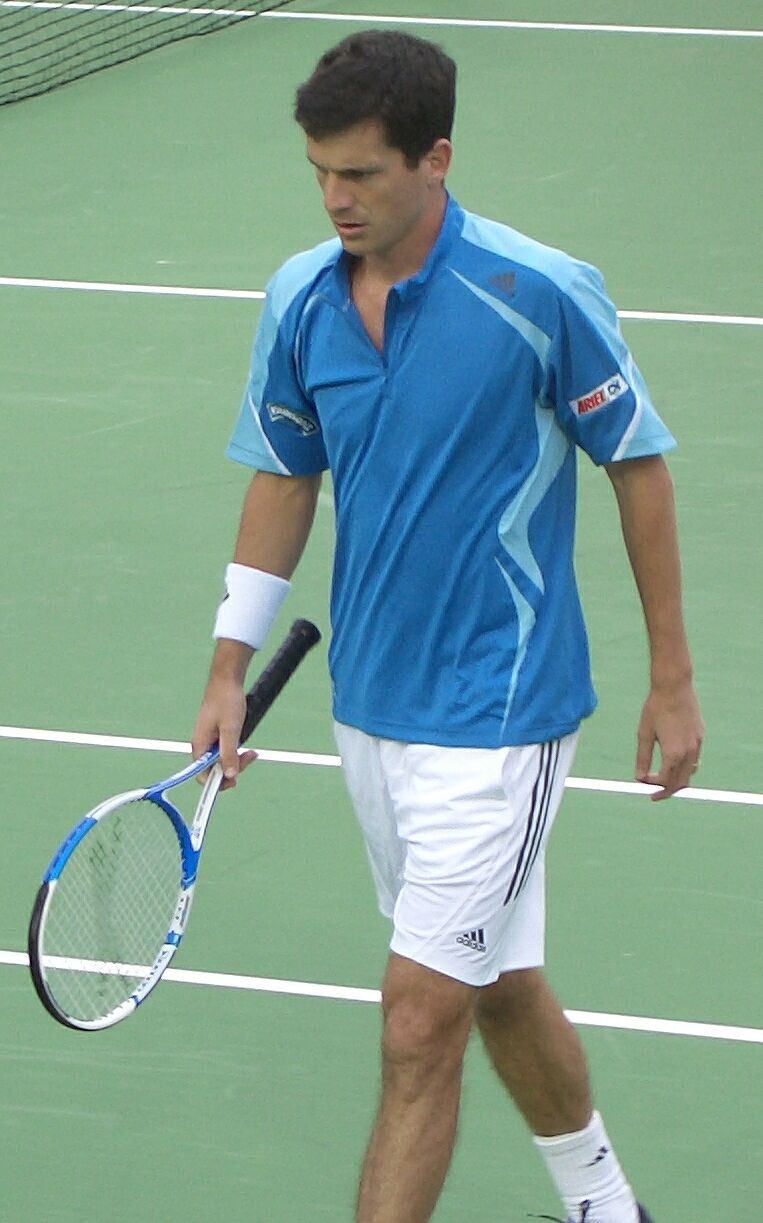
- Henman at the 2006 Australian Open.
- Full name: Timothy Henry Henman
- Country (sports): Great Britain
- Residence: Aston Tirrold, Oxfordshire, England
- Born: 6 September 1974 (age 52) Oxford, England
- Height: 6 ft 1 in (1.85 m)
- Turned pro: 1993 (amateur tour from 1992)
- Retired: 2007
- Plays: Right-handed (one-handed backhand)
- Coach: David Felgate (1992–2001); Larry Stefanki (2001–2003); Paul Annacone (2003–2007)
- Prize money: US$11,635,542

Singles
- Career record: 496–274 (64.4%)
- Career titles: 11
- Highest ranking: No. 4 (8 July 2002)

Grand Slam singles results
- Australian Open: 4R (2000, 2001, 2002)
- French Open: SF (2004)
- Wimbledon: SF (1998, 1999, 2001, 2002)
- US Open: SF (2004)

Other tournaments
- Tour Finals: SF (1998)
- Grand Slam Cup: SF (1996)
- Olympic Games: 2R (1996)

Doubles
- Career record: 89–81
- Career titles: 4
- Highest ranking: No. 62 (21 February 2000)

Grand Slam doubles results
- Australian Open: 1R (1996, 1997, 1998)
- French Open: 3R (1996)
- Wimbledon: 2R (1994)
- US Open: 2R (1996)
Medal record
Representing Great Britain
Olympic Games
Silver medal – second place	1996 Atlanta	Doubles

Timothy Henry Henman OBE (born 6 September 1974) is a British former professional tennis player. He was ranked world No. 4 in men's singles by the Association of Tennis Professionals (ATP) during the early 2000s. Henman won 15 career ATP Tour titles (eleven in singles and four in doubles), including a Masters event at the 2003 Paris Masters. A serve-and-volley player, he was the first British man to reach the singles semifinals of Wimbledon since Roger Taylor in the 1970s. Henman reached six major semifinals, and earned a 40–14 win-loss record with the Great Britain Davis Cup team.

Henman started playing tennis before the age of three, and began systematic training in the Slater Squad at eleven. After suffering a serious injury, he began touring internationally as a junior with some success. He rose quickly up the ATP rankings, and in 1996 reached the quarterfinals of Wimbledon. For most of his career, Henman was considered a grass court specialist, reaching four Wimbledon semifinals between 1998 and 2002. He also achieved considerable success on hard courts early in his career. He became comfortable on clay only later in his career, when in 2004 he reached the semifinals of the French Open. Henman retired from professional tennis in late 2007, but remained active on the ATP Champions Tour (a tour for former professional tennis players).

== Early life ==
Henman was born in Oxford, Oxfordshire, as the youngest of a family of three boys. Henman's father Anthony, a solicitor, was accomplished at various sports, including tennis, hockey and squash. His mother Jane, a dress designer, played Junior Wimbledon and introduced Tim and his elder brothers, Michael and Richard, to tennis as soon as they could walk on the family's grass tennis court. His great-grandfather played at Wimbledon. His maternal grandfather, Henry Billington, played at Wimbledon between 1948 and 1951, and he represented Britain in the Davis Cup in 1948, 1950 and 1951.

In 1901 his maternal great-grandmother, Ellen Stanwell-Brown, was reputedly the first woman to serve overarm at Wimbledon. His maternal grandmother, Susan Billington, appeared regularly at Wimbledon in the 1950s, playing mixed doubles on Centre Court with her husband Henry, reaching the third round of the ladies' doubles in 1951, 1955 and 1956.

Henman grew up in Weston-on-the-Green, Oxfordshire, a village between Oxford and Bicester with a population of around 500. At home, the family had a grass tennis court in their back garden. Henman began playing tennis before the age of three with a shortened squash racket. At this stage, he was already teaching himself how to serve and volley. At an early stage in his life, Henman decided if he did not succeed in tennis, he would become a golfer instead.

Henman attended the Longbridge School for boys between the ages of five and seven, and was enrolled in the private Dragon School in Oxford from seven to 11. He excelled in all sports but was always best at tennis. But Henman was small for his age, a factor which would bode against him in the future. In 1985, he was appointed the school's captain of tennis and led the school's tennis team to win 21 out of 27 matches. He remains to this day the only pupil who has won both the school's junior and senior tennis tournaments in the same year. From the age of eight until his introduction to the Slater Squad, Henman received coaching from the David Lloyd Tennis Centre, where he was given personal lessons by former professional player Onny Parun from New Zealand. In retrospect, Parun stated that Henman's greatest strength "had always been his head." David Lloyd noticed the same mental toughness and was impressed.

He left the Dragon School after he attained a scholarship for Reed's School in Cobham, Surrey. Henman received the scholarship after a physical test: to run until you dropped. Henman, along with Marc Moreso and David Loosemore, did not drop, and was given a scholarship. At this point in his life, Lloyd persuaded Henman's parents to allow him to pursue a tennis career. In retrospect, Lloyd notes, Henman's parents understood what many don't: "you can always go back to higher education at 22 or 23 but that that is far too late to start a serious tennis career."

Henman was picked up by the Slater Squad, a group funded by financier Jim Slater, at the age of 11. The main goal of the Slater Squad was to pick and coach young players from the ages of nine or ten, instead of 11 and 12 as the Lawn Tennis Association (LTA) did. The original intake for the squad was eight players between the ages of eight and 11. In addition to Tim, the squad consisted of Jamie Delgado, Gary Le Pla, Paul Jessop, James Bailey, Adrian Blackman, James Davidson and Marc Moreso. In the squad, Henman worked on tennis three hours a day: two hours playing tennis and receiving advice from Donald Watt, and the last hour on gymnastics and learning about the game. In contrast to popular belief, Henman was not considered the best of the bunch, and Sue Barker, the British 1976 French Open Women's champion, judged that there was "nothing particularly special in his game in those days". She said, however, that while Henman did not have the natural skills of a tennis player, he was "a hard worker". None of his fellow players in the Slater Squad saw Henman as a potential British number one, with most believing Marc Moreso to be the group's brightest hope. Not long after becoming a member of the Slater Squad, Henman was diagnosed with osteochondritis, a bone disease. He was unable to play tennis for six months, and it was two years before he could return to tournaments. Luckily for Henman, Slater kept funding him while he was recuperating, because of insistence from Lloyd who believed in Henman's tennis abilities.

At Reed's School he passed ten GCSE exams, but failed chemistry. Outside of school, he worked in Anji's emporium in order to save money for a new racquet. As Henman notes in retrospect, "I passed the others with a few As, a few Bs and a few Cs. It was nothing dazzling by any means, but I got by." At the age of 16, Henman told his mother that it was impossible for him to retain his good grades while keeping up in the tennis world. In 1990 he dropped out of school altogether and focused on becoming a singles player, though Lloyd and the leadership of the Slater Squad had confidence in him as a doubles player, not singles. On the statistics that were available to them, Henman had managed to win five doubles tournaments but only two singles tournaments. But Henman disagreed with the Slater Squad leadership and began playing for the LTA in 1991. At the age of 17, Henman toured South America for eight weeks.

== Personal life ==
On 11 December 1999, Henman married his longtime girlfriend, TV producer Lucy Heald, in Hampshire. They have three daughters, Rose Elizabeth (born 19 October 2002), Olivia Susan (born 15 December 2004), and Grace (born 14 September 2007). Having lived in Barnes, southwest London, the family moved in 2003 to a Grade II listed property in Aston Tirrold, south Oxfordshire. Henman occasionally smoked cigarettes during his tennis career. He is a supporter of Oxford United.

His father died on 3 May 2024 from blood cancer.

== Tennis career ==
=== Junior tour ===
Henman had an inauspicious first tour year in 1991. He won the first round in the New South Wales Championship against Andrew Turner, 6–1, 6–3, but lost in the second round to Corrado Borroni 5–7, 1–6. He was defeated by Australian Michael Hill in the first round of the 1991 Australian Open junior class, 7–5, 3–6, 5–7. At the National the same year, Henman reached the third round, but was defeated 6–1, 6–2 by Andrew Richardson. His performance in doubles matches was markedly better. Henman reached the quarter-finals in the New South Wales Championship with Richardson, and won the Midland Bank Junior Championship in doubles with Jamie Delgado, an associate from the Slater Squad days.

1992 began well, with Henman reaching the finals in Nottingham after defeating Delgado in straight sets in the semi-final. But Henman was defeated in the final by top-seed Mark Schofield, and in the junior French Open by Björn Jacob in three sets, 6–7, 6–1, 9–7. He was defeated in the first round of the Wimbledon junior by Mexican clay specialist Enrique Abaroa in straight sets; 6–2, 6–1. However, things improved dramatically from then on, and in the National Junior Championships he reached the semi-finals without dropping a single set. In the semi-finals Henman met Schofield, and defeated him in four sets; 2–6, 6–3, 7–6, 6–2. Henman met Nick Baglin in the final, and won the match 3–6, 7–5, 6–4, 6–4. In 1992 he turned 18, and Henman began his tennis career in the senior satellite tournaments.

=== Professional career ===
==== 1993–1995: Early years ====
From July 1992 to July 1993, Henman grew six inches to six feet one, and went from seven stones to nine stones in weight. This would prove important for his career, as he acknowledged: "As a junior I had pretty good technique. Now I've got the strength and reach, and on the serve that has helped tremendously." Henman was ranked 774th in the world at the beginning of 1993, but by July he had come close to the top 600. In July, Henman received a wildcard to participate in the ATP Challenger tournament in Bristol, England. In the first round, he defeated Colombian Miguel Tobón, ranked 257th, in straight sets, 6–0, 6–3. In the second round he met the Frenchman Éric Winogradsky and defeated him also in straight sets, 7–6, 6–3. Henman was defeated in the quarter-final by British player Chris Bailey, 6–2, 6–1. By November Henman's rank had increased to 415th. Henman's next tournament was the Volkswagen National Championships in Telford, England; he reached the quarter-final but lost to top-ranked British male player Jeremy Bates, 7–5, 7–6. As 1993 drew to a close, Henman played one last tournament in Israel, which he won.

He started the 1994 season with the four-legged Indian satellite circuit; there he won 18 singles matches in a row. Henman was fairly successful at the British Satellite Masters in Croydon, and by the end of the tournament he was ranked 222nd in the world. Encouraged by his success in the satellite circuit, Henman tried his luck at the ATP tour. Henman travelled to the Far East with Bates, and qualified for his first ATP tournament in April, at the Japan Tennis Championship. In his first round he defeated Kelly Jones, 6–2, 6–3, in the second round he defeated Darren Cahill, 6–2, 7–5 and in the third round Henman was defeated by Pete Sampras, 6–1, 6–2. From this performance Henman increased his ranking to 184th. His success in the Japan Open was followed by a failure to qualify at the Hong Kong Open. Because of this failure, he ended the Far East tour by entering a number of satellite tournaments. Henman entered the Nagoya Open, and defeated eighth seed Eyal Ran in the first round, but lost in the second round to Gouichi Motomura. At the Manila Open, another satellite tournament, Henman reached the final but was defeated by fifth seed Michael Tebbutt, 2–6, 2–6.

After Manila he returned to Europe. In his first Grand Slam bid, Henman failed to qualify in the 1994 French Open, losing the first qualifier round to Australian Wayne Arthurs. His next tournament was the Annenheim Open in Austria, where he lost in the first round to Canadian Sébastien Lareau in straight sets, 6–3, 6–2. However, not all was bad, and Henman, ranked 161st at the time, received a wildcard to qualify for the Stella Artois Championship. In the first round Henman defeated Swedish Peter Lundgren, 7–5, 7–6, but in the second round he succumbed to the eventual champion American Todd Martin, 6–4, 6–4. Henman received a wildcard for the Manchester Open, where he lost in the first round to American Alex O'Brien, and the Wimbledon Championship, the first Grand Slam he had ever played (he failed to qualify to Wimbledon in 1993). At Wimbledon, Henman lost in the first round to German David Prinosil in four sets, 6–4, 3–6, 2–6, 2–6. His early defeat in Wimbledon forced Henman into short period of obscurity in the satellite circuit. Henman reached the semi-finals at the Bristol Open and the fourth round at the Winnetka Open (in Illinois).

By September 1994, Henman was ranked 146th, and in the same month he returned to the Far East. His first tournament in the Far East was the Seoul Open. Henman lost in the second round to Korean Kim Nam-hoon, who was ranked outside the top 700. At the Singapore Challenger, Henman reached the quarterfinals and lost to fellow Brit Chris Wilkinson. He was forced to retire in the third set against Wilkinson when he fell and received a blow to his leg. When he returned to England not long after the tournament, it was revealed that Henman had broken his ankle in three places and would not play another tournament until February 1995. In fact, he was not fully recovered until May. While injured, his ranking went from 146th to 272nd in the world.

The grass season in 1995 proved successful for Henman; he reached the semi-finals at the Annenheim Open, later at the Queen's Club Championships he reached the second round after defeating German Martin Sinner, and in Nottingham he reached the quarter-finals, his first quarter-final in the ATP tour. His success in these tournaments increased his ranking from 272nd to 219th. He won his first match in a Grand Slam event at the Wimbledon Championship over Kenyan Paul Wekesa in straight sets, 7–6, 6–0, 6–4. However, Henman's winning streak did not last long, and in the second round he met Sampras, and was defeated 6–2, 6–3, 7–6. Two days later he partnered Jeremy Bates in the first round of the doubles at Wimbledon but the pair became the first players in the Open era to be defaulted at Wimbledon after Henman accidentally hit a ballgirl on the side of head with a ball, having lashed out with his racket in frustration after losing a point to a net cord in the fourth set tie-break of their match against Jeff Tarango and Henrik Holm. Because he hit the ball in anger, the referee Alan Mills ruled that this was an automatic disqualification for unsportsmanlike conduct. Henman was very apologetic about the incident, presenting the girl with a bunch of flowers. The rest of the grass season was fairly successful for Henman, he appeared at the Manchester Open and reached the semi-final at the Newcastle Open. At the end of the grass season, Henman's rank had risen to 150th in the world.

After the grass season, Henman headed for the United States. He participated in the RCA Championships and defeated 16th seed Frenchman Cédric Pioline, the 1993 US Open finalist, in straight sets. He lost the following round, but was later able to qualify for the US Open. In the first round, Henman defeated Spanish Juan Albert Viloca in four sets, 6–3, 4–6, 6–3, 6–2. In the second round, Henman was defeated by American Jared Palmer in four sets, 4–6, 7–6, 3–6, 1–6. Henman's 1995 end-of-year ranking was 95.

==== 1996–2000: Breakthrough ====
Henman climbed up the rankings quickly. In 1994, he was among the top 200 players in the world; by 1995, among the top 100; and by 1996, he had made it into the top 30 and won a medal at the Atlanta Olympics. He was the UK's highest-ranked player that year, and won the Most Improved Player trophy at the ATP awards. He was subsequently elected to the ATP Tour Player Council and went on to win his first championship in January 1997. In March of that year, he underwent surgery on his elbow which kept him out of action for two months.

Henman came to the attention of the wider tennis world in 1996 when he came from match point down, saving two successive match points with aces when serving at 3–5 and 15/40, and then breaking his opponent's serve twice in a row to win the final set 7–5 and beat reigning French Open champion Yevgeny Kafelnikov in the first round at Wimbledon, going on to reach the quarter finals before losing to Todd Martin. A few weeks later he was to reach the men's doubles final at the 1996 Summer Olympics in partnership with Neil Broad, losing to No. 1 seeds Todd Woodbridge and Mark Woodforde to receive the silver medal. By the time he reached the last 16 at the US Open later in the year, he was firmly established as a top player.

He won his first ATP Tour title in January 1997, beating Carlos Moyá at the Sydney International event. He was seeded 14th at Wimbledon, and again reached the quarter-final, defeating reigning champion and 4th seed Richard Krajicek in the fourth round before falling to 1991 champion Michael Stich. In 1998 he went one better, reaching the semi-final for the first time, by which time he was ranked as one of the top 10 ATP players.

Henman came close to reaching the final on a number of occasions, losing in the semi-finals to the eventual champion in 1998, 1999, 2001 and 2002. The first two of those semi-final losses were to Pete Sampras; in 2001 he lost to Goran Ivanišević, a former two-time finalist; in 2002 he lost to Lleyton Hewitt, ranked number one in the world at the time. In 2000 Henman reached the fourth round at Wimbledon; and in 1996, 1997, 2003 and 2004 he lost in the quarter-finals.

One of the tournaments in which he has been most successful is Queen's Club. He reached the final in 1999, where he lost to Pete Sampras, and went on to reach the final again in 2001 and 2002, where both times he lost to Lleyton Hewitt. Based on that success he was expected, at least within England, to be the first man since Fred Perry in 1936 to win a major for Britain – which in the end he never managed, Wimbledon 2001 being the closest that he ever came to reaching a final.

==== 2001–2004: Career peak ====
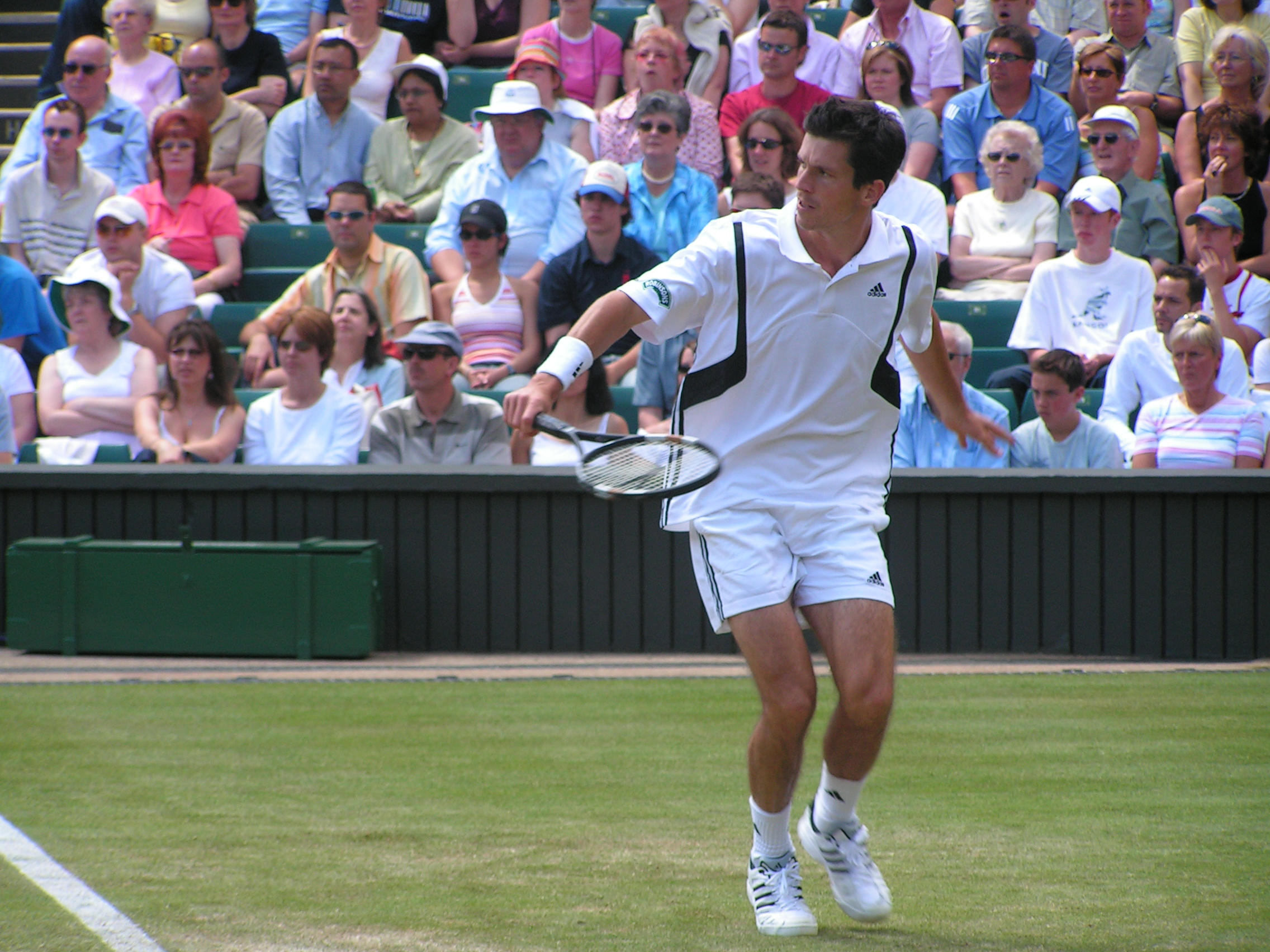
Henman playing a backhand at Wimbledon, 2004

Henman started the 2001 ATP season with a ranking of tenth in the world. At the Adelaide International Henman lost in the semi-finals to Nicolás Massú. His next tournament was the Australian Open; Henman had wins over Hicham Arazi, Nicolás Lapentti, and Wayne Arthurs, but lost to Patrick Rafter in the fourth round in straight sets. He then won the Copenhagen Open, dispatching Andreas Vinciguerra in two sets. Henman then lost in the second round of the Rotterdam Open. Rotterdam was followed by a defeat in the Scottsdale Open. In March, Henman reached the third round at Indian Wells, where he lost to Nicolás Lapentti in straight sets. The hard court season wrapped up with the Miami Masters where Henman lost in round two to Fabrice Santoro.

By the beginning of the clay season in April, Henman's ranking had slipped from 10th to 12th in the world. He reached the second round of the Estoril Open, the quarter-finals of Monte-Carlo, round two in Rome, and lost in round one at the Hamburg Masters. At the French Open Henman had wins over Tomas Behrend and Sjeng Schalken, but lost to Guillermo Cañas in five sets in round three. At the end of the clay season, Henman's ranking had risen back up to 11th.

On the grass at Queen's Club Championships Henman reached the final, where he was defeated in straight sets by Australian Lleyton Hewitt. Many commentators believed Henman had a chance to win that year's Wimbledon with several top-seeds being defeated early in the tournament. Henman came through the first three rounds with ease, winning over Artem Derepasko, Martin Lee, and Sjeng Schalken. However, it took five sets to defeat the 22nd American seed Todd Martin in round four. In the quarter-finals Henman beat a young Roger Federer in four tough sets, the latter having defeated Henman's longtime nemesis Sampras in the fourth round in the only tour match that Sampras and Federer would ever play. In his semi-final Henman met wildcard entrant, Goran Ivanišević where Ivanišević eventually managed to win in five sets in a match that spanned 3 days because of numerous rain delays. Henman had come back from losing the first set and played some stunning tennis – including crushing Ivanišević in the third set 6–0 – to take the lead by 2 sets to 1 before rain first stopped play. The players returned the following day but Henman couldn't recapture his form from the Friday and lost the fourth set in a tie break. Henman had got as close as 2 points from victory but serve was with his opponent and he was not able to hang on. Only 5 games into the deciding set, rain fell again and the players were forced to wait it out overnight to finish the epic encounter. When the pair finally returned on Sunday, Ivanišević was able to wrap up the final set and dash the English player's dream of reaching a Wimbledon final.

In August, Henman only reached the second round in the Canada Masters but bounced back and made it to the semi-finals of the Cincinnati Masters. There he lost to Gustavo Kuerten in three sets. His next tournament was nearly as successful, with Henman reaching the quarter-finals at the RCA Championship. Henman lost in the quarter-finals, again to Kuerten in three sets. At the US Open he reached the third round; Henman defeated Vacek and Fernando Meligeni, but was upset by Xavier Malisse in five sets. Near the end of the season, Henman won the Swiss Indoors, by defeating the previous runner-up Roger Federer in straight sets.

In 2002, Henman reached the 4th round at the Australian Open and the semi-finals at Wimbledon for the last time in his career, losing this time to Lleyton Hewitt: for the fourth time, his conqueror in the semi-finals went on to win the tournament. He was defeated in the second round of the French Open, and the third round of the US Open. At the ATP tour, Henman was the runner-up at three finals; at one ATP Masters Series, at one ATP 500 Series and at one normal ATP tournament. Henman did not participate in the 2003 Australian Open, reached the third round in the French Open, his best so far, reached the quarter-finals at the Wimbledon Championship and lost in the first round at the US Open to eventual champion Andy Roddick. He reached two ATP finals in 2003, one of them being the Paris Masters, winning both of them—his victory at the 2003 Paris Masters would be his only victory at an ATP Masters tour event.

In 2004, Henman failed to reach the fourth round of the Australian Open and failed to reach the semi-finals at the Wimbledon Championships. However, he reached, to the surprise of commentators, the semi-finals of the French Open and later, the semi-finals of the US Open. His ATP tour was not as successful, but he managed to reach the finals of the Indian Wells, where he was defeated by world No. 1 Roger Federer in two sets, 3–6, 3–6. 2004 would be the last time Henman participated in the Tennis Masters Cup (a tournament between the eight best players of the world). 2004 would prove Henman's last successful year as a tennis player; he failed to reach beyond the third round in any of the Grand Slams from 2005 until his retirement in 2007.

At the Davis Cup World Group Play-off against Austria, Henman and Greg Rusedski played all five rubbers on the Austrian clay, but were beaten 3–2. Henman now decided to withdraw from the Davis Cup to concentrate on his own career.

==== 2005–2007: Final years on tour ====
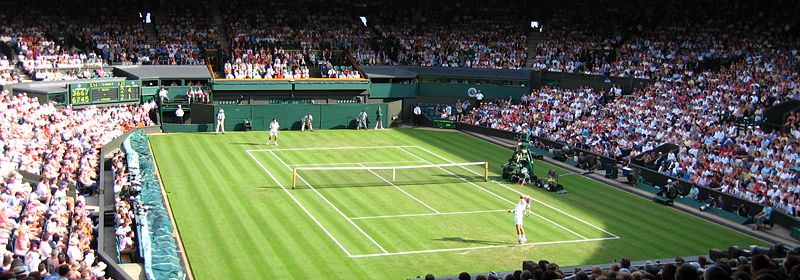
Tim Henman playing at Wimbledon, 2005

His first tournament in 2005 was the Australian Open. Henman defeated Frenchmen Cyril Saulnier in four sets, 6–1, 6–2, 4–6, 6–3, and defeated Romanian Victor Hănescu in three sets, 7–5, 6–1, 6–4, but lost to the 28th seed Russian Nikolay Davydenko in straight sets; 4–6, 2–6, 2–6. The next tournament was the Rotterdam Open where he reached the third round, being defeated by Croatian Mario Ančić, 5–7, 4–6. He did not fare much better at the Dubai Open, and lost in the third round to Croatian Ivan Ljubičić, 5–7, 4–6. Henman's next tournament was the first ATP Masters Series event of the year; at the Indian Wells he reached the quarterfinals after receiving a bye (meaning he could skip the first round). He lost in the quarter-finals to Argentinian Guillermo Cañas, 6–7, 5–7. At the Miami Masters Henman again lost in the quarter-finals, this time to Swiss world no. 1 Roger Federer in straight sets, 4–6, 2–6.

At Henman's first clay tournament of 2005, the Monte-Carlo Masters, he lost in the first round to Argentinian Mariano Zabaleta, 4–6, 6–4, 2–6. Henman improved his clay record that year by reaching the third round at both the Italian Open and the Hamburg Masters, but he disappointed his fans by being defeated by Peruvian Luis Horna in the second round of the French Open in four sets, 5–7, 7–6, 3–6, 4–6. In contrast to the clay season, the grass season began well, with Henman reaching the quarter-finals at the Queen's Club Championships, losing to Swedish Thomas Johansson, 4–6, 4–6. However, after defeating Jarkko Nieminen in the first round of the Wimbledon Championship, he lost in the second round to Russian Dmitry Tursunov in five sets, 6–3, 2–6, 6–3, 3–6, 6–8. His hard court season was not much better; Henman was defeated in the first or second round in all the remaining tournaments he participated in that year. At the US Open he lost to Spaniard Fernando Verdasco in straight sets, 4–6, 2–6, 2–6. At his last match of the year, Henman was beaten by Britain's rising tennis star Andy Murray in the first round in three sets, 3–6, 7–5, 7–6.

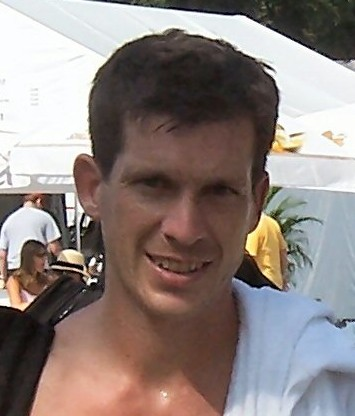
In 2006, Henman won 31, and lost 20 matches in total.

His opening tournament of 2006 was the Qatar Open, where he lost in the second round to Tommy Haas 2–6, 6–7 and 7–5 in tie-break. In that year's Australian Open he was defeated in the first round by Russian Dmitry Tursunov, 7–5, 3–6, 4–6, 5–7. His early defeat in the Australian Open was followed by success in the Zagreb Open; Henman reached the semi-finals, but was defeated by Stefan Koubek, 3–6, 6–3, 2–6. His success in Zagreb was met by failure at the Rotterdam Open, where he was beaten in the second round by future world no. 1 Novak Djokovic in three sets, 7–5, 3–6, 4–6. At the Dubai Open Henman reached the quarter-finals, but lost the match to the Spanish world no. 2 Rafael Nadal in straight sets; 6–7 (1–7 in tie break), 1–6. Henman was defeated in the second round of Indian Wells by up-and-comer Tomáš Berdych in two sets, 4–6, 4–6. Henman ended an eight-match losing streak against Lleyton Hewitt on 25 March 2006, with a 7–6, 6–3 victory at the Miami Masters tournament, but lost in the third round to unseeded German Simon Greul in three sets; 6–0, 1–6, 5–7.

He was defeated in the first round of the Monte-Carlo Masters by Argentinian world no. 8 Gastón Gaudio, 1–6, 3–6. At the Italian Open Henman managed to reach the third round, but lost to Nadal, 2–6, 2–6. His success in the Italian Open was met with a defeat in the second round of the French Open by Dmitry Tursunov in four sets; 3–6, 2–6, 6–4, 4–6. His run at the Queen's Club Championships was far more successful, with Henman losing to Lleyton Hewitt 6–3, 3–6, 6–2 in the semi-finals.

Henman was unseeded at Wimbledon in 2006 for the first time in a number of years after his world ranking slipped down to number 62. At that Wimbledon, he lost in the second round to eventual champion Federer, 6–4, 6–0, 6–2, after a five-set victory over Robin Söderling of Sweden in the first round. At the US Open, Henman reached the second round where he was defeated by Roger Federer, 3–6, 4–6, 5–7. Following his failure at the US Open, Henman played two tournaments in the far east. Starting in Bangkok, Henman reached the quarter-finals where he lost to Paradorn Srichaphan 6–7, 6–4, 7–6. Henman then reached his first final since 2004 at the AIG Open in Tokyo, losing to Roger Federer, 6–3, 6–3. Although Henman was scheduled to play in both Basel & Paris at the end of the 2006 season, he lost in the second round in Basel against the rising Swiss star Stanislas Wawrinka 2–6, 7–6, 6–4. He twisted a knee; he did not retire but resorted to a less mobile game that saw Wawrinka win.

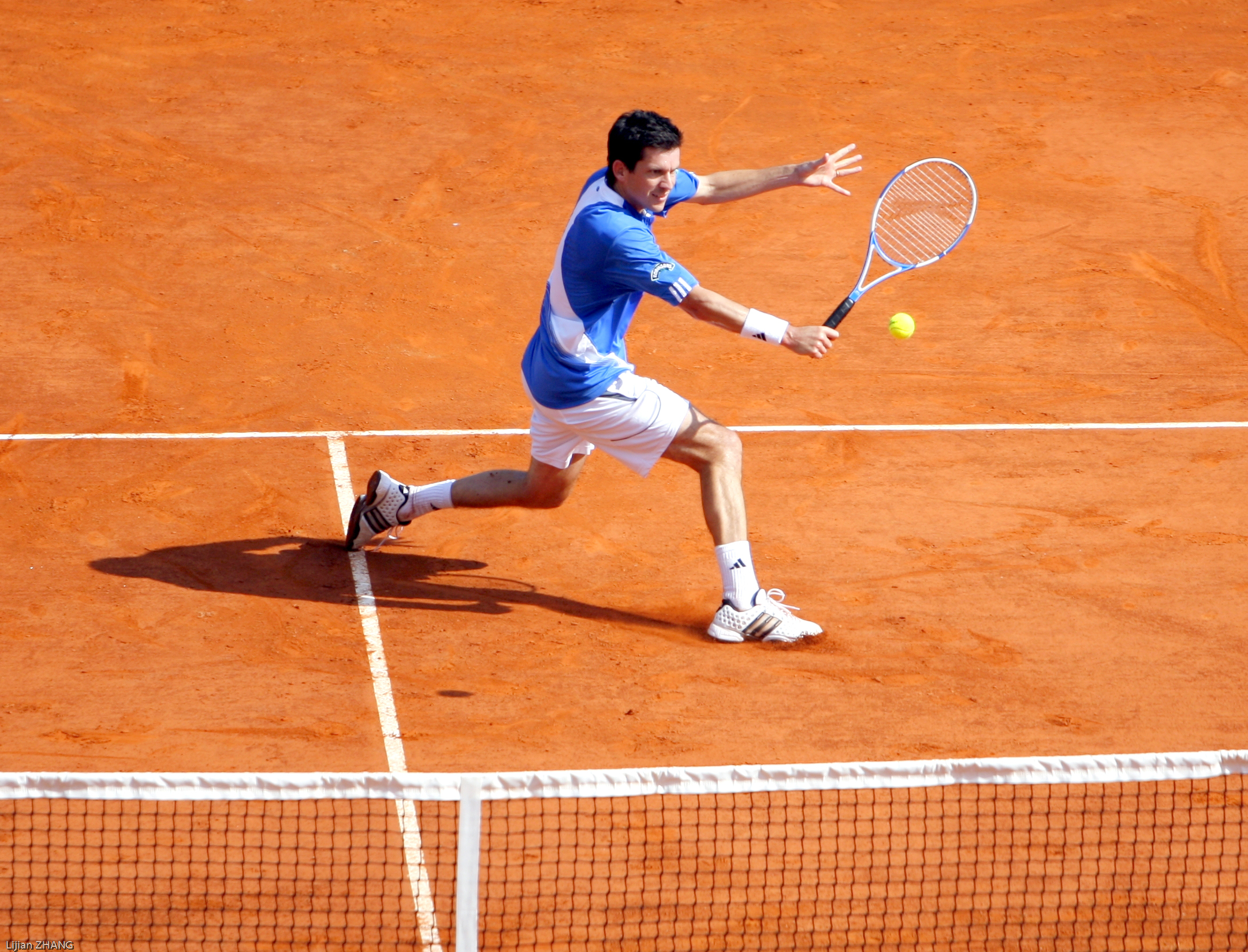
Henman in the first round of the 2007 Monte-Carlo Masters.

On Henman's last practice session before departing for the Australian Open at the start of 2007, having recovered from his knee injury, he injured his hamstring which forced him to withdraw from the tournament. He returned in time to enter Masters Series events in Indian Wells and Miami after withdrawing from Rotterdam and Zagreb but lost in the first round in both of them. Henman's poor luck with injury and form continued into the 2007 clay court season with first round losses to Juan Carlos Ferrero, 5–7, 2–6 in Monaco, Nicolás Almagro, 5–7, 1–6 in Rome and a poor showing against 18-year-old grand slam debutant Ernests Gulbis, 4–6, 3–6, 2–6 in the French Open. Henman's clay-court season ended without a set won. His grass court season got underway on 12 June 2007 at Queens Club, but was put to an abrupt end by Croatian wildcard entry Marin Čilić. However, he ended the day with a doubles victory with partner Lleyton Hewitt over Australian Jordan Kerr and Austrian Alexander Peya. An early loss at a grass court event in Nottingham was followed up with a poor showing at Wimbledon, with Henman losing in the second round to Feliciano López in five sets.

Henman announced at a press conference on 23 August 2007 that he would retire from tennis after playing in the US Open and Britain's Davis Cup tie against Croatia in September 2007.

Henman defeated his rival Dmitry Tursunov (who had won five of their six previous matches) in the first round of the US Open, 6–4, 3–6, 6–3, 6–4, in what many had assumed would be his final Grand Slam match. His actual final match was in the next round on 31 August 2007, losing to Jo-Wilfried Tsonga, 6–7(2–7), 6–2, 5–7, 4–6. Henman seemed sluggish compared to his first-round match, he served for the first set but could not close it out and lost the tiebreaker.

Henman played his final match in the Davis Cup tie against Croatia on 22 September 2007. The doubles match with Jamie Murray was played on Court 1 at Wimbledon which they won, 4–6, 6–4, 7–6, 7–5. The match put Great Britain in an unassailable 3–0 lead and back in the World Group, with the doubles win being added to singles wins the previous day from Henman and Andy Murray. After the match Henman told Sue Barker in an interview on BBC Television and in front of the Court 1 crowd, "It's occasions like this and fans like this that I will miss so much".

== Retirement and post-playing career ==
At the time of his retirement, Henman had already committed to playing a Charity Exhibition at London's Royal Albert Hall during the Seniors Tennis Event The Blackrock Masters in December 2007. Henman's opponent was veteran Swede and former Wimbledon Champion Stefan Edberg, Tim won the pro-set 8–4.

Henman became part of the commentary team for the BBC coverage of the 2008 Wimbledon Championships and has remained there since.

Henman took part in a test event for the adoption of the centre court roof in May 2009, playing mixed doubles with Kim Clijsters against husband and wife team Andre Agassi and Steffi Graf.

Finally he became a member of the AELTC board and became an important member of the Wimbledon organisation. He created his own foundation, called The Tim Henman Foundation, which is to help disadvantaged children.

He enjoys wine and his favourite film is Wedding Crashers.

Since retirement he has played mostly golf and is a member of various golf courses including; Huntercombe, Queenwood and Sunningdale. He has competed in the Dunhill Links Championship and has won the scratch medal at Huntercombe. He states that he never confined himself to playing tennis, and enjoyed soccer, cricket, rugby and golf.

In March 2025, he was named the Vice Captain of Team Europe in the Laver Cup, which was held in San Francisco in September that year.

== Equipment ==
Henman's clothing was manufactured by Adidas and he wore Adidas Equipment Barricade shoes. He used Slazenger Pro Braided racquets.

== Significant finals ==
=== Olympic finals ===
==== Doubles: 1 (0–1) ====
Result	Year	Tournament	Surface	Partner	Opponents	Score
Silver	1996	Atlanta, United States	Hard	(United Kingdom) Neil Broad	(Australia) Todd Woodbridge (Australia) Mark Woodforde	4–6, 4–6, 2–6

=== Masters Series finals ===
==== Singles: 4 (1–3) ====
Result	Year	Tournament	Surface	Opponent	Score
Loss	2000	Cincinnati Masters	Hard	(Sweden) Thomas Enqvist	6–7^{(5–7)}, 4–6
Loss	2002	Indian Wells Masters	Hard	(Australia) Lleyton Hewitt	1–6, 2–6
Win	2003	Paris Masters	Carpet (i)	(Romania) Andrei Pavel	6–2, 7–6^{(8–6)}, 7–6^{(7–2)}
Loss	2004	Indian Wells Masters	Hard	(Switzerland) Roger Federer	3–6, 3–6

==== Doubles: 2 (2–0) ====
Result	Year	Tournament	Surface	Partner	Opponents	Score
Win	1999	Monte-Carlo Masters	Clay	(France) Olivier Delaître	(Czech Republic) Jiří Novák (Czech Republic) David Rikl	6–2, 6–3
Win	2004	Monte-Carlo Masters	Clay	(Serbia and Montenegro) Nenad Zimonjić	(Argentina) Gastón Etlis (Argentina) Martín Rodríguez	7–5, 6–2

== ATP career finals ==
=== Singles: 28 (11 titles, 17 runners-up) ===
Legend Grand Slam tournaments (0–0) Tennis Masters Cup (0–0) ATP Super 9 / ATP Masters Series (1–3) ATP Championship Series / ATP International Series Gold (1–5) ATP World Series / ATP International Series (9–8)	Titles by surface Hard (9–12) Clay (0–0) Grass (0–3) Carpet (2–3)	Titles by setting Outdoor (5–12) Indoor (6–5)

Result	W–L	Date	Tournament	Tier	Surface	Opponent	Score
Loss	0–1	Jan 1997	Qatar Open, Qatar	World Series	Hard	(United States) Jim Courier	5–7, 7–6^{(7–5)}, 2–6
Win	1–1	Jan 1997	Sydney International, Australia	World Series	Hard	(Spain) Carlos Moyá	6–3, 6–1
Loss	1–2	Feb 1997	ECC Antwerp, Belgium	Champ. Series	Hard (i)	(Switzerland) Marc Rosset	2–6, 5–7, 4–6
Win	2–2	Sep 1997	President's Cup, Uzbekistan	World Series	Hard	(Switzerland) Marc Rosset	7–6^{(7–2)}, 6–4
Loss	2–3	Jan 1998	Sydney International, Australia	World Series	Hard	(Slovakia) Karol Kučera	5–7, 4–6
Loss	2–4	Aug 1998	Los Angeles Open, US	World Series	Hard	(United States) Andre Agassi	4–6, 4–6
Win	3–4	Sep 1998	President's Cup, Uzbekistan (2)	World Series	Hard	(Russia) Yevgeny Kafelnikov	7–5, 6–4
Win	4–4	Oct 1998	Swiss Indoors, Switzerland	World Series	Carpet (i)	(United States) Andre Agassi	6–4, 6–3, 3–6, 6–4
Loss	4–5	Jan 1999	Qatar Open, Qatar	World Series	Hard	(Germany) Rainer Schüttler	4–6, 7–5, 1–6
Loss	4–6	Feb 1999	Rotterdam Open, Netherlands	Champ. Series	Carpet (i)	(Russia) Yevgeny Kafelnikov	2–6, 6–7^{(3–7)}
Loss	4–7	Jun 1999	Queen's Club Championships, UK	World Series	Grass	(United States) Pete Sampras	7–6^{(7–1)}, 4–6, 6–7^{(4–7)}
Loss	4–8	Oct 1999	Swiss Indoors, Switzerland	World Series	Carpet (i)	(Slovakia) Karol Kučera	4–6, 6–7^{(10–12)}, 6–4, 6–4, 6–7^{(2–7)}
Loss	4–9	Feb 2000	Rotterdam Open, Netherlands	Intl. Gold	Hard (i)	(France) Cédric Pioline	7–6^{(7–3)}, 4–6, 6–7^{(4–7)}
Loss	4–10	Mar 2000	Scottsdale Open, US	International	Hard	(Australia) Lleyton Hewitt	4–6, 6–7^{(2–7)}
Loss	4–11	Aug 2000	Cincinnati Masters, US	Masters Series	Hard	(Sweden) Thomas Enqvist	6–7^{(5–7)}, 4–6
Win	5–11	Oct 2000	Vienna Open, Austria	Intl. Gold	Hard (i)	(Germany) Tommy Haas	6–4, 6–4, 6–4
Win	6–11	Nov 2000	Brighton International, UK	International	Hard (i)	(Slovakia) Dominik Hrbatý	6–2, 6–2
Win	7–11	Feb 2001	Copenhagen Open, Denmark	International	Hard (i)	(Sweden) Andreas Vinciguerra	6–3, 6–4
Loss	7–12	Jun 2001	Queen's Club Championships, UK	International	Grass	(Australia) Lleyton Hewitt	6–7^{(3–7)}, 6–7^{(3–7)}
Win	8–12	Oct 2001	Swiss Indoors, Switzerland (2)	International	Hard (i)	(Switzerland) Roger Federer	6–3, 6–4, 6–2
Win	9–12	Jan 2002	Adelaide International, Australia	International	Hard	(Australia) Mark Philippoussis	6–4, 6–7^{(6–8)}, 6–3
Loss	9–13	Feb 2002	Rotterdam Open, Netherlands	Intl. Gold	Hard (i)	(France) Nicolas Escudé	6–3, 6–7^{(7–9)}, 4–6
Loss	9–14	Mar 2002	Indian Wells Masters, US	Masters Series	Hard	(Australia) Lleyton Hewitt	1–6, 2–6
Loss	9–15	Jun 2002	Queen's Club Championships, UK	International	Grass	(Australia) Lleyton Hewitt	6–4, 1–6, 4–6
Win	10–15	Aug 2003	Washington Open, US	International	Hard	(Chile) Fernando González	6–3, 6–4
Win	11–15	Nov 2003	Paris Masters, France	Masters Series	Carpet (i)	(Romania) Andrei Pavel	6–2, 7–6^{(8–6)}, 7–6^{(7–2)}
Loss	11–16	Mar 2004	Indian Wells Masters, US	Masters Series	Hard	(Switzerland) Roger Federer	3–6, 3–6
Loss	11–17	Oct 2006	Japan Open, Japan	Intl. Gold	Hard	(Switzerland) Roger Federer	3–6, 3–6

=== Doubles: 6 (4 titles, 2 runners-up) ===
Legend Grand Slam tournaments (0–0) Tennis Masters Cup (0–0) ATP Super 9 / ATP Masters Series (2–0) Olympic Games (0–1) ATP Championship Series / ATP International Series Gold (1–1) ATP World Series / ATP International Series (1–0)	Titles by surface Hard (0–2) Clay (2–0) Grass (0–0) Carpet (2–0)	Titles by setting Outdoor (2–1) Indoor (2–1)

Result	W–L	Date	Tournament	Tier	Surface	Partner	Opponents	Score
Loss	0–1	Aug 1996	Olympic Games, US	Olympics	Hard	(United Kingdom) Neil Broad	(Australia) Todd Woodbridge (Australia) Mark Woodforde	4–6, 4–6, 2–6
Win	1–1	Oct 1997	Swiss Indoors, Switzerland	World Series	Carpet (i)	(Switzerland) Marc Rosset	(Germany) Karsten Braasch (United States) Jim Grabb	7–6, 6–7, 7–6
Win	2–1	Feb 1999	London Indoor, UK	Champ. Series	Carpet (i)	(United Kingdom) Greg Rusedski	(Zimbabwe) Byron Black (South Africa) Wayne Ferreira	6–3, 7–6^{(8–6)}
Win	3–1	Apr 1999	Monte-Carlo Masters, Monaco	Super 9	Clay	(France) Olivier Delaître	(Czech Republic) Jiří Novák (Czech Republic) David Rikl	6–2, 6–3
Loss	3–2	Feb 2000	Rotterdam Open, Netherlands	Intl. Gold	Hard (i)	(Russia) Yevgeny Kafelnikov	(South Africa) David Adams (South Africa) John-Laffnie de Jager	7–5, 2–6, 3–6
Win	4–2	Apr 2004	Monte-Carlo Masters, Monaco (2)	Masters Series	Clay	(Serbia and Montenegro) Nenad Zimonjić	(Argentina) Gastón Etlis (Argentina) Martín Rodríguez	7–5, 6–2

== Singles performance timeline ==
Key
W	F	SF	QF	#R	RR	Q#	P#	DNQ	A	Z#	PO	G	S	B	NMS	NTI	P	NH

(W) winner; (F) finalist; (SF) semifinalist; (QF) quarterfinalist; (#R) rounds 4, 3, 2, 1; (RR) round-robin stage; (Q#) qualification round; (DNQ) did not qualify; (A) absent; (NH) not held; (SR) strike rate (events won / competed); (W–L) win–loss record.

Tournament	1992	1993	1994	1995	1996	1997	1998	1999	2000	2001	2002	2003	2004	2005	2006	2007	SR	W–L	Win %
Grand Slam tournaments
Australian Open	A	A	A	A	2R	3R	1R	3R	4R	4R	4R	A	3R	3R	1R	A	0 / 10	18–10	64%
French Open	A	A	Q1	Q2	1R	1R	1R	3R	3R	3R	2R	3R	SF	2R	2R	1R	0 / 12	16–12	57%
Wimbledon	Q1	Q2	1R	2R	QF	QF	SF	SF	4R	SF	SF	QF	QF	2R	2R	2R	0 / 14	43–14	75%
US Open	A	A	A	2R	4R	2R	4R	1R	3R	3R	3R	1R	SF	1R	2R	2R	0 / 13	21–13	62%
Win–loss	0–0	0–0	0–1	2–2	8–4	7–4	8–4	9–4	10–4	12–4	11–4	6–3	16–4	4–4	3–4	2–3	0 / 49	98–49	67%
Year End Championships
Tennis Masters Cup	Did not qualify					RR	SF	Did not qualify					RR	Did not qualify			0 / 3	4–4	50%
Grand Slam Cup	Did not qualify				SF	DNQ	1R	DNQ	Not Held								0 / 2	2–2	50%
ATP Masters Series
Indian Wells Masters	A	A	A	A	A	A	1R	QF	2R	3R	F	2R	F	QF	2R	1R	0 / 10	20–10	67%
Miami Masters	A	A	A	A	2R	1R	SF	3R	QF	2R	4R	2R	2R	QF	3R	1R	0 / 12	16–12	57%
Monte-Carlo Masters	A	A	A	A	A	A	1R	2R	2R	QF	SF	A	QF	1R	1R	1R	0 / 9	11–9	55%
Rome Masters	A	A	A	A	A	2R	2R	3R	2R	2R	1R	1R	3R	3R	3R	1R	0 / 11	12–11	52%
Hamburg Masters	A	A	A	A	A	A	2R	QF	3R	1R	2R	3R	2R	3R	A	A	0 / 8	11–8	58%
Canada Masters	A	A	A	A	3R	1R	SF	2R	1R	2R	3R	2R	2R	1R	2R	A	0 / 11	10–11	48%
Cincinnati Masters	A	A	A	A	2R	1R	1R	QF	F	SF	2R	1R	3R	2R	1R	1R	0 / 12	16–12	57%
Madrid Masters (Note: Stuttgart from 1995 to 2001, and Madrid from 2002 onwards.)	A	A	A	A	1R	3R	2R	2R	3R	QF	2R	1R	3R	2R	3R	A	0 / 11	10–11	48%
Paris Masters	A	A	A	A	1R	2R	2R	3R	2R	2R	3R	W	3R	A	A	A	1 / 9	10–8	56%
Win–loss	0–0	0–0	0–0	0–0	3–5	4–6	11–9	10–9	14–9	13–9	16–9	10–7	16–9	12–8	8–7	0–5	1 / 93	116–92	56%
Career Statistics
Titles–Finals	0–0	0–0	0–0	0–0	0–2	2–2	2–4	0–4	2–5	3–4	0–3	2–2	0–1	0–0	0–1	0–0	11 / 28	11–17	39%
Year-end ranking	778	372	167	95	29	17	7	11	10	9	8	15	6	36	39	292	$11,635,542		

== Top 10 wins ==
Season	1992	1993	1994	1995	1996	1997	1998	1999	2000	2001	2002	2003	2004	2005	2006	2007	Total
Wins	0	0	0	0	2	5	9	2	6	0	3	4	3	0	1	0	35

#	Player	Rank	Event	Surface	Rd	Score
1996
1.	(Russia) Yevgeny Kafelnikov	5	Wimbledon, London, United Kingdom	Grass	1R	7–6^{(8–6)}, 6–3, 6–7^{(2–7)}, 4–6, 7–5
2.	(South Africa) Wayne Ferreira	7	Ostrava, Czech Republic	Carpet (i)	QF	6–4, 6–3
1997
3.	(Croatia) Goran Ivanišević	3	Sydney, Australia	Hard	SF	4–6, 7–6^{(7–1)}, 6–1
4.	(Netherlands) Richard Krajicek	5	Wimbledon, London, United Kingdom	Grass	4R	7–6^{(9–7)}, 6–7^{(7–9)}, 7–6^{(7–5)}, 6–4
5.	(Austria) Thomas Muster	5	US Open, New York, United States	Hard	1R	6–3, 7–6^{(7–3)}, 4–6, 6–4
6.	(Croatia) Goran Ivanišević	4	Stuttgart, Germany	Carpet (i)	2R	6–3, 2–0, ret.
7.	(Russia) Yevgeny Kafelnikov	6	ATP Tour World Championships, Hanover, Germany	Hard (i)	RR	6–4, 6–4
1998
8.	(Australia) Pat Rafter	2	Sydney, Australia	Hard	SF	7–6^{(7–5)}, 7–5
9.	(Netherlands) Richard Krajicek	10	London, United Kingdom	Carpet (i)	1R	6–7^{(5–7)}, 7–6^{(7–2)}, 7–5
10.	(Czech Republic) Petr Korda	2	Miami, United States	Hard	4R	6–4, 6–4
11.	(Australia) Pat Rafter	6	Wimbledon, London, United Kingdom	Grass	4R	6–3, 6–7^{(3–7)}, 6–3, 6–2
12.	(Czech Republic) Petr Korda	3	Wimbledon, London, United Kingdom	Grass	QF	6–3, 6–4, 6–2
13.	(Russia) Yevgeny Kafelnikov	10	Tashkent, Uzbekistan	Hard	F	7–5, 6–4
14.	(United States) Andre Agassi	8	Basel, Switzerland	Hard (i)	F	6–4, 6–3, 3–6, 6–4
15.	(Chile) Marcelo Ríos	2	ATP Tour World Championships, Hanover, Germany	Hard (i)	RR	7–5, 6–1
16.	(Spain) Àlex Corretja	6	ATP Tour World Championships, Hanover, Germany	Hard (i)	RR	7–6^{(7–4)}, 6–7^{(4–7)}, 6–2
1999
17.	(United Kingdom) Greg Rusedski	10	Indian Wells, United States	Hard	3R	6–4, 2–6, 6–4
18.	(United States) Todd Martin	8	Davis Cup, Birmingham, United Kingdom	Hard (i)	RR	4–6, 7–5, 6–3, 7–6^{(7–4)}
2000
19.	(Russia) Yevgeny Kafelnikov	2	Rotterdam, Netherlands	Hard (i)	SF	6–3, 4–6, 6–3
20.	(Ecuador) Nicolás Lapentti	8	Scottsdale, United States	Hard	QF	6–3, 6–2
21.	(Chile) Marcelo Ríos	8	Miami, United States	Hard	4R	6–1, 1–6, 7–6^{(7–4)}
22.	(United States) Pete Sampras	2	Cincinnati, United States	Hard	3R	6–3, 6–4
23.	(Brazil) Gustavo Kuerten	4	Cincinnati, United States	Hard	SF	6–7^{(11–13)}, 6–3, 7–6^{(7–0)}
24.	(Russia) Yevgeny Kafelnikov	5	Indianapolis, United States	Hard	QF	7–6^{(7–4)}, 6–2
2002
25.	(Russia) Marat Safin	8	Indian Wells, United States	Hard	3R	7–6^{(7–3)}, 6–4
26.	(Sweden) Thomas Johansson	9	Monte Carlo, Monaco	Clay	QF	2–6, 6–4, 7–6^{(7–4)}
27.	(Russia) Yevgeny Kafelnikov	5	World Team Cup, Düsseldorf, Germany	Clay	RR	6–2, 7–6^{(8–6)}
2003
28.	(Argentina) David Nalbandian	9	Wimbledon, London, United Kingdom	Grass	4R	6–2, 6–7^{(4–7)}, 7–5, 6–3
29.	(United States) Andy Roddick	6	Washington, D.C., United States	Hard	SF	1–6, 6–3, 7–6^{(7–1)}
30.	(Switzerland) Roger Federer	3	Paris, France	Carpet (i)	QF	7–6^{(7–5)}, 6–1
31.	(United States) Andy Roddick	2	Paris, France	Carpet (i)	SF	7–6^{(7–4)}, 7–6^{(9–7)}
2004
32.	(Switzerland) Roger Federer	1	Rotterdam, Netherlands	Hard (i)	QF	6–3, 7–6^{(11–9)}
33.	(United States) Andy Roddick	3	Indian Wells, United States	Hard	QF	6–7^{(6–8)}, 7–6^{(7–1)}, 6–3
34.	(Argentina) Guillermo Coria	6	Tennis Masters Cup, Houston, United States	Hard	RR	6–2, 6–2
2006
35.	(Croatia) Mario Ančić	10	Tokyo, Japan	Hard	QF	6–2, 6–2

== Bibliography ==
- Felstein, Simon (2005). Tim Henman: England's Finest. John Blake Publishing. ISBN 978-1-84454-111-9.

Awards and achievements
Preceded by Thomas Enqvist	ATP Most Improved Player; 1996	Succeeded by Patrick Rafter
