= Abdul Hamid Makhkamov =

Uzbekistani tennis player

- Country (sports): Uzbekistan
- Born: 11 February 1976 (age 49)
- Prize money: $24,733

Singles
- Career record: 0–1
- Highest ranking: No. 688 (13 Nov 2000)

Doubles
- Career record: 0–3
- Highest ranking: No. 345 (22 Jul 2002)

Abdul Hamid Makhkamov (born 11 February 1976) is an Uzbekistani former professional tennis player.

Makhkamov had best world rankings of 688 in singles and 345 in doubles. He featured in three editions of the President's Cup in Tashkent, including the singles main draw in 1997. As a doubles player he won one ITF Futures title and was runner-up at the 2001 Togliatti Challenger. He has served as non playing captain of the Uzbekistan Davis Cup team.

== ATP Challenger/ITF Futures finals ==
=== Doubles: 5 (1–4) ===
Legend
ATP Challenger (0–1)
ITF Futures (1–3)

Result	W–L	Date	Tournament	Tier	Surface	Partner	Opponents	Score
Loss	0–1	Aug 2000	Russia F1, Balashikha	Futures	Clay	(Russia) Sergei Pozdnev	(Kazakhstan) Alexey Kedryuk (United States) Oren Motevassel	3–6, 2–6
Loss	0–2	Oct 2000	Uzbekistan F4, Karshi	Futures	Hard	(Uzbekistan) Dmitri Tomashevich	(Slovakia) Viktor Bruthans (Slovakia) Branislav Sekáč	2–6, 2–6
Loss	0–3	Oct 2001	Uzbekistan F4, Guliston	Futures	Hard	(Uzbekistan) Anton Kokurin	(Kazakhstan) Alexey Kedryuk (Uzbekistan) Dmitri Tomashevich	W/O
Win	1–3	Jul 2001	Georgia F1, Tbilisi	Futures	Clay	(Russia) Artem Derepasko	(Russia) Alexander Sikanov (Ukraine) Aleksandr Yarmola	7–5, 6–2
Loss	0–1	Aug 2001	Togliatti Challenger, Togliatti	Challenger	Hard	(Uzbekistan) Dmitri Tomashevich	(Slovakia) Karol Beck (Slovakia) Igor Zelenay	5–7, 6–4, 3–6
