= Vincenzo Santopadre =

Italian tennis player

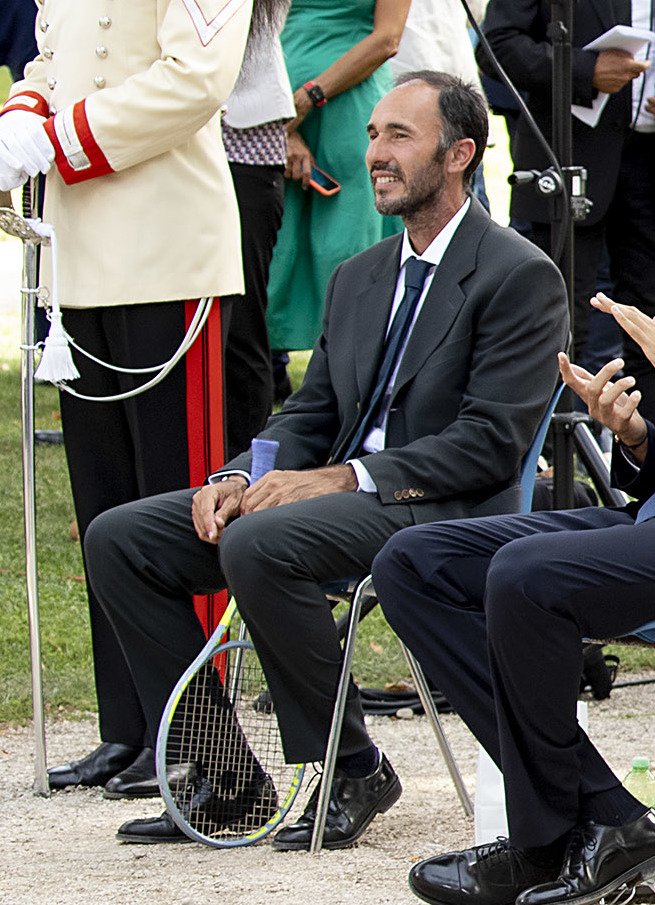
- Santopadre in 2021
- Country (sports): Italy
- Residence: Rome, Italy
- Born: 11 August 1971 (age 53); Rome, Italy
- Turned pro: 1991
- Retired: 2005
- Plays: Left-handed (one-handed backhand)
- Prize money: $619,300

Singles
- Career record: 17–29
- Career titles: 0
- Highest ranking: No. 100 (3 May 1999)

Grand Slam singles results
- Australian Open: Q3 (2000)
- French Open: Q3 (1998, 1999, 2000)
- Wimbledon: 1R (1999)
- US Open: Q3 (1999, 2003)

Doubles
- Career record: 17–25
- Career titles: 1
- Highest ranking: No. 103 (24 August 1998)

Grand Slam doubles results
- French Open: 1R (1998)
- Wimbledon: 2R (2000)
- US Open: 1R (1996)

Vincenzo Santopadre (born 11 August 1971) is an Italian former professional tennis player and a coach.

== Coaching career ==
Since 2011 till the end of 2023, he was the coach of Matteo Berrettini, who has been ranked number 6 ATP, runner-up at Wimbledon, semifinalist at the US Open and the third Italian tennis player in history to have qualified for the ATP Finals.

== Tennis career ==
Santopadre reached a career high World No. 100 on 3 May 1999. He won one doubles title and achieved a career-high doubles ranking of world no. 103 on 24 August 1998. At the Rome Masters, Santopadre achieved victories over 10th seed Karol Kucera in 1998 and defending champion Magnus Norman in 2001.

He reached the semifinals of Bournemouth in 1998 and the quarterfinals of Chennai and Munich in 1999, defeating Gustavo Kuerten in the latter. He is the son-in-law of former Poland international footballer Zbigniew Boniek.

== Career finals ==
=== Doubles (1 title, 1 runner-up) ===
Result	W/L	Date	Tournament	Surface	Partner	Opponents	Score
Win	1–0	1997	Tashkent, Uzbekistan	Hard	(United States) Vincent Spadea	(Morocco) Hicham Arazi (Israel) Eyal Ran	6–4, 6–7, 6–0
Loss	1–1	1999	Casablanca, Morocco	Clay	(Italy) Massimo Ardinghi	(Brazil) Fernando Meligeni (Brazil) Jaime Oncins	2–6, 3–6
