= Nir Welgreen =

Israeli tennis player (born 1976)

- Full name: Nir Welgreen Bercovich
- Native name: ניר וולגרין
- Country (sports): Israel
- Born: 17 December 1976 (age 48)
- Prize money: $99,926

Singles
- Career record: 2–5
- Highest ranking: No. 229 (14 October 1996)

Doubles
- Career record: 3–4
- Highest ranking: No. 163 (15 March 1999)

Nir Welgreen (Hebrew: ניר וולגרין; born 17 December 1976) is a former professional tennis player from Israel.

== Biography ==
Born in 1976, Welgreen began competing in satellite tournaments in the 1992 season.

His best performances on the ATP Tour were second round appearances at both Long Island in 1996 and Tashkent in 1997. At Tashkent he also made the semi-finals of the doubles in 1998, Vadim Kutsenko.

During his career he took part in several grand slam qualifying draws, including the 1999 Wimbledon Championships.

He won three ITF singles titles, two in Turkey and one in Ireland.

In doubles he had a top 200 ranking and claimed two Challenger titles.

== Challenger titles ==
=== Doubles: (2) ===
No.	Year	Tournament	Surface	Partner	Opponents	Score
1.	1998	Ahmedabad, India	Hard	(Israel) Noam Okun	(Israel) Noam Behr (Israel) Eyal Ran	3–6, 6–0, 6–4
2.	1999	Calcutta, India	Grass	(Israel) Andy Ram	(France) Grégory Carraz (France) Guillaume Marx	2–1 (RET)
