= Eyal Ran =

Israeli tennis player (born 1972)

- Native name: אייל רן
- Country (sports): Israel
- Born: 21 November 1972 (age 53) Qiryat Ono, Israel

Singles
- Career record: 16–39
- Career titles: 0
- Highest ranking: No. 138 (21 April 1997)

Doubles
- Career record: 31–62
- Career titles: 1
- Highest ranking: No. 71 (11 October 1999)

Eyal Ran (Hebrew: אייל רן; born 21 November 1972) is an Israeli former professional tennis player and former captain of the Israel Davis Cup team.

His career high ATP ranking in singles was 138 (21 April 1997), and in doubles it was 71 (11 October 1999).

== Early life ==
Ran was born in Qiryat Ono, Israel, and is Jewish. His father emigrated to Israel from Romania.

== Tennis career ==
Ran trained at Israel Tennis Centers. He turned pro in 1992.

In August 1993 he upset Jonas Svensson of Sweden, ranked # 37 in the world, in Long Island, New York, 6–1, 6–3.

After playing at the Australian Open in 1996 and 1997 in the singles competition (he lost in the 2nd round both years), Ran played in his first doubles Grand Slam in 1999, reaching the 2nd round at the French Open (he lost in the first round at Wimbledon and the U.S. Open).

The following year, he played doubles in all four Grand Slam events, reaching the 2nd round at Wimbledon, but losing in the first round of the other three tournaments. In 2000 he won a clay court doubles tournament in Bucharest with Alberto Martin. In 2001, Ran reached the 2nd round at the Australian Open, but lost in the first round of the French Open and Wimbledon (with partner Noam Behr).

He often played Challengers and qualifying tournaments for major events.

=== Davis Cup ===
He also played on the Israel Davis Cup team.

=== Davis Cup captain ===
In 2005, at the peak of a disagreement between the Israeli Davis Cup players and the Israel Tennis Association, Ran was made Israeli Davis Cup captain. Ran spoke to the players and the Association and settled the crisis.

Israel (ranked 8th in the Davis Cup standings, with 5,394 points) hosted heavily favored Russia (which won in both 2002 and 2006, and was the top-ranked country in Davis Cup standings, with 27,897 points) in a Davis Cup quarterfinal tie in July 2009, on indoor hard courts at the Nokia Arena in Tel Aviv. Israel was represented by Dudi Sela, Andy Ram, Jonathan Erlich, and Harel Levy. Russia's lineup consisted of Marat Safin (# 24 in the world; former world # 1), Igor Andreev (26), Igor Kunitsyn (35), and Mikhail Youzhny (44; former world # 8). The stage was set by Safin, who prior to the tie told the press: "With all due respect, Israel was lucky to get to the quarterfinals." The Israeli team's response was to beat the Russian team in each of their first three matches, thereby winning the tie. Levy, world # 210, beat Russia's top player, Andreev, world # 24, 6–4, 6–2, 4–6, 6–2 in the opening match. Sela (# 33) followed by beating Russian Youzhny 3–6, 6–1, 6–0, 7–5. Ran likened his players to two fighter jets on court, saying: "I felt as if I had two F-16s out there today, they played amazingly well." The 10,500 spectators were the largest crowd ever for a tennis match in Israel. The next day Ram and Erlich beat Safin and Kunitsyn 6–3, 6–4, 6–7^{(3)}, 4–6, 6–4 in front of a boisterous crowd of over 10,000. Even the Saudi Gazette described the doubles match as a "thrilling" win. With the tie clinched for Israel, the reverse singles rubbers were "dead", and instead of best-of-five matches, best-of-three sets were played, with the outcomes of little to no importance. Israel wrapped up a 4–1 victory over Russia, as Levy defeated Kunitsyn 6–4, 4–6, 7–6^{(2)}, while Sela retired with a wrist injury while down 3–4 in the first set against Andreev. In the subsequent Spain defeated Israel in Israel's first appearance in the Davis Cup semifinals. In 2010, Israel lost to Chile in the first round, and to Austria in the playoffs, participated in the Europe/Africa Group I in 2011.

In 2017, after 12 years at the helm, he retired as captain. Ran said: "I’m happy I guided the team to the Davis Cup semifinals and for the privilege I had of coaching players like Andy Ram, Yoni Erlich, Noam Okun, Amir Hadad, Harel Levy, Amir Weintraub and Dudi Sela to great achievements... I’m also happy I had the privilege of coaching Israel’s future team: Yshai Oliel, Edan Leshem, Daniel Cukierman, Ben Patael and Mor Bulis...."

== See also ==
- List of select Jewish tennis players
