= 1999 Wimbledon Championships – Women's singles qualifying =

Women's singles qualifying
- 1999 Wimbledon Championships

Events
Singles	men	women		boys	girls
Doubles	men	women	mixed	boys	girls
WC Singles	men	women	quad
WC Doubles	men	women	quad
Legends	men	women	seniors

Qualification
Singles	men	women
Doubles	men	women
- Wimbledon Championships

Players and pairs who neither have high enough rankings nor receive wild cards may participate in a qualifying tournament held one week before the annual Wimbledon Tennis Championships.

== Seeds ==
1. (United States) Alexandra Stevenson (qualified)
2. (Russia) Elena Dementieva (qualifying competition, lucky loser)
3. (Germany) Miriam Schnitzer (first round)
4. (Japan) Nana Miyagi (second round)
5. (Austria) Patricia Wartusch (first round)
6. (Hungary) Anna Földényi (qualified)
7. (Germany) Anca Barna (first round)
8. (Italy) Tathiana Garbin (second round)
9. (Russia) Elena Makarova (second round)
10. (South Africa) Surina de Beer (second round)
11. (Slovenia) Tina Pisnik (first round)
12. (Argentina) Florencia Labat (first round)
13. (Netherlands) Seda Noorlander (qualified)
14. (Australia) Jelena Dokic (qualified)
15. (Russia) Nadia Petrova (qualified)
16. (Czech Republic) Adriana Gerši (first round)

== Qualifiers ==
1. (United States) Alexandra Stevenson
2. (United States) Erika deLone
3. (Belgium) Kim Clijsters
4. (Australia) Jelena Dokic
5. (United States) Linda Wild
6. (Russia) Nadia Petrova
7. (Hungary) Anna Földényi
8. (Netherlands) Seda Noorlander

== Lucky loser ==
1. (Russia) Elena Dementieva

== Qualifying draw ==
=== First qualifier ===
First round
1	(United States) Alexandra Stevenson	6	7
(United States) Sandra Cacic	3	5
(South Africa) Liezel Horn	6	1	4
(Australia) Annabel Ellwood	4	6	6
(Japan) Haruka Inoue	3	6	8
(Australia) Cindy Watson	6	2	6
(Israel) Hila Rosen	4	6^{4}
10	(South Africa) Surina de Beer	6	7^{7}

Second round
1	(United States) Alexandra Stevenson	6	6
(Australia) Annabel Ellwood	3	4
(Japan) Haruka Inoue	6	3	6
10	(South Africa) Surina de Beer	3	6	4

Qualifying competition
1	(United States) Alexandra Stevenson	6	6
(Japan) Haruka Inoue	1	4

=== Second qualifier ===
First round
11	(Slovenia) Tina Pisnik	4	7	5
(Japan) Shinobu Asagoe	6	5	7
(South Korea) Park Sung-hee	5	7	5
(Switzerland) Miroslava Vavrinec	7	5	7
WC	(United Kingdom) Nicola Payne	7	5	6
WC	(United Kingdom) Heather Matthews	5	7	2
(United States) Erika deLone	5	3
5	(Austria) Patricia Wartusch	7	6

Second round
(Japan) Shinobu Asagoe	6	6
(Switzerland) Miroslava Vavrinec	4	1
WC	(United Kingdom) Nicola Payne	2	4
(United States) Erika deLone	6	6

Qualifying competition
(Japan) Shinobu Asagoe	4	4
(United States) Erika deLone	6	6

=== Third qualifier ===
First round
3	(Germany) Miriam Schnitzer	3	2
(United States) Mashona Washington	6	6
WC	(United Kingdom) Lizzie Jelfs	6^{4}	4
(Italy) Francesca Lubiani	7^{7}	6
WC	(United Kingdom) Victoria Davies	7^{7}	6
WC	(United Kingdom) Kate Warne-Holland	6^{4}	4
(Belgium) Kim Clijsters	6	6
16	(Czech Republic) Adriana Gerši	2	2

Second round
(United States) Mashona Washington	4	2
(Italy) Francesca Lubiani	6	6
WC	(United Kingdom) Victoria Davies	1	1
(Belgium) Kim Clijsters	6	6

Qualifying competition
(Italy) Francesca Lubiani	0	4
(Belgium) Kim Clijsters	6	6

=== Fourth qualifier ===
First round
14	(Australia) Jelena Dokic	6	6
(Belgium) Patty Van Acker	4	4
(United States) Jill Craybas	4	2
(Austria) Evelyn Fauth	6	6
(Australia) Rennae Stubbs	6	6
WC	(United Kingdom) Helen Crook	2	4
(United States) Samantha Reeves	6	6
7	(Germany) Anca Barna	4	1

Second round
14	(Australia) Jelena Dokic	6	6
(Austria) Evelyn Fauth	0	1
(Australia) Rennae Stubbs	7^{10}	6
(United States) Samantha Reeves	6^{8}	3

Qualifying competition
14	(Australia) Jelena Dokic	6	7^{7}
(Australia) Rennae Stubbs	2	6^{2}

=== Fifth qualifier ===
First round
8	(Italy) Tathiana Garbin	6	4	6
(Australia) Lisa McShea	3	6	3
(Australia) Evie Dominikovic	2	1
(United States) Linda Wild	6	6
(Japan) Yuka Yoshida	6	6
(Spain) Rosa María Andrés Rodríguez	3	0
WC	(United Kingdom) Hannah Collin	3^{r}
9	(Russia) Elena Makarova	5

Second round
8	(Italy) Tathiana Garbin	4	4
(United States) Linda Wild	6	6
(Japan) Yuka Yoshida	6	6
9	(Russia) Elena Makarova	3	3

Qualifying competition
(United States) Linda Wild	0	6	7
(Japan) Yuka Yoshida	6	3	5

=== Sixth qualifier ===
First round
15	(Russia) Nadia Petrova	6	6
(India) Nirupama Vaidyanathan	4	4
(Australia) Catherine Barclay	3	2
(Croatia) Jelena Kostanić	6	6
(Hungary) Katalin Marosi	6	6
WC	(United Kingdom) Louise Herbert	0	4
(Spain) Eva Bes	3	2
4	(Japan) Nana Miyagi	6	6

Second round
15	(Russia) Nadia Petrova	6	6
(Croatia) Jelena Kostanić	3	0
(Hungary) Katalin Marosi	7^{11}	3	6
4	(Japan) Nana Miyagi	6^{9}	6	4

Qualifying competition
15	(Russia) Nadia Petrova	7	6
(Hungary) Katalin Marosi	5	3

=== Seventh qualifier ===
First round
6	(Hungary) Anna Földényi	6	6
(Paraguay) Larissa Schaerer	1	4
(Slovenia) Tina Križan	3	2
(Poland) Aleksandra Olsza	6	6
(Germany) Jana Kandarr	2	6	6
(Italy) Antonella Serra Zanetti	6	4	1
(Russia) Alina Jidkova	6	7
12	(Argentina) Florencia Labat	3	5

Second round
6	(Hungary) Anna Földényi	7^{7}	4	6
(Poland) Aleksandra Olsza	6^{3}	6	4
(Germany) Jana Kandarr	5	7^{7}	6
(Russia) Alina Jidkova	7	6^{1}	2

Qualifying competition
6	(Hungary) Anna Földényi	7^{8}	3	6
(Germany) Jana Kandarr	6^{6}	6	4

=== Eighth qualifier ===
First round
13	(Netherlands) Seda Noorlander	7^{7}	7
(Germany) Julia Abe	6^{2}	5
(South Africa) Jessica Steck	7	5	2
(Kazakhstan) Irina Selyutina	5	7	6
(United States) Karin Miller	6	7
(Hungary) Nóra Köves	2	5
(Brazil) Vanessa Menga	0	1
2	(Russia) Elena Dementieva	6	6

Second round
13	(Netherlands) Seda Noorlander	6	7
(Kazakhstan) Irina Selyutina	3	5
(United States) Karin Miller	1	2
2	(Russia) Elena Dementieva	6	6

Qualifying competition
13	(Netherlands) Seda Noorlander	7	5	6
2	(Russia) Elena Dementieva	5	7	4
