= 1998 Australian Open – Men's singles qualifying =

Men's singles qualifying
- 1998 Australian Open

Events
Singles	men	women		boys	girls
Doubles	men	women	mixed	boys	girls
WC Singles	men	women	quad
WC Doubles	men	women	quad
Legends	men	women	mixed

Qualification
Singles	men	women
- Australian Open

This article displays the qualifying draw for the men's singles main draw at the 1998 Australian Open.

== Seeds ==
1. (France) Jérôme Golmard (qualified)
2. (Belgium) Dick Norman (first round)
3. (Germany) Rainer Schüttler (second round)
4. (Spain) Jacobo Díaz (qualified)
5. (Netherlands) Dennis van Scheppingen (qualified)
6. (Spain) Fernando Vicente (second round)
7. (United States) Steve Campbell (qualified)
8. (Spain) Álex López Morón (qualifying competition)
9. (Netherlands) John van Lottum (first round)
10. (Argentina) Gastón Etlis (first round)
11. (Italy) Marzio Martelli (qualified)
12. (Belgium) Christophe Van Garsse (qualified)
13. (France) Olivier Delaître (qualifying competition)
14. (Italy) Cristiano Caratti (first round)
15. (Germany) Lars Burgsmüller (qualified)
16. (France) Sébastien Grosjean (second round)
17. (United Kingdom) Andrew Richardson (qualifying competition)
18. (Spain) Óscar Burrieza (first round)
19. (United States) David Wheaton (qualified)
20. (Romania) Adrian Voinea (withdrew)
21. (Italy) Marco Meneschincheri (first round)
22. (Germany) Dirk Dier (first round)
23. (United States) Michael Sell (second round)
24. (Romania) Ionuț Moldovan (first round)
25. (Sweden) Nicklas Kulti (first round)
26. (France) Gérard Solvès (first round)
27. (United Kingdom) Chris Wilkinson (first round)
28. (Brazil) André Sá (first round)
29. (United States) Doug Flach (second round)
30. (France) Jean-Baptiste Perlant (qualifying competition)
31. (South Africa) Neville Godwin (first round)
32. (Hungary) Attila Sávolt (first round)

== Qualifiers ==
1. (France) Jérôme Golmard
2. (United States) Jan-Michael Gambill
3. (Australia) Mark Draper
4. (Spain) Jacobo Díaz
5. (Netherlands) Dennis van Scheppingen
6. (Canada) Sébastien Lareau
7. (United States) Steve Campbell
8. (Sweden) Jan Apell
9. (Australia) Andrew Ilie
10. (United States) Brian MacPhie
11. (Italy) Marzio Martelli
12. (Belgium) Christophe Van Garsse
13. (Germany) Karsten Braasch
14. (United States) David Wheaton
15. (Germany) Lars Burgsmüller
16. (United States) David Witt

== Qualifying draw ==
Key

- Q = Qualifier
- WC = Wild card
- LL = Lucky loser
- Alt = Alternate
- ITF = ITF entry
- PR = Protected ranking
- SR = Special ranking
- SE = Special exempt
- JE = Junior exempt
- JR = Junior Accelerator Programme entrant
- CO = College Accelerator Programme entrant
- NG = Next Gen Accelerator Program entrant
- w/o = Walkover
- r = Retired
- d = Defaulted

=== First qualifier ===
First round
1	(France) Jérôme Golmard	6	7^{9}
(Croatia) Ivan Ljubičić	1	6^{7}
(Japan) Takao Suzuki	6	7
(Japan) Hideki Kaneko	4	5
(Australia) Wayne Arthurs	6	7^{8}
(France) Régis Lavergne	3	6^{6}
(Portugal) João Cunha-Silva	6	4	6
31	(South Africa) Neville Godwin	0	6	3

Second round
1	(France) Jérôme Golmard	6	6
(Japan) Takao Suzuki	4	4
(Australia) Wayne Arthurs	6	6
(Portugal) João Cunha-Silva	4	3

Qualifying competition
1	(France) Jérôme Golmard	6	3	6
(Australia) Wayne Arthurs	4	6	3

=== Second qualifier ===
First round
2	(Belgium) Dick Norman	6	3	4
(Australia) James Holmes	4	6	6
WC	(Australia) Peter Clarke	5	0
(Austria) Markus Hipfl	7	6
(France) Jean-François Bachelot	4	6	6
(Italy) Fabio Maggi	6	3	2
(United States) Jan-Michael Gambill	6	6
32	(Hungary) Attila Sávolt	3	2

Second round
(Australia) James Holmes	2	6	9
(Austria) Markus Hipfl	6	3	7
(France) Jean-François Bachelot	4	6	3
(United States) Jan-Michael Gambill	6	3	6

Qualifying competition
(Australia) James Holmes	6	1	3
(United States) Jan-Michael Gambill	3	6	6

=== Third qualifier ===
First round
3	(Germany) Rainer Schüttler	5	6
(Portugal) Nuno Marques	7	6^{r}
(Australia) Mark Draper	6	7^{8}
(South Africa) Louis Vosloo	4	6^{6}
(Italy) Filippo Messori	4	6	3
(Switzerland) Ivo Heuberger	6	4	6
(Croatia) Ivica Ančić	2	6^{6}
29	(United States) Doug Flach	6	7^{8}

Second round
3	(Germany) Rainer Schüttler	4	7	3
(Australia) Mark Draper	6	5	6
(Switzerland) Ivo Heuberger	6	7
29	(United States) Doug Flach	4	5

Qualifying competition
(Australia) Mark Draper	7	3	6
(Switzerland) Ivo Heuberger	5	6	3

=== Fourth qualifier ===
First round
4	(Spain) Jacobo Díaz	3	6	6
(Russia) Andrei Cherkasov	6	4	1
(Netherlands) Martijn Belgraver	6	7
(Croatia) Igor Šarić	1	5
(United Kingdom) Danny Sapsford	6^{5}	2
(Romania) Gabriel Trifu	7^{7}	6
(Socialist Federal Republic of Yugoslavia) Dušan Vemić	4	4
30	(France) Jean-Baptiste Perlant	6	6

Second round
4	(Spain) Jacobo Díaz	6	6
(Netherlands) Martijn Belgraver	4	4
(Romania) Gabriel Trifu	2	2
30	(France) Jean-Baptiste Perlant	6	6

Qualifying competition
4	(Spain) Jacobo Díaz	4	6	6
30	(France) Jean-Baptiste Perlant	6	4	4

=== Fifth qualifier ===
First round
5	(Netherlands) Dennis van Scheppingen	6	6
(United States) Glenn Weiner	4	3
(Australia) Joseph Sirianni	7	6
(Israel) Amir Hadad	5	4
(Japan) Yasufumi Yamamoto	5	0
(Slovenia) Iztok Božič	7	6
WC	(Australia) Paul Hanley	7	3	11
28	(Brazil) André Sá	5	6	9

Second round
5	(Netherlands) Dennis van Scheppingen	4	6	8
(Australia) Joseph Sirianni	6	3	6
(Slovenia) Iztok Božič	6	6
WC	(Australia) Paul Hanley	4	1

Qualifying competition
5	(Netherlands) Dennis van Scheppingen	6	6^{1}	6
(Slovenia) Iztok Božič	2	7^{7}	3

=== Sixth qualifier ===
First round
6	(Spain) Fernando Vicente	7	6
(Denmark) Thomas Larsen	5	1
(Canada) Sébastien Lareau	6	6
(Romania) Răzvan Sabău	2	2
(Australia) Toby Mitchell	6	6
(United States) Adam Peterson	4	1
(South Africa) David Nainkin	6	6
27	(United Kingdom) Chris Wilkinson	2	2

Second round
6	(Spain) Fernando Vicente	3	2
(Canada) Sébastien Lareau	6	6
(Australia) Toby Mitchell	1	6	2
(South Africa) David Nainkin	6	2	6

Qualifying competition
(Canada) Sébastien Lareau	2	6	6
(South Africa) David Nainkin	6	2	2

=== Seventh qualifier ===
First round
7	(United States) Steve Campbell	6	6
(Argentina) Carlos Gómez-Díaz	2	4
(Australia) Steven Randjelovic	1	6^{5}
(United States) Jim Thomas	6	7^{7}
(Australia) Grant Doyle	6^{3}	2
WC	(Australia) Joshua Eagle	7^{7}	6
(Netherlands) Fernon Wibier	6	6
26	(France) Gérard Solvès	4	4

Second round
7	(United States) Steve Campbell	6	6^{8}	2
(United States) Jim Thomas	4	7^{10}	1^{r}
WC	(Australia) Joshua Eagle	7	6
(Netherlands) Fernon Wibier	5	3

Qualifying competition
7	(United States) Steve Campbell	6^{2}	6	6
WC	(Australia) Joshua Eagle	7^{7}	3	2

=== Eighth qualifier ===
First round
8	(Spain) Álex López Morón	6	6
(Thailand) Paradorn Srichaphan	4	2
(United Kingdom) Barry Cowan	7^{7}	3	4
(Germany) Carsten Arriens	6^{2}	6	6
(United Kingdom) Miles Maclagan	6	7^{8}
(Italy) Laurence Tieleman	2	6^{6}
(Sweden) Jan Apell	6	3	6
25	(Sweden) Nicklas Kulti	3	6	3

Second round
8	(Spain) Álex López Morón	6	5	8
(Germany) Carsten Arriens	3	7	6
(United Kingdom) Miles Maclagan	4	0
(Sweden) Jan Apell	6	6

Qualifying competition
8	(Spain) Álex López Morón	4	2
(Sweden) Jan Apell	6	6

=== Ninth qualifier ===
First round
9	(Netherlands) John van Lottum	6^{8}	7^{7}	3
(United States) David Caldwell	7^{10}	6^{5}	6
(Belgium) Denis van Uffelen	7^{8}	2	5
(France) Jean-Philippe Fleurian	6^{6}	6	7
(United States) Chris Groer	5	3
(Australia) Andrew Ilie	7	6
(Japan) Tetsuya Chaen	4	0
23	(United States) Michael Sell	6	6

Second round
(United States) David Caldwell	0	6	6
(France) Jean-Philippe Fleurian	6	1	0
(Australia) Andrew Ilie	7^{7}	6
23	(United States) Michael Sell	6^{4}	3

Qualifying competition
(United States) David Caldwell	6^{5}	6	5
(Australia) Andrew Ilie	7^{7}	1	7

=== Tenth qualifier ===
First round
10	(Argentina) Gastón Etlis	1	6	4
(United States) Brian MacPhie	6	4	6
(Sweden) Lars Jönsson	6	3	7
(The Bahamas) Mark Knowles	4	6	5
WC	(Australia) Jordan Kerr	3	7	10
(Australia) Michael Hill	6	5	8
(United States) Bill Behrens	6	6
24	(Romania) Ionuț Moldovan	3	3

Second round
(United States) Brian MacPhie	7	3	6
(Sweden) Lars Jönsson	5	6	2
WC	(Australia) Jordan Kerr	6	6
(United States) Bill Behrens	2	1

Qualifying competition
(United States) Brian MacPhie	4	6	8
WC	(Australia) Jordan Kerr	6	4	6

=== Eleventh qualifier ===
First round
11	(Italy) Marzio Martelli	6	3	6
(Belgium) Tom Vanhoudt	3	6	2
(United States) Wynn Criswell	5	3
(India) Mahesh Bhupathi	7	6
(Israel) Lior Mor	6	7^{7}
(Slovakia) Tomáš Čatár	3	6^{4}
(United States) Alex Reichel	6	7^{7}
21	(Italy) Marco Meneschincheri	1	6^{5}

Second round
11	(Italy) Marzio Martelli	6	6
(India) Mahesh Bhupathi	3	3
(Israel) Lior Mor	3	6	3
(United States) Alex Reichel	6	1	6

Qualifying competition
11	(Italy) Marzio Martelli	6	6
(United States) Alex Reichel	4	4

=== Twelfth qualifier ===
First round
12	(Belgium) Christophe Van Garsse	7^{7}	6
(Ecuador) Luis Morejón	6^{3}	4
(Brazil) Márcio Carlsson	4	6	6
(Australia) Paul Kilderry	6	4	1
(New Zealand) Teo Susnjak	2	3
(Australia) Ben Ellwood	6	6
(South Korea) Yoon Yong-il	2	7^{7}	6
22	(Germany) Dirk Dier	6	6^{2}	3

Second round
12	(Belgium) Christophe Van Garsse	7^{7}	1	6
(Brazil) Márcio Carlsson	6^{5}	6	4
(Australia) Ben Ellwood	6	6
(South Korea) Yoon Yong-il	2	4

Qualifying competition
12	(Belgium) Christophe Van Garsse	6	6
(Australia) Ben Ellwood	3	4

=== Thirteenth qualifier ===
First round
13	(France) Olivier Delaître	6	6
(South Africa) Justin Bower	4	2
(France) Frédéric Fontang	6	6
(New Zealand) Alistair Hunt	2	1
(Spain) David Sánchez	7	6
(Australia) James Sekulov	5	2
(Germany) Karsten Braasch	6	6
Alt	(Germany) Marcus Hilpert	0	3

Second round
13	(France) Olivier Delaître	6	5	6
(France) Frédéric Fontang	3	7	1
(Spain) David Sánchez	4	6^{3}
(Germany) Karsten Braasch	6	7^{7}

Qualifying competition
13	(France) Olivier Delaître	4	4
(Germany) Karsten Braasch	6	6

=== Fourteenth qualifier ===
First round
14	(Italy) Cristiano Caratti	3	4
(Sweden) Fredrik Jonsson	6	6
WC	(Australia) Tate Roberts	2	0
(Israel) Nir Welgreen	6	6
(Germany) Michael Kohlmann	6^{5}	5
(Egypt) Tamer El-Sawy	7^{7}	7
(Germany) Tomas Behrend	4	4
19	(United States) David Wheaton	6	6

Second round
(Sweden) Fredrik Jonsson	6	6
(Israel) Nir Welgreen	3	3
(Egypt) Tamer El-Sawy	5	4
19	(United States) David Wheaton	7	6

Qualifying competition
(Sweden) Fredrik Jonsson	4	2
19	(United States) David Wheaton	6	6

=== Fifteenth qualifier ===
First round
15	(Germany) Lars Burgsmüller	6	6
WC	(Australia) Grant Silcock	4	4
(Belarus) Max Mirnyi	5	4
(Germany) Markus Hantschk	7	6
(Austria) Wolfgang Schranz	6	1	6
(South Africa) Kevin Ullyett	3	6	2
WC	(Australia) Dejan Petrović	7^{7}	6
18	(Spain) Óscar Burrieza	6^{4}	4

Second round
15	(Germany) Lars Burgsmüller	2	7^{7}	6
(Germany) Markus Hantschk	6	6^{5}	4
(Austria) Wolfgang Schranz	3	4
WC	(Australia) Dejan Petrović	6	6

Qualifying competition
15	(Germany) Lars Burgsmüller	6	6
WC	(Australia) Dejan Petrović	3	1

=== Sixteenth qualifier ===
First round
16	(France) Sébastien Grosjean	6	6
(United States) Oren Motevassel	0	2
(United States) David Witt	6	6
(Israel) Eyal Ran	1	4
(Russia) Andrei Stoliarov	6	3	6
WC	(Australia) Sebastien Swierk	4	6	3
WC	(Australia) Nathan Healey	5	4
17	(United Kingdom) Andrew Richardson	7	6

Second round
16	(France) Sébastien Grosjean	5	6	3
(United States) David Witt	7	2	6
(Russia) Andrei Stoliarov	1	7	7
17	(United Kingdom) Andrew Richardson	6	5	9

Qualifying competition
(United States) David Witt	6	5	6
17	(United Kingdom) Andrew Richardson	3	7	4
