= 1999 Wimbledon Championships – Men's doubles qualifying =

Men's doubles qualifying
- 1999 Wimbledon Championships

Events
| Singles | men | women | | boys | girls |
| Doubles | men | women | mixed | boys | girls |
| WC Singles | men | women | quad |
| WC Doubles | men | women | quad |
| Legends | men | women | seniors |

Qualification
| Singles | men | women |
| Doubles | men | women |
- Wimbledon Championships

Players and pairs who neither have high enough rankings nor receive wild cards may participate in a qualifying tournament held one week before the annual Wimbledon Tennis Championships.

== Seeds ==
1. (South Africa) Jeff Coetzee / (Finland) Tuomas Ketola (second round)
2. (Venezuela) Maurice Ruah / (Brazil) André Sá (first round)
3. (United States) Adam Peterson / (United States) Chris Tontz (second round)
4. (Japan) Thomas Shimada / (South Africa) Myles Wakefield (second round)
5. (Brazil) Adriano Ferreira / (Japan) Gouichi Motomura (qualified)
6. (Australia) Ben Ellwood / (Australia) Dejan Petrović (second round)

== Qualifiers ==
1. (Brazil) Adriano Ferreira / (Japan) Gouichi Motomura
2. (Canada) Bobby Kokavec / (Romania) Gabriel Trifu
3. (Italy) Mosé Navarra / (Italy) Stefano Pescosolido

== Lucky losers ==
1. (Israel) Amir Hadad / (South Africa) Damien Roberts

== Qualifying draw ==
=== First qualifier ===
First round
1 | (South Africa) Jeff Coetzee (Finland) Tuomas Ketola | 3 | 7 | 8
(Japan) Satoshi Iwabuchi (Japan) Mitsuru Takada | 6 | 6 | 6
(United Kingdom) Kyle Spencer (Israel) Nir Welgreen | 7 | 4 | 4
(Italy) Diego Nargiso (United States) Greg Van Emburgh | 6 | 6 | 6
(Georgia (country)) Irakli Labadze (Italy) Federico Luzzi | 3^{r}
WC | (Israel) Ronen Morali (Israel) Andy Ram | 4
(Australia) Grant Doyle (Australia) Mark Draper | 2 | 4
5 | (Brazil) Adriano Ferreira (Japan) Gouichi Motomura | 6 | 6

Second round
1 | (South Africa) Jeff Coetzee (Finland) Tuomas Ketola | 5 | 4
(Italy) Diego Nargiso (United States) Greg Van Emburgh | 7 | 6
WC | (Israel) Ronen Morali (Israel) Andy Ram | 3 | 2
5 | (Brazil) Adriano Ferreira (Japan) Gouichi Motomura | 6 | 6

Qualifying competition
(Italy) Diego Nargiso (United States) Greg Van Emburgh | 6^{2} | 3 | 6 | 2
5 | (Brazil) Adriano Ferreira (Japan) Gouichi Motomura | 7^{7} | 6 | 4 | 6

=== Second qualifier ===
First round
2 | (Venezuela) Maurice Ruah (Brazil) André Sá | 3 | 6 | 4
(United Kingdom) James Davidson (United Kingdom) Jamie Delgado | 6 | 4 | 6
(United States) Chris Groer (Australia) Steven Randjelovic | 4 | 6 | 6
(Australia) Matthew Breen (Australia) Joseph Sirianni | 6 | 4 | 4
(Canada) Bobby Kokavec (Romania) Gabriel Trifu | 7 | 4 | 6
(Switzerland) Yves Allegro (Canada) Frédéric Niemeyer | 5 | 6 | 4
(Sweden) Matthias Hellström (Sweden) Jan Hermansson | 3 | 4
6 | (Australia) Ben Ellwood (Australia) Dejan Petrović | 6 | 6

Second round
(United Kingdom) James Davidson (United Kingdom) Jamie Delgado | 2 | 6 | 10
(United States) Chris Groer (Australia) Steven Randjelovic | 6 | 1 | 8
(Canada) Bobby Kokavec (Romania) Gabriel Trifu | 7 | 6
6 | (Australia) Ben Ellwood (Australia) Dejan Petrović | 6 | 4

Qualifying competition
(United Kingdom) James Davidson (United Kingdom) Jamie Delgado | 4 | 3 | 6 | 6 | 4
(Canada) Bobby Kokavec (Romania) Gabriel Trifu | 6 | 6 | 3 | 4 | 6

=== Third qualifier ===
First round
3 | (United States) Adam Peterson (United States) Chris Tontz | 6 | 6
(Puerto Rico) José Frontera (Israel) Ofer Sela | 3 | 1
WC | (United Kingdom) Nick Gould (United Kingdom) Justin Layne | 4 | 4
(Israel) Amir Hadad (South Africa) Damien Roberts | 6 | 6
(Italy) Mosé Navarra (Italy) Stefano Pescosolido | 6 | 3 | 6
(Israel) Eyal Erlich (Israel) Jonathan Erlich | 4 | 6 | 1
(Argentina) Enzo Artoni (United States) Jim Thomas | 5 | 6
4 | (Japan) Thomas Shimada (South Africa) Myles Wakefield | 7 | 7

Second round
3 | (United States) Adam Peterson (United States) Chris Tontz | 6 | 5
(Israel) Amir Hadad (South Africa) Damien Roberts | 7 | 7
(Italy) Mosé Navarra (Italy) Stefano Pescosolido | 3 | 6 | 7
4 | (Japan) Thomas Shimada (South Africa) Myles Wakefield | 6 | 3 | 5

Qualifying competition
(Israel) Amir Hadad (South Africa) Damien Roberts | 6 | 7^{9} | 6^{7} | 3 | 2
(Italy) Mosé Navarra (Italy) Stefano Pescosolido | 4 | 6^{7} | 7^{9} | 6 | 6
