= 1999 Wimbledon Championships – Men's singles qualifying =

Men's singles qualifying
- 1999 Wimbledon Championships

Events
| Singles | men | women | | boys | girls |
| Doubles | men | women | mixed | boys | girls |
| WC Singles | men | women | quad |
| WC Doubles | men | women | quad |
| Legends | men | women | seniors |

Qualification
| Singles | men | women |
| Doubles | men | women |
- Wimbledon Championships

Players and pairs who neither have high enough rankings nor receive wild cards may participate in a qualifying tournament held one week before the annual Wimbledon Tennis Championships.

== Seeds ==
1. (Czech Republic) Petr Korda (second round)
2. (Germany) Michael Kohlmann (qualifying competition, lucky loser)
3. (Italy) Mosé Navarra (first round)
4. (Germany) Axel Pretzsch (second round)
5. (United States) Geoff Grant (first round)
6. (Belarus) Max Mirnyi (qualifying competition)
7. (Sweden) Mikael Tillström (qualifier)
8. (Germany) Christian Vinck (qualifier)
9. (Czech Republic) Radek Štěpánek (second round, withdrew)
10. (Argentina) Sebastián Prieto (first round)
11. (Italy) Diego Nargiso (second round)
12. (France) Stéphane Huet (first round)
13. (Mexico) Alejandro Hernández (qualifier)
14. (Finland) Tuomas Ketola (second round)
15. (United States) Alex O'Brien (qualifying competition)
16. (Switzerland) Ivo Heuberger (first round)
17. (Brazil) André Sá (qualifier)
18. (Venezuela) Maurice Ruah (second round)
19. (Australia) Mark Draper (qualifying competition)
20. (South Africa) Neville Godwin (first round)
21. (Italy) Cristiano Caratti (qualifier)
22. (Australia) Wayne Arthurs (qualifier)
23. (Australia) Michael Tebbutt (first round)
24. (United States) Brian MacPhie (first round)
25. (United States) Bob Bryan (second round)
26. (Australia) Michael Hill (qualifying competition)
27. (Switzerland) Lorenzo Manta (qualifier)
28. (Spain) Stefano Pescosolido (second round)
29. (France) Rodolphe Gilbert (first round)
30. (Israel) Eyal Ran (first round)
31. (Japan) Gouichi Motomura (first round)
32. (United States) Michael Joyce (qualifying competition)

== Qualifiers ==
1. (United Kingdom) Danny Sapsford
2. (Thailand) Paradorn Srichaphan
3. (Portugal) Nuno Marques
4. (United Kingdom) Jamie Delgado
5. (Switzerland) Lorenzo Manta
6. (United Kingdom) Arvind Parmar
7. (Sweden) Mikael Tillström
8. (Germany) Christian Vinck
9. (Federal Republic of Yugoslavia) Nenad Zimonjić
10. (United States) Richey Reneberg
11. (Italy) Cristiano Caratti
12. (Australia) Wayne Arthurs
13. (Mexico) Alejandro Hernández
14. (South Africa) Grant Stafford
15. (Brazil) André Sá
16. (Australia) Sandon Stolle

== Lucky loser ==
1. (Germany) Michael Kohlmann

== Qualifying draw ==
=== First qualifier ===
First round
1 | (Czech Republic) Petr Korda | 7 | 6
(Spain) Óscar Burrieza | 5 | 2
(Brazil) Ricardo Schlachter | 4 | 7 | 1
WC | (United Kingdom) Danny Sapsford | 6 | 6 | 6
(Brazil) Adriano Ferreira | 6 | 3 | 2
(France) Cyril Saulnier | 4 | 6 | 6
(France) Gérard Solvès | 6 | 5 | 2
32 | (United States) Michael Joyce | 4 | 7 | 6

Second round
1 | (Czech Republic) Petr Korda | 6 | 6 | 4
WC | (United Kingdom) Danny Sapsford | 3 | 7 | 6
(France) Cyril Saulnier | 4 | 4
32 | (United States) Michael Joyce | 6 | 6

Qualifying competition
WC | (United Kingdom) Danny Sapsford | 6 | 3 | 4 | 6 | 8
32 | (United States) Michael Joyce | 4 | 6 | 6 | 4 | 6

=== Second qualifier ===
First round
2 | (Germany) Michael Kohlmann | 6 | 6
(United States) Chris Groer | 2 | 4
(United States) Michael Sell | 6 | 6
(Spain) Iván Rodrigo Marín | 1 | 3
(United States) David DiLucia | 6 | 6
(Israel) Nir Welgreen | 0 | 3
(Thailand) Paradorn Srichaphan | 1 | 6 | 6
31 | (Japan) Gouichi Motomura | 6 | 1 | 2

Second round
2 | (Germany) Michael Kohlmann | 2 | 6 | 6
(United States) Michael Sell | 6 | 3 | 4
(United States) David DiLucia | 5 | 1
(Thailand) Paradorn Srichaphan | 7 | 6

Qualifying competition
2 | (Germany) Michael Kohlmann | 6 | 6^{2} | 2 | 3
(Thailand) Paradorn Srichaphan | 1 | 7^{7} | 6 | 6

=== Third qualifier ===
First round
3 | (Italy) Mosé Navarra | 4 | 6 | 11
WC | (United Kingdom) Simon Dickson | 6 | 4 | 13
(Canada) Bobby Kokavec | 6 | 3
(United States) Mark Merklein | 7 | 6
(Portugal) Nuno Marques | 6 | 6
(United States) Scott Humphries | 4 | 4
(United States) Jared Palmer | 2 | 6 | 7
30 | (Israel) Eyal Ran | 6 | 1 | 5

Second round
WC | (United Kingdom) Simon Dickson | 2 | 7 | 3
(United States) Mark Merklein | 6 | 5 | 6
(Portugal) Nuno Marques | 4 | 6 | 10
(United States) Jared Palmer | 6 | 3 | 8

Qualifying competition
(United States) Mark Merklein | 6^{4} | 6 | 3 | 4
(Portugal) Nuno Marques | 7^{7} | 1 | 6 | 6

=== Fourth qualifier ===
First round
4 | (Germany) Axel Pretzsch | 6 | 6
(Australia) Todd Larkham | 3 | 3
(United Kingdom) Jamie Delgado | 6 | 6 | 6
(Australia) Toby Mitchell | 7 | 2 | 2
WC | (United Kingdom) Rhys Hanger | 2 | 0
(Germany) Franz Stauder | 6 | 6
(The Bahamas) Mark Knowles | 4 | 7 | 6
29 | (France) Rodolphe Gilbert | 6 | 6 | 4

Second round
4 | (Germany) Axel Pretzsch | 6 | 6 | 3
(United Kingdom) Jamie Delgado | 7 | 1 | 6
(Germany) Franz Stauder | 6 | 6 | 6
(The Bahamas) Mark Knowles | 7 | 4 | 2

Qualifying competition
(United Kingdom) Jamie Delgado | 3 | 6^{4} | 6 | 6 | 7
(Germany) Franz Stauder | 6 | 7^{7} | 3 | 3 | 5

=== Fifth qualifier ===
First round
5 | (United States) Geoff Grant | 7 | 4 | 8
(Romania) Gabriel Trifu | 6 | 6 | 10
(Australia) Joseph Sirianni | 2 | 3
(Japan) Satoshi Iwabuchi | 6 | 6
(United States) Hugo Armando | 5 | 3
(United States) David Wheaton | 7 | 6
(Italy) Igor Gaudi | 5 | 6 | 4
27 | (Switzerland) Lorenzo Manta | 7 | 2 | 6

Second round
(Romania) Gabriel Trifu | 4 | 6 | 11
(Japan) Satoshi Iwabuchi | 6 | 1 | 9
(United States) David Wheaton | 5 | 6
27 | (Switzerland) Lorenzo Manta | 7 | 7

Qualifying competition
(Romania) Gabriel Trifu | 3 | 5 | 6^{6}
27 | (Switzerland) Lorenzo Manta | 6 | 7 | 7^{8}

=== Sixth qualifier ===
First round
6 | (Belarus) Max Mirnyi | 6 | 7
(New Zealand) Alistair Hunt | 3 | 6
(Canada) Frédéric Niemeyer | 6 | 6
(Czech Republic) Radovan Světlík | 2 | 1
(United States) Mashiska Washington | 1 | 4
(United Kingdom) Arvind Parmar | 6 | 6
(Italy) Daniele Bracciali | 7 | 2 | 0^{r}
28 | (Italy) Stefano Pescosolido | 6 | 6 | 1

Second round
6 | (Belarus) Max Mirnyi | 6 | 6 | 6
(Japan) Satoshi Iwabuchi | 7 | 4 | 4
(United Kingdom) Arvind Parmar | 4 | 7 | 6
28 | (Italy) Stefano Pescosolido | 6 | 6 | 3

Qualifying competition
6 | (Belarus) Max Mirnyi | 6^{3} | 6 | 3 | 4
(United Kingdom) Arvind Parmar | 7^{7} | 4 | 6 | 6

=== Seventh qualifier ===
First round
7 | (Sweden) Mikael Tillström | 6 | 6
(Australia) Grant Doyle | 1 | 3
(Japan) Yaoki Ishii | 1 | 6 | 6
(Argentina) Marcelo Charpentier | 6 | 1 | 4
(Israel) Amir Hadad | 6 | 6
(Italy) Daniele Musa | 7 | 7
(Greece) Anastasios Vasiliadis | 2 | 3
26 | (Australia) Michael Hill | 6 | 6

Second round
7 | (Sweden) Mikael Tillström | 6 | 6
(Japan) Yaoki Ishii | 2 | 3
(Italy) Daniele Musa | 1 | 1
26 | (Australia) Michael Hill | 6 | 6

Qualifying competition
7 | (Sweden) Mikael Tillström | 6 | 6 | 3 | 6
26 | (Australia) Michael Hill | 4 | 4 | 6 | 4

=== Eighth qualifier ===
First round
8 | (Germany) Christian Vinck | 6 | 6
(United States) Rob Givone | 3 | 2
(Belgium) Gilles Elseneer | 6 | 6 | 6
(Russia) Igor Kornienko | 7 | 2 | 4
(Australia) James Sekulov | 7 | 6
(Czech Republic) Martin Štěpánek | 6 | 3
(Georgia (country)) Irakli Labadze | 5 | 1
25 | (United States) Bob Bryan | 7 | 6

Second round
8 | (Germany) Christian Vinck | 6 | 6
(Belgium) Gilles Elseneer | 3 | 4
(Australia) James Sekulov | 6 | 6
25 | (United States) Bob Bryan | 4 | 4

Qualifying competition
8 | (Germany) Christian Vinck | 6 | 6 | 6
(Australia) James Sekulov | 3 | 4 | 3

=== Ninth qualifier ===
First round
9 | (Czech Republic) Radek Štěpánek | 6 | 4 | 6
(Israel) Oren Motevassel | 2 | 6 | 3
(United States) Mike Bryan | 6 | 6
(Argentina) Roberto Álvarez | 4 | 4
(Italy) Mario Visconti | 7 | 1 | 4
(Israel) Jonathan Erlich | 6 | 6 | 6
(Federal Republic of Yugoslavia) Nenad Zimonjić | 6 | 6
24 | (United States) Brian MacPhie | 3 | 2

Second round
9 | (Czech Republic) Radek Štěpánek | w/o
(United States) Mike Bryan
(Israel) Jonathan Erlich | 3 | 4
(Federal Republic of Yugoslavia) Nenad Zimonjić | 6 | 6

Qualifying competition
(United States) Mike Bryan | 4 | 6^{2} | 3
(Federal Republic of Yugoslavia) Nenad Zimonjić | 6 | 7^{7} | 6

=== Tenth qualifier ===
First round
10 | (Argentina) Sebastián Prieto | 2 | 6 | 21
WC | (United States) Jim Thomas | 6 | 4 | 23
(United States) Richey Reneberg | 6 | 7
WC | (United Kingdom) Nick Weal | 3 | 6
(United States) Jonathan Stark | 6 | 7
(France) Thierry Guardiola | 3 | 6
(Australia) Jaymon Crabb | 4 | 6 | 6
23 | (Australia) Michael Tebbutt | 6 | 1 | 3

Second round
(United States) Jim Thomas | 1 | 1
(United States) Richey Reneberg | 6 | 6
(United States) Jonathan Stark | 6 | 6
(Australia) Jaymon Crabb | 3 | 0

Qualifying competition
(United States) Richey Reneberg | 6 | 6 | 6
(United States) Jonathan Stark | 4 | 3 | 4

=== Eleventh qualifier ===
First round
11 | (Italy) Diego Nargiso | 6 | 6
(Sweden) Simon Aspelin | 2 | 1
(Israel) Ofer Sela | 6 | 5
(Australia) Ben Ellwood | 7 | 7
WC | (United States) Alex Reichel | 6 | 1 | 3
(France) Julien Varlet | 3 | 6 | 6
(South Africa) Damien Roberts | 1 | 4
21 | (Italy) Cristiano Caratti | 6 | 6

Second round
(Italy) Diego Nargiso | 4 | 1
(Australia) Ben Ellwood | 6 | 6
(France) Julien Varlet | 3 | 0
21 | (Italy) Cristiano Caratti | 6 | 6

Qualifying competition
(Australia) Ben Ellwood | 2 | 6 | 2 | 6 | 1
(Italy) Cristiano Caratti | 6 | 2 | 6 | 3 | 6

=== Twelfth qualifier ===
First round
12 | (France) Stéphane Huet | 7 | 4 | 1
(Czech Republic) David Miketa | 6 | 6 | 6
(Spain) Victor Sendin | 6 | 1 | 2
(Australia) Matthew Breen | 4 | 6 | 6
(France) Nicolas Thomann | 4 | 6 | 6
(Australia) Steven Randjelovic | 6 | 3 | 3
(Argentina) Enzo Artoni | 6 | 2
22 | (Australia) Wayne Arthurs | 7 | 6

Second round
(Czech Republic) David Miketa | 3 | 6 | 7
(Australia) Matthew Breen | 6 | 3 | 5
(France) Nicolas Thomann | 4 | 6
22 | (Australia) Wayne Arthurs | 6 | 7

Qualifying competition
(Czech Republic) David Miketa | 6^{2} | 6^{3} | 3
22 | (Australia) Wayne Arthurs | 7^{7} | 7^{7} | 6

=== Thirteenth qualifier ===
First round
13 | (Mexico) Alejandro Hernández | 6 | 6
(Sweden) Mattias Hellström | 2 | 4
(Switzerland) Yves Allegro | 5 | 2
(Australia) Dejan Petrović | 7 | 6
(Germany) Mark Joachim | 6 | 2
(Argentina) Andrés Zingman | 7 | 6
(South Africa) Wesley Whitehouse | 6 | 6
22 | (South Africa) Neville Godwin | 3 | 3

Second round
13 | (Mexico) Alejandro Hernández | 6 | 6
(Australia) Dejan Petrović | 4 | 1
(Argentina) Andrés Zingman | 2 | 2
(South Africa) Wesley Whitehouse | 6 | 6

Qualifying competition
13 | (Mexico) Alejandro Hernández | 3 | 6 | 6 | 6
(South Africa) Wesley Whitehouse | 6 | 4 | 4 | 3

=== Fourteenth qualifier ===
First round
14 | (Finland) Tuomas Ketola | 6 | 6
WC | (United Kingdom) David Sherwood | 4 | 0
(Israel) Eyal Erlich | 4 | 2
(South Africa) Grant Stafford | 6 | 6
(France) Charles Auffray | 6 | 2
(United Kingdom) Nick Gould | 7 | 6
(United Kingdom) Justin Layne | 6 | 1 | 4
19 | (Australia) Mark Draper | 4 | 6 | 6

Second round
14 | (Finland) Tuomas Ketola | 2 | 5
(South Africa) Grant Stafford | 6 | 7
(United Kingdom) Nick Gould | 3 | 2
19 | (Australia) Mark Draper | 6 | 6

Qualifying competition
(South Africa) Grant Stafford | 7 | 6^{2} | 6 | 6
19 | (Australia) Mark Draper | 5 | 7^{7} | 1 | 2

=== Fifteenth qualifier ===
First round
15 | (United States) Alex O'Brien | 6 | 6
WC | (United Kingdom) Paul Hand | 2 | 4
WC | (United Kingdom) James Davidson | 6 | 7
(France) Philippe Pasquier | 4 | 5
(Netherlands) Martijn Belgraver | 4 | 6
(Romania) Răzvan Sabău | 6 | 7
(Sweden) Jan Hermansson | 6 | 6 | 4
17 | (Brazil) André Sá | 7 | 4 | 6

Second round
15 | (United States) Alex O'Brien | 7 | 6
(United Kingdom) James Davidson | 5 | 1
(Romania) Răzvan Sabău | 3 | 6 | 3
17 | (Brazil) André Sá | 6 | 2 | 6

Qualifying competition
15 | (United States) Alex O'Brien | 5 | 7^{7} | 3 | 3
17 | (Brazil) André Sá | 7 | 6^{5} | 6 | 6

=== Sixteenth qualifier ===
First round
16 | (Switzerland) Ivo Heuberger | 2 | 2
(India) Mahesh Bhupathi | 6 | 6
(South Africa) Jeff Coetzee | 6 | 6
(France) Jean-Michel Pequery | 3 | 1
(Spain) Sergi Durán | 6 | 4 | 1
(Australia) Sandon Stolle | 4 | 6 | 6
(Australia) Peter Tramacchi | 6 | 6
18 | (Venezuela) Maurice Ruah | 7 | 7

Second round
(India) Mahesh Bhupathi | 4 | 4
(South Africa) Jeff Coetzee | 6 | 6
(Australia) Sandon Stolle | 6 | 6
18 | (Venezuela) Maurice Ruah | 2 | 3

Qualifying competition
(South Africa) Jeff Coetzee | 4 | 1 | 6^{1}
(Australia) Sandon Stolle | 6 | 6 | 7^{7}
