= Miles Maclagan =

Zambian-born British tennis player and coach

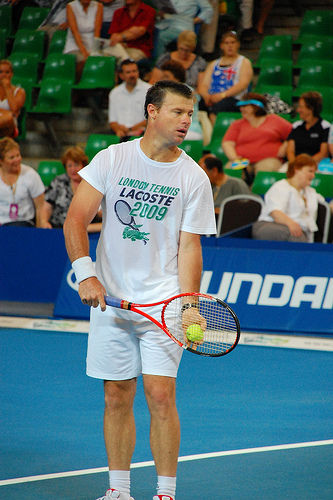
- Country (sports): (United Kingdom) Zambia but only represented Great Britain
- Residence: Wimbledon, England
- Born: 23 September 1974 (age 51) Kafue, Zambia
- Height: 5 ft 11 in (180 cm)
- Turned pro: 1993
- Retired: 2003
- Plays: Right-handed (one-handed backhand)
- Prize money: $247,737

Singles
- Career record: 3–11 (at ATP Tour level, Grand Slam level, and in Davis Cup)
- Career titles: 0; 1 Challenger, 2 Futures
- Highest ranking: No. 172 (14 Aug 1995)

Grand Slam singles results
- Australian Open: Q2 (1998)
- French Open: Q1 (1994, 1995)
- Wimbledon: 2R (1993, 1995)
- US Open: Q2 (1997)

Doubles
- Career record: 6–14 (at ATP Tour level, Grand Slam level, and in Davis Cup)
- Career titles: 0; 1 Challenger, 6 Futures
- Highest ranking: No. 200 (3 Oct 1994)

Grand Slam doubles results
- Wimbledon: 2R (2003)

Coaching career (2005–present)
- Wayne Black and Kevin Ullyett; Paul Hanley and Kevin Ullyett 2006–2007; Great Britain Davis Cup team (2006); Andy Murray 2007–2010; Philipp Kohlschreiber 2010–2011; Marcos Baghdatis 2010–2011; Laura Robson 2013; Sam Stosur 2013–2014; Borna Ćorić 2015–present

Coaching achievements
- Coachee singles titles total: 13
- Coachee doubles titles total: 2
- List of notable tournaments (with champion) (Zimbabwe) 2005 Australian Open and 2005 Rogers Cup champion (Black and Ullyett doubles) (United Kingdom) Andy Murray career statistics (from 2007 to July 2010)
- Last updated on: 16 May 2026.

Miles Maclagan (born 23 September 1974) is a Zambia born British tennis coach and former professional tennis player. He formerly coached British No.1s Laura Robson and Andy Murray.

Maclagan partnered Tim Henman successfully in the Davis Cup against Thailand, a match he called the moment of his life, and helping Great Britain into the World Group.

== Early life ==
He was born in Zambia to Scottish parents but moved to Harare, Zimbabwe when he was six years old. Maclagan primarily grew up in Harare. He regularly competed against Wayne Black.

== Tennis career ==
He left Zimbabwe in 1988 to pursue tennis in the United Kingdom. He reached a highest ranking of 172 in singles and 200 in doubles. He played in three Davis Cup ties for Great Britain, making his debut against Slovakia in 1995 and coming out of retirement to partner Tim Henman to victory against Thailand at the Birmingham NIA in 2002. At Wimbledon in 1999, Maclagan managed to take a two set to love lead against Boris Becker, and had three match points on Becker's serve in the fourth set, before eventually losing in five sets.

His last match was at Wimbledon 2003 where he lost to Alex Kim in the first round.

== Coaching ==
As a coach he worked with doubles specialists such as Wayne Black and Kevin Ulyett and was part of their team as they went on to win the Australian Open Doubles title in 2005. He subsequently continued to coach the pairing of Kevin Ullyett and Paul Hanley after Wayne Black retired. At the end of 2007 he was invited to join up with fellow Scot and British No. 1 Andy Murray as part of his coaching team.

On 27 July 2010, Andy Murray and Maclagan split. But he was not out of employment for long as on 17 September he was hired by German player Philipp Kohlschreiber. Between June 2011 to July 2012, he coached former World No.8 Cypriot Marcos Baghdatis.

In June 2013, it was announced that Maclagan would start coaching Laura Robson. However this partnership ended in October 2013 and Sam Stosur chose Maclagan to replace David Taylor as her coach. Stosur ended her coaching relationship with Maclagan in June 2014, ten days before the 2014 Wimbledon. Maclagan began coaching Borna Ćorić in December 2015.

== ATP Challenger and ITF Futures finals ==
=== Singles: 5 (3–2) ===
Legend ATP Challenger (1–0) ITF Futures (2–2)	Finals by surface Hard (1–1) Clay (2–1) Grass (0–0) Carpet (0–0)

Result	W–L	Date	Tournament	Tier	Surface	Opponent	Score
Win	1–0	Aug 1995	Istanbul, Turkey	Challenger	Hard	(France) Frederic Vitoux	7–6, 5–7, 6–2
Loss	1–1	Feb 1998	Ghana F2, Accra	Futures	Clay	(Australia) Steven Randjelovic	4–6, 4–6
Loss	1–2	Aug 2000	Great Britain F6, Bath	Futures	Hard	(France) Julien Couly	4–5, 4–2, 5–4, 4–5, 1–4
Win	2–2	Jul 2002	Romania F3, Brasov	Futures	Clay	(Romania) Gabriel Moraru	7–6^{(7–0)}, 6–3
Win	3–2	Aug 2002	Egypt F2, Giza	Futures	Clay	(France) Julien Jeanpierre	6–2, 6–4

=== Doubles: 14 (7–7) ===
Legend ATP Challenger (1–2) ITF Futures (6–5)	Finals by surface Hard (3–4) Clay (4–3) Grass (0–0) Carpet (0–0)

Result	W–L	Date	Tournament	Tier	Surface	Partner	Opponents	Score
Loss	0–1	Aug 1993	Istanbul, Turkey	Challenger	Hard	(Romania) Dinu-Mihai Pescariu	(France) Jean-Philippe Fleurian (The Bahamas) Roger Smith	6–7, 3–6
Win	1–1	Jul 1997	Brasov, Romania	Challenger	Clay	(Romania) Gheorghe Cosac	(Romania) Ionut Moldovan (Romania) Dinu-Mihai Pescariu	6–4, 7–6
Loss	1–2	Feb 1998	Ghana F1, Accra	Futures	Clay	(France) Nicolas Kischkewitz	(Italy) Fabio Beraldo (Italy) Gabrio Castrichella	walkover
Loss	1–3	Dec 1998	USA F11, Clearwater	Futures	Hard	(France) Thierry Guardiola	(United States) Chris Groer (United States) Mitch Sprengelmeyer	7–6, 4–6, 5–7
Win	2–3	May 1999	Great Britain F6, Newcastle	Futures	Clay	(Australia) Ben Ellwood	(South Africa) Damien Roberts (South Africa) Myles Wakefield	6–2, 6–4
Win	3–3	May 1999	Great Britain F7, Edinburgh	Futures	Clay	(Australia) Ben Ellwood	(United Kingdom) Martin Lee (United Kingdom) Arvind Parmar	6–2, 6–3
Loss	3–4	Nov 1999	USA F19, Grenelefe	Futures	Hard	(France) Cedric Kauffmann	(Canada) Bobby Kokavec (Canada) Jocelyn Robichaud	6–4, 5–7, 1–6
Loss	3–5	Jan 2000	India F2, Bangalore	Futures	Clay	(Pakistan) Aisam Ul Haq Qureshi	(Israel) Andy Ram (Israel) Nir Welgreen	6–2, 3–6, 4–6
Loss	3–6	Aug 2000	Wrexham, Great Britain	Challenger	Hard	(United Kingdom) Andrew Richardson	(Italy) Daniele Bracciali (Pakistan) Aisam Ul Haq Qureshi	4–6, 2–6
Win	4–6	Aug 2000	Great Britain F6, Bath	Futures	Hard	(Israel) Amir Hadad	(South Africa) Vaughan Snyman (South Africa) Haydn Wakefield	5–4, 5–4, 5–3
Win	5–6	Oct 2002	Jamaica F16, Montego Bay	Futures	Hard	(France) Cedric Kauffmann	(Puerto Rico) Gabriel Montilla (United States) Kyle Porter	6–3, 6–3
Win	6–6	Oct 2002	Jamaica F17, Negril	Futures	Hard	(France) Cedric Kauffmann	(Serbia) Darko Madjarovski (Slovakia) Michal Mertinak	6–3, 6–7^{(4–7)}, 7–6^{(7–2)}
Loss	6–7	Nov 2002	Jamaica F18, Negril	Futures	Clay	(France) Cedric Kauffmann	(Brazil) Eduardo Bohrer (Venezuela) Kepler Orellana	4–6, 6–0, 3–6
Win	7–7	Mar 2003	Spain F4, Cartagena	Futures	Clay	(France) Stephane Robert	(Spain) Salvador Navarro-Gutierrez (Spain) Gabriel Trujillo-Soler	7–6^{(7–3)}, 7–6^{(7–4)}
