= 1999 Wimbledon Championships – Women's doubles qualifying =

Women's doubles qualifying
- 1999 Wimbledon Championships

Events
Singles	men	women		boys	girls
Doubles	men	women	mixed	boys	girls
WC Singles	men	women	quad
WC Doubles	men	women	quad
Legends	men	women	seniors

Qualification
Singles	men	women
Doubles	men	women
- Wimbledon Championships

Players and pairs who neither have high enough rankings nor receive wild cards may participate in a qualifying tournament held one week before the annual Wimbledon Tennis Championships.

== Seeds ==
1. (Germany) Jana Kandarr / (Australia) Trudi Musgrave (first round)
2. (United States) Samantha Reeves / (United States) Mashona Washington (qualifying competition, lucky losers)
3. (Australia) Jelena Dokic / (Slovenia) Tina Pisnik (qualified)
4. (Austria) Barbara Schwartz / (Austria) Patricia Wartusch (first round)

== Qualifiers ==
1. (Germany) Julia Abe / (Russia) Nadia Petrova
2. (Australia) Jelena Dokić / (Slovenia) Tina Pisnik

== Lucky losers ==
1. (Russia) Alina Jidkova / (Paraguay) Larissa Schaerer
2. (United States) Samantha Reeves / (United States) Mashona Washington

== Qualifying draw ==
=== First qualifier ===
First round
1	(Germany) Jana Kandarr (Australia) Trudi Musgrave	2	6	5
(Croatia) Jelena Kostanić (Belgium) Patty Van Acker	6	2	7
(Germany) Julia Abe (Russia) Nadia Petrova
(Australia) Evie Dominikovic (Tunisia) Selima Sfar	w/o
4	(Austria) Barbara Schwartz (Austria) Patricia Wartusch	6	4	3
(Russia) Alina Jidkova (Paraguay) Larissa Schaerer	3	6	6
(Italy) Tathiana Garbin (Germany) Caroline Schneider	2	6
(Belgium) Kim Clijsters (Italy) Antonella Serra Zanetti	6	7

Second round
(Croatia) Jelena Kostanić (Belgium) Patty Van Acker	4	4
(Germany) Julia Abe (Russia) Nadia Petrova	6	6
(Russia) Alina Jidkova (Paraguay) Larissa Schaerer	6	6
(Belgium) Kim Clijsters (Italy) Antonella Serra Zanetti	2	1

Qualifying competition
(Germany) Julia Abe (Russia) Nadia Petrova	6	6
(Russia) Alina Jidkova (Paraguay) Larissa Schaerer	2	3

=== Second qualifier ===
First round
(Germany) Anca Barna (United States) Karin Miller	6	0	6
(Japan) Shinobu Asagoe (South Korea) Park Sung-hee	1	6	4
(Hungary) Nóra Köves (India) Nirupama Vaidyanathan	3	4
3	(Australia) Jelena Dokic (Slovenia) Tina Pisnik	6	6
WC	(United Kingdom) Lizzie Jelfs (United Kingdom) Kate Warne-Holland	3	2
(Italy) Francesca Lubiani (Switzerland) Miroslava Vavrinec	6	6
(Federal Republic of Yugoslavia) Sandra Načuk (United States) Brie Rippner	4	6
2	(United States) Samantha Reeves (United States) Mashona Washington	6	7

Second round
(Germany) Anca Barna (United States) Karin Miller	6	3
3	(Australia) Jelena Dokic (Slovenia) Tina Pisnik	7	6
(Italy) Francesca Lubiani (Switzerland) Miroslava Vavrinec	1	4
2	(United States) Samantha Reeves (United States) Mashona Washington	6	6

Qualifying competition
3	(Australia) Jelena Dokic (Slovenia) Tina Pisnik	6	7
2	(United States) Samantha Reeves (United States) Mashona Washington	1	5
