= Chris Tontz =

American tennis player and coach

- Country (sports): United States
- Born: October 27, 1973 (age 51); Baltimore, Maryland, United States
- Plays: Right-handed
- Prize money: $13,506

Singles
- Career record: 0–0
- Career titles: 0; 0 Challenger, 0 Futures
- Highest ranking: No. 637 (10 November 1997)

Doubles
- Career record: 0–2 (ATP Tour)
- Career titles: 0; 1 Challenger, 3 Futures
- Highest ranking: No. 162 (7 June 1999)

Grand Slam doubles results
- Wimbledon: Q2 (1999)
- Last updated on: 22 April 2023.

Chris Tontz (born October 27, 1973) is an American tennis coach and former professional player.

Baltimore-born Tontz grew up in San Diego, as one of 10 siblings. He played collegiate tennis for UC Irvine before pursuing a professional career in the late 1990s. Most successful in doubles, he had two ATP Tour main draw appearances and won a Challenger tournament in Grenoble in 1999, reaching a best ranking of 162. As a coach he has worked with Sloane Stephens and currently coaches Claire Liu.

== ATP Challenger and ITF Futures finals ==
=== Doubles: 8 (4–4) ===
Legend ATP Challenger (1–2) ITF Futures (3–2)	Finals by surface Hard (2–3) Clay (2–1) Grass (0–0) Carpet (0–0)

Result	W–L	Date	Tournament	Tier	Surface	Partner	Opponents	Score
Loss	0–1	Mar 1998	Philippines F2, Manila	Futures	Hard	(United States) David Caldwell	(Chinese Taipei) Chih-Jung Chen (South Korea) Lee Hyung-taik	1–6, 4–6
Win	1–1	May 1998	USA F1, Delray Beach	Futures	Clay	(Sweden) Simon Aspelin	(Australia) Michael Hill (United States) Scott Humphries	6–4, 6–4
Win	2–1	May 1998	USA F2, Vero Beach	Futures	Clay	(Sweden) Simon Aspelin	(Norway) Lars Hjarrand (United States) Ross Loel	6–4, 6–2
Loss	2–2	Jun 1998	Weiden, Germany	Challenger	Clay	(Sweden) Simon Aspelin	(Portugal) Nuno Marques (Serbia) Nenad Zimonjic	4–6, 6–3, 3–6
Loss	2–3	Jul 1998	Aptos, United States	Challenger	Hard	(United States) Adam Peterson	(United States) Mike Bryan (United States) Bob Bryan	4–6, 4–6
Win	3–3	Dec 1998	USA F10, Phoenix	Futures	Hard	(Sweden) Simon Aspelin	(United States) Mike Bryan (United States) Bob Bryan	walkover
Win	4–3	Mar 1999	Grenoble, France	Challenger	Hard	(United States) Adam Peterson	(Argentina) Martín García (Brazil) Cristiano Testa	4–6, 6–3, 6–4
Loss	4–4	Jun 2000	Mexico F4, Cozumel	Futures	Hard	(United States) Brett Hansen-Dent	(Mexico) Marcelo Amador (Mexico) Miguel Gallardo-Valles	5–7, 6–7^{(5–7)}
