= Scott Humphries =

American tennis player

- Country (sports): United States
- Residence: Tampa, Florida, USA
- Born: May 26, 1976 (age 49); Greeley, Colorado, United States
- Height: 6 ft 1 in (1.85 m)
- Turned pro: 1995
- Plays: Right-handed
- College: Stanford University
- Prize money: $652,092

Singles
- Career record: 0–15
- Career titles: 0; 0 Challenger, 0 Futures
- Highest ranking: No. 260 (9 September 1996)

Grand Slam singles results
- Wimbledon: Q2 (1996)
- US Open: 1R (1995, 1996)

Doubles
- Career record: 102–130
- Career titles: 3; 14 Challenger, 1 Futures
- Highest ranking: No. 29 (30 October 2000)

Grand Slam doubles results
- Australian Open: SF (2001)
- French Open: 2R (2002)
- Wimbledon: QF (2004)
- US Open: 2R (1999, 2000, 2002)

Grand Slam mixed doubles results
- Australian Open: 1R (2001)
- French Open: 2R (2000)
- Wimbledon: QF (2001)
- US Open: QF (1999)

Scott Humphries (born May 26, 1976), is a retired professional tennis player from the United States.

Humphries reached a career-high singles ranking of world No. 260, achieved on 9 September 1996. He also reached a career-high doubles ranking of world No. 29, achieved on 30 October 2000.

Humphries won three titles on the ATP Tour across his career with all different partners, in straight sets and on hard courts. Partnering fellow American Justin Gimelstob, Humphries reached the semi-finals of the 2001 Australian Open doubles event, his best performance at a Grand Slam.

Humphries attended Stanford University for a year. He resides in Tampa, Florida according to the ATP.

== Junior career ==
As a junior, Humphries reach the doubles finals of two Grand Slam tournaments and finished runner up in both. At the 1993 Australian Open alongside compatriot Jimmy Jackson they lost 7–6, 5–7, 2–6 to German duo Lars Rehmann and Christian Tambue, and the then at the 1994 US Open playing with a different compatriot Paul Goldstein they lost to Nicolás Lapentti and Ben Ellwood 0–6, 2–6. Humphries won the 1994 Wimbledon Championships boys' singles title, defeating Mark Philippoussis of Australia 7–6, 3–6, 6–4 in the championship match.

== Junior Grand Slam finals ==
=== Singles: 1 (1 title) ===
Result	Year	Tournament	Surface	Opponent	Score
Win	1994	Wimbledon	Grass	(Australia) Mark Philippoussis	7–6, 3–6, 6–4

=== Doubles: 2 (2 runner-ups) ===
Result	Year	Tournament	Surface	Partner	Opponents	Score
Loss	1993	Australian Open	Hard	(United States) Jimmy Jackson	(Germany) Lars Rehmann (Germany) Christian Tambue	7–6, 5–7, 2–6
Loss	1994	US Open	Hard	(United States) Paul Goldstein	(Colombia) Nicolás Lapentti (Australia) Ben Ellwood	0–6, 2–6

== ATP Tour career finals ==
=== Doubles: 10 (3 titles, 7 runners-up) ===
Legend Grand Slam tournaments (0–0) ATP World Tour Finals (0–0) ATP World Tour Masters Series (0–0) ATP World Tour Championship Series (0–2) ATP World Tour International Series (3–5)	Finals by surface Hard (3–7) Clay (0–0) Grass (0–0) Carpet (0–0)	Finals by setting Outdoor (2–6) Indoor (1–1)

Result	W–L	Date	Tournament	Tier	Surface	Partner	Opponents	Score
Loss	0–1	Aug 1999	Long Island, United States	World Series	Hard	(United States) Jan-Michael Gambill	(France) Olivier Delaître (France) Fabrice Santoro	5–7, 4–6
Loss	0–2	Nov 1999	Stockholm Open, Sweden	World Series	Hard	(United States) Jan-Michael Gambill	(South Africa) Pieter Norval (South Africa) Kevin Ullyett	5–7, 3–6
Win	1–2	Feb 2000	San Jose, United States	International Series	Hard	(United States) Jan-Michael Gambill	(South Africa) Lucas Arnold Ker (United States) Eric Taino	6–1, 6–4
Loss	1–3	Feb 2000	London, United Kingdom	Championship Series	Hard	(United States) Jan-Michael Gambill	(South Africa) David Adams (South Africa) John-Laffnie de Jager	3–6, 7–6^{(9–7)}, 6–7^{(11–13)}
Loss	1–4	Jul 2000	Los Angeles Open, United States	World Series	Hard	(United States) Jan-Michael Gambill	(Australia) Paul Kilderry (Australia) Sandon Stolle	walkover
Loss	1–5	Aug 2000	Long Island, United States	World Series	Hard	(United States) Jan-Michael Gambill	(South Africa) Kevin Ullyett (United States) Jonathan Stark	4–6, 4–6
Win	2–5	Sep 2000	Tashkent, Uzbekistan	International Series	Hard	(United States) Justin Gimelstob	(South Africa) Marius Barnard (South Africa) Robbie Koenig	6–3, 6–2
Win	3–5	Sep 2002	Brasil Open, Brazil	World Series	Hard	(The Bahamas) Mark Merklein	(Brazil) Gustavo Kuerten (Brazil) André Sá	6–3, 7–6
Loss	3–6	Sep 2003	Brasil Open, Brazil	World Series	Hard	(The Bahamas) Mark Merklein	(Australia) Todd Perry (Japan) Thomas Shimada	2–6, 4–6
Loss	3–7	Oct 2003	Tokyo, Japan	Championship Series	Hard	(The Bahamas) Mark Merklein	(United States) Justin Gimelstob (Germany) Nicolas Kiefer	7–6^{(8–6)}, 3–6, 6–7^{(4–7)}

== ATP Challenger and ITF Futures finals ==
=== Doubles: 27 (15–12) ===
Legend ATP Challenger (14–10) ITF Futures (1–2)	Finals by surface Hard (13–10) Clay (0–1) Grass (0–1) Carpet (2–0)

Result	W–L	Date	Tournament	Tier	Surface	Partner	Opponents	Score
Win	1-0	Aug 1995	Binghamton, United States	Challenger	Hard	(United States) Adam Peterson	(Australia) Neil Borwick (Australia) Jamie Morgan	7-6, 6-2
Win	2-0	Aug 1996	Bronx, United States	Challenger	Hard	(United States) David Di Lucia	(South Africa) Chris Haggard (United Kingdom) Chris Wilkinson	6-4, 6-1
Win	3-0	Sep 1996	Champaign-Urbana, United States	Challenger	Hard	(United States) David Di Lucia	(United States) Brandon Coupe (United States) Trey Phillips	6-4, 6-2
Loss	3-1	May 1998	USA F1, Delray Beach	Futures	Clay	(Australia) Michael Hill	(Sweden) Simon Aspelin (United States) Chris Tontz	4-6, 4-6
Win	4-1	Jun 1998	Ireland F2, Dublin	Futures	Carpet	(Australia) Michael Hill	(South Africa) Jeff Coetzee (South Africa) Damien Roberts	3–6, 6–3, 6–2
Win	5-1	Aug 1998	Tijuana, Mexico	Challenger	Hard	(Australia) Michael Hill	(United States) Mitch Sprengelmeyer (United States) Eric Taino	6-3, 6-2
Loss	5-2	Oct 1998	Dallas, United States	Challenger	Hard	(Australia) Michael Hill	(United States) Jared Palmer (United States) Jonathan Stark	3-6, 4-6
Loss	5-3	Oct 1998	San Antonio, United States	Challenger	Hard	(Australia) Michael Hill	(United States) David Di Lucia (United States) Michael Sell	3-6, 1-6
Loss	5-4	Oct 1998	San Diego, United States	Challenger	Hard	(Australia) Michael Hill	(United States) Paul Goldstein (United States) Adam Peterson	2-6, 5-7
Loss	5-5	Jan 1999	USA F2, Miami	Futures	Hard	(United States) Jim Thomas	(United States) Bob Bryan (United States) Mike Bryan	3-6, 2-6
Loss	5-6	Jun 1999	Surbiton, United Kingdom	Challenger	Grass	(United States) Justin Gimelstob	(Australia) Todd Woodbridge (Australia) Scott Draper	walkover
Win	6-6	Jul 1999	Aptos, United States	Challenger	Hard	(Australia) Michael Hill	(Israel) Lior Mor (Israel) Harel Levy	7–6, 1–6, 7–5
Loss	6-7	Aug 1999	Lexington, United States	Challenger	Hard	(United States) Kevin Kim	(Romania) Gabriel Trifu (United States) Michael Sell	6–7, 7–6, 4–6
Loss	6-8	Nov 1999	Andorra la Vella, Andorra	Challenger	Hard	(Sweden) Peter Nyborg	(Spain) Jairo Velasco (Spain) Juan Ignacio Carrasco	5-7, 6-7
Loss	6-9	Dec 1999	Burbank, United States	Challenger	Hard	(United States) Cecil Mamiit	(United States) Bob Bryan (United States) Mike Bryan	6–7, 7–5, 1–6
Win	7-9	Nov 2001	Burbank, United States	Challenger	Hard	(United States) Chris Woodruff	(South Africa) Jeff Coetzee (Finland) Tuomas Ketola	7–5, 1–6, 6–4
Win	8-9	Feb 2002	Joplin, United States	Challenger	Hard	(United States) Justin Gimelstob	(United States) Glenn Weiner (South Africa) Paul Rosner	6-4, 7-6^{(7–3)}
Win	9-9	Aug 2002	Binghamton, United States	Challenger	Hard	(United States) Paul Goldstein	(Israel) Amir Hadad (United States) Robert Kendrick	4–6, 7–6^{(7–1)}, 7-5
Win	10-9	Sep 2002	Tulsa, United States	Challenger	Hard	(The Bahamas) Mark Merklein	(United States) Diego Ayala (United States) Jason Marshall	7–6^{(7–1)}, 6-4
Loss	10-10	Nov 2002	Nottingham, United Kingdom	Challenger	Hard	(The Bahamas) Mark Merklein	(Australia) Ashley Fisher (Australia) Stephen Huss	3-6, 6-7^{(5–7)}
Win	11-10	Nov 2002	Bratislava, Czech Republic	Challenger	Carpet	(The Bahamas) Mark Merklein	(Czech Republic) David Škoch (Czech Republic) Leoš Friedl	3–6, 6–4, 6–2
Win	12-10	Feb 2003	Dallas, United States	Challenger	Hard	(United States) Justin Gimelstob	(Argentina) Martín García (United States) Graydon Oliver	7–6^{(9–7)}, 7-6^{(7–4)}
Loss	12-11	Mar 2003	Cherbourg, France	Challenger	Hard	(United States) Brandon Coupe	(France) Benjamin Cassaigne (South Africa) Rik de Voest	7–6^{(19–17)}, 6–7^{(5–7)}, 6-7^{(11-13)}
Win	13-11	Apr 2003	Calabasas, United States	Challenger	Hard	(United States) Justin Gimelstob	(United States) Kevin Kim (United States) Jim Thomas	6-3, 6-3
Win	14-11	May 2003	Forest Hills, United States	Challenger	Hard	(United States) Justin Gimelstob	(United States) Huntley Montgomery (United States) Tripp Phillips	7–6^{(7–1)}, 3–6, 6-4
Loss	14-12	Nov 2003	Nottingham, United Kingdom	Challenger	Hard	(The Bahamas) Mark Merklein	(Israel) Amir Hadad (Israel) Harel Levy	4–6, 7–6^{(7–3)}, 3-6
Win	15-12	Feb 2004	Waikoloa, United States	Challenger	Hard	(United States) Brian Vahaly	(United States) Brandon Coupe (United States) Travis Parrott	6-3, 7-6^{(7–3)}

== Performance timelines ==
Key
W	F	SF	QF	#R	RR	Q#	DNQ	A	NH

(W) winner; (F) finalist; (SF) semifinalist; (QF) quarterfinalist; (#R) rounds 4, 3, 2, 1; (RR) round-robin stage; (Q#) qualification round; (DNQ) did not qualify; (A) absent; (NH) not held; (SR) strike rate (events won / competed); (W–L) win–loss record.

=== Singles ===
Tournament	1993	1994	1995	1996	1997	1998	1999	SR	W–L	Win %
Australian Open	A	A	A	A	A	A	A	0 / 0	0–0	–
French Open	A	A	A	A	A	A	A	0 / 0	0–0	–
Wimbledon	A	A	A	Q2	A	A	Q1	0 / 0	0–0	–
US Open	Q1	Q1	1R	1R	A	Q1	A	0 / 2	0–2	0%
Win–loss	0–0	0–0	0–1	0–1	0–0	0–0	0–0	0 / 2	0–2	0%
ATP Tour Masters 1000
Indian Wells	A	A	A	Q2	A	A	A	0 / 0	0–0	–
Miami Open	A	Q1	1R	Q2	Q1	A	A	0 / 1	0–1	0%
Canada Masters	A	A	Q2	A	A	A	A	0 / 0	0–0	–
Win–loss	0–0	0–0	0–1	0–0	0–0	0–0	0–0	0 / 1	0–1	0%

=== Doubles ===
Tournament	1994	1995	1996	1997	1998	1999	2000	2001	2002	2003	2004	SR	W–L	Win %
Australian Open	A	A	A	A	A	A	3R	SF	1R	1R	1R	0 / 5	6–5	55%
French Open	A	A	A	A	A	1R	1R	1R	2R	1R	1R	0 / 6	1–6	14%
Wimbledon	A	A	2R	A	A	1R	1R	1R	2R	1R	QF	0 / 7	5–7	42%
US Open	1R	1R	Q2	A	A	2R	2R	1R	2R	1R	1R	0 / 8	3–8	27%
Win–loss	0–1	0–1	1–1	0–0	0–0	1–3	3–4	4–4	3–4	0–4	3–4	0 / 26	15–26	37%
ATP Tour Masters 1000
Indian Wells	A	A	Q1	A	A	A	1R	1R	A	A	A	0 / 2	0–2	0%
Miami	A	1R	A	2R	A	1R	3R	3R	1R	1R	A	0 / 7	4–7	36%
Monte Carlo	A	A	A	A	A	A	2R	2R	A	A	A	0 / 2	2–2	50%
Rome	A	A	A	A	A	A	1R	1R	A	A	A	0 / 2	0–2	0%
Hamburg	Not Masters Series						2R	2R	A	A	A	0 / 2	2–2	50%
Canadian Open	A	A	A	A	A	A	A	2R	A	A	A	0 / 1	1–1	50%
Cincinnati	A	A	A	A	A	Q1	1R	1R	A	A	A	0 / 2	0–2	0%
Stuttgart	Not Masters Series						1R	A	Not Held			0 / 1	0–1	0%
Paris Masters	A	A	A	A	A	A	1R	A	A	A	A	0 / 1	0–1	0%
Win–loss	0–0	0–1	0–0	1–1	0–0	0–1	4–8	4–7	0–1	0–1	0–0	0 / 20	9–20	31%

=== Mixed doubles ===
Tournament	1995	1996	1997	1998	1999	2000	2001	2002	2003	2004	SR	W–L	Win %
Australian Open	A	A	A	A	A	A	1R	A	A	A	0 / 1	0–1	0%
French Open	A	A	A	A	A	2R	1R	A	A	A	0 / 2	1–2	33%
Wimbledon	A	A	A	A	2R	A	1R	A	QF	2R	0 / 4	5–4	56%
US Open	1R	A	A	1R	QF	2R	A	A	A	2R	0 / 5	4–5	44%
Win–loss	0–1	0–0	0–0	0–1	3–2	2–2	0–3	0–0	3–1	2–2	0 / 12	10–12	45%
