= Ben Ellwood =

Australian tennis player

- Country (sports): Australia
- Residence: South Melbourne. Australia
- Born: 12 March 1976 (age 50) Canberra, Australia
- Height: 5 ft 10 in (178 cm)
- Turned pro: 1994
- Plays: Right-handed
- Prize money: $388,461

Singles
- Career record: 4–14
- Career titles: 0; 2 Challenger, 3 Futures
- Highest ranking: No. 140 (28 October 1996)

Grand Slam singles results
- Australian Open: 2R (1996)
- French Open: Q2 (1996, 1998)
- Wimbledon: 1R (1997)
- US Open: 1R (1996)

Doubles
- Career record: 32–50
- Career titles: 0; 6 Challenger, 6 Futures
- Highest ranking: No. 66 (18 March 2002)

Grand Slam doubles results
- Australian Open: 3R (1999, 2000)
- French Open: 2R (2001)
- Wimbledon: 3R (2000)
- US Open: QF (1999)

Grand Slam mixed doubles results
- Australian Open: 2R (2002
- Wimbledon: 2R (2002)
- Last updated on: 1 February 2022.

Ben Ellwood (born 12 March 1976) is a former professional tennis player from Australia.

== Career ==
An outstanding junior, Ellwood won the boys' singles at the 1994 Australian Open, defeating Andrew Ilie in the final. He was the boys' doubles champion as well (with Mark Philippoussis) and also went on to win the boys' doubles at the 1994 Wimbledon Championships and 1994 US Open (with Philippousssis and Nicolás Lapentti, respectively). This made Ellwood the first ever player to win the boys' doubles at the Australian Open, Wimbledon Championships and US Open in the same year.

Ellwood made his Grand Slam debut in the 1995 Australian Open and came close to upsetting world number 46 Fabrice Santoro in the opening round. He lost the encounter in five sets, but had a chance to win the match in a fourth set tiebreak, which the Frenchman won 9–7. His only Grand Slam singles win came in Australia a year later, when he beat Olivier Delaître. As a doubles player he had much more success, with his best result being a quarter-finals berth at the 1999 US Open, with Michael Tebbutt as his partner. The pair defeated 10th seeds Yevgeny Kafelnikov and Daniel Vacek along the way. He also competed in the mixed doubles and made the second round of two Grand Slams in 2002, at the Australian Open and Wimbledon, both times with Evie Dominikovic. These would be the only two occasions he won a Grand Slam mixed doubles match but he only twice played with his younger sister, Annabel Ellwood, in the 1998 Australian Open and 1999 Wimbledon Championships.

On the ATP Tour, Ellwood made his only final when he and David Adams were doubles runners-up in the 2002 Delray Beach International Tennis Championships. Previously he had been a doubles quarter-finalist in Queen's with Michael Hill and made doubles semi-finals at Hong Kong in 1999 and Bucharest in 2001.

== Junior Grand Slam finals ==
=== Singles: 1 (1 title) ===
Result	Year	Tournament	Surface	Opponent	Score
Win	1994	Australian Open	Hard	(Australia) Andrew Ilie	5–7, 6–3, 6–3

=== Doubles: 4 (3 titles, 1 runner-up) ===
Result	Year	Tournament	Surface	Partner	Opponents	Score
Loss	1993	US Open	Hard	(Australia) James Sekulov	(South Africa) Neville Godwin (South Africa) Gareth Williams	3–6, 3–6
Win	1994	Australian Open	Hard	(Australia) Mark Philippoussis	(United Kingdom) Jamie Delgado (Slovakia) Roman Kukal	7–5, 7–6
Win	1994	Wimbledon	Grass	(Australia) Mark Philippoussis	(Slovakia) Vladimir Platenik (Brazil) Ricardo Schlachter	6–2, 6–4
Win	1994	US Open	Hard	(Ecuador) Nicolás Lapentti	(United States) Paul Goldstein (United States) Scott Humphries	6–0, 6–2

== ATP career finals ==
=== Doubles: 1 (1 runner-up) ===
Legend Grand Slam Tournaments (0–0) ATP World Tour Finals (0–0) ATP Masters Series (0–0) ATP Championship Series (0–0) ATP International Series (0–1)	Finals by surface Hard (0–1) Clay (0–0) Grass (0–0) Carpet (0–0)	Finals by setting Outdoors (0–1) Indoors (0–0)

Result	W–L	Date	Tournament	Tier	Surface	Partner	Opponents	Score
Loss	0–1	Mar 2002	Delray Beach, United States	International Series	Hard	(South Africa) David Adams	(Czech Republic) Martin Damm (Czech Republic) Cyril Suk	4–6, 7–6^{(7–5)}, [5–10]

== ATP Challenger and ITF Futures finals ==
=== Singles: 7 (5–2) ===
Legend ATP Challenger (2–0) ITF Futures (3–2)	Finals by surface Hard (0–0) Clay (1–1) Grass (4–0) Carpet (0–1)

Result	W–L	Date	Tournament	Tier	Surface	Opponent	Score
Win	1–0	Jul 1996	Bristol, United Kingdom	Challenger	Grass	(United Kingdom) Nick Weal	6–4, 6–3
Win	2–0	Jul 1996	Manchester, United Kingdom	Challenger	Grass	(Netherlands) Fernon Wibier	6–4, 6–4
Loss	2–1	Nov 1998	Australia F2, Frankston	Futures	Clay	(Australia) Toby Mitchell	6–3, 1–6, 5–7
Win	3–1	Nov 1998	Australia F3, Berri	Futures	Grass	(Australia) Glenn Knox	3–6, 6–3, 6–4
Loss	3–2	Feb 1999	Great Britain F3, Eastbourne	Futures	Carpet	(Germany) Jan Boruszewski	2–6, 3–6
Win	4–2	Oct 1999	Australia F1, Beaumaris	Futures	Clay	(Australia) Paul Baccanello	6–3, 6–2
Win	5–2	Nov 1999	Australia F3, Berri	Futures	Grass	(Australia) Dejan Petrovic	7–6, 6–1

=== Doubles: 21 (12–9) ===
Legend ATP Challenger (6–7) ITF Futures (6–2)	Finals by surface Hard (3–2) Clay (5–2) Grass (4–5) Carpet (0–0)

Result	W–L	Date	Tournament	Tier	Surface	Partner	Opponents	Score
Loss	0–1	Dec 1993	Perth, Australia	Challenger	Grass	(Australia) Mark Philippoussis	(Australia) Paul Kilderry (Australia) Brent Larkham	6–7, 3–6
Loss	0–2	Dec 1993	Adelaide, Australia	Challenger	Grass	(Australia) Mark Philippoussis	(Australia) Joshua Eagle (Australia) Andrew Florent	1–6, 3–6
Win	1–2	Dec 1994	Perth, Australia	Challenger	Grass	(Australia) Mark Philippoussis	(Australia) Wayne Arthurs (Australia) Neil Borwick	7–5, 7–6
Loss	1–3	Apr 1996	Nagoya, Japan	Challenger	Hard	(Australia) Peter Tramacchi	(Japan) Satoshi Iwabuchi (Japan) Takao Suzuki	6–7, 6–7
Loss	1–4	Jul 1997	Winnetka, United States	Challenger	Hard	(United States) Chad Clark	(United States) Michael Sell (South Africa) Myles Wakefield	3–6, 6–7
Win	2–4	Apr 1998	Great Britain F4, Bournemouth	Futures	Clay	(Sweden) Kalle Flygt	(United Kingdom) James Davidson (United Kingdom) James Fox	6–4, 6–3
Loss	2–5	Jul 1998	Bristol, United Kingdom	Challenger	Grass	(Australia) Wayne Arthurs	(Belarus) Max Mirnyi (Belarus) Vladimir Voltchkov	4–6, 6–3, 6–7
Loss	2–6	Jul 1998	Manchester, United Kingdom	Challenger	Grass	(Australia) Wayne Arthurs	(Italy) Mosé Navarra (Italy) Stefano Pescosolido	1–6, 7–6, 6–7
Win	3–6	Aug 1998	Lexington, United States	Challenger	Hard	(Australia) Lleyton Hewitt	(United States) Paul Goldstein (United States) Jim Thomas	5–7, 6–3, 6–2
Win	4–6	May 1999	Great Britain F6, Newcastle	Futures	Clay	(United Kingdom) Miles Maclagan	(South Africa) Damien Roberts (South Africa) Myles Wakefield	6–2, 6–4
Win	5–6	May 1999	Great Britain F7, Edinburgh	Futures	Clay	(United Kingdom) Miles Maclagan	(United Kingdom) Martin Lee (United Kingdom) Arvind Parmar	6–2, 6–3
Loss	5–7	Oct 1999	Australia F1, Beaumaris	Futures	Clay	(Australia) Dejan Petrovic	(Australia) Tim Crichton (Australia) Domenic Marafiote	6–7, 3–6
Win	6–7	Apr 2001	Great Britain F3, Bournemouth	Futures	Clay	(Australia) Todd Larkham	(Australia) Luke Bourgeois (Australia) Michael Tebbutt	7–6^{(7–4)}, 7–6^{(7–4)}
Win	7–7	May 2001	Great Britain F4, Hatfield	Futures	Clay	(Australia) Luke Bourgeois	(United Kingdom) Simon Dickson (United Kingdom) Mark Hilton	6–3, 6–3
Win	8–7	Jun 2001	Surbiton, United Kingdom	Challenger	Grass	(South Africa) David Adams	(South Africa) Jeff Coetzee (South Africa) Marcos Ondruska	7–6^{(7–5)}, 6–4
Win	9–7	Jul 2001	Manchester, United Kingdom	Challenger	Grass	(Sweden) Fredrik Lovén	(South Africa) Wesley Moodie (South Africa) Shaun Rudman	4–6, 7–5, 6–4
Loss	9–8	Sep 2001	Brașov, Romania	Challenger	Clay	(Sweden) Kalle Flygt	(Croatia) Lovro Zovko (Israel) Amir Hadad	1–6, 6–4, 4–6
Win	10–8	Nov 2001	Australia F5, Berri	Futures	Grass	(Australia) Dejan Petrovic	(Australia) Peter Luczak (Australia) David Hodge	7–6^{(8–6)}, 6–7^{(5–7)}, 6–3
Loss	10–9	Dec 2001	Australia F6, Barmera	Futures	Grass	(Australia) Dejan Petrovic	(Australia) Joseph Sirianni (Australia) Jaymon Crabb	2–6, 3–6
Win	11–9	Feb 2002	Brest, France	Challenger	Hard	(Australia) Stephen Huss	(Israel) Jonathan Erlich (Israel) Andy Ram	6–1, 6–4
Win	12–9	Feb 2002	Wrocław, Poland	Challenger	Hard	(Australia) Stephen Huss	(North Macedonia) Aleksandar Kitinov (Sweden) Johan Landsberg	6–7^{(3–7)}, 7–5, 7–6^{(8–6)}

== Performance timelines ==
Key
W	F	SF	QF	#R	RR	Q#	DNQ	A	NH

(W) winner; (F) finalist; (SF) semifinalist; (QF) quarterfinalist; (#R) rounds 4, 3, 2, 1; (RR) round-robin stage; (Q#) qualification round; (DNQ) did not qualify; (A) absent; (NH) not held; (SR) strike rate (events won / competed); (W–L) win–loss record.

=== Singles ===
Tournament	1993	1994	1995	1996	1997	1998	1999	2000	2001	2002	2003	SR	W–L	Win %
Grand Slam tournaments
Australian Open	Q2	Q1	1R	2R	1R	Q3	Q1	A	A	Q1	Q1	0 / 3	1–3	25%
French Open	A	A	A	Q2	A	Q2	A	A	A	A	A	0 / 0	0–0	–
Wimbledon	A	Q1	Q3	Q2	1R	Q3	Q3	A	A	A	A	0 / 1	0–1	0%
US Open	A	A	A	1R	Q1	Q2	A	A	A	A	A	0 / 1	0–1	0%
Win–loss	0–0	0–0	0–1	1–2	0–2	0–0	0–0	0–0	0–0	0–0	0–0	0 / 5	1–5	17%
ATP Masters Series
Miami	A	A	Q1	Q1	Q1	A	A	A	A	A	A	0 / 0	0–0	–
Hamburg	A	Q1	A	A	A	A	A	A	A	A	A	0 / 0	0–0	–
Rome	A	A	A	Q2	A	A	A	A	A	A	A	0 / 0	0–0	–
Win–loss	0–0	0–0	0–0	0–0	0–0	0–0	0–0	0–0	0–0	0–0	0–0	0 / 0	0–0	–

=== Doubles ===
Tournament	1995	1996	1997	1998	1999	2000	2001	2002	SR	W–L	Win %
Grand Slam tournaments
Australian Open	1R	1R	1R	1R	3R	3R	1R	1R	0 / 8	4–8	33%
French Open	A	A	A	A	A	1R	2R	1R	0 / 3	1–3	25%
Wimbledon	Q1	Q2	1R	Q1	Q2	3R	2R	1R	0 / 4	3–4	43%
US Open	A	Q1	A	A	QF	A	2R	2R	0 / 3	5–3	63%
Win–loss	0–1	0–1	0–2	0–1	5–2	4–3	3–4	1–4	0 / 18	13–18	42%
ATP Masters Series
Miami	A	A	A	A	A	A	A	2R	0 / 1	1–1	50%
Rome	A	Q1	A	A	A	A	A	A	0 / 0	0–0	–
Cincinnati	A	A	A	1R	A	A	A	A	0 / 1	0–1	0%
Win–loss	0–0	0–0	0–0	0–1	0–0	0–0	0–0	1–1	0 / 2	1–2	33%
