= Chris Groer =

American tennis player

- Country (sports): United States
- Born: September 10, 1974 (age 50)
- Prize money: $12,645

Singles
- Highest ranking: No. 393 (Sep 8, 1997)

Grand Slam singles results
- Australian Open: Q1 (1998)
- Wimbledon: Q1 (1999)

Doubles
- Career record: 1–1
- Highest ranking: No. 249 (Jun 21, 1999)

Grand Slam doubles results
- Wimbledon: Q2 (1999)

Chris Groer (born September 10, 1974) is an American former professional tennis player.

A native of Knoxville, Tennessee, Groer was a two-time state singles champion in high school tennis (Farragut HS) and went to Vanderbilt University on an academic scholarship. In 1996, his senior year, he became the first Vanderbilt player to earn All-American honors.

Groer played on the professional tour for three years and had a best singles ranking of 393. His best win came against world number 103 Leander Paes at the Winnetka Challenger in 1998 and he featured in the qualifying draw for the 1999 Wimbledon Championships. He made an ATP Tour main draw appearances as a doubles player in 2003, reaching the quarter-finals of the Legg Mason Classic.

Following his tennis career, Groer undertook postgraduate studies at the University of Georgia and University of Maryland. He has a PhD in applied mathematics.

In 2010 he was inducted into the Vanderbilt Sports Hall of Fame.

== ITF Futures titles ==
=== Doubles: (2) ===
No.	Date	Tournament	Surface	Partner	Opponents	Score
1.	Jun 1998	USA F5, Lafayette	Hard	(United States) Mitch Sprengelmeyer	(Israel) Lior Dahan (Israel) Raviv Weidenfeld	7–6, 7–5
2.	Dec 1998	USA F11, Clearwater	Hard	(United States) Mitch Sprengelmeyer	(France) Thierry Guardiola (United Kingdom) Miles Maclagan	6–7, 6–4, 7–5
