= Francesca Lubiani =

Italian tennis player

- Country (sports): Italy
- Residence: Bologna, Italy
- Born: 12 July 1977 (age 47); Bologna
- Height: 1.68 m (5 ft 6 in)
- Turned pro: 1992
- Retired: 2006
- Plays: Left-handed (two-handed both sides)
- Prize money: $421,264

Singles
- Career record: 294–311
- Career titles: 4 ITF
- Highest ranking: 58 (26 May 1997)

Grand Slam singles results
- Australian Open: 2R (1996, 1997)
- French Open: 2R (1996)
- Wimbledon: 1R (1996, 1997, 1998)
- US Open: 2R (1997)

Doubles
- Career record: 184–161
- Career titles: 15 ITF
- Highest ranking: 114 (15 August 2005)

Grand Slam doubles results
- Australian Open: 1R (2005)
- Wimbledon: Q2 (1999)

Francesca Lubiani (born 12 July 1977) is a former professional tennis player from Italy.

Her career-high singles ranking is world No. 58, which she reached on 26 May 1997. On 15 August 2005, she peaked at No. 114 in the doubles rankings.

== WTA career finals ==
=== Doubles: 1 (runner-up) ===
| Result | Date | Tournament | Tier | Surface | Partner | Opponents | Score |
|---|---|---|---|---|---|---|---|
| Loss | Jan 2005 | Auckland Open, New Zealand | Tier IV | Hard | (New Zealand) Leanne Baker | (Japan) Shinobu Asagoe (Slovenia) Katarina Srebotnik | 3–6, 3–6 |

== ITF Circuit finals ==
$75,000 tournaments
$50,000 tournaments
$25,000 tournaments
$10,000 tournaments

=== Singles: 6 (4–2) ===
| Outcome | No. | Date | Location | Surface | Opponent | Score |
|---|---|---|---|---|---|---|
| Winner | 1. | 27 February 1994 | ITF Albufeira, Portugal | Hard | (Italy) Stefania Pifferi | 6–2, 6–4 |
| Runner-up | 2. | 20 August 1995 | ITF Fayetteville, United States | Hard | (Australia) Annabel Ellwood | 6–7^{(2)}, 6–3, 1–6 |
| Runner-up | 3. | 15 November 1998 | ITF Hull, United Kingdom | Hard (i) | (Austria) Barbara Schwartz | 6–3, 3–6, 2–6 |
| Winner | 4. | 31 July 2000 | ITF Alghero, Italy | Hard | (Hungary) Zsófia Gubacsi | 6–1, 6–0 |
| Winner | 5. | 22 July 2001 | ITF Valladolid, Spain | Hard | (Netherlands) Anousjka van Exel | 7–6^{(8)}, 2–6, 6–4 |
| Winner | 6. | 15 July 2002 | ITF Valladolid, Spain | Hard | (Czech Republic) Olga Vymetálková | 6–2, 6–4 |

=== Doubles: 30 (15–15) ===
| Outcome | No. | Date | Tournament | Surface | Partner | Opponents | Score |
|---|---|---|---|---|---|---|---|
| Winner | 1. | 16 February 1992 | ITF Carvoeiro, Portugal | Hard | (Belgium) Raphaella Liziero | (Netherlands) Stephanie Gomperts (Netherlands) Sabine Verhaar | 6–4, 7–5 |
| Winner | 2. | 15 August 1994 | ITF Koksijde, Belgium | Clay | (Italy) Maria Paola Zavagli | (Italy) Giulia Casoni (Italy) Sara Ventura | 7–6^{(0)}, 7–5 |
| Runner-up | 3. | 9 November 1998 | ITF Hull, United, Kingdom | Hard (i) | (Italy) Maria Paola Zavagli | (Austria) Barbara Schwartz (Germany) Jasmin Wöhr | 2–6, 3–6 |
| Runner-up | 4. | 26 April 1999 | ITF Espinho, Portugal | Clay | (Italy) Maria Paola Zavagli | (Hungary) Katalin Marosi (Spain) Alicia Ortuño | 3–6, 4–6 |
| Runner-up | 5. | 17 October 1999 | ITF Largo, United States | Hard | (United States) Samantha Reeves | (United States) Nicole Arendt (Japan) Nana Smith | 2–6, 3–6 |
| Runner-up | 6. | 11 June 2000 | ITF Surbiton, United Kingdom | Grass | (Italy) Caroline Dhenin | (Australia) Trudi Musgrave (Australia) Bryanne Stewart | 6–3, 3–6, 1–6 |
| Winner | 7. | 21 July 2001 | ITF Valladolid, Spain | Hard | (Germany) Nina Dübbers | (Hungary) Adrienn Hegedűs (Hungary) Eszter Molnár | 6–2, 7–6^{(4)} |
| Winner | 8. | 24 September 2002 | ITF Albuquerque, United States | Hard | (Venezuela) Milagros Sequera | (Ukraine) Tatiana Perebiynis (Australia) Christina Wheeler | 1–6, 7–5, 7–5 |
| Runner-up | 9. | 30 March 2003 | ITF Atlanta, United States | Hard | (New Zealand) Leanne Baker | (China) Li Ting (China) Sun Tiantian | 6–4, 4–6, 4–6 |
| Winner | 10. | 7 September 2003 | ITF Mestre, Italy | Clay | (New Zealand) Leanne Baker | (Australia) Monique Adamczak (New Zealand) Shelley Stephens | 6–2, 4–6, 6–2 |
| Runner-up | 11. | 28 September 2003 | ITF Glasgow, United Kingdom | Hard | (New Zealand) Leanne Baker | (Netherlands) Kim Kilsdonk (Australia) Nicole Kriz | 5–7, 2–6 |
| Runner-up | 12. | 8 February 2004 | ITF Rockford, United States | Hard (i) | (New Zealand) Leanne Baker | (Argentina) Mariana Díaz Oliva (Argentina) Gisela Dulko | 7–6^{(5)}, 3–6, 1–6 |
| Runner-up | 13. | 22 February 2004 | ITF Columbus, United States | Hard (i) | (New Zealand) Leanne Baker | (Slovakia) Stanislava Hrozenská (Czech Republic) Lenka Němečková | 6–7^{(3)}, 6–4, 3–6 |
| Winner | 14. | 28 February 2004 | ITF St. Paul, United States | Hard (i) | (New Zealand) Leanne Baker | (United States) Jessica Lehnhoff (Australia) Trudi Musgrave | 6–7^{(3)}, 2–3 ret. |
| Winner | 15. | 4 April 2004 | ITF Augusta, United States | Hard | (United States) Mashona Washington | (United States) Julie Ditty (United States) Jessica Lehnhoff | 6–1, 6–3 |
| Winner | 16. | 5 October 2004 | ITF Glasgow, United Kingdom | Hard (i) | (New Zealand) Leanne Baker | (Republic of Ireland) Claire Curran (Turkey) İpek Şenoğlu | 6–3, 5–7, 6–4 |
| Winner | 17. | 19 December 2004 | ITF Bergamo, Italy | Hard (i) | (Italy) Giulia Casoni | (Czech Republic) Lenka Němečková (Germany) Julia Schruff | 6–2, 6–3 |
| Winner | 18. | 13 February 2005 | ITF Redbridge, United Kingdom | Hard (i) | (Italy) Giulia Casoni | (Belarus) Darya Kustova (Russia) Ekaterina Makarova | 6–4, 6–3 |
| Runner-up | 19. | 20 March 2005 | ITF Orange, United States | Hard | (New Zealand) Leanne Baker | (United States) Carly Gullickson (United States) Jennifer Hopkins | 3–6, 4–6 |
| Runner-up | 20. | 27 March 2005 | ITF Redding, United States | Hard | (New Zealand) Leanne Baker | (Ukraine) Yuliya Beygelzimer (Canada) Stéphanie Dubois | 4–6, 7–6^{(1)}, 3–6 |
| Winner | 21. | 11 April 2005 | ITF Mumbai, India | Hard | (Russia) Nina Bratchikova | (India) Rushmi Chakravarthi (India) Sai Jayalakshmy Jayaram | 6–3, 6–4 |
| Winner | 22. | 9 July 2005 | ITF Felixstowe, United Kingdom | Grass | (New Zealand) Leanne Baker | (Australia) Jarmila Gajdošová (Russia) Alla Kudryavtseva | 6–1, 4–6, 3–2 ret. |
| Runner-up | 23. | 21 August 2005 | ITF Jesi, Italy | Hard | (New Zealand) Leanne Baker | (Italy) Silvia Disderi (Italy) Giulia Gabba | 2–6, 6–2, 4–6 |
| Winner | 24. | 28 August 2005 | ITF Trecastagni, Italy | Hard | (New Zealand) Leanne Baker | (Russia) Regina Kulikova (Russia) Marina Shamayko | 6–2, 4–6, 6–3 |
| Runner-up | 25. | 11 October 2005 | ITF San Francisco, United States | Hard | (United States) Angela Haynes | (United States) Ansley Cargill (United States) Tara Snyder | 6–7^{(2)}, 5–7 |
| Runner-up | 26. | 13 November 2005 | ITF Mexico City | Clay | (Italy) Valentina Sassi | (Brazil) Jenifer Widjaja (Brazil) Carla Tiene | 6–7^{(5)}, 3–6 |
| Winner | 27. | 22 November 2005 | ITF San Luis Potosí, Mexico | Hard | (Italy) Valentina Sassi | (Brazil) Jenifer Widjaja (Poland) Olga Brózda | 6–3, 4–6, 7–5 |
| Runner-up | 28. | 18 December 2005 | ITF Bergamo, Italy | Carpet (i) | (Italy) Valentina Sassi | (Russia) Marina Shamayko (Russia) Ekaterina Bychkova | 1–6, 3–6 |
| Runner-up | 29. | 5 February 2006 | ITF Taupo, New Zealand | Hard | (New Zealand) Leanne Baker | (United States) Lauren Barnikow (United States) Christina Fusano | 4–6, 4–6 |
| Winner | 30. | 1 May 2006 | ITF Catania, Italy | Clay | (Italy) Valentina Sassi | (France) Diana Brunel (France) Virginie Pichet | w/o |
