= Amir Hadad =

Israeli tennis player (born 1978)

- Native name: אמיר חדד
- Country (sports): Israel
- Born: 17 February 1978 (age 48) Ramla, Israel
- Height: 1.82 m (6 ft 0 in)
- Turned pro: N/A
- Plays: Right-handed
- Prize money: US$269,231

Singles
- Career record: 6–8 (at ATP Tour level, Grand Slam level, and in Davis Cup)
- Career titles: 0; 1 Challenger, 4 Futures
- Highest ranking: No. 180 (14 Apr 2003)

Grand Slam singles results
- Australian Open: Q3 (2003, 2004)
- French Open: 2R (2002)
- Wimbledon: Q3 (1998)
- US Open: Q3 (2002)

Doubles
- Career record: 8–12 (at ATP Tour level, Grand Slam level, and in Davis Cup)
- Career titles: 0; 12 Challenger, 15 Futures
- Highest ranking: No. 87 (19 May 2003)

Grand Slam doubles results
- Wimbledon: 3R (2002)
- US Open: 2R (2002)

Team competitions
- Davis Cup: SF (2009)
- Last updated on: 24 Jun 2026.

Amir Hadad (Hebrew: אמיר חדד; born 17 February 1978) is a retired Israeli professional tennis player. His highest singles ATP ranking was World No. 180, achieved in April 2003, and his highest doubles ranking was No. 87, achieved in May 2003.

== Tennis career ==
Hadad turned pro in 1995. Most of his success has been on the challenger and future circuits. In May 2002, in the first round of the French Open, he upset world No. 78 Christophe Rochus of Belgium, 6–1, 6–2, 6–7 (4,) 6–2. Hadad has trained at the Israel Tennis Centers.

In mid-July 2002, Amir and his partner Martín Vassallo Argüello won the Seascape Challenger Tournament doubles final. His best result was reaching the 3rd round doubles at the 2002 Wimbledon Open, with partner Aisam-ul-Haq Qureshi of Pakistan. The Israeli and Pakistani team received major criticism because of political tensions, but Hadad and Aisam dedicated their run to peace. They won an upset victory in the 2nd round over the No. 11 seeded team of Ellis Ferreira and Rick Leach. On 6 February 2003, Hadad and Qureshi were awarded the Arthur Ashe Humanitarian Award.

"We like the idea. We think there's nothing like sports to bridge the gap between nations and to be the start of solving problems."

— David Harnik, president of Israel's tennis federation

Hadad won tournaments in Groningen, Kyoto, Rome, San Remo, and Vietnam in 2003.

In April 2005 Hadad and partner Harel Levy won a F1 doubles title in Hungary. Hadad enjoyed his best singles performance in years at the Hungary F3 tournament held in Hódmezővásárhely during May 2005. He lost to the eventual champion Boris Pašanski in the finals, 7–6, 6–1. Later in 2005, Hadad and Levy won the Hungary F1 tournament in Budapest, defeating Nikola Martinovic and Josko Topic 5–7, 6–2, 6–1 in the final. They beat Bastian Knittel and Marius Zay 6–1, 6–0 to capture the F2 title in Miskolc. Levy and Hadad then competed in May in Fürth, where they took the title from Jan Frode Andersen and Johan Landsberg, 6–1, 6–2. In July they won at Budaors, Hungary, defeating Adam Chadaj and Stephane Robert 6–4, 6–7(7), 6–3.

In February 2006, he won a F1 tournament in Israel. In May 2006, playing with Konstantinos Economidis, he won in Rome. In November 2007, he won tournaments in Israel with Lazar Magdinčev (MKD) and Harel Levy.

In May 2008 he won in Hungary with Stefan Wauters. In September and October he won with Attila Balázs in Bosnia & Herzegovina and Croatia.

=== Davis Cup ===
Hadad played Davis Cup for Israel from 1998 to 2009, winning 5 of his 12 matches.

=== World TeamTennis ===
Hadad played World TeamTennis for the Boston Lobsters in 2006, 2007 and 2008. He played for the St. Louis Aces in 2003 and 2004.

== Personal life ==
Hadad is of Tunisian-Jewish descent.

== ATP Challenger and ITF Futures finals ==
=== Singles: 11 (5–6) ===
Legend ATP Challenger (1–0) ITF Futures (4–6)	Finals by surface Hard (4–5) Clay (0–1) Grass (1–0) Carpet (0–0)

Result	W–L	Date	Tournament	Tier	Surface	Opponent	Score
Win	1–0	Jan 1999	India F1, Chandigarh	Futures	Grass	(Israel) Jonathan Erlich	6–3, 6–4
Loss	1–1	Jun 1999	Ireland F2, Dublin	Futures	Hard	(Israel) Nir Welgreen	3–6, 2–6
Loss	1–2	Nov 1999	Greece F6, Iraklio	Futures	Hard	(Spain) Oscar Burrieza-Lopez	3–6, 6–3, 3–6
Loss	1–3	Feb 2001	Cuba F1, Havana	Futures	Hard	(Argentina) Gustavo Marcaccio	2–6, 2–6
Win	2–3	Mar 2003	Ho Chi Minh City, Vietnam	Challenger	Hard	(Kazakhstan) Yuriy Schukin	6–4, 7–6^{(7–2)}
Loss	2–4	May 2005	Hungary F3, Hódmezővásárhely	Futures	Clay	(Serbia) Boris Pashanski	6–7^{(2–7)}, 1–6
Win	3–4	Jun 2005	Turkey F2, Istanbul	Futures	Hard	(Ukraine) Serhii Yaroshenko	3–6, 6–2, 6–0
Loss	3–5	Dec 2005	Israel F3, Ra'anana	Futures	Hard	(Germany) Sebastian Rieschick	4–6, 7–6^{(7–1)}, 3–6
Win	4–5	Jan 2006	China F2, Jiangmen	Futures	Hard	(Netherlands) Melvyn Op Der Heijde	7–5, 6–4
Win	5–5	Feb 2006	Israel F1, Ramat HaSharon	Futures	Hard	(Israel) Dekel Valtzer	6–4, 6–3
Loss	5–6	Jan 2009	Israel F1, Eilat	Futures	Hard	(Hungary) Attila Balazs	1–6, 3–6

=== Doubles: 44 (27–17) ===
Legend ATP Challenger (12–10) ITF Futures (15–7)	Finals by surface Hard (10–12) Clay (15–4) Grass (1–0) Carpet (1–1)

Result	W–L	Date	Tournament	Tier	Surface	Partner	Opponents	Score
Loss	0–1	Mar 1998	Israel F1, Jaffa	Futures	Hard	(Israel) Jonathan Erlich	(Finland) Tapio Nurminen (Finland) Janne Ojala	2–6, 5–7
Win	1–1	Jan 1999	India F1, Chandigarh	Futures	Grass	(Israel) Jonathan Erlich	(France) Cedric Kauffmann (United States) Fazal Syed	5–7, 7–5, 6–4
Loss	1–2	Mar 1999	Israel F2, Ashkelon	Futures	Hard	(Israel) Harel Levy	(Israel) Jonathan Erlich (Israel) Eyal Erlich	4–6, 2–6
Win	2–2	Apr 1999	France F5, Saint-Brieuc	Futures	Clay	(France) Regis Lavergne	(Belgium) David Basile (France) Stephane Matheu	7–5, 1–6, 6–3
Loss	2–3	Jun 1999	Ireland F1, Dublin	Futures	Carpet	(Israel) Jonathan Erlich	(Italy) Daniele Bracciali (Italy) Igor Gaudi	4–6, 6–3, 3–6
Win	3–3	Sep 1999	Turkey F6, Antalya	Futures	Clay	(Israel) Andy Ram	(Slovakia) Martin Hromec (Slovakia) Vladimir Platenik	6–4, 6–4
Loss	3–4	Oct 1999	Tel Aviv, Israel	Challenger	Hard	(Australia) Andrew Ilie	(Israel) Noam Behr (Israel) Eyal Ran	3–6, 3–6
Loss	3–5	Nov 1999	Greece F6, Iraklio	Futures	Hard	(United Kingdom) Barry Cowan	(Croatia) Davor Grgic (Netherlands) Djalmar Sistermans	2–6, 4–6
Win	4–5	Jul 2000	Hungary F5, Budapest	Futures	Clay	(Slovakia) Vladimir Platenik	(New Zealand) Lee Radovanovich (Brazil) Rodrigo Ribeiro	6–2, 6–7^{(2–7)}, 6–4
Win	5–5	Aug 2000	Great Britain F6, Bath	Futures	Hard	(United Kingdom) Miles MacLagan	(South Africa) Vaughan Snyman (South Africa) Haydn Wakefield	5–4^{(7–4)}, 5–4^{(7–4)}, 5–3
Win	6–5	Feb 2001	Cuba F1, Havana	Futures	Hard	(Israel) Assaf Drori	(Austria) Ronald Dueller (Jamaica) Jermaine Smith	7–6^{(9–7)}, 7–5
Loss	6–6	Aug 2001	Binghamton, United States	Challenger	Hard	(Canada) Andrew Nisker	(Canada) Bobby Kokavec (Canada) Frederic Niemeyer	6–2, 4–6, 1–6
Win	7–6	Sep 2001	Brasov, Romania	Challenger	Clay	(Croatia) Lovro Zovko	(Australia) Ben Ellwood (Sweden) Kalle Flygt	6–1, 4–6, 6–4
Win	8–6	Mar 2002	Ho Chi Minh City, Vietnam	Challenger	Hard	(Austria) Alexander Peya	(Australia) Jaymon Crabb (Australia) Peter Luczak	7–6^{(7–2)}, 7–5
Win	9–6	Jul 2002	Aptos, United States	Challenger	Hard	(Argentina) Martin Vassallo Arguello	(United States) Brandon Coupe (United States) Brandon Hawk	6–4, 6–4
Loss	9–7	Aug 2002	Binghamton, United States	Challenger	Hard	(United States) Robert Kendrick	(United States) Paul Goldstein (United States) Scott Humphries	6–4, 6–7^{(1–7)}, 5–7
Win	10–7	Mar 2003	Kyoto, Japan	Challenger	Carpet	(Israel) Andy Ram	(Czech Republic) Jan Hajek (Chinese Taipei) Jimmy Wang	3–6, 6–3, 6–1
Win	11–7	Apr 2003	San Remo, Italy	Challenger	Clay	(Italy) Daniele Bracciali	(Spain) Joan Balcells (Spain) Juan Albert Viloca	6–2, 6–4
Loss	11–8	Apr 2003	Napoli, Italy	Challenger	Clay	(Belgium) Christophe Rochus	(Italy) Massimo Bertolini (Italy) Giorgio Galimberti	6–2, 5–7, 4–6
Win	12–8	May 2003	Rome, Italy	Challenger	Clay	(Argentina) Martin Vassallo Arguello	(Italy) Manuel Jorquera (Argentina) Diego Moyano	6–4, 3–6, 6–3
Loss	12–9	Sep 2003	Istanbul, Turkey	Challenger	Hard	(Israel) Harel Levy	(Israel) Jonathan Erlich (Israel) Andy Ram	6–7^{(5–7)}, 6–7^{(6–8)}
Win	13–9	Oct 2003	Groningen, Netherlands	Challenger	Hard	(Israel) Harel Levy	(Netherlands) Fred Hemmes (Netherlands) Raemon Sluiter	6–4, 6–4
Win	14–9	Nov 2003	Nottingham, United Kingdom	Challenger	Hard	(Israel) Harel Levy	(United States) Scott Humphries (The Bahamas) Mark Merklein	6–4, 6–7^{(3–7)}, 6–3
Win	15–9	May 2005	Hungary F1, Budapest	Futures	Clay	(Israel) Harel Levy	(Croatia) Nikola Martinovic (Croatia) Josko Topic	5–7, 6–2, 6–1
Win	16–9	May 2005	Hungary F2, Miskolc	Futures	Clay	(Israel) Harel Levy	(Germany) Bastian Knittel (Germany) Marius Zay	6–1, 6–0
Loss	16–10	May 2005	Budapest, Hungary	Challenger	Clay	(Israel) Harel Levy	(Australia) Stephen Huss (Sweden) Johan Landsberg	6–7^{(4–7)}, 1–6
Win	17–10	Jun 2005	Furth, Germany	Challenger	Clay	(Israel) Harel Levy	(Norway) Jan-Frode Andersen (Sweden) Johan Landsberg	6–1, 6–2
Win	18–10	Jul 2005	Budaors, Hungary	Challenger	Clay	(Israel) Harel Levy	(Poland) Adam Chadaj (France) Stephane Robert	6–4, 6–7^{(7–9)}, 6–3
Loss	18–11	Jan 2006	China F1, Jiangmen	Futures	Hard	(Moldova) Laurent Recouderc	(South Korea) Woong-Sun Jun (South Korea) Sun-Yong Kim	3–6, 6–3, 6–7^{(3–7)}
Loss	18–12	Jan 2006	China F2, Jiangmen	Futures	Hard	(Serbia) Aleksandar Vlaski	(South Korea) Woong-Sun Jun (South Korea) Sun-Yong Kim	6–2, 1–6, 0–6
Loss	18–13	Apr 2006	Chiasso, switzerland	Challenger	Clay	(Croatia) Roko Karanusic	(Italy) Leonardo Azzaro (Croatia) Lovro Zovko	2–6, 5–7
Win	19–13	May 2006	Rome, Italy	Challenger	Clay	(Greece) Konstantinos Economidis	(Italy) Manuel Jorquera (Italy) Giancarlo Petrazzuolo	6–4, 4–6, [10–5]
Win	20–13	Nov 2007	Israel F4, Ramat Hasharon	Futures	Hard	(Macau) Lazar Magdinchev	(France) Xavier Audouy (France) Trystan Meniane	6–0, 6–2
Win	21–13	Dec 2007	Israel F5, Ramat Hasharon	Futures	Hard	(Israel) Harel Levy	(Russia) Sergey Betov (Ukraine) Denys Molchanov	6–7^{(7–9)}, 6–4, [10–3]
Win	22–13	May 2008	Hungary F2, Godollo	Futures	Clay	(Belgium) Stefan Wauters	(Hungary) Attila Balazs (Hungary) Gyorgy Balazs	7–6^{(8–6)}, 6–2
Win	23–13	Sep 2008	Banja Luka, Bosnia & Herzegovina	Challenger	Clay	(Hungary) Attila Balazs	(Australia) Rameez Junaid (Germany) Philipp Marx	7–5, 6–2
Win	24–13	Oct 2008	Croatia F10, Dubrovnik	Futures	Clay	(Hungary) Attila Balazs	(Croatia) Mislav Hizak (Croatia) Josko Topic	6–4, 6–2
Win	25–13	Oct 2008	Croatia F11, Dubrovnik	Futures	Clay	(Hungary) Attila Balazs	(Greece) Alexandros Jakoubovits (Austria) Max Raditschnigg	6–3, 6–1
Loss	25–14	Nov 2008	Israel F4, Ramat Hasharon	Futures	Hard	(Austria) Andreas Haider-Maurer	(Germany) Bastian Knittel (Austria) Max Raditschnigg	7–6^{(10–8)}, 6–7^{(8–10)}, [5–10]
Win	26–14	Nov 2008	Israel F5, Ramat Hasharon	Futures	Hard	(Canada) Pierre-Ludovic Duclos	(Germany) Sebastian Rieschick (Israel) Amir Weintraub	6–3, 6–4
Win	27–14	Jan 2009	Israel F1, Eilat	Futures	Hard	(Hungary) Attila Balazs	(Bosnia and Herzegovina) Ismar Gorcic (Croatia) Petar Jelenic	6–1, 6–0
Loss	27–15	Jul 2009	Lexington, United States	Challenger	Hard	(Israel) Harel Levy	(South Africa) Kevin Anderson (United States) Ryler Deheart	4–6, 6–4, [6–10]
Loss	27–16	Aug 2009	Granby, Canada	Challenger	Hard	(Israel) Harel Levy	(United Kingdom) Colin Fleming (United Kingdom) Ken Skupski	3–6, 6–7^{(6–8)}
Loss	27–17	Sep 2009	Genova, Italy	Challenger	Clay	(Israel) Harel Levy	(Italy) Daniele Bracciali (Italy) Alessandro Motti	4–6, 2–6

== Performance Timelines ==
Key
W	F	SF	QF	#R	RR	Q#	P#	DNQ	A	Z#	PO	G	S	B	NMS	NTI	P	NH

(W) winner; (F) finalist; (SF) semifinalist; (QF) quarterfinalist; (#R) rounds 4, 3, 2, 1; (RR) round-robin stage; (Q#) qualification round; (P#) preliminary round; (DNQ) did not qualify; (A) absent; (Z#) Davis/Fed Cup Zonal Group (with number indication) or (PO) play-off; (G) gold, (S) silver or (B) bronze Olympic/Paralympic medal; (NMS) not a Masters tournament; (NTI) not a Tier I tournament; (P) postponed; (NH) not held; (SR) strike rate (events won / competed); (W–L) win–loss record.

=== Singles ===
Tournament	1996	1997	1998	1999	2000	2001	2002	2003	2004	2005	2006	SR	W–L	Win%
Grand Slam tournaments
Australian Open	A	A	Q1	A	A	A	Q2	Q3	Q3	A	A	0 / 0	0–0	–
French Open	A	A	Q1	A	A	A	2R	Q1	A	A	A	0 / 1	1–1	50%
Wimbledon	Q2	A	Q3	Q1	A	A	Q2	Q1	A	A	Q1	0 / 0	0–0	–
US Open	A	A	Q1	Q1	A	A	Q3	Q2	A	A	A	0 / 0	0–0	–
Win–loss	0–0	0–0	0–0	0–0	0–0	0–0	1–1	0–0	0–0	0–0	0–0	0 / 1	1–1	50%
ATP Masters 1000 Series
Canada	A	A	A	A	A	A	Q1	Q1	A	A	A	0 / 0	0–0	–
Win–loss	0–0	0–0	0–0	0–0	0–0	0–0	0–0	0–0	0–0	0–0	0–0	0 / 0	0–0	–

== See also ==
- List of select Jewish tennis players

Awards
Preceded by Andre Agassi	ATP Arthur Ashe Humanitarian of the Year; 2002 with Aisam-ul-Haq Qureshi	Succeeded by Gustavo Kuerten
