= Mirka Federer =

Swiss former tennis player, wife of Roger Federer

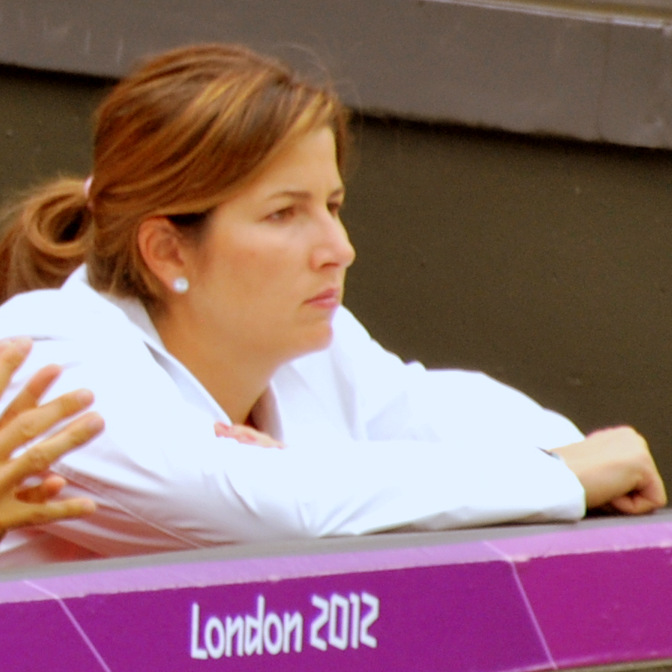
- Mirka during the 2012 Olympics
- Country (sports): Switzerland
- Residence: Bottmingen, Switzerland
- Born: 1 April 1978 (age 48) Bojnice, Czechoslovakia
- Height: 1.74 m (5 ft 9 in)
- Turned pro: 15 January 1998
- Retired: 2002
- Plays: Right-handed (two-handed backhand)
- Prize money: $260,832

Singles
- Career record: 202–159
- Career titles: 0
- Highest ranking: No. 76 (10 September 2001)

Grand Slam singles results
- Australian Open: 2R (2000, 2001)
- French Open: 1R (1999, 2000, 2001)
- Wimbledon: 1R (2000, 2001)
- US Open: 3R (2001)

Other tournaments
- Olympic Games: 1R (2000)

Doubles
- Career record: 38–68
- Career titles: 0
- Highest ranking: No. 214 (24 August 1998)

Grand Slam doubles results
- Wimbledon: Q2 (1999)

Other doubles tournaments
- Olympic Games: 1R (2000)

Miroslava "Mirka" Federer (born Miroslava Vavrincová on 1 April 1978, later Miroslava Vavrinec) is a Swiss former professional tennis player of Slovak origin.

She is married to tennis player Roger Federer, having first met him at the 2000 Summer Olympics. She retired from professional tennis in 2002 due to a persistent foot injury. By the time she closed her career, she was a top-100 ranked player.

== Early life and tennis career ==
Born in Bojnice (then Czechoslovakia), Miroslava emigrated to Switzerland when she was two years old. In 1987, when she was nine, her father took her to watch a tournament at Filderstadt in Germany. Mirka met Martina Navratilova, who thought she looked athletic and should try tennis. Navratilova later sent her a racquet and arranged for her first tennis lesson.

In 2002, she teamed up with Roger Federer in the Hopman Cup. Her best Grand Slam performance was in 2001, when she reached the third round of the US Open.

However, a recurring foot injury prevented Vavrinec from progressing further up the rankings, eventually forcing her retirement from competitive tennis in 2002. Following her retirement, she took on the role of Federer's public relations manager, traveling with him on tour, often seen attending his matches. Prior to her retirement, she was ranked in the mid-80s, with a career high of No. 76, during the 2001 season.

== Personal life ==
Mirka married Roger Federer on 11 April 2009. They were married at Wenkenhof Villa in Riehen near Basel, surrounded by a small group of close friends and family. In 2009, Mirka gave birth to identical twin girls, Myla and Charlene. The Federers had another set of twins in 2014, this time fraternal twin boys, Leo and Lenny.

== Grand Slam singles performance timeline ==
Key
W	F	SF	QF	#R	RR	Q#	DNQ	A	NH

(W) winner; (F) finalist; (SF) semifinalist; (QF) quarterfinalist; (#R) rounds 4, 3, 2, 1; (RR) round-robin stage; (Q#) qualification round; (DNQ) did not qualify; (A) absent; (NH) not held; (SR) strike rate (events won / competed); (W–L) win–loss record.

Tournament	1999	2000	2001	Career W-L
Australian Open	A	2R	2R	2–2
French Open	1R	1R	1R	0–3
Wimbledon	Q2	1R	1R	0–2
US Open	Q2	1R	3R	2–2
Win–loss	0–1	1–4	3–4	4–9

== ITF Circuit finals ==
$100,000 tournaments
$75,000 tournaments
$50,000 tournaments
$25,000 tournaments
$10,000 tournaments

=== Singles: 13 (3–10) ===
Outcome	No.	Date	Tournament	Surface	Opponent	Score
Runner-up	1.	12 September 1994	ITF Cluj, Romania	Clay	(Czech Republic) Adriana Gerši	2–6, 1–6
Runner-up	2.	23 January 1995	ITF Bastad, Sweden	Hard	(Hungary) Katalin Miskolczi	6–1, 2–6, 5–7
Winner	3.	8 March 1997	ITF Tel Aviv, Israel	Hard	(Israel) Nataly Cahana	6–3, 7–6
Runner-up	4.	2 June 1997	ITF Bytom, Poland	Clay	(Czech Republic) Jana Pospíšilová	6–7, 7–6, 1–6
Winner	5.	22 June 1997	ITF Klosters, Switzerland	Clay	(Austria) Evelyn Fauth	4–6, 7–5, 6–2
Runner-up	6.	30 June 1997	ITF Lohja, Finland	Clay	(Sweden) Maria Persson	6–3, 4–6, 3–6
Runner-up	7.	12 January 1998	ITF Delray Beach, United States	Hard	(United Kingdom) Louise Latimer	2–6, 0–6
Runner-up	8.	18 January 1999	ITF Boca Raton, United States	Hard	(Chinese Taipei) Stephanie Chi	1–6, 3–6
Winner	9.	31 January 1999	ITF Clearwater, United States	Hard	(Russia) Alina Jidkova	6–0, 7–6
Runner-up	10.	8 February 1999	ITF Rockford, United States	Hard (i)	(United Kingdom) Samantha Smith	4–6, 4–6
Runner-up	11.	15 March 1999	ITF Noda, Japan	Hard	(Japan) Shinobu Asagoe	5–7, 4–6
Runner-up	12.	30 August 1999	ITF Huixquilucan, Mexico	Hard	(Canada) Vanessa Webb	6–1, 4–6, 6–7
Runner-up	13.	14 August 1999	ITF İstanbul, Turkey	Hard	(Ukraine) Tatiana Perebiynis	4–6, 3–6

=== Doubles: 4 (1–3) ===
Outcome	No.	Date	Tournament	Surface	Partner	Opponents	Score
Winner	1.	18 October 1993	ITF Langenthal, Switzerland	Carpet (i)	(Switzerland) Natalie Tschan	(France) Anne De Gioanni (Austria) Heidi Sprung	6–4, 4–6, 6–1
Runner-up	2.	25 October 1993	ITF Jurmala, Latvia	Hard (i)	(Poland) Aleksandra Olsza	(Ukraine) Natalia Bondarenko (Ukraine) Elena Tatarkova	6–7, 2–6
Runner-up	3.	19 May 1997	ITF Brixen, Italy	Clay	(Argentina) Luciana Masante	(Germany) Caroline Schneider (Austria) Patricia Wartusch	3–6, 0–6
Runner-up	4.	1 June 1998	ITF Tashkent, Uzbekistan	Hard	(Paraguay) Larissa Schaerer	(United States) Melissa Mazzotta (Colombia) Fabiola Zuluaga	2–6, 1–6
