= Anca Barna =

German tennis player

- Country (sports): Germany
- Born: 14 May 1977 (age 49) Cluj, SR Romania
- Height: 1.75 m (5 ft 9 in)
- Turned pro: 1991
- Retired: 2005
- Plays: Left-handed (two-handed backhand)
- Prize money: $746,387

Singles
- Career record: 331–304
- Career titles: 2 ITF
- Highest ranking: No. 46 (12 April 2004)

Grand Slam singles results
- Australian Open: 3R (2003)
- French Open: 1R (2001, 2002, 2003, 2004)
- Wimbledon: 2R (2001)
- US Open: 2R (2002, 2003)

Doubles
- Career record: 75–135
- Career titles: 2 ITF
- Highest ranking: 119 (21 April 1997)

Grand Slam doubles results
- Australian Open: 1R (2002)
- French Open: 1R (1997)
- Wimbledon: Q2 (1999)

Anca Barna (born 14 May 1977) is a former German tennis player. She turned professional in 1992 and retired in 2005. On 12 April 2004, Barna reached her highest singles ranking, world No. 46. Her highest doubles ranking came on 21 April 1997, when she peaked at No. 119. Anca resides in Nuremberg, Germany. Her sister, Adriana Barna, was also a professional tennis player.

== WTA career finals ==
=== Singles: 1 runner-up ===
Legend
Grand Slam tournaments
Tier I (0-0)
Tier II (0-0)
Tier III (0-0)
Tier IV & V (0-1)

Result	W-L	Date	Tournament	Surface	Opponent	Score
Loss	0–1	Apr 2002	Portugal Open	Clay	(Spain) Magüi Serna	4–6, 2–6

== ITF Circuit finals ==
$100,000 tournaments
$75,000 tournaments
$50,000 tournaments
$25,000 tournaments
$10,000 tournaments

=== Singles: 6 (2–4) ===
Result	No.	Date	Tournament	Surface	Opponent	Score
Loss	1.	1 November 1993	ITF Vilamoura, Portugal	Hard	(Italy) Rita Grande	0–6, 2–6
Loss	2.	12 June 1994	ITF Caserta, Italy	Clay	(Spain) Neus Ávila Bonastre	1–6, 2–6
Win	3.	2 August 1998	ITF Les Contamines, France	Hard	(Bulgaria) Lubomira Bacheva	7–6, 6–1
Loss	4.	20 September 1998	ITF Otočec, Slovenia	Clay	(Croatia) Jelena Kostanić Tošić	4–6, 6–7
Loss	5.	20 December 1998	ITF Průhonice, Czech Republic	Carpet (i)	(Czech Republic) Alena Vašková	4–6, 3–6
Win	6.	5 November 2000	ITF Hayward, United States	Hard	(United States) Dawn Buth	5–3, 4–2, 5–3

=== Doubles: 6 (2–4) ===
Result	No.	Date	Tournament	Surface	Partner	Opponents	Score
Loss	1.	21 September 1992	ITF Cluj, Romania	Clay	(Germany) Adriana Barna	(Czech Republic) Martina Hautová (Germany) Susi Lohrmann	4–6, 1–6
Win	2.	15 July 1996	ITF Darmstadt, Germany	Clay	(Germany) Adriana Barna	(Czech Republic) Lenka Cenková (Czech Republic) Pavlína Rajzlová	4–6, 6–3, 6–3
Win	3.	23 September 1996	ITF Bucharest, Romania	Clay	(Germany) Adriana Barna	(Hungary) Virág Csurgó (Russia) Julia Lutrova	4–6, 6–1, 6–0
Loss	4.	9 December 1996	ITF Salzburg, Austria	Carpet (i)	(Germany) Adriana Barna	(Croatia) Mirjana Lučić-Baroni (United States) Chanda Rubin	3–6, 2–6
Loss	5.	9 December 1998	ITF Titisee-Neustadt, Germany	Carpet (i)	(Germany) Adriana Barna	(Czech Republic) Květa Peschke (Czech Republic) Helena Vildová	4–6, 3–6
Loss	6.	29 November 1999	ITF Cergy-Pontoise, France	Hard (i)	(Germany) Adriana Barna	(Germany) Jasmin Wöhr (Denmark) Eva Dyrberg	6–2, 2–6, 4–6

== Head-to-head record ==
- Dominique Monami 0-1
- Monica Seles 0-1
- Serena Williams 0-2
- Venus Williams 0-1
- Anastasia Myskina 0-1
- Kim Clijsters 0-2
- Nadia Petrova 1-1
- Elena Dementieva 1-1
- Justine Henin 0-3
- Jelena Janković 0-1
