= Adam Peterson (tennis) =

American tennis player

- Full name: Adam Peterson
- Country (sports): United States
- Born: July 16, 1974 (age 52) Fullerton, California, U.S.
- Prize money: $75,519

Singles
- Career record: 0–1
- Career titles: 0
- Highest ranking: No. 355 (April 6, 1998)

Doubles
- Career record: 9–14
- Career titles: 0
- Highest ranking: No. 102 (October 4, 1999)

Grand Slam doubles results
- Australian Open: 1R (2000)
- Wimbledon: Q2 (1999)
- US Open: 2R (1999)

Adam Peterson (born July 16, 1974) is a former professional tennis player from the United States.

== Biography ==
=== Early career ===
Peterson, who grew up in Orange County, California, made the boys' doubles semi-finals at both the 1990 and 1992 US Open junior competitions.

A USC Trojans player, he was a member of NCAA title winning sides in 1993 and 1994. While still an amateur he was given a wildcard into the main draw at Indian Wells in 1995. He won the singles and doubles events at the 1996 ITA Summer Championships, formerly known as the US Amateur Championships.

=== Professional tennis ===
From 1996, he competed professionally, primarily as a doubles specialist, reaching a career best ranking of 102.

During his career he won a total of three Challenger titles, all in doubles. At a Challenger tournament in Dallas in 1998 he and partner Mitch Sprengelmeyer defeated the Bryan brothers. His most-noted singles performance on tour came at Challenger level, a win over Nicolás Massú at the Binghamton Challenger in 1999.

Peterson made semi-finals of ATP Tour tournaments at Boston and Los Angeles in 1999. At the tournament in Los Angeles, which he played beside Martin Damm, the pair overcame top seeds Leander Paes and Jonas Björkman in the quarter-finals.

At Grand Slam level, he twice played in the main draw of the men's doubles. At the 1999 US Open he and partner Jan-Michael Gambill made it to the second round, where they were beaten by the world's top-ranked doubles pair, Leander Paes and Mahesh Bhupathi. His other appearance was the 2000 Australian Open, with Michael Sell.

=== Coaching ===
Peterson retired from tennis at the end of the 2000 season and began a career in coaching. He best-known for his stints as coach of Lindsay Davenport and has also coached other top female players including Madison Keys, Samantha Stosur and Coco Vandeweghe.

Since 2012, he has been the USTA lead national coach for women's tennis.

== Challenger titles ==
=== Doubles: (3) ===
No.	Year	Tournament	Surface	Partner	Opponents	Score
1.	1995	Binghamton, U.S.	Hard	(United States) Scott Humphries	(Australia) Neil Borwick (Australia) Jamie Morgan	7–6, 6–2
2.	1998	San Diego, U.S.	Hard	(United States) Paul Goldstein	(Australia) Michael Hill (United States) Scott Humphries	6–2, 7–5
3.	1999	Grenoble, France	Hard	(United States) Chris Tontz	(Argentina) Martín García (Brazil) Cristiano Testa	4–6, 6–3, 6–4
