= Mashona Washington =

American tennis player

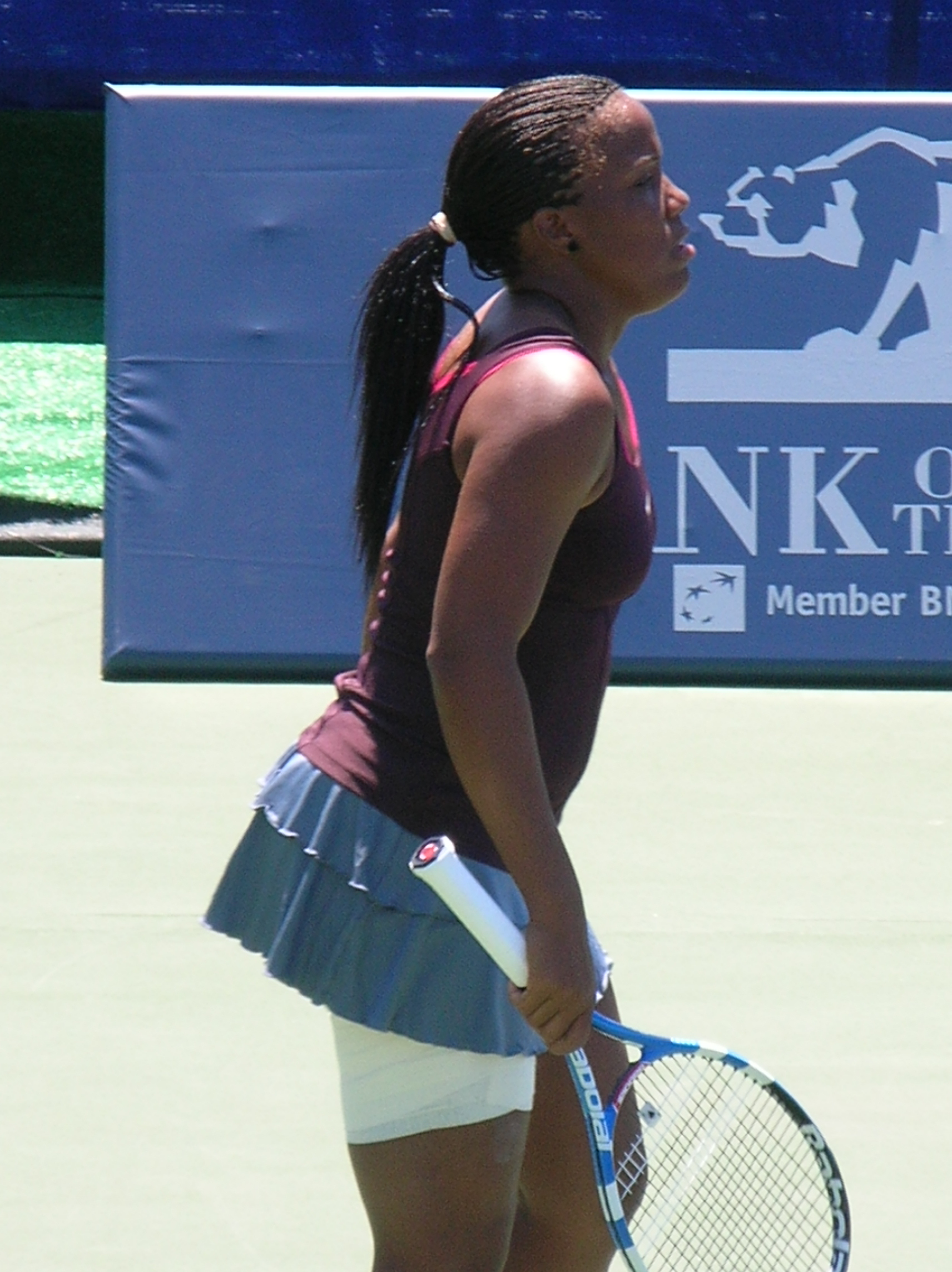
- Mashona at Stanford, 2010
- Country (sports): United States
- Residence: Houston, Texas
- Born: May 31, 1976 (age 50) Flint, Michigan
- Height: 5 ft 6 in (1.68 m)
- Turned pro: 1995
- Retired: 2012
- Plays: Right (two-handed backhand)
- Prize money: $975,863

Singles
- Career record: 373–353
- Career titles: 2 ITF
- Highest ranking: No. 50 (November 8, 2004)

Grand Slam singles results
- Australian Open: 2R (2005)
- French Open: 1R (2005, 2006)
- Wimbledon: 3R (2005)
- US Open: 2R (2002)

Doubles
- Career record: 213–207
- Career titles: 15 ITF
- Highest ranking: No. 55 (July 18, 2005)

Grand Slam doubles results
- Australian Open: 2R (2005)
- French Open: 2R (2004)
- Wimbledon: 3R (2003)
- US Open: 3R (1998, 2004)

Mashona Washington (born May 31, 1976) is a former tennis player from the United States.

Her career-high singles ranking is No. 50, achieved on November 8, 2004. On July 18, 2005, she peaked at No. 55 in the doubles rankings. Washington retired from professional tennis in 2012, aged 36.

== Biography ==
Washington attended high school in Michigan, moved to Delray Beach, Florida in her sophomore year, graduating from Lake Worth Christian School, Boynton Beach, Florida in 1994, and moved to Houston, Texas, in 1997.

She is the younger sister of Mashiska and of MaliVai Washington, who reached the men's singles final at Wimbledon in 1996.

=== Tennis career ===
As a junior player, Washington won the U.S. Indoor National 18s in 1992, and was a finalist at the U.S. National Hardcourt 16s and U.S. Indoor National 16s in 1991. She turned professional in 1995.

After a slow start to her professional career, Washington's breakthrough year came in 2004 when she broke into the world's top 100 for the first time and then finished the year ranked in the top 50. She recorded her first win against a top-10 player when she defeated Maria Sharapova at New Haven, and reached her first top-level singles final in Tokyo where she lost to Sharapova.

She also came within a hair's breadth of beating Sharapova in the first round of the 2006 French Open. She served for the match at 5–2 but could not hold serve. At 5–4 in the third set, she held match points before the then world No. 4 broke back and won the final set 7–5.

In 2005, she reached the third round at Wimbledon, before Elena Dementieva beat her 7–5, 6–1.

She was a member of the Washington Kastles World TeamTennis squad from 2008–09 and the Boston Lobsters from 2010-12.

Mashona Washington has since retired.

== WTA Tour finals ==
=== Singles: 1 (runner-up) ===
Result	Date	Championship	Surface	Opponent	Score
Loss	Oct 2004	Japan Open	Hard	(Russia) Maria Sharapova	0–6, 1–6

=== Doubles: 2 (runner-ups) ===
Result	Date	Championship	Surface	Partner	Opponents	Score
Loss	Oct 2004	Japan Open	Hard	(United States) Jennifer Hopkins	(Japan) Shinobu Asagoe (Slovenia) Katarina Srebotnik	1–6, 4–6
Loss	Feb 2008	U.S. National Indoors	Hard	(United States) Angela Haynes	(United States) Lindsay Davenport (United States) Lisa Raymond	3–6, 1–6

== ITF Circuit finals ==
Legend
$75,000 tournaments
$50,000 tournaments
$25,000 tournaments
$10,000 tournaments

=== Singles (2–10) ===
Result	No.	Date	Tournament	Surface	Opponent	Score
Loss	1.	July 4, 1994	ITF Indianapolis, United States	Hard	(Puerto Rico) Kristina Brandi	1–6, 3–6
Loss	2.	June 24, 1995	ITF Hilton Head, US	Hard	(United States) Kori Davidson	1–6, 4–6
Loss	3.	January 11, 1998	ITF San Antonio, US	Hard	(Slovakia) Andrea Šebová	5–7, 1–6
Loss	4.	January 26, 1998	ITF Clearwater, US	Hard	(Puerto Rico) Kristina Brandi	2–6, 1–6
Loss	5.	April 15, 2001	ITF Columbus, US	Hard (i)	(France) Lea Ghirardi	4–6, 3–6
Win	1.	September 30, 2001	Albuquerque Championships, US	Hard	(United States) Marissa Irvin	7–5, 6–3
Loss	6.	December 3, 2001	ITF Columbia, US	Hard	(United States) Samantha Reeves	1–6, 0–6
Loss	7.	February 10, 2002	Midland Tennis Classic, US	Hard (i)	(China) Li Na	1–6, 2–6
Loss	8.	March 28, 2004	ITF Redding, US	Hard	(United Kingdom) Anne Keothavong	3–6, 6–2, 6–7^{(3)}
Loss	9.	May 9, 2004	ITF Raleigh, US	Clay	(United States) Marissa Irvin	3–6, 3–6
Win	2.	June 1, 2008	ITF Carson, US	Hard	(United States) Alexa Glatch	7–5, 6–4
Loss	10.	June 14, 2009	ITF El Paso, US	Hard	(Canada) Valérie Tétreault	4–6, 3–6

=== Doubles (15–11) ===
Result	No.	Date	Tournament	Surface	Partner	Opponents	Score
Win	1.	Jan 1998	ITF San Antonio, US	Hard	(South Africa) Kim Grant	(Slovakia) Andrea Šebová (Slovakia) Silvia Uricková	4–6, 7–6^{(3)}, 6–2
Loss	1.	Sep 1998	ITF Seattle, US	Hard (i)	(United States) Lilia Osterloh	(Belgium) Els Callens (South Africa) Liezel Horn	2–6, 6–3, 3–6
Win	2.	May 2000	ITF Virginia Beach, US	Clay	(United States) Dawn Buth	(Australia) Lisa McShea (South Africa) Jessica Steck	1–6, 6–3, 7–6^{(2)}
Loss	2.	Nov 2001	ITF Pittsburgh, US	Hard (i)	(United States) Karin Miller	(United States) Lilia Osterloh (United States) Katie Schlukebir	1–6, 4–6
Win	3.	Oct 2002	ITF Sedona, US	Hard	(United States) Jennifer Russell	(Venezuela) Milagros Sequera (Australia) Christina Wheeler	7–6^{(3)}, 7–5
Loss	3.	Mar 2004	ITF Orange, US	Hard	(Australia) Bryanne Stewart	(United States) Jennifer Hopkins (United States) Abigail Spears	3–6, 6–2, 0–6
Win	4.	Mar 2004	ITF Redding, US	Hard	(United States) Jennifer Hopkins	(United States) Lilia Osterloh (United States) Riza Zalameda	6–2, 6–4
Win	5.	Apr 2004	ITF Augusta, US	Hard	(Italy) Francesca Lubiani	(United States) Julie Ditty (United States) Jessica Lehnhoff	6–1, 6–3
Loss	4.	Jun 2005	Surbiton Trophy, UK	Grass	(United States) Jennifer Hopkins	(Japan) Rika Fujiwara (Japan) Saori Obata	6–4, 4–6, 2–6
Win	6.	Oct 2007	Tennis Classic of Troy, US	Hard	(United States) Angela Haynes	(Czech Republic) Eva Hrdinová (Canada) Marie-Ève Pelletier	6–4, 6–2
Loss	5.	Nov 2007	ITF La Quinta, US	Hard	(United States) Angela Haynes	(United States) Christina Fusano (United States) Ashley Harkleroad	4–6, 6–2, [9–11]
Loss	6.	Jan 2008	Waikoloa Championships, US	Hard	(United States) Angela Haynes	(Brazil) Maria Fernanda Alves (Argentina) Betina Jozami	5–7, 4–6
Loss	7.	Nov 2008	ITF San Diego, US	Hard	(United States) Angela Haynes	(United States) Christina Fusano (United States) Alexa Glatch	3–6, 2–6
Loss	8.	Jan 2009	ITF Lutz, US	Clay	(United States) Story Tweedie-Yates	(United States) Kimberly Couts (Canada) Sharon Fichman	4–6, 5–7
Win	7.	Sep 2009	ITF Albuquerque, US	Hard	(United States) Riza Zalameda	(Hungary) Melinda Czink (United States) Lindsay Lee-Waters	6–3, 6–2
Win	8.	Nov 2009	Phoenix Tennis Classic, US	Hard	(Canada) Sharon Fichman	(Canada) Marie-Ève Pelletier (Georgia (country)) Anna Tatishvili	4–6, 6–4, [10–8]
Loss	9.	Nov 2009	Toronto Challenger, Canada	Hard (i)	(Canada) Sharon Fichman	(Canada) Maureen Drake (Canada) Marianne Jodoin	3–2 ret.
Win	9.	Dec 2009	ITF Veracruz, Mexico	Hard	(Slovakia) Dominika Diesková	(United States) Hsu Chieh-yu (Russia) Nika Kukharchuk	7–5, 6–4
Win	10.	Jan 2010	ITF Plantation, US	Clay	(France) Aurélie Védy	(Argentina) Jorgelina Cravero (Argentina) María Irigoyen	6–0, 6–2
Win	11.	Jan 2010	ITF Lutz, US	Clay	(France) Aurélie Védy	(Brazil) Maria Fernanda Alves (Argentina) Florencia Molinero	6–3, 6–3
Loss	10.	Sep 2010	ITF Albuquerque, US	Hard	(United States) Abigail Spears	(United States) Lindsay Lee-Waters (United States) Megan Moulton-Levy	6–2, 3–6, [8–10]
Win	12.	Nov 2010	ITF Grapevine, US	Hard	(United States) Ahsha Rolle	(United States) Julie Ditty (South Africa) Chanelle Scheepers	5–7, 6–2, [11–9]
Win	13.	Jan 2011	ITF Plantation, US	Hard	(United States) Ahsha Rolle	(United States) Christina Fusano (United States) Yasmin Schnack	6–4, 6–2
Win	14.	Jan 2011	ITF Lutz, US	Clay	(United States) Ahsha Rolle	(Canada) Gabriela Dabrowski (Canada) Sharon Fichman	6–4, 6–4
Win	15.	Oct 2011	Las Vegas Open, US	Hard	(United States) Alexa Glatch	(United States) Varvara Lepchenko (United States) Melanie Oudin	6–4, 6–2
Loss	11.	Oct 2011	Classic of Troy, US	Hard	(United States) Varvara Lepchenko	(Russia) Elena Bovina (Russia) Valeria Savinykh	6–7^{(6)}, 3–6

== Grand Slam performance timelines ==
Key
W	F	SF	QF	#R	RR	Q#	DNQ	A	NH

(W) winner; (F) finalist; (SF) semifinalist; (QF) quarterfinalist; (#R) rounds 4, 3, 2, 1; (RR) round-robin stage; (Q#) qualification round; (DNQ) did not qualify; (A) absent; (NH) not held; (SR) strike rate (events won / competed); (W–L) win–loss record.

=== Singles ===
Tournament	1994	1995	1996	1997	1998	1999	2000	2001	2002	2003	2004	2005	2006	2007	2008	W–L
Australian Open	A	A	A	A	A	Q1	Q2	A	Q1	1R	Q3	2R	1R	A	A	1–2
French Open	A	A	A	A	A	Q1	Q2	Q1	Q1	Q1	Q2	1R	1R	A	A	0–2
Wimbledon	A	A	A	A	Q1	Q2	1R	Q2	Q1	Q1	2R	3R	2R	A	Q1	4–4
US Open	Q2	Q1	Q1	Q3	1R	1R	1R	Q1	2R	Q2	1R	1R	A	A	A	1–6

=== Doubles ===
Tournament	1995	1996	1997	1998	1999	2000	2001	2002	2003	2004	2005	2006	2007	2008	2009	W–L
Australian Open	A	A	A	A	1R	A	A	A	A	1R	2R	1R	A	A	A	1–4
French Open	A	A	A	A	A	A	A	A	A	2R	1R	1R	A	A	A	1–3
Wimbledon	A	A	A	A	1R	A	A	A	3R	1R	2R	2R	A	1R	A	4–6
US Open	A	A	A	3R	1R	A	A	A	1R	3R	1R	A	A	A	1R	4–6
