= Steven Randjelovic =

Australian tennis player

- Country (sports): Australia
- Born: 21 April 1975 (age 49)
- Turned pro: 1995
- Plays: Right-handed
- Prize money: $103,377

Singles
- Career record: 0–2
- Career titles: 0
- Highest ranking: No. 205 (18 May 1998)

Grand Slam singles results
- Australian Open: Q2 (1999)
- Wimbledon: Q2 (1996)

Doubles
- Career record: 1–2
- Career titles: 0
- Highest ranking: No. 163 (25 Oct 1999)

Grand Slam doubles results
- Australian Open: 1R (2000)
- Wimbledon: Q2 (1999)

Steven Randjelovic (born 21 April 1975) is a former professional tennis player from Australia.

== Career ==
Randjelovic appeared at his only ATP International Series event in 1998, when he competed in the main draw of both the singles and doubles at Newport's Hall of Fame Tennis Championships. He was beaten by Grant Stafford in the opening round but made the quarter-finals of the doubles, partnering Lorenzo Manta.

In 1999 he played in the Austrian Open but was unable to progress past the first round, losing to Andrei Cherkasov. He won two Challenger doubles titles that year.

He and doubles partner Ashley Fisher were given a wildcard entry into the 2000 Australian Open. They lost their opening round match to 11th seeds, Jiří Novák and David Rikl.

== Challenger titles ==
=== Singles: (1) ===
No.	Year	Tournament	Surface	Opponent	Score
1.	1997	Budapest, Hungary	Clay	(Spain) Quino Muñoz	4–6, 6–3, 6–0

=== Doubles: (3) ===
No.	Year	Tournament	Surface	Partner	Opponents	Score
1.	1999	Ostend, Belgium	Clay	(South Africa) Marcos Ondruska	(Belgium) Xavier Malisse (Belgium) Wim Neefs	6–2, 6–4
2.	1999	Skopje, Macedonia	Clay	(Hungary) Gergely Kisgyörgy	(Argentina) Federico Browne (Croatia) Lovro Zovko	6–1, 5–7, 7–6^{(8–6)}
3.	2001	Lugano, Switzerland	Clay	(Hungary) Attila Sávolt	(Netherlands) Bobbie Altelaar (South Africa) Shaun Rudman	6–2, 7–6^{(7–4)}
