= 1999 Stockholm Open – Singles =

Singles
- 1999 Stockholm Open

Final
- Champion: (Sweden) Thomas Enqvist
- Runner-up: (Sweden) Magnus Gustafsson
- Score: 6–3, 6–4, 6–2

Details
- Draw: 32 (3WC/4Q)
- Seeds: 8

Events
Singles	Doubles
← 1998 ·	Stockholm Open	· 2000 →

Todd Martin was the defending champion, but did not participate this year.

Thomas Enqvist won the tournament, beating Magnus Gustafsson in the final, 6–3, 6–4, 6–2. Enqvist became the first swedish player on winning this tournament a total of 3 times, after also winning in 1995 and 1996.

== Seeds ==
1. (Sweden) Thomas Enqvist (champion)
2. (United Kingdom) Tim Henman (second round)
3. (Ecuador) Nicolás Lapentti (quarterfinals)
4. (Germany) Tommy Haas (second round)
5. (France) Cédric Pioline (first round)
6. (Sweden) Magnus Norman (semifinals)
7. (Australia) Mark Philippoussis (quarterfinals)
8. (Slovakia) Dominik Hrbatý (first round)

== Draw ==
=== Key ===
- Q = Qualifier
- WC = Wild card
- LL = Lucky loser
- Alt = Alternate
- SE = Special exempt
- PR = Protected ranking
- ITF = ITF entry
- JE = Junior exempt
- w/o = Walkover
- r = Retired
- d = Defaulted
- SR = Special ranking

=== Finals ===
Semifinals
1	(Sweden) Thomas Enqvist	6	6
6	(Sweden) Magnus Norman	3	4
(Sweden) Magnus Gustafsson	6	2	7^{7}
(United States) Jan-Michael Gambill	0	6	6^{4}

Final
1	(Sweden) Thomas Enqvist	6	6	6
(Sweden) Magnus Gustafsson	3	4	2

=== Top half ===
First round
1	(Sweden) T Enqvist	6	6
(Spain) F Vicente	0	1
(Germany) J Knippschild	6	6
(Sweden) M Larsson	4	4
(Italy) G Pozzi	6^{4}	6	7
WC	(Sweden) N Kulti	7^{7}	0	5
WC	(Sweden) A Vinciguerra	6	3	6
8	(Slovakia) D Hrbatý	4	6	3
3	(Ecuador) N Lapentti	6	7^{7}
(Netherlands) P Wessels	4	6^{5}
Q	(Belgium) F Dewulf	6	6
(Germany) R Schüttler	4	3
(South Africa) W Ferreira	7^{7}	6
Q	(Finland) V Liukko	6^{3}	3
WC	(Sweden) M Tillström	5	4
6	(Sweden) M Norman	7	6

Second round
1	(Sweden) T Enqvist	6	6
(Germany) J Knippschild	2	1
(Italy) G Pozzi	3	3
WC	(Sweden) A Vinciguerra	6	6
3	(Ecuador) N Lapentti	5	6	6
Q	(Belgium) F Dewulf	7	3	3
(South Africa) W Ferreira	5	2
6	(Sweden) M Norman	7	6

Quarterfinals
1	(Sweden) T Enqvist	6	6^{6}	6
WC	(Sweden) A Vinciguerra	2	7^{8}	4
3	(Ecuador) N Lapentti	1	4
6	(Sweden) M Norman	6	6

Semifinals
1	(Sweden) T Enqvist	6	6
6	(Sweden) M Norman	3	4

=== Bottom half ===
First round
5	(France) C Pioline	6	2	3
(Sweden) J Björkman	1	6	6
Q	(Sweden) R Lindstedt	1	1
Q	(Switzerland) G Bastl	6	6
(Spain) JC Ferrero	3	1
(Sweden) M Gustafsson	6	6
(Spain) F Clavet	5	6	4
4	(Germany) T Haas	7	3	6
7	(Australia) M Philippoussis	7^{7}	4	6
(United States) M Chang	6^{3}	6	1
(Italy) L Tieleman	1	1
(Sweden) T Johansson	6	6
(France) A Di Pasquale	2	3
(United States) J-M Gambill	6	6
(Austria) S Koubek	1	3
2	(United Kingdom) T Henman	6	6

Second round
(Sweden) J Björkman	6	6
Q	(Switzerland) G Bastl	4	4
(Sweden) M Gustafsson	6	7^{9}
4	(Germany) T Haas	3	6^{7}
7	(Australia) M Philippoussis	5	6	7^{7}
(Sweden) T Johansson	7	3	6^{1}
(United States) J-M Gambill	7	6
2	(United Kingdom) T Henman	5	3

Quarterfinals
(Sweden) J Björkman	4	6	5
(Sweden) M Gustafsson	6	0	7
7	(Australia) M Philippoussis	6	2	5
(United States) J-M Gambill	4	6	7

Semifinals
(Sweden) M Gustafsson	6	2	7^{7}
(United States) J-M Gambill	0	6	6^{4}

== Qualifying ==
=== Qualifying seeds ===
1. (Switzerland) Roger Federer (second round)
2. (Switzerland) George Bastl (qualified)
3. (Switzerland) Lorenzo Manta (second round)
4. (Sweden) Fredrik Jonsson (qualifying competition)
5. (Germany) Alexander Popp (first round)
6. (Finland) Ville Liukko (qualified)
7. (Zimbabwe) Wayne Black (first round)
8. (Germany) Michael Kohlmann (second round)

=== Qualifiers ===
1. (Belgium) Filip Dewulf
2. (Switzerland) George Bastl
3. (Sweden) Robert Lindstedt
4. (Finland) Ville Liukko

=== Qualifying draw ===
==== First qualifier ====
First round
1	(Switzerland) Roger Federer	6	7
(Italy) Cristiano Caratti	3	5
WC	(Sweden) Robin Söderling	1	3
(Sweden) Marcus Sarstrand	6	6
(Australia) Sandon Stolle	5	6
(Belgium) Filip Dewulf	7	7
(Finland) Jarkko Nieminen	4	6
8	(Germany) Michael Kohlmann	6	7

Second round
1	(Switzerland) Roger Federer	2	6	6
(Sweden) Marcus Sarstrand	6	4	7
(Belgium) Filip Dewulf	6	6
8	(Germany) Michael Kohlmann	4	2

Qualifying competition
(Sweden) Marcus Sarstrand	2	3
(Belgium) Filip Dewulf	6	6

==== Second qualifier ====
First round
2	(Switzerland) George Bastl	6	7
WC	(Sweden) Joachim Johansson	1	5
(Sweden) Nicklas Timfjord	6	6
(Austria) Julian Knowle	4	2
(Sweden) Johan Örtegren	6	7
WC	(Sweden) Mattias Pennonen	4	5
(Netherlands) Martin Verkerk	6	6
7	(Zimbabwe) Wayne Black	2	1

Second round
2	(Switzerland) George Bastl	6	6
(Sweden) Nicklas Timfjord	3	2
(Sweden) Johan Örtegren	6	3	5
(Netherlands) Martin Verkerk	2	6	7

Qualifying competition
2	(Switzerland) George Bastl	7	6
(Netherlands) Martin Verkerk	6	3

==== Third qualifier ====
First round
3	(Switzerland) Lorenzo Manta	7	6
(Sweden) Jan Hermansson	5	3
(United States) Scott Humphries	1	5
(Sweden) Robert Lindstedt	6	7
(Israel) Harel Levy	6	3	6
(Zimbabwe) Kevin Ullyett	4	6	7
(Denmark) Kristian Pless	2	6	6
5	(Germany) Alexander Popp	6	2	1

Second round
3	(Switzerland) Lorenzo Manta	4	4
(Sweden) Robert Lindstedt	6	6
(Zimbabwe) Kevin Ullyett	6	3	6
(Denmark) Kristian Pless	3	6	3

Qualifying competition
(Sweden) Robert Lindstedt	5	6	6
(Zimbabwe) Kevin Ullyett	7	3	3

==== Fourth qualifier ====
First round
4	(Sweden) Fredrik Jonsson	6	6
(Denmark) Frederik Fetterlein	4	2
(Sweden) Björn Rehnquist	6	6
(Sweden) Jonas Fröberg	4	4
(United States) Richey Reneberg	6	6	6
(Germany) Christian Vinck	4	7	1
(France) Jérôme Hanquez	3	2
6	(Finland) Ville Liukko	6	6

Second round
4	(Sweden) Fredrik Jonsson	2	6	6
(Sweden) Björn Rehnquist	6	3	3
(United States) Richey Reneberg	4	6	4
6	(Finland) Ville Liukko	6	1	6

Qualifying competition
4	(Sweden) Fredrik Jonsson	6	6	3
6	(Finland) Ville Liukko	7	3	6
