= 2001 If Stockholm Open – Doubles =

Doubles
- 2001 If Stockholm Open

Final
- Champions: (United States) Donald Johnson (United States) Jared Palmer
- Runners-up: (Sweden) Jonas Björkman (Australia) Todd Woodbridge
- Score: 6–3, 4–6, 6–3

Events
Singles	Doubles
← 2000 ·	If Stockholm Open	· 2002 →

Mark Knowles and Daniel Nestor were the defending champions but only Knowles competed that year with Brian MacPhie.

Knowles and MacPhie lost in the first round to Jonas Björkman and Todd Woodbridge.

Donald Johnson and Jared Palmer won in the final 6–3, 4–6, 6–3 against Björkman and Woodbridge.

== Seeds ==
1. (Sweden) Jonas Björkman / (Australia) Todd Woodbridge (final)
2. (United States) Donald Johnson / (United States) Jared Palmer (champions)
3. (Zimbabwe) Wayne Black / (Zimbabwe) Kevin Ullyett (quarterfinals)
4. (Netherlands) Sjeng Schalken / (Australia) Sandon Stolle (quarterfinals)

== Draw ==
=== Key ===
- Q = Qualifier
- WC = Wild card
- LL = Lucky loser
- Alt = Alternate
- SE = Special exempt
- PR = Protected ranking
- ITF = ITF entry
- JE = Junior exempt
- w/o = Walkover
- r = Retired
- d = Defaulted
- SR = Special ranking

First round
1	(Sweden) J Björkman (Australia) T Woodbridge	7	6
(The Bahamas) M Knowles (United States) B MacPhie	5	4
(Germany) K Braasch (Australia) A Florent	7^{7}	5	7^{7}
(Australia) P Hanley (Australia) N Healey	6^{5}	7	6^{2}
3	(Zimbabwe) W Black (Zimbabwe) K Ullyett	7	6^{5}	6
WC	(South Africa) W Ferreira (Australia) M Philippoussis	5	7^{7}	4
(Australia) W Arthurs (Australia) J Eagle	6	5	3
(United States) B Bryan (United States) M Bryan	2	7	6
(Paraguay) R Delgado (South Africa) N Godwin	6^{2}	7	6^{2}
WC	(Sweden) T Enqvist (Sweden) T Johansson	7^{7}	5	7^{7}
WC	(Sweden) J Fröberg (Sweden) R Söderling	1	4
4	(Netherlands) S Schalken (Australia) S Stolle	6	6
(Sweden) S Aspelin (Sweden) P Nyborg	6	6
WC	(Sweden) J Landsberg (Sweden) A Vinciguerra	3	4
(South Africa) C Haggard (Belgium) T Vanhoudt	1	7	6^{3}
2	(United States) D Johnson (United States) J Palmer	6	5	7^{7}

Quarterfinals
1	(Sweden) J Björkman (Australia) T Woodbridge	7	6
(Germany) K Braasch (Australia) A Florent	5	3
3	(Zimbabwe) W Black (Zimbabwe) K Ullyett	7	5	1
(United States) B Bryan (United States) M Bryan	5	7	6
WC	(Sweden) T Enqvist (Sweden) T Johansson	6^{1}	7^{7}	6
4	(Netherlands) S Schalken (Australia) S Stolle	7^{7}	6^{5}	4
(Sweden) S Aspelin (Sweden) P Nyborg	3	6	3
2	(United States) D Johnson (United States) J Palmer	6	1	6

Semifinals
1	(Sweden) J Björkman (Australia) T Woodbridge	6	6
(United States) B Bryan (United States) M Bryan	3	4
WC	(Sweden) T Enqvist (Sweden) T Johansson
2	(United States) D Johnson (United States) J Palmer	w/o

Final
1	(Sweden) J Björkman (Australia) T Woodbridge	3	6	3
2	(United States) D Johnson (United States) J Palmer	6	4	6
