= 2000 Scania Stockholm Open – Singles =

Singles
- 2000 Stockholm Open

Final
- Champion: (Sweden) Thomas Johansson
- Runner-up: (Russia) Yevgeny Kafelnikov
- Score: 6–2, 6–4, 6–4

Details
- Draw: 32
- Seeds: 8

Events
Singles	Doubles
← 1999 ·	Stockholm Open	· 2001 →

Thomas Enqvist was the defending champion, but lost in the first round this year.

Thomas Johansson won the tournament, beating Yevgeny Kafelnikov in the final, 6–2, 6–4, 6–4.

== Seeds ==
1. (Sweden) Magnus Norman (semifinals)
2. (Russia) Yevgeny Kafelnikov (final)
3. (Sweden) Thomas Enqvist (first round)
4. (Spain) Juan Carlos Ferrero (first round)
5. (Australia) Mark Philippoussis (withdrew)
6. (France) Sébastien Grosjean (semifinals, withdrew due to a family emergency)
7. (Switzerland) Roger Federer (second round)
8. (Netherlands) Sjeng Schalken (quarterfinals)

== Draw ==
=== Key ===
- Q = Qualifier
- WC = Wild card
- LL = Lucky loser
- Alt = Alternate
- SE = Special exempt
- PR = Protected ranking
- ITF = ITF entry
- JE = Junior exempt
- w/o = Walkover
- r = Retired
- d = Defaulted
- SR = Special ranking

=== Finals ===
Semifinals
1	(Sweden) Magnus Norman	6^{4}	2
(Sweden) Thomas Johansson	7^{7}	6
6	(France) Sébastien Grosjean
2	(Russia) Yevgeny Kafelnikov	w/o

Final
(Sweden) Thomas Johansson	6	6	6
2	(Russia) Yevgeny Kafelnikov	2	4	4

=== Top half ===
First round
1	(Sweden) M Norman	6	6
(Norway) C Ruud	1	2
(Belarus) M Mirnyi	5	3
(United States) J-M Gambill	7	6
(Zimbabwe) K Ullyett	2	5
(Australia) A Ilie	6	7
(Israel) H Levy	5	4
8	(Netherlands) S Schalken	7	6
3	(Sweden) T Enqvist	2	2
(Sweden) T Johansson	6	6
Q	(Czech Republic) L Friedl	5	4
(Germany) C Vinck	7	6
WC	(Sweden) J Johansson	4	5
(Czech Republic) B Ulihrach	6	7
(Sweden) J Björkman	6	5	6
LL	(Finland) J Nieminen	4	7	3

Second round
1	(Sweden) M Norman	w/o
(United States) J-M Gambill
(Australia) A Ilie	6	4	5
8	(Netherlands) S Schalken	4	6	7
(Sweden) T Johansson	6	6
(Germany) C Vinck	4	2
(Czech Republic) B Ulihrach	4	2
(Sweden) J Björkman	6	6

Quarterfinals
1	(Sweden) M Norman	6^{2}	7	7^{7}
8	(Netherlands) S Schalken	7^{7}	5	6^{4}
(Sweden) T Johansson	6^{6}	7^{9}	7
(Sweden) J Björkman	7^{8}	6^{7}	5

Semifinals
1	(Sweden) M Norman	6^{4}	2
(Sweden) T Johansson	7^{7}	6

=== Bottom half ===
First round
6	(France) S Grosjean	6	6
(Canada) D Nestor	4	4
Q	(Sweden) J Örtegren	6	2	7
Q	(Sweden) F Jonsson	2	6	5
(Germany) J Knippschild	3	6^{3}
(Germany) R Schüttler	6	7^{7}
(Romania) A Voinea	6^{5}	6	6
4	(Spain) JC Ferrero	7^{7}	2	3
7	(Switzerland) R Federer	5	6	6
(Russia) M Youzhny	7	4	3
(Sweden) A Vinciguerra	4	6	6
Q	(Sweden) M Sarstrand	6	3	1
WC	(Sweden) J Fröberg	3	6	6
(Zimbabwe) B Black	6	3	4
(Switzerland) G Bastl	2	2
2	(Russia) Y Kafelnikov	6	6

Second round
6	(France) S Grosjean	6	6
Q	(Sweden) J Örtegren	1	2
(Germany) R Schüttler	4	6	6
(Romania) A Voinea	6	1	2
7	(Switzerland) R Federer	5	6^{3}
(Sweden) A Vinciguerra	7	7^{7}
WC	(Sweden) J Fröberg	4	2
2	(Russia) Y Kafelnikov	6	6

Quarterfinals
6	(France) S Grosjean	6	5	7^{7}
(Germany) R Schüttler	1	7	6^{3}
(Sweden) A Vinciguerra	3	4
2	(Russia) Y Kafelnikov	6	6

Semifinals
6	(France) S Grosjean
2	(Russia) Y Kafelnikov	w/o
