= Jan Hájek (tennis) =

Czech tennis player (born 1983)

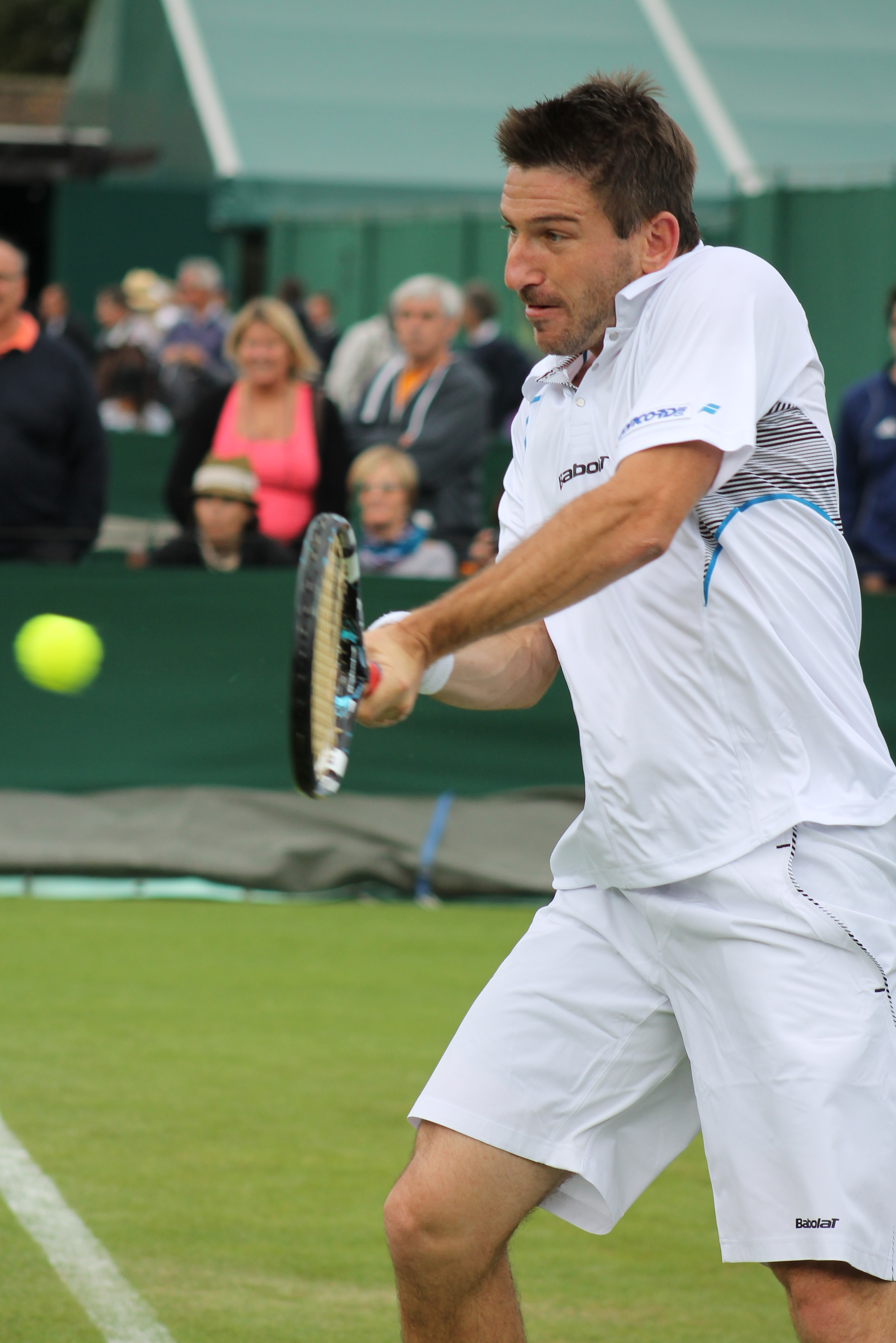
- Hájek at the 2013 Wimbledon Championships
- Country (sports): Czech Republic
- Residence: Olomouc
- Born: 7 August 1983 (age 42) Olomouc, Czechoslovakia
- Height: 1.80 m (5 ft 11 in)
- Turned pro: 2000
- Retired: 2015
- Plays: Right-handed (two-handed backhand)
- Prize money: US$ 1,427,267

Singles
- Career record: 36–77
- Career titles: 0
- Highest ranking: No. 71 (6 November 2006)

Grand Slam singles results
- Australian Open: 2R (2010)
- French Open: 3R (2007)
- Wimbledon: 1R (2007, 2010, 2013)
- US Open: 2R (2006)

Doubles
- Career record: 14–25
- Career titles: 1
- Highest ranking: No. 189 (1 May 2006)

Grand Slam doubles results
- Australian Open: 2R (2011)
- French Open: 1R (2007, 2010, 2013)
- Wimbledon: 1R (2010, 2013)
- US Open: 1R (2006, 2010, 2012)

Team competitions
- Davis Cup: W (2013)
- Last updated on: 27 August 2014.

Jan Hájek (born 7 August 1983) is a retired male professional tennis player from the Czech Republic. He reached the third round of the 2007 French Open and attained a career-high ATP singles ranking of World No. 71 in November 2006.

== Career ==
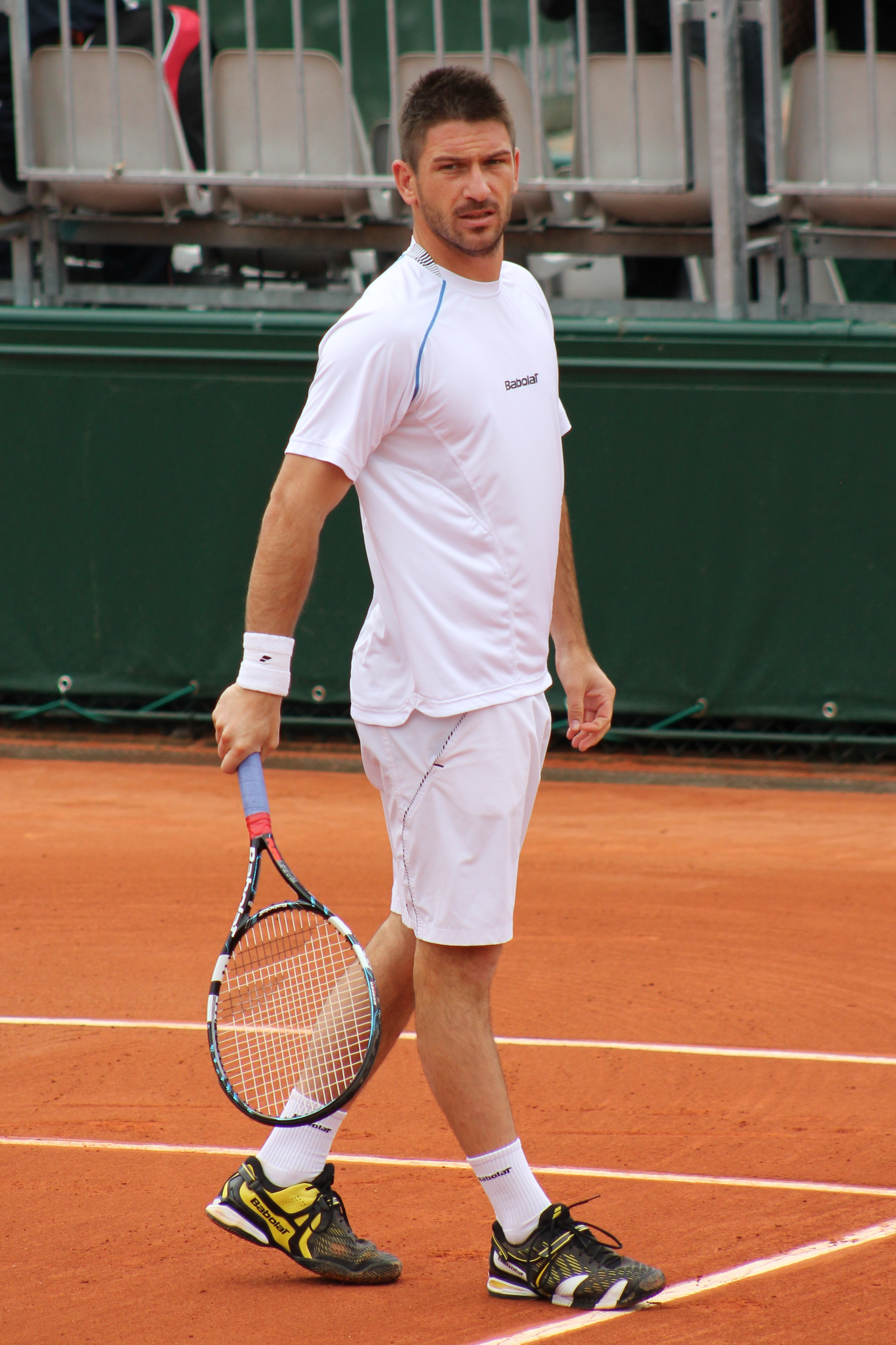
Hajek, 2013

Hájek turned professional in 2000 and won his first Futures event in Negril of the same year defeating Johan Örtegren in the final. Between 2000 and 2003 Hájek played primarily on the Futures circuit, then after that he played some Challenger events as well as the Futures tournaments. At the end of 2005 he had won 8 Futures titles all on clay, which is his best surface.

2006 was the breakthrough season for Hájek, as he started the year ranked at 352 and then finished the season ranked at 76th in the world. Hájek won his first challenger in Barletta as a qualifier easily defeating Stefano Galvani 6–2, 6–1 in the final. In May Hájek qualified for the challenger in Prague before losing to compatriot Robin Vik in the final. Hájek won three more Challengers during the year including two major ones in Prostějov where he got a retirement victory over Tomáš Berdych and Braunschweig defeated Fernando Vicente in straight sets. He won the Poznań Challenger without losing a set. In addition to the three Challenger titles, Hájek made his debut at Grand Slam level where he defeated Lukáš Dlouhý in straight sets before losing to Fernando González.

Hájek was unable to follow up the previously successful year in 2007, but he achieved his best result at Grand Slam level, where he made the third round at Roland Garros where he defeated Thomas Johansson and Bohdan Ulihrach before retiring against Marcos Baghdatis with a shoulder injury. Since then Hájek has had injury problems with the shoulder and problems with his heart.

At the beginning of 2009 Hájek started the year ranked at 474 and has been playing on the Challenger circuit and he has been playing qualifications and after qualifying for the main draw in Athens he lost in the semi-finals to Rui Machado. Hájek won the Ostrava Challenger after qualifying defeating Ivan Dodig 7–5, 6–1. He repeated his 2006 victory in Prostějov this time as a qualifier defeating Belgian Steve Darcis in the final and former top 10 player Ivan Ljubičić in the quarter-finals. Hájek won his third challenger of the year in Freudenstadt defeating Laurent Recouderc in the final. He also made his debut in the Czech Davis Cup team in the semi-final tie against Croatia where he defeated Roko Karanušić and also played in the final losing to Rafael Nadal. Hájek has a 1–2 record in Davis Cup singles with none of these matches being a live rubber.

After ending the 2009 season ranked No. 103, Hájek made a return to the Grand Slam arena at the 2010 Australian Open, defeating Robby Ginepri before losing to Mikhail Youzhny. He also reached his first quarter-final on the ATP tour at Munich losing to Youzhny again. Hájek became the first man to win the Prostějov Challenger three times after Radek Štěpánek had to retire from the final due to illness.

== ATP career finals ==
=== Doubles: 2 (1–1) ===
Legend Grand Slam Tournaments (0–0) ATP World Tour Finals (0–0) ATP World Tour Masters 1000 (0–0) ATP World Tour 500 Series (0–0) ATP World Tour 250 Series (1–1)	Titles by surface Hard (1/0) Clay (0/1) Grass (0/0) Carpet (0/0)

Outcome	No.	Date	Tournament	Surface	Partnering	Opponent in the final	Score
Runner-up	1.	30 April 2007	BMW Open, Munich, Germany	Clay	(Czech Republic) Jaroslav Levinský	(Germany) Philipp Kohlschreiber (Russia) Mikhail Youzhny	1–6, 4–6
Winner	1.	3 January 2014	Qatar ExxonMobil Open, Doha, Qatar	Hard	(Czech Republic) Tomáš Berdych	(Austria) Alexander Peya (Brazil) Bruno Soares	6–2, 6–4

== Singles titles ==
Legend (singles)
Grand Slam (0)
Tennis Masters Cup (0)
ATP Masters Series (0)
ATP Tour (0)
Challengers (9)
Futures (9)

No.	Date	Tournament	Surface	Opponent	Score
1.	23 October 2000	Negril	Clay	(Sweden) Johan Örtegren	6–3, 6–1
2.	16 June 2001	Spišská Nová Ves	Clay	(Slovakia) Juraj Hasko	6–4, 6–7^{(2–7)}, 7–5
3.	10 June 2002	Sopot	Clay	(Poland) Mariusz Fyrstenberg	6–3, 1–6, 6–2
4.	15 July 2002	Nové Zámky	Clay	(Slovakia) Ladislav Švarc	6–1, 6–2
5.	12 August 2002	Poprad	Clay	(Czech Republic) David Novak	6–1, 6–4
6.	6 January 2003	Cala Ratjada	Clay	(Spain) Mariano Albert-Ferrando	4–2, RET
7.	23 May 2005	Jablonec nad Nisou	Clay	(Czech Republic) Tomas Jecminek	6–4, 6–2
8.	31 October 2005	Frýdlant nad Ostravicí	Indoor Hard	(Slovakia) Lukáš Lacko	1–6, 7–5, 6–4
9.	23 March 2006	Barletta	Clay	(Italy) Stefano Galvani	6–2, 6–1
10.	5 June 2006	Prostějov	Clay	(Slovakia) Dominik Hrbatý	6–3, 5–7, 6–2
11.	19 June 2006	Braunschweig	Clay	(Spain) Fernando Vicente	6–1, 6–3
12.	10 July 2006	Poznań	Clay	(Serbia) Ilija Bozoljac	6–4, 6–3
13.	29 September 2008	Porto	Clay	(Czech Republic) Dušan Lojda	6–0, 7–6^{(7–2)}
14.	27 April 2009	Ostrava	Clay	(Croatia) Ivan Dodig	7–5, 6–1
15.	1 June 2009	Prostějov	Clay	(Belgium) Steve Darcis	6–2, 1–6, 6–4
16.	31 October 2009	Freudenstadt	Clay	(France) Laurent Recouderc	2–6, 6–3, 7–6^{(7–5)}
17.	31 May 2010	Prostějov	Clay	(Czech Republic) Radek Štěpánek	6–0 RET
18.	1 July 2012	Marburg	Clay	(Austria) Andreas Haider-Maurer	6–2, 6–2

== Grand Slam performance timelines ==
Key
W	F	SF	QF	#R	RR	Q#	DNQ	A	NH

(W) winner; (F) finalist; (SF) semifinalist; (QF) quarterfinalist; (#R) rounds 4, 3, 2, 1; (RR) round-robin stage; (Q#) qualification round; (DNQ) did not qualify; (A) absent; (NH) not held; (SR) strike rate (events won / competed); (W–L) win–loss record.

=== Singles ===
Tournament	2006	2007	2008	2009	2010	2011	2012	2013	2014	SR	W–L
Australian Open	A	1R	A	A	2R	1R	Q1	1R	1R	0 / 5	1–5
French Open	A	3R	A	A	1R	1R	Q3	2R		0 / 4	2–4
Wimbledon	A	1R	A	A	1R	A	A	1R		0 / 3	0–3
US Open	2R	A	A	A	1R	A	1R			0 / 3	1–3
Win–loss	1–1	2–3	0–0	0–0	1–4	0–2	0–1	1–3	0–1	0 / 15	4–15
Year End Ranking	76	240	479	103	95	141	105	108			

=== Doubles ===
Tournament	2006	2007	2008	2009	2010	2011	2012	2013	SR	W–L
Australian Open						2R			0 / 1	1–1
French Open		1R			1R			1R	0 / 2	0–2
Wimbledon					1R			1R	0 / 2	0–2
US Open	1R				1R		1R		0 / 3	0–3
Win–loss	0–1	0–1	0–0	0–0	0–3	1–1	0–1	0–2	0 / 9	1–9
