= Shortest tennis match records =

This article covers records concerning the shortest-ever tennis matches both in terms of number of games and duration in terms of time. Matches affected by a retirement or default are not listed.

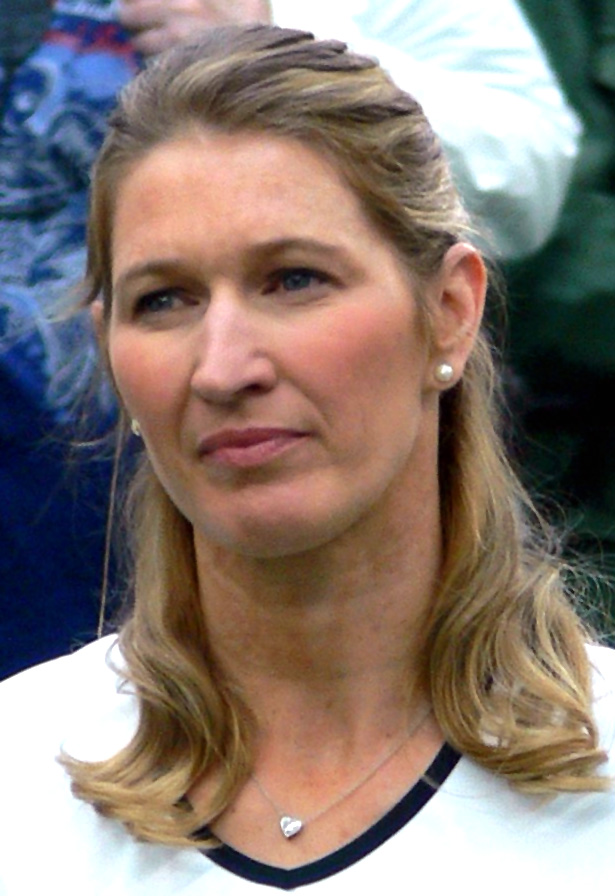
Steffi Graf won the quickest-ever Open Era Grand Slam Final in 32 minutes.

== Short times ==
=== Men ===
==== Overall ====
- Jack Harper lost just one point when he defeated J. Sandiford 6–0, 6–0 at the 1946 Surrey Open Hard Court Championships in a match that lasted 18 minutes, the shortest men's singles match on record.
- Francisco Clavet set an ATP tournament record in Shanghai in the first round of the 2001 Heineken Open Shanghai when he defeated Jiang Shan (Li Na's husband) in 25 minutes, 6–0, 6–0.

==== Grand Slam tournaments ====
===== Wimbledon =====
- The 1881 Wimbledon final in which William Renshaw defeated John Hartley, 6–0, 6–1, 6–1, lasted 36 minutes.
- Fred Perry defeated Gottfried von Cramm, 6–1, 6–1, 6–0, in the 1936 Wimbledon final in 40 minutes.
- Roger Federer defeated Alejandro Falla in the second round in the 2004 Wimbledon Championships 6-1, 6-2, 6-0 in 54 minutes.
- Goran Ivanisevic defeated David Nainkin in the first round in the 1996 Wimbledon Championships 6–2, 6–0, 6–2 in 55 minutes.
- Jo-Wilfried Tsonga defeated Bernard Tomic in the first round in the 2019 Wimbledon Championships 6–2, 6–1, 6–4 in 58 minutes, though Tomic was later fined for a lack of effort.

===== Masters Tour =====
- Jarkko Nieminen won against Bernard Tomic at the Miami Masters in 2014 in 28 minutes, 6–0, 6–1.

==== Olympics ====
- John Millman became the first male in Olympic tennis history to win a match by the score of 6–0, 6–0 when he defeated Ričardas Berankis in the first round of the tennis tournament at the 2016 Summer Olympics. There have been several Olympic men's singles matches with a score of 6–0, 6–0, 6–1.

=== Women ===
==== Overall ====
- Margaret Court won the 1963 Eastern Grass Court Championships crown in a record 24-minute match against Darlene Hard, 6–1, 6–1.
- Helen Wills defeated Joan Fry at the 1927 Wightman Cup 6–2, 6–0 in 24 minutes.
- Helen Wills, while dispatching Emily Wright 6–0, 6–0 in Beaulieu, France in 1926, won the first set in 9 minutes.

==== Grand Slam tournaments ====
===== French Open =====
- Steffi Graf won 6–0, 6–0, against Natasha Zvereva in the 1988 French Open final. The official time of the match given on the scoresheet was 34 minutes, but the match consumed just 32 minutes of playing time, split into two periods of nine and 23 minutes because of a rain break. It was the first of two "double bagel" Grand Slam singles finals of the Open Era (the other one being Iga Swiatek beating Amanda Anisimova at Wimbledon 2025), and only the third time in the history of tennis (the other being at 1911 Wimbledon).

===== Wimbledon =====
- During the 1969 tournament, Sue Tutt beat Marion Boundy 6–2, 6–0 in 20 minutes.
- In the 1922 Wimbledon final Suzanne Lenglen defeated Molla Mallory, 6–2, 6–0, in 23 minutes. Some accounts state that the match was over in 20 minutes.
- In the 1925 Wimbledon final Lenglen defeated Joan Fry in 25 minutes, 6–2, 6–0.

===== US Open =====
- In the 1964 US Open final Maria Bueno defeated Caldwell Graebner, by 6–1, 6–0, in 25 minutes, though her own recollection was 19 minutes.

== Fewest games ==
Key
W	F	SF	QF	#R	RR	Q#	P#	DNQ	A	Z#	PO	G	S	B	NMS	NTI	P	NH

(W) winner; (F) finalist; (SF) semifinalist; (QF) quarterfinalist; (#R) rounds 4, 3, 2, 1; (RR) round-robin stage; (Q#) qualification round; (P#) preliminary round; (DNQ) did not qualify; (A) absent; (Z#) Davis/Fed Cup Zonal Group (with number indication) or (PO) play-off; (G) gold, (S) silver or (B) bronze Olympic/Paralympic medal; (NMS) not a Masters tournament; (NTI) not a Tier I tournament; (P) postponed; (NH) not held; (SR) strike rate (events won / competed); (W–L) win–loss record.
‡ Winner of the match also won the tournament.
† Both matches played on 4 March 2016, one in Finland and the other in Ecuador.

=== Men (triple bagel) ===
There have been at least 18 best-of-five-set matches which have lasted 18 games (6–0, 6–0, 6–0), colloquially referred to as a "triple bagel", in the Open Era. This is the shortest possible length for a best-of-five-set match, not including retirements or defaults.

Year	Event	Round	Winner	Loser
1968	French Open	1R	(Socialist Federal Republic of Yugoslavia) Nikola Špear	(France) Daniel Contet
1968	Canadian Open	R64	(Canada) John Sharpe	(Canada) Denis Galesi
1969	Perth	R64	(Australia) Trevor Baker	(Australia) P. Eckert
1969	Bastad	R32	(Colombia) William Alvarez	(Norway) Nils Elvik
1971	Melbourne	R32	(Australia) John Fraser	(Australia) Roland Russo
1972	Johannesburg	R32	(South Africa) Peter Tudhope	(South Africa) Morris Shongwe
1973	Davis Cup	Z1	(Indonesia) Gondo Widjojo	(Hong Kong) Tao Po
1981	Davis Cup	PO	(France) Thierry Tulasne	(Japan) Shinichi Sakamoto
1984	Davis Cup	1R	(Spain) Emilio Sánchez	(Algeria) Kamel Harrad
1987	French Open	2R	(Czechoslovakia) Karel Nováček	(Argentina) Eduardo Bengoechea
1987	Wimbledon	1R	(Sweden) Stefan Edberg	(Sweden) Stefan Eriksson
1987	US Open	1R	(Czechoslovakia) Ivan Lendl^{‡}	(South Africa) Barry Moir
1989	Davis Cup	3R	(Pakistan) Hamed-ul-Haq	(Bangladesh) Faisal Rahman
1991	Davis Cup	1R	(Hong Kong) Michael Walker	(Singapore) Dishan Herath
1993	French Open	2R	(Spain) Sergi Bruguera^{‡}	(France) Thierry Champion
1998	Davis Cup	2R	(Japan) Gouichi Motomura	(New Zealand) Teo Susnjak
1999	Davis Cup	PO	(Chinese Taipei) Lin Bing-Chao	(Qatar) Nasser Al-Khelaifi
2001	Wimbledon	Q3	(Australia) Todd Woodbridge	(Sweden) Johan Örtegren
2005	Davis Cup	2R	(Brazil) Ricardo Mello	(Netherlands Antilles) David Josepa
2009	Davis Cup	PO	(Portugal) Rui Machado	(Algeria) Valentin Rahine
2011	Davis Cup	2R	(United Kingdom) Andy Murray	(Luxembourg) Laurent Bram
2016	Davis Cup†	1R	(Finland) Jarkko Nieminen	(Zimbabwe) Courtney John Lock
2016	Davis Cup†	1R	(Ecuador) Emilio Gómez	(Barbados) Adam Hornby

=== Women (double bagel) ===
In women's tennis, matches featuring a minimum number of games are a more frequent occurrence. The following are women's Grand Slam singles matches which have lasted 12 games (6–0, 6–0), colloquially referred to as a "double bagel", in the Open Era. This is the shortest possible length for a best-of-three-set match, not including retirements or defaults.

==== Women's singles ====
Year	Grand Slam	Round	Winner	Loser
1969	Australian Open	1R	(Australia) Margaret Court^{‡}	(Australia) Judith Gohl
1969	French Open	1R	(Japan) Kazuko Sawamatsu	(Belgium) Monique Van Haver
1969	French Open	3R	(United States) Julie Heldman	(Argentina) Raquel Giscafré
1969	Wimbledon	3R	(Australia) Karen Krantzcke	(United States) Pam Teeguarden
1970	Australian Open	2R	(Australia) Margaret Court^{‡}	(Australia) Caroline Langsford
1970	French Open	1R	(West Germany) Helga Hösl	(Hungary) Katalin Borka
1970	French Open	3R	(United States) Billie Jean King	(France) Odile de Roubin
1970	Wimbledon	2R	(United States) Peggy Michel	(Czechoslovakia) Alena Palmeova
1970	Wimbledon	2R	(Australia) Judy Dalton	(United Kingdom) Sue Northen
1971	Australian Open	1R	(Australia) Patricia Coleman	(Australia) Helen Taylor
1971	French Open	1R	(United States) Julie Heldman	(South Africa) Sharon Van Brandis
1971	Wimbledon	1R	(United States) Rosie Casals	(France) Rosy Darmon
1971	Wimbledon	2R	(Australia) Margaret Court	(Australia) Lorraine Robinson
1972	French Open	1R	(Czechoslovakia) Vlasta Vopičková	(Belgium) Michele Gurdal
1972	US Open	2R	(Australia) Margaret Court	(Australia) Barbara Hawcroft
1973	Australian Open	2R	(Australia) Margaret Court^{‡}	(France) Nathalie Fuchs
1974	Australian Open	1R	(Australia) Wendy Turnbull	(Australia) Brenda Dale
1974	Australian Open	2R	(United States) Chris Evert	(Hungary) Katerleen Szeman
1974	Australian Open	2R	(Australia) Evonne Goolagong^{‡}	(Japan) Masako Yokobori
1974	French Open	1R	(Czechoslovakia) Marie Neumannová	(France) Nicole Bimes
1974	Wimbledon	1R	(United Kingdom) Virginia Wade	(United Kingdom) Veronica Burton
1974	Wimbledon	2R	(United Kingdom) Winnie Shaw	(Australia) Nerida Gregory
1974	Wimbledon	2R	(United States) Mona Schallau	(France) Nathalie Fuchs
1974	US Open	3R	(Australia) Evonne Goolagong	(West Germany) Katja Ebbinghaus
1975	French Open	2R	(Soviet Union) Marina Kroschina	(United States) Laurie Fleming
1975	Wimbledon	3R	(Australia) Margaret Court	(Czechoslovakia) Renáta Tomanová
1975	US Open	3R	(Australia) Evonne Goolagong	(United States) Peggy Michel
1984	Wimbledon	1R	(United States) Zina Garrison	(United Kingdom) Rina Einy
1984	US Open	3R	(United States) Martina Navratilova	(South Africa) Jennifer Mundel
1985	Australian Open	1R	(Australia) Wendy Turnbull	(Australia) Susan Leo
1985	Australian Open	2R	(Australia) Wendy Turnbull	(Australia) Elizabeth Smylie
1986	Wimbledon	1R	(United States) Pamela Casale	(Austria) Petra Huber
1987	Wimbledon	4R	(Czechoslovakia) Helena Suková	(Italy) Rafaella Reggi
1987	Wimbledon	2R	(West Germany) Steffi Graf	(Denmark) Tine Scheuer-Larsen
1988	French Open	F	(West Germany) Steffi Graf^{‡}	(Soviet Union) Natasha Zvereva
1988	Wimbledon	1R	(West Germany) Steffi Graf^{‡}	(United States) Na Hu
1988	Wimbledon	3R	(Bulgaria) Katerina Maleeva	(New Zealand) Belinda Cordwell
1989	Australian Open	1R	(Spain) Conchita Martínez	(Czechoslovakia) Eva Švíglerová
1989	Australian Open	2R	(West Germany) Steffi Graf	(Canada) Rene Simpson
1989	Wimbledon	1R	(Australia) Anne Minter	(United States) Molly Van Nostrand
1990	US Open	2R	(Socialist Federal Republic of Yugoslavia) Monica Seles	(France) Elena Pampoulova
1991	US Open	2R	(West Germany) Steffi Graf	(France) Catherine Mothes-Jobkel
1991	Australian Open	1R	(Socialist Federal Republic of Yugoslavia) Monica Seles^{‡}	(West Germany) Sabine Hack
1992	Wimbledon	2R	(Germany) Barbara Rittner	(West Germany) Silke Frankl
1992	US Open	2R	(South Africa) Amanda Coetzer	(France) Nathalie Tauziat
1993	Wimbledon	1R	(Germany) Steffi Graf^{‡}	(Australia) Kirrily Sharpe
1993	Wimbledon	3R	(Germany) Steffi Graf^{‡}	(Canada) Helen Kelesi
1993	French Open	2R	(Spain) Arantxa Sánchez Vicario	(Japan) Naoko Sawamatsu
1994	French Open	3R	(France) Mary Pierce	(United States) Lori McNeil
1994	Wimbledon	1R	(Australia) Kristine Radford	(Mexico) Angélica Gavaldón
1995	French Open	1R	(Spain) Conchita Martínez	(Germany) Sabine Hack
1996	French Open	3R	(Spain) Arantxa Sánchez Vicario	(Russia) Elena Likhovtseva
1996	Wimbledon	1R	(Spain) Conchita Martínez	(Italy) Silvia Farina Elia
1996	Wimbledon	1R	(United States) Mary Joe Fernández	(West Germany) Jana Kandarr
1996	Wimbledon	2R	(Belgium) Dominique Van Roost	(Japan) Yone Kamio
1997	Wimbledon	2R	(Spain) Conchita Martínez	(Japan) Yuka Yoshida
1997	Wimbledon	1R	(Spain) Arantxa Sánchez Vicario	(United Kingdom) Clare Wood
1998	Australian Open	1R	(France) Mary Pierce	(China) Li Fang
1998	Australian Open	2R	(Spain) Arantxa Sánchez Vicario	(Russia) Elena Makarova
1998	Australian Open	4R	(United States) Lindsay Davenport	(Romania) Ruxandra Dragomir
1998	Australian Open	4R	(Switzerland) Martina Hingis^{‡}	(Indonesia) Yayuk Basuki
1998	Australian Open	4R	(France) Mary Pierce	(Slovakia) Henrieta Nagyová
1998	US Open	2R	(Belgium) Dominique Van Roost	(Poland) Magdalena Grzybowska
1999	French Open	2R	(Israel) Anna Smashnova	(Belgium) Els Callens
1999	Wimbledon	2R	(United States) Monica Seles	(West Germany) Marlene Weingärtner
1999	US Open	2R	(Spain) Conchita Martínez	(France) Alexia Dechaume-Balleret
2000	Australian Open	1R	(Russia) Anna Kournikova	(Austria) Patricia Wartusch
2000	French Open	1R	(Spain) Ángeles Montolio	(Austria) Patricia Wartusch
2000	US Open	1R	(Belgium) Kim Clijsters	(Spain) Marta Marrero
2001	Australian Open	1R	(Croatia) Silvija Talaja	(Australia) Alicia Molik
2001	French Open	1R	(Federal Republic of Yugoslavia) Jelena Dokić	(Czech Republic) Adriana Gerši
2002	Wimbledon	1R	(United States) Monica Seles	(Spain) Eva Bes
2002	US Open	1R	(United States) Venus Williams	(Croatia) Mirjana Lučić
2002	US Open	1R	(Uzbekistan) Iroda Tulyaganova	(Italy) Adriana Serra Zanetti
2003	Australian Open	2R	(Belgium) Kim Clijsters	(Hungary) Petra Mandula
2003	French Open	3R	(United States) Serena Williams	(Austria) Barbara Schett
2003	Wimbledon	1R	(Belgium) Kim Clijsters	(Paraguay) Rossana de los Ríos
2003	Wimbledon	1R	(France) Mary Pierce	(United States) Ansley Cargill
2004	Australian Open	1R	(Belgium) Justine Henin	(Australia) Olivia Lukaszewicz
2004	Australian Open	2R	(Belgium) Kim Clijsters	(Italy) Maria Elena Camerin
2005	Wimbledon	1R	(United States) Lindsay Davenport	(United States) Jamea Jackson
2006	Wimbledon	1R	(France) Amélie Mauresmo^{‡}	(Croatia) Ivana Abramović
2007	Australian Open	1R	(Belgium) Kim Clijsters	(Russia) Vasilisa Bardina
2007	Wimbledon	1R	(Germany) Martina Müller	(Israel) Anna Smashnova
2008	French Open	2R	(Belarus) Victoria Azarenka	(Romania) Sorana Cîrstea
2008	French Open	4R	(Serbia) Ana Ivanovic^{‡}	(Czech Republic) Petra Cetkovská
2009	Australian Open	1R	(Slovakia) Dominika Cibulková	(South Africa) Chanelle Scheepers
2009	Australian Open	2R	(Russia) Vera Zvonareva	(Romania) Edina Gallovits
2009	French Open	1R	(Russia) Dinara Safina	(United Kingdom) Anne Keothavong
2009	Wimbledon	1R	(France) Marion Bartoli	(Chinese Taipei) Yung-Jan Chan
2009	Wimbledon	2R	(Belarus) Victoria Azarenka	(Romania) Ioana Raluca Olaru
2009	US Open	2R	(Italy) Flavia Pennetta	(India) Sania Mirza
2009	US Open	4R	(Ukraine) Kateryna Bondarenko	(Argentina) Gisela Dulko
2010	Australian Open	1R	(Spain) María José Martínez Sánchez	(Russia) Evgeniya Rodina
2010	US Open	Q1	(Netherlands) Arantxa Rus	(Bolivia) María Fernanda Álvarez Terán
2010	US Open	2R	(Denmark) Caroline Wozniacki	(Chinese Taipei) Chang Kai-chen
2010	US Open	3R	(Russia) Maria Sharapova	(United States) Beatrice Capra
2011	Australian Open	1R	(Belgium) Kim Clijsters^{‡}	(Russia) Dinara Safina
2011	Australian Open	1R	(France) Marion Bartoli	(Italy) Tathiana Garbin
2012	French Open	1R	(Russia) Maria Sharapova^{‡}	(Romania) Alexandra Cadanțu
2012	US Open	Q1	(Chinese Taipei) Chan Yung-jan	(Spain) Inés Ferrer Suárez
2012	US Open	4R	(United States) Serena Williams^{‡}	(Czech Republic) Andrea Hlaváčková
2013	Australian Open	1R	(United States) Serena Williams	(Romania) Edina Gallovits-Hall
2013	Australian Open	1R	(Russia) Maria Sharapova	(Russia) Olga Puchkova
2013	Australian Open	2R	(Russia) Maria Sharapova	(Japan) Misaki Doi
2013	US Open	1R	(Spain) Carla Suárez Navarro	(United States) Lauren Davis
2013	US Open	1R	(Italy) Sara Errani	(Australia) Olivia Rogowska
2013	US Open	1R	(Belarus) Victoria Azarenka	(Germany) Dinah Pfizenmaier
2013	US Open	QF	(United States) Serena Williams^{‡}	(Spain) Carla Suárez Navarro
2014	Australian Open	1R	(Germany) Annika Beck	(Croatia) Petra Martić
2014	French Open	3R	(Russia) Maria Sharapova^{‡}	(Argentina) Paula Ormaechea
2014	US Open	1R	(Sweden) Johanna Larsson	(France) Virginie Razzano
2015	Australian Open	Q1	(Czech Republic) Barbora Krejčíková	(Peru) Bianca Botto
2015	Wimbledon	1R	(United States) Venus Williams	(United States) Madison Brengle
2015	Wimbledon	1R	(Germany) Andrea Petkovic	(United States) Shelby Rogers
2015	Wimbledon	1R	(Germany) Angelique Kerber	(Germany) Carina Witthöft
2016	Australian Open	1R	(Belarus) Victoria Azarenka	(Belgium) Alison Van Uytvanck
2016	French Open	1R	(China) Wang Qiang	(France) Tessah Andrianjafitrimo
2016	US Open	1R	(Spain) Carla Suárez Navarro	(Brazil) Teliana Pereira
2017	French Open	2R	(Denmark) Caroline Wozniacki	(Canada) Françoise Abanda
2018	US Open	1R	(Australia) Daria Gavrilova	(Spain) Sara Sorribes Tormo
2018	US Open	1R	(Puerto Rico) Monica Puig	(Switzerland) Stefanie Vögele
2018	US Open	3R	(Japan) Naomi Osaka^{‡}	(Belarus) Aliaksandra Sasnovich
2019	Australian Open	1R	(Russia) Maria Sharapova	(United Kingdom) Harriet Dart
2021	Australian Open	1R	(Australia) Ashleigh Barty	(Montenegro) Danka Kovinić
2022	US Open	1R	(Brazil) Beatriz Haddad Maia	(Croatia) Ana Konjuh
2023	French Open	3R	(Poland) Iga Świątek^{‡}	(China) Wang Xinyu
2024	Australian Open	3R	(Belarus) Aryna Sabalenka^{‡}	(Ukraine) Lesia Tsurenko
2024	French Open	4R	(Poland) Iga Świątek^{‡}	Anastasia Potapova
2024	Wimbledon	2R	Daria Kasatkina	(United Kingdom) Lily Miyazaki
2025	Australian Open	Q1	(China) Gao Xinyu	(Netherlands) Anouk Koevermans
2025	French Open	Q1	(Canada) Bianca Andreescu	(China) Yao Xinxin
2025	French Open	Q1	(Australia) Astra Sharma	(United States) Emina Bektas
2025	French Open	1R	Victoria Azarenka	(Belgium) Yanina Wickmayer
2025	Wimbledon	1R	(United States) Amanda Anisimova	(Kazakhstan) Yulia Putintseva
2025	Wimbledon	F	(Poland) Iga Świątek^{‡}	(United States) Amanda Anisimova

==== Women's doubles ====
Year	Grand Slam	Round	Winner	Loser
2006	US Open	1R	(Czech Republic) Květa Peschke (Italy) Francesca Schiavone	(Sweden) Sofia Arvidsson (Germany) Martina Müller
2007	Australian Open	QF	(Chinese Taipei) Chan Yung-jan (Chinese Taipei) Chuang Chia-jung	(United States) Ashley Harkleroad (Russia) Galina Voskoboeva
2009	Wimbledon	3R	(United States) Serena Williams^{‡} (United States) Venus Williams^{‡}	(China) Yan Zi (China) Zheng Jie
2017	Wimbledon	F	(Russia) Ekaterina Makarova^{‡} (Russia) Elena Vesnina^{‡}	(Chinese Taipei) Chan Hao-Ching (Romania) Monica Niculescu

== See also ==
- Longest tennis match records
- Lists of tennis records and statistics
