= 1999 Stockholm Open – Doubles =

Doubles
- 1999 Stockholm Open

Final
- Champions: (South Africa) Piet Norval (Zimbabwe) Kevin Ullyett
- Runners-up: (United States) Jan-Michael Gambill (United States) Scott Humphries
- Score: 7–5, 6–3

Details
- Draw: 16 (3WC/1Q)
- Seeds: 4

Events
Singles	Doubles
← 1998 ·	Stockholm Open	· 2000 →

Nicklas Kulti and Mikael Tillström were the defending champions, and lost in the semifinals to the runners-up.

Piet Norval and Kevin Ullyett won the title, defeating Jan-Michael Gambill and Scott Humphries 7–5, 6–3 in the final.

== Seeds ==
1. (Canada) Sébastien Lareau / (United States) Alex O'Brien (quarterfinals)
2. (Zimbabwe) Wayne Black / (Australia) Sandon Stolle (semifinals)
3. (Australia) Wayne Arthurs / (Australia) Andrew Kratzmann (first round)
4. (South Africa) Piet Norval / (Zimbabwe) Kevin Ullyett (champions)

== Draw ==
=== Key ===
- Q = Qualifier
- WC = Wild card
- LL = Lucky loser
- Alt = Alternate
- SE = Special exempt
- PR = Protected ranking
- ITF = ITF entry
- JE = Junior exempt
- w/o = Walkover
- r = Retired
- d = Defaulted
- SR = Special ranking

=== Draw ===
First round
1	(Canada) S Lareau (United States) A O'Brien	6	6
WC	(Sweden) J Björkman (Sweden) T Johansson	4	4
(Sweden) N Kulti (Sweden) M Tillström	7	7
(South Africa) C Haggard (Sweden) P Nyborg	5	5
3	(Australia) W Arthurs (Australia) A Kratzmann	7	2	6^{5}
(United States) J-M Gambill (United States) S Humphries	5	6	7^{7}
(United States) R Reneberg (Czech Republic) C Suk	3	6^{5}
WC	(Sweden) T Enqvist (Sweden) M Larsson	6	7^{7}
(United States) M Keil (Germany) M Kohlmann	3	3
Q	(Switzerland) G Bastl (United States) A Peterson	6	6
(South Africa) W Ferreira (South Africa) B Haygarth	6^{3}	6^{6}
4	(South Africa) P Norval (Zimbabwe) K Ullyett	7^{7}	7^{8}
(Italy) M Bertolini (United States) D Bowen	0	6^{2}
(India) M Bhupathi (Australia) P Tramacchi	6	7^{7}
WC	(Switzerland) R Federer (Sweden) M Norman	3	0
2	(Zimbabwe) W Black (Australia) S Stolle	6	6

Quarterfinals
1	(Canada) S Lareau (United States) A O'Brien	4	4
(Sweden) N Kulti (Sweden) M Tillström	6	6
(United States) J-M Gambill (United States) S Humphries	3	7^{7}	6
WC	(Sweden) T Enqvist (Sweden) M Larsson	6	6^{3}	1
Q	(Switzerland) G Bastl (United States) A Peterson	1	1
4	(South Africa) P Norval (Zimbabwe) K Ullyett	6	6
(India) M Bhupathi (Australia) P Tramacchi	1	3
2	(Zimbabwe) W Black (Australia) S Stolle	6	6

Semifinals
(Sweden) N Kulti (Sweden) M Tillström	3	6	6^{7}
(United States) J-M Gambill (United States) S Humphries	6	3	7^{9}
4	(South Africa) P Norval (Zimbabwe) K Ullyett	3	7^{7}	6
2	(Zimbabwe) W Black (Australia) S Stolle	6	6^{3}	4

Final
(United States) J-M Gambill (United States) S Humphries	5	3
4	(South Africa) P Norval (Zimbabwe) K Ullyett	7	6

== Qualifying ==
=== Qualifying seeds ===
1. (Slovakia) Dominik Hrbatý / (Italy) Laurence Tieleman (first round)
2. (Switzerland) George Bastl / (United States) Adam Peterson (qualified)

=== Qualifiers ===
1. (Switzerland) George Bastl / (United States) Adam Peterson

=== Qualifying draw ===
First round
1	(Slovakia) Dominik Hrbatý (Italy) Laurence Tieleman	6	6
(Sweden) Tobias Hildebrand (Sweden) Robert Lindstedt	7	7
WC	(Sweden) Joachim Johansson (Sweden) Andreas Vinciguerra	6	3	6
2	(Switzerland) George Bastl (United States) Adam Peterson	3	6	7

Qualifying competition
(Sweden) Tobias Hildebrand (Sweden) Robert Lindstedt	6	3
2	(Switzerland) George Bastl (United States) Adam Peterson	7	6
