= 2001 If Stockholm Open =

- Date: 22–28 October
- Edition: 33rd
- Category: International Series
- Draw: 32S / 16D
- Prize money: $775,000
- Location: Stockholm, Sweden
- Venue: Kungliga tennishallen

Champions

Singles
- (Netherlands) Sjeng Schalken

Doubles
- (United States) Donald Johnson / (United States) Jared Palmer
← 2000 ·	Stockholm Open	· 2002 →

The 2001 If Stockholm Open was a men's tennis tournament played on indoor hard courts at the Kungliga tennishallen in Stockholm, Sweden and was part of the International Series of the 2001 ATP Tour. It was the 33rd edition of the tournament and ran from 22 October through 28 October 2001. Sixth-seeded Sjeng Schalken won the singles title.

== Finals ==
=== Singles ===
(Netherlands) Sjeng Schalken defeated (Finland) Jarkko Nieminen 3–6, 6–3, 6–3, 4–6, 6–3

- It was Schalken's 1st singles title of the year and the 6th of his career.

=== Doubles ===
(United States) Donald Johnson / (United States) Jared Palmer defeated (Sweden) Jonas Björkman / (Australia) Todd Woodbridge 6–3, 4–6, 6–3

- It was Johnson's 7th title of the year and the 21st of his career. It was Palmer's 6th title of the year and the 23rd of his career.
