= 1998 Stockholm Open – Doubles =

Doubles
- 1998 Stockholm Open

Final
- Champions: (Sweden) Nicklas Kulti (Sweden) Mikael Tillström
- Runners-up: (South Africa) Chris Haggard (Sweden) Peter Nyborg
- Score: 7–5, 3–6, 7–5

Events
Singles	Doubles
← 1997 ·	Stockholm Open	· 1999 →

Marc-Kevin Goellner and Richey Reneberg were the defending champions, but did not participate together this year. Goellner partnered Wayne Ferreira, losing in the quarterfinals. Reneberg partnered Jonathan Stark, losing in the semifinals.

Nicklas Kulti and Mikael Tillström won the title, defeating Chris Haggard and Peter Nyborg 7–5, 3–6, 7–5 in the final.

== Seeds ==
1. (India) Mahesh Bhupathi / (India) Leander Paes (semifinals)
2. (Australia) Joshua Eagle / (Australia) Andrew Florent (quarterfinals)
3. (South Africa) David Adams / (South Africa) John-Laffnie de Jager (first round)
4. (Australia) David Macpherson / (United States) Brian MacPhie (first round)

== Draw ==
=== Key ===
- Q = Qualifier
- WC = Wild card
- LL = Lucky loser
- Alt = Alternate
- ITF = ITF entry
- PR = Protected ranking
- SR = Special ranking
- SE = Special exempt
- JE = Junior exempt
- JR = Junior Accelerator Programme entrant
- CO = College Accelerator Programme entrant
- NG = Next Gen Accelerator Program entrant
- w/o = Walkover
- r = Retired
- d = Defaulted

=== Draw ===
First round
1	(India) M Bhupathi (India) L Paes	6	6
Q	(United States) G Grant (South Africa) M Wakefield	4	4
WC	(Sweden) J Björkman (Sweden) T Enqvist	6	6	4
(South Africa) W Ferreira (Germany) M-K Goellner	7	3	6
4	(Australia) D Macpherson (United States) B MacPhie	5	7	2
(South Africa) C Haggard (Sweden) P Nyborg	7	6	6
WC	(Sweden) J Apell (Sweden) M Norman	4	7	4
(United States) M Keil (Finland) T Ketola	6	6	6
(Netherlands) T Kempers (Netherlands) M Oosting	4	6	6
(Czech Republic) P Vízner (United States) J Waite	6	4	3
(United States) R Reneberg (United States) J Stark	7	3	6
3	(South Africa) D Adams (South Africa) J-L de Jager	5	6	3
(Sweden) N Kulti (Sweden) M Tillström	4	6	6
WC	(Sweden) M Gustafsson (Sweden) T Johansson	6	1	2
(Australia) W Arthurs (Australia) P Tramacchi	6	5
2	(Australia) J Eagle (Australia) A Florent	7	7

Quarterfinals
1	(India) M Bhupathi (India) L Paes	6	6
(South Africa) W Ferreira (Germany) M-K Goellner	2	4
(South Africa) C Haggard (Sweden) P Nyborg	7	6
(United States) M Keil (Finland) T Ketola	5	4
(Netherlands) T Kempers (Netherlands) M Oosting	3	6
(United States) R Reneberg (United States) J Stark	6	7
(Sweden) N Kulti (Sweden) M Tillström	6	7
2	(Australia) J Eagle (Australia) A Florent	1	6

Semifinals
1	(India) M Bhupathi (India) L Paes	6	4	4
(South Africa) C Haggard (Sweden) P Nyborg	4	6	6
(United States) R Reneberg (United States) J Stark	4	6	0^{r}
(Sweden) N Kulti (Sweden) M Tillström	6	3	3

Final
(South Africa) C Haggard (Sweden) P Nyborg	5	6	5
(Sweden) N Kulti (Sweden) M Tillström	7	3	7
