= 1998 Stockholm Open =

- Date: 9–15 November
- Edition: 30th
- Category: International Series
- Draw: 32S / 16D
- Prize money: $800,000
- Surface: Hard / indoor
- Location: Stockholm, Sweden
- Venue: Kungliga tennishallen

Champions

Singles
- (United States) Todd Martin

Doubles
- (Sweden) Nicklas Kulti / (Sweden) Mikael Tillström
← 1997 ·	Stockholm Open	· 1999 →

The 1998 Stockholm Open was an ATP men's tennis tournament played on indoor hard courts and held at the Kungliga tennishallen in Stockholm, Sweden. It was the 30th edition of the event and part of the ATP International Series of the 1998 ATP Tour. The tournament was held from 9 November through 15 November 1998. Unseeded Todd Martin won the singles title.

== Finals ==
=== Singles ===
(United States) Todd Martin defeated (Sweden) Thomas Johansson, 6–3, 6–4, 6–4

- It was Martin's 2nd singles title of the year and the 7th of his career.

=== Doubles ===
(Sweden) Nicklas Kulti / (Sweden) Mikael Tillström defeated (South Africa) Chris Haggard / (Sweden) Peter Nyborg, 7–5, 3–6, 7–5
