= 1997 Stockholm Open =

- Date: 3–9 November
- Edition: 29th
- Category: International Series
- Draw: 32S / 16D
- Prize money: $800,000
- Surface: Hard / indoor
- Location: Stockholm, Sweden
- Venue: Kungliga tennishallen

Champions

Singles
- (Sweden) Jonas Björkman

Doubles
- (Germany) Marc-Kevin Goellner / (United States) Richey Reneberg
← 1996 ·	Stockholm Open	· 1998 →

The 1997 Stockholm Open was an ATP men's tennis tournament played on indoor hard courts and held at the Kungliga tennishallen in Stockholm, Sweden. It was the 29th edition of the event and part of the ATP International Series of the 1997 ATP Tour. The tournament was held from 3 November through 9 November 1997. Jonas Björkman won the singles title.

== Finals ==
=== Singles ===
(Sweden) Jonas Björkman defeated (Netherlands) Jan Siemerink, 3–6, 7–6^{(7–2)}, 6–2, 6–4

=== Doubles ===
(Germany) Marc-Kevin Goellner / (United States) Richey Reneberg defeated (South Africa) Ellis Ferreira / (United States) Patrick Galbraith, 6–3, 3–6, 7–6
