= 1998 Stockholm Open – Singles =

Singles
- 1998 Stockholm Open

Final
- Champion: (United States) Todd Martin
- Runner-up: (Sweden) Thomas Johansson
- Score: 6–3, 6–4, 6–4

Details
- Draw: 32
- Seeds: 8

Events
Singles	Doubles
← 1997 ·	Stockholm Open	· 1999 →

Jonas Björkman was the defending champion, but lost in the second round this year.

Todd Martin won the tournament, beating Thomas Johansson in the final, 6–3, 6–4, 6–4.

== Seeds ==
1. (United States) Pete Sampras (first round)
2. (Slovakia) Karol Kučera (first round)
3. (United Kingdom) Tim Henman (semifinals)
4. (United Kingdom) Greg Rusedski (semifinals)
5. (Sweden) Jonas Björkman (second round)
6. (France) Cédric Pioline (second round)
7. (Sweden) Thomas Johansson (final)
8. (Sweden) Thomas Enqvist (first round)

== Draw ==
=== Key ===
- Q = Qualifier
- WC = Wild card
- LL = Lucky loser
- Alt = Alternate
- ITF = ITF entry
- PR = Protected ranking
- SR = Special ranking
- SE = Special exempt
- JE = Junior exempt
- JR = Junior Accelerator Programme entrant
- CO = College Accelerator Programme entrant
- NG = Next Gen Accelerator Program entrant
- w/o = Walkover
- r = Retired
- d = Defaulted

=== Finals ===
Semifinals
7	(Sweden) Thomas Johansson	7	7^{9}
4	(United Kingdom) Greg Rusedski	5	6^{7}
3	(United Kingdom) Tim Henman	6	1	2
(United States) Todd Martin	4	6	6

Final
7	(Sweden) Thomas Johansson	3	4	4
(United States) Todd Martin	6	6	6

=== Top half ===
First round
1	(United States) P Sampras	6^{5}	6	4
(Australia) J Stoltenberg	7^{7}	4	6
(Sweden) M Norman	2	6	5
(Germany) H Dreekmann	6	2	7
(Germany) M Kohlmann	3	3
Q	(United States) G Grant	6	6
(France) F Santoro	4	6^{8}
7	(Sweden) T Johansson	6	7^{10}
4	(United Kingdom) G Rusedski	6	6
(Germany) T Haas	1	4
(India) L Paes	6^{1}	1
(United States) V Spadea	7^{7}	6
(Canada) D Nestor	6	7^{7}
(Belgium) J Van Herck	3	6^{2}
WC	(Sweden) A Vinciguerra	3	5
6	(France) C Pioline	6	7

Second round
(Australia) J Stoltenberg	6	6
(Germany) H Dreekmann	2	2
Q	(United States) G Grant	1	4
7	(Sweden) T Johansson	6	6
4	(United Kingdom) G Rusedski	6	6
(United States) V Spadea	1	4
(Canada) D Nestor	6	3	6
6	(France) C Pioline	3	6	3

Quarterfinals
(Australia) J Stoltenberg	5	5
7	(Sweden) T Johansson	7	7
4	(United Kingdom) G Rusedski	7^{7}	1	6
(Canada) D Nestor	6^{2}	6	3

Semifinals
7	(Sweden) T Johansson	7	7^{9}
4	(United Kingdom) G Rusedski	5	6^{7}

=== Bottom half ===
First round
5	(Sweden) J Björkman	6	6
(Germany) M-K Goellner	4	2
(Germany) R Schüttler	6	4	4
(Sweden) M Gustafsson	3	6	6
(South Africa) W Ferreira	6	6
(Germany) J Knippschild	4	2
(Sweden) M Tillström	3	1
3	(United Kingdom) T Henman	6	6
8	(Sweden) T Enqvist	4	6	4
Q	(Japan) T Suzuki	6	2	6
WC	(Sweden) F Jonsson	4	6^{5}
(Denmark) K Carlsen	6	7^{7}
Q	(Switzerland) I Heuberger	1	2
(United States) T Martin	6	6
Q	(Australia) W Arthurs	7^{7}	7^{7}
2	(Slovakia) K Kučera	6^{5}	6^{4}

Second round
5	(Sweden) J Björkman	0	6	1
(Sweden) M Gustafsson	6	4	6
(South Africa) W Ferreira	6^{3}	3
3	(United Kingdom) T Henman	7^{7}	6
Q	(Japan) T Suzuki	7^{10}	6
(Denmark) K Carlsen	6^{8}	4
(United States) T Martin	6	6
Q	(Australia) W Arthurs	4	3

Quarterfinals
(Sweden) M Gustafsson	3	6	6^{0}
3	(United Kingdom) T Henman	6	3	7^{7}
Q	(Japan) T Suzuki	3	4
(United States) T Martin	6	6

Semifinals
3	(United Kingdom) T Henman	6	1	2
(United States) T Martin	4	6	6
