= 1997 Stockholm Open – Singles =

Singles
- 1997 Stockholm Open

Final
- Champion: (Sweden) Jonas Björkman
- Runner-up: (Netherlands) Jan Siemerink
- Score: 3–6, 7–6^{(7–2)}, 6–2, 6–4

Details
- Draw: 32
- Seeds: 8

Events
Singles	Doubles
← 1996 ·	Stockholm Open	· 1998 →

Thomas Enqvist was the defending champion, but lost in the second round this year.

Jonas Björkman won the tournament, beating Jan Siemerink in the final, 3–6, 7–6^{(7–2)}, 6–2, 6–4.

== Seeds ==
1. (Australia) Patrick Rafter (semifinals)
2. (United Kingdom) Greg Rusedski (semifinals)
3. (Spain) Carlos Moyá (first round)
4. (Sweden) Jonas Björkman (champion)
5. (Austria) Thomas Muster (second round)
6. (Spain) Àlex Corretja (first round)
7. (Sweden) Thomas Enqvist (second round)
8. (United Kingdom) Tim Henman (quarterfinals)

== Draw ==
=== Key ===
- Q = Qualifier
- WC = Wild card
- LL = Lucky loser
- Alt = Alternate
- ITF = ITF entry
- PR = Protected ranking
- SR = Special ranking
- SE = Special exempt
- JE = Junior exempt
- JR = Junior Accelerator Programme entrant
- CO = College Accelerator Programme entrant
- NG = Next Gen Accelerator Program entrant
- w/o = Walkover
- r = Retired
- d = Defaulted

=== Finals ===
Semifinals
1	(Australia) Patrick Rafter	6^{3}	6^{3}
4	(Sweden) Jonas Björkman	7^{7}	7^{7}
(Netherlands) Jan Siemerink	4	7^{7}	6
2	(United Kingdom) Greg Rusedski	6	6^{5}	4

Final
4	(Sweden) Jonas Björkman	3	7^{7}	6	6
(Netherlands) Jan Siemerink	6	6^{2}	2	4

=== Top half ===
First round
1	(Australia) P Rafter	6	6
(Sweden) M Tillström	3	0
WC	(Sweden) H Holm	3	7^{9}	3
(Belgium) J Van Herck	6	6^{7}	6
(South Africa) M Ondruska	2	2
(Sweden) M Gustafsson	6	6
Q	(United States) D Wheaton	6	1	6^{8}
8	(United Kingdom) T Henman	1	6	7^{10}
4	(Sweden) J Björkman	6	5
(Germany) M-K Goellner	4	2^{r}
(Belgium) F Dewulf	2	5
(Sweden) T Johansson	6	7
(Slovakia) K Kučera	6	6
(France) G Raoux	4	3
(Norway) C Ruud	3	1
5	(Austria) T Muster	6	6

Second round
1	(Australia) P Rafter	6	6
(Belgium) J Van Herck	3	4
(Sweden) M Gustafsson	3	6	4
8	(United Kingdom) T Henman	6	2	6
4	(Sweden) J Björkman	6	7
(Sweden) T Johansson	4	5
(Slovakia) K Kučera	4	6	6
5	(Austria) T Muster	6	3	3

Quarterfinals
1	(Australia) P Rafter	6	6
8	(United Kingdom) T Henman	3	3
4	(Sweden) J Björkman	6	6
(Slovakia) K Kučera	3	2

Semifinals
1	(Australia) P Rafter	6^{3}	6^{3}
4	(Sweden) J Björkman	7^{7}	7^{7}

=== Bottom half ===
First round
6	(Spain) À Corretja	6	4	4
Q	(Australia) M Tebbutt	4	6	6
(United States) R Reneberg	4	4
(France) C Pioline	6	6
Q	(Sweden) F Bergh	6	1	3
(Netherlands) J Siemerink	3	6	6
(Germany) B Becker	6	6
3	(Spain) C Moyá	4	3
7	(Sweden) T Enqvist	7	6
(Sweden) M Norman	5	3
Q	(Sweden) F Jonsson	5	5
(Sweden) M Larsson	7	7
(France) L Roux	6	6
(Spain) A Berasategui	2	1
WC	(Sweden) N Kulti	6^{3}	4
2	(United Kingdom) G Rusedski	7^{7}	6

Second round
Q	(Australia) M Tebbutt	3	7^{7}	4
(France) C Pioline	6	6^{4}	6
(Netherlands) J Siemerink	7^{8}	6^{3}	6
(Germany) B Becker	6^{6}	7^{7}	3
7	(Sweden) T Enqvist	1	2
(Sweden) M Larsson	6	6
(France) L Roux	4	6^{5}
2	(United Kingdom) G Rusedski	6	7^{7}

Quarterfinals
(France) C Pioline	4	2
(Netherlands) J Siemerink	6	6
(Sweden) M Larsson
2	(United Kingdom) G Rusedski	w/o

Semifinals
(Netherlands) J Siemerink	4	7^{7}	6
2	(United Kingdom) G Rusedski	6	6^{5}	4
