= Sue Tutt =

British tennis player

- Full name: Susan Tutt
- Country (sports): Great Britain
- Born: 1943 (age 81–82)

Singles

Grand Slam singles results
- Wimbledon: 2R (1969, 1970)

Doubles

Grand Slam doubles results
- Wimbledon: 1R (1967)

Susan Tutt (born 1943) is a British former professional tennis player. She competed as Sue Northen after marriage.

Tutt, a native of Leicester, was active on tour in the 1960s and 1970s. Her first round win over Marion Boundy at the 1969 Wimbledon Championships (6–2, 6–0) lasted only 20 minutes and is considered to be one of the shortest tennis matches on record. The following year she was at the other end of a heavy defeat at Wimbledon when she fell 0–6, 0–6 to Judy Dalton in the second round.
