= 2000 Scania Stockholm Open =

2000 Stockholm Open
- Date: 20–26 November
- Edition: 32nd
- Category: International Series
- Draw: 32S / 16D
- Prize money: $775,000
- Surface: Hard
- Location: Stockholm, Sweden
- Venue: Kungliga tennishallen

Champions

Singles
- (Sweden) Thomas Johansson

Doubles
- (The Bahamas) Mark Knowles / (Canada) Daniel Nestor
← 1999 ·	Stockholm Open	· 2001 →

The 2000 Stockholm Open was an ATP men's tennis tournament played on hard courts, and held at the Kungliga tennishallen in Stockholm, Sweden. It was the 32nd edition of the event and part of the ATP International Series of the 2000 ATP Tour. The tournament was held from 20 November through 26 November 2000. Unseeded Thomas Johansson won the singles title.

== Finals ==
=== Singles ===
(Sweden) Thomas Johansson defeated (Russia) Yevgeny Kafelnikov, 6–2, 6–4, 6–4

- It was Johansson's 1st singles title of the year and the 4th of his career.

=== Doubles ===
(The Bahamas) Mark Knowles / (Canada) Daniel Nestor defeated (Czech Republic) Petr Pála / (Czech Republic) Pavel Vízner, 6–3, 6–2
