= 1999 Stockholm Open =

- Date: 8–14 November
- Edition: 31st
- Category: World Series
- Draw: 32S / 16D
- Prize money: $800,000
- Surface: Hard / indoor
- Location: Stockholm, Sweden
- Venue: Kungliga tennishallen

Champions

Singles
- (Sweden) Thomas Enqvist

Doubles
- (South Africa) Piet Norval / (Zimbabwe) Kevin Ullyett
← 1998 ·	Stockholm Open	· 2000 →

The 1999 Stockholm Open was an ATP men's tennis tournament played on hard courts and held at the Kungliga tennishallen in Stockholm, Sweden. It was the 31st edition of the event and part of the ATP World Series of the 1999 ATP Tour. The tournament was held from 8 November until 14 November 1999. First-seeded Thomas Enqvist won the singles title.

== Finals ==
=== Singles ===
(Sweden) Thomas Enqvist defeated (Sweden) Magnus Gustafsson, 6–3, 6–4, 6–2

=== Doubles ===
(South Africa) Piet Norval / (Zimbabwe) Kevin Ullyett defeated (United States) Jan-Michael Gambill / (United States) Scott Humphries, 7–5, 6–3
