= 1997 Stockholm Open – Doubles =

Doubles
- 1997 Stockholm Open

Final
- Champions: (Germany) Marc-Kevin Goellner (United States) Richey Reneberg
- Runners-up: (South Africa) Ellis Ferreira (United States) Patrick Galbraith
- Score: 6–3, 3–6, 7–6

Details
- Draw: 16
- Seeds: 4

Events
Singles	Doubles
- Stockholm Open

Patrick Galbraith and Jonathan Stark were the defending champions, but Stark did not participate this year. Galbraith partnered Ellis Ferreira, losing in the final.

Marc-Kevin Goellner and Richey Reneberg won the title, defeating Ferreira and Galbraith 6–3, 3–6, 7–6 in the final.

== Seeds ==
1. (South Africa) Ellis Ferreira / (United States) Patrick Galbraith (final)
2. (Sweden) Jonas Björkman / (Sweden) Nicklas Kulti (semifinals)
3. (Australia) Joshua Eagle / (Australia) Patrick Rafter (semifinals)
4. (Czech Republic) Pavel Vízner / (Netherlands) Fernon Wibier (first round)

== Draw ==
Key

- Q = Qualifier
- WC = Wild card
- LL = Lucky loser
- Alt = Alternate
- ITF = ITF entry
- PR = Protected ranking
- SR = Special ranking
- SE = Special exempt
- JE = Junior exempt
- JR = Junior Accelerator Programme entrant
- CO = College Accelerator Programme entrant
- NG = Next Gen Accelerator Program entrant
- w/o = Walkover
- r = Retired
- d = Defaulted

=== Draw ===
First round
1	(South Africa) E Ferreira (United States) P Galbraith	6	6
(Spain) T Carbonell (Spain) F Roig	4	3
(Netherlands) S Groen (United States) D Wheaton	6	5
(United States) D Randall (United States) J Waite	7	7
3	(Australia) J Eagle (Australia) P Rafter	6	6
(Belgium) L Pimek (South Africa) B Talbot	3	2
WC	(Sweden) P Fredriksson (Sweden) M Norman	2	7	1
(Netherlands) T Kempers (Netherlands) M Oosting	6	6	6
Q	(Germany) M-K Goellner (United States) R Reneberg	7	6
(United States) T Kronemann (Australia) D Macpherson	6	4
(Netherlands) S Noteboom (Belgium) T Vanhoudt	7	6	7
4	(Czech Republic) P Vízner (Netherlands) F Wibier	6	7	6
WC	(Sweden) M Larsson (Sweden) P Nyborg	3	7	6
WC	(Sweden) J Apell (Sweden) M Tillström	6	6	4
(South Africa) M Ondruska (Australia) M Tebbutt	2	2
2	(Sweden) J Björkman (Sweden) N Kulti	6	6

Quarterfinals
1	(South Africa) E Ferreira (United States) P Galbraith	4	6	6
(United States) D Randall (United States) J Waite	6	4	3
3	(Australia) J Eagle (Australia) P Rafter	7	6
(Netherlands) T Kempers (Netherlands) M Oosting	6	2
Q	(Germany) M-K Goellner (United States) R Reneberg	7	6
(Netherlands) S Noteboom (Belgium) T Vanhoudt	6	4
WC	(Sweden) M Larsson (Sweden) P Nyborg	6	3	2
2	(Sweden) J Björkman (Sweden) N Kulti	3	6	6

Semifinals
1	(South Africa) E Ferreira (United States) P Galbraith	7	5	7
3	(Australia) J Eagle (Australia) P Rafter	6	7	6
Q	(Germany) M-K Goellner (United States) R Reneberg	5	6	6
2	(Sweden) J Björkman (Sweden) N Kulti	7	4	3

Final
1	(South Africa) E Ferreira (United States) P Galbraith	3	6	6
Q	(Germany) M-K Goellner (United States) R Reneberg	6	3	7
