= 2000 Scania Stockholm Open – Doubles =

Doubles
- 2000 Stockholm Open

Final
- Champions: (The Bahamas) Mark Knowles (Canada) Daniel Nestor
- Runners-up: (Czech Republic) Petr Pála (Czech Republic) Pavel Vízner
- Score: 6–3, 6–2

Details
- Draw: 16
- Seeds: 4

Events
| Singles | Doubles |
- Stockholm Open

Piet Norval and Kevin Ullyett were the defending champions, but lost in the semifinals this year.

Mark Knowles and Daniel Nestor won the title, defeating Petr Pála and Pavel Vízner 6–3, 6–2 in the final.

== Seeds ==
1. (Sweden) Nicklas Kulti / (United States) Jared Palmer (first round)
2. (Sweden) Jonas Björkman / (Belarus) Max Mirnyi (quarterfinals)
3. (South Africa) Piet Norval / (Zimbabwe) Kevin Ullyett (semifinals)
4. (Czech Republic) David Rikl / (Czech Republic) Cyril Suk (first round)

== Draw ==
Key

- Q = Qualifier
- WC = Wild card
- LL = Lucky loser
- Alt = Alternate
- ITF = ITF entry
- PR = Protected ranking
- SR = Special ranking
- SE = Special exempt
- JE = Junior exempt
- JR = Junior Accelerator Programme entrant
- CO = College Accelerator Programme entrant
- NG = Next Gen Accelerator Program entrant
- w/o = Walkover
- r = Retired
- d = Defaulted

=== Draw ===
First round
1 | (Sweden) N Kulti (United States) J Palmer | 4 | 3
(The Bahamas) M Knowles (Canada) D Nestor | 6 | 6
(India) M Bhupathi (Zimbabwe) B Black | 6 | 4 | 6
(Sweden) S Aspelin (Sweden) J Landsberg | 3 | 6 | 1
3 | (South Africa) P Norval (Zimbabwe) K Ullyett | 6 | 6
(Czech Republic) T Cibulec (Czech Republic) L Friedl | 1 | 4
(United States) J-M Gambill (United States) S Humphries | 1 | 7 | 4
(Japan) T Shimada (South Africa) M Wakefield | 6 | 5 | 6
WC | (Sweden) R Bergh (Sweden) A Vinciguerra | 5 | 7^{7} | 4
(Czech Republic) P Pála (Czech Republic) P Vízner | 7 | 6^{2} | 6
Q | (Sweden) R Lindstedt (Sweden) F Lovén | 7^{7} | 6
4 | (Czech Republic) D Rikl (Czech Republic) C Suk | 6^{5} | 3
(South Africa) C Haggard (Belgium) T Vanhoudt | 6 | 6
WC | (Sweden) J Adaktusson (Sweden) J Johansson | 4 | 4
LL | (Netherlands) S Schalken (Australia) P Tramacchi | 4 | 4
2 | (Sweden) J Björkman (Belarus) M Mirnyi | 6 | 6

Quarterfinals
(The Bahamas) M Knowles (Canada) D Nestor | 6 | 6
(India) M Bhupathi (Zimbabwe) B Black | 3 | 4
3 | (South Africa) P Norval (Zimbabwe) K Ullyett | 7^{10} | 6
(Japan) T Shimada (South Africa) M Wakefield | 6^{8} | 4
(Czech Republic) P Pála (Czech Republic) P Vízner | 6 | 6
Q | (Sweden) R Lindstedt (Sweden) F Lovén | 4 | 1
(South Africa) C Haggard (Belgium) T Vanhoudt | 5 | 6 | 6
2 | (Sweden) J Björkman (Belarus) M Mirnyi | 7 | 3 | 4

Semifinals
(The Bahamas) M Knowles (Canada) D Nestor | 3 | 6 | 6
3 | (South Africa) P Norval (Zimbabwe) K Ullyett | 6 | 1 | 4
(Czech Republic) P Pála (Czech Republic) P Vízner | 7^{9} | 7^{7}
(South Africa) C Haggard (Belgium) T Vanhoudt | 6^{7} | 6^{3}

Final
(The Bahamas) M Knowles (Canada) D Nestor | 6 | 6
(Czech Republic) P Pála (Czech Republic) P Vízner | 3 | 2
