= 2001 If Stockholm Open – Singles =

Singles
- 2001 If Stockholm Open

Final
- Champion: (Netherlands) Sjeng Schalken
- Runner-up: (Finland) Jarkko Nieminen
- Score: 3–6, 6–3, 6–3, 4–6, 6–3

Details
- Draw: 32
- Seeds: 8

Events
Singles	Doubles
- If Stockholm Open

Thomas Johansson was the defending champion but lost in the quarterfinals to Jarkko Nieminen.

Sjeng Schalken won in the final 3–6, 6–3, 6–3, 4–6, 6–3 against Nieminen.

== Seeds ==
1. (Australia) ~~Lleyton Hewitt~~ (withdrew because of a back injury)
2. (France) Sébastien Grosjean (second round)
3. (Sweden) Thomas Johansson (quarterfinals)
4. (Argentina) Guillermo Cañas (semifinals)
5. (Sweden) Thomas Enqvist (semifinals)
6. (Netherlands) Sjeng Schalken (champion)
7. (Morocco) Younes El Aynaoui (second round)
8. (South Africa) Wayne Ferreira (quarterfinals)

== Draw ==
Key

- Q = Qualifier
- WC = Wild card
- LL = Lucky loser
- Alt = Alternate
- ITF = ITF entry
- PR = Protected ranking
- SR = Special ranking
- SE = Special exempt
- JE = Junior exempt
- JR = Junior Accelerator Programme entrant
- CO = College Accelerator Programme entrant
- NG = Next Gen Accelerator Program entrant
- w/o = Walkover
- r = Retired
- d = Defaulted

=== Final ===
Semifinals
6	(Netherlands) Sjeng Schalken	6	6
4	(Argentina) Guillermo Cañas	4	2
Q	(Finland) Jarkko Nieminen	7^{7}	6
5	(Sweden) Thomas Enqvist	6^{4}	3

Final
6	(Netherlands) Sjeng Schalken	3	6	6	4	6
Q	(Finland) Jarkko Nieminen	6	3	3	6	3

=== Section 1 ===
First round
LL	(Czech Republic) J Vacek	6	7^{8}
(Spain) D Sánchez	3	6^{6}
(Spain) F Clavet	4	3
(Sweden) M Gustafsson	6	6
(Australia) W Arthurs	6	6
Q	(Netherlands) P Wessels	3	4
Q	(Netherlands) J van Lottum	1	3
6	(Netherlands) S Schalken	6	6
4	(Argentina) G Cañas	6	6
(Germany) N Kiefer	3	2
WC	(Sweden) M Larsson	6	7
Q	(United States) B Bryan	4	5
(Sweden) A Vinciguerra	6	7^{7}
WC	(Sweden) J Johansson	3	6^{4}
(Belgium) C Rochus	5	2
8	(South Africa) W Ferreira	7	6

Second round
LL	(Czech Republic) J Vacek	6	3	6
(Sweden) M Gustafsson	3	6	3
(Australia) W Arthurs	4	3
6	(Netherlands) S Schalken	6	6
4	(Argentina) G Cañas	6	6
WC	(Sweden) M Larsson	2	3
(Sweden) A Vinciguerra	7^{7}	6^{6}	6^{3}
8	(South Africa) W Ferreira	6^{3}	7^{8}	7^{7}

Quarterfinals
LL	(Czech Republic) J Vacek	3	6^{3}
6	(Netherlands) S Schalken	6	7^{7}
4	(Argentina) G Cañas	6	6
8	(South Africa) W Ferreira	3	1

Semifinals
6	(Netherlands) S Schalken	6	6
4	(Argentina) G Cañas	4	2

=== Section 2 ===
First round
7	(Morocco) Y El Aynaoui	7^{7}	6
(Argentina) F Squillari	6^{5}	4
(Denmark) K Pless	6^{1}	3
Q	(Finland) J Nieminen	7^{7}	6
(France) C Pioline	6	6
(Sweden) J Björkman	3	4
(Austria) M Hipfl	7^{7}	4	1^{r}
3	(Sweden) T Johansson	6^{4}	6	4
5	(Sweden) T Enqvist	7	6
(Czech Republic) M Tabara	5	3
(Paraguay) R Delgado	3	3
WC	(Sweden) R Söderling	6	6
(Chile) M Ríos	6	3	6
(United States) M Russell	2	6	4
(Australia) M Philippoussis	2	7	2
2	(France) S Grosjean	6	5	6

Second round
7	(Morocco) Y El Aynaoui	3	1
Q	(Finland) J Nieminen	6	6
(France) C Pioline	1	7	3
3	(Sweden) T Johansson	6	5	6
5	(Sweden) T Enqvist	7	6
WC	(Sweden) R Söderling	5	3
(Chile) M Ríos	6	6
2	(France) S Grosjean	3	4

Quarterfinals
Q	(Finland) J Nieminen	6	6
3	(Sweden) T Johansson	2	4
5	(Sweden) T Enqvist	6	6^{7}	7
(Chile) M Ríos	4	7^{9}	5

Semifinals
Q	(Finland) J Nieminen	7^{7}	6
5	(Sweden) T Enqvist	6^{4}	3
