= Marcus Sarstrand =

Swedish tennis player

- Full name: Marcus Sarstrand
- Country (sports): Sweden
- Born: 24 July 1978 (age 46)
- Prize money: $145,732

Singles
- Career record: 1–3
- Career titles: 0
- Highest ranking: No. 240 (31 January 2005)

Grand Slam singles results
- Australian Open: Q2 (2005)
- French Open: Q2 (2005)
- US Open: Q1 (2005)

Doubles
- Highest ranking: No. 509 (16 June 2003)

Marcus Sarstrand (born 24 July 1978) is a former professional tennis player from Sweden.

== Biography ==
=== Early life ===
Sarstrand comes from Borås and started playing tennis at the age of seven. He competed in the boys' singles events at both the French Open and Wimbledon in 1996.

=== Professional career ===
At the Swedish Open in 1997, Sarstrand upset top seed Thomas Johansson, who was ranked 35th in the world, compared to his own ranking of 841. It was Sarstrand's first year as a professional player and he was making his debut in an ATP Tour main draw. He was eliminated in the second round by Patrik Fredriksson.

In 1999 he had the distinction of defeating both Roger Federer and Robin Söderling at the same ATP Tour tournament, which he achieved in the qualifying draw for the Stockholm Open. Despite these wins he fell in the final round of qualifying and didn't appear in the main draw at Stockholm until 2000, where he lost to Andreas Vinciguerra in the first round.

He also competed in the main draw of the 2003 Swedish Open and was beaten in the first round by second seed Tommy Robredo.

=== Personal life ===
Sarstrand now lives in the US state of South Carolina. He met wife Amy Baruch while playing a tournament in Spartanburg in 2008 and they were married the following year.
