= Jarkko Nieminen =

Finnish tennis player (born 1981)

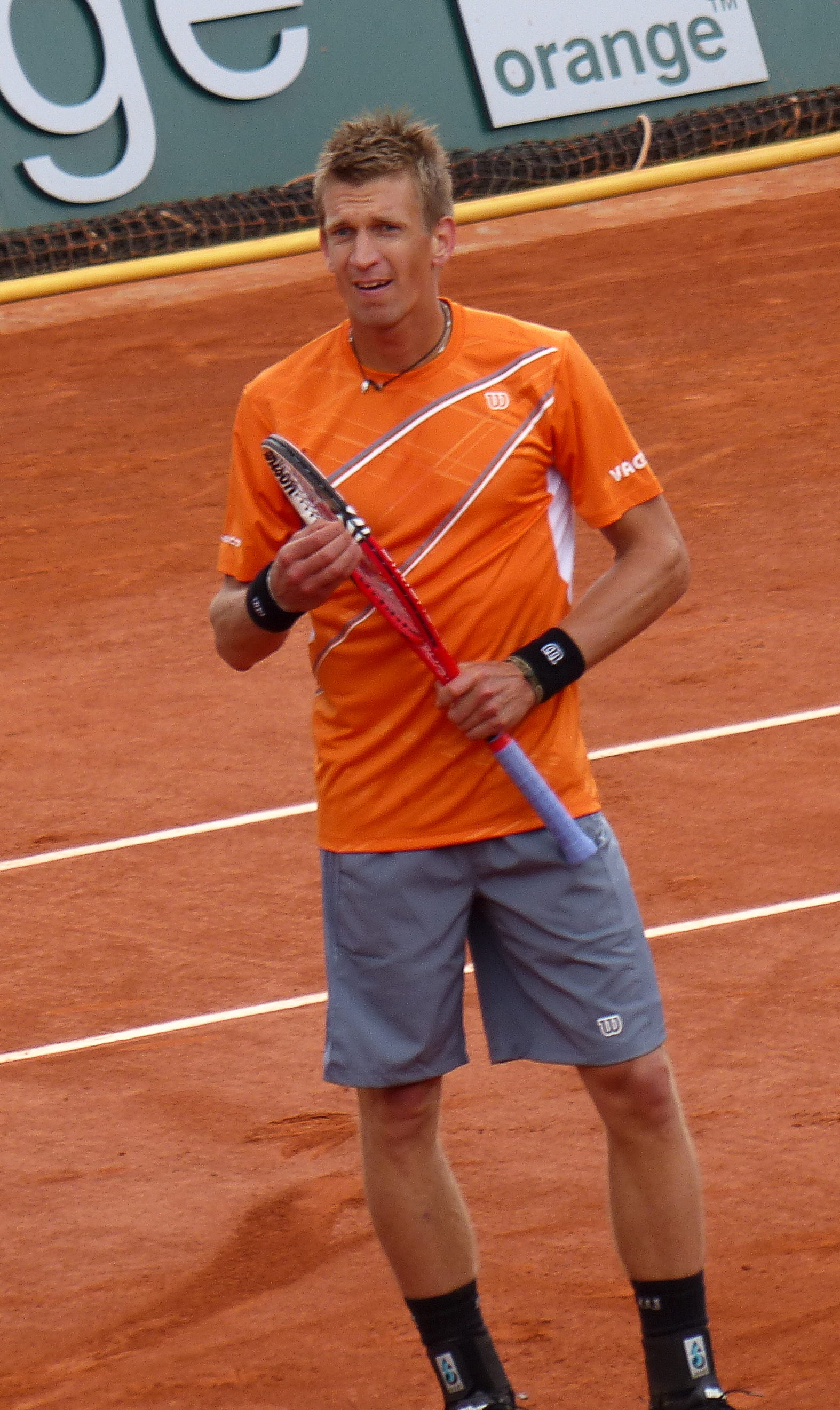
- Nieminen at the 2013 French Open
- Country (sports): Finland
- Residence: Masku, Finland
- Born: 23 July 1981 (age 45) Masku, Finland
- Height: 1.85 m (6 ft 1 in)
- Turned pro: 2000
- Retired: 9 November 2015 (last match played in July 2016)
- Plays: Left-handed (two-handed backhand)
- Prize money: US$7,743,345

Singles
- Career record: 408–348 (54.0%)
- Career titles: 2
- Highest ranking: No. 13 (10 July 2006)

Grand Slam singles results
- Australian Open: QF (2008)
- French Open: 4R (2003)
- Wimbledon: QF (2006)
- US Open: QF (2005)

Other tournaments
- Olympic Games: 2R (2004, 2012)

Doubles
- Career record: 151–193
- Career titles: 5
- Highest ranking: No. 42 (28 January 2008)

Grand Slam doubles results
- Australian Open: SF (2010)
- French Open: 2R (2003, 2008, 2014)
- Wimbledon: 2R (2007)
- US Open: QF (2008)

Mixed doubles
- Career record: 1–1

Grand Slam mixed doubles results
- Wimbledon: 2R (2007)

Team competitions
- Davis Cup: PO (1999, 2002)

Jarkko Kalervo Nieminen (born 23 July 1981) is a Finnish former professional tennis player. His highest ranking of world No. 13, achieved in July 2006, is a Finnish record. He has won two ATP singles titles and five doubles titles in his career. His best performances in Grand Slam tournaments have been reaching the quarterfinals of the 2005 US Open, the 2006 Wimbledon Championships, and the 2008 Australian Open.

Statistically Finland's best player to date, Nieminen is also the first and so far only Finnish player to have won an ATP singles title and to have reached the quarterfinals of a Grand Slam singles event. He is also notable for winning the shortest recorded Masters Tour tennis match in Open Era history, defeating Bernard Tomic in just 28 minutes and 20 seconds in the first round of the 2014 Sony Open Tennis. He was ranked inside the Top 75 11 times in 14 years (2001 to 2014).

On 23 June 2015, he announced his retirement from professional tennis at the end of the season, playing 2015 Stockholm Open as his last event.

His wife, Anu Nieminen, is Finland's top-ranked badminton women's single player.

In April 2016, it was announced that Nieminen will compete in floorball in season 2016–2017 at Finnish Salibandyliiga representing SC Classic.

== Junior career ==
As a junior Nieminen reached as high as No. 9 in the world in 1999 (and No. 20 in doubles), and won the 1999 Jr US Open.

== Career highlights ==
=== 1999 ===
- Defeated Kristian Pless of Denmark to win his first junior Grand Slam, the US Open.
- Finished the year at No. 11 in the world junior rankings.
- Made his Davis Cup debut against Italy, losing to Andrea Gaudenzi.

=== 2000 ===
- Won his first Davis Cup match, beating Mikael Tillström of Sweden in a dead-rubber.

=== 2001: Breaking the top 100 ===
- Became the first Finn to reach an ATP final since Leo Palin in 1981, beating Pless, Younes El Aynaoui, defending champion Thomas Johansson and three-time winner Thomas Enqvist, before losing to Sjeng Schalken in five sets in Stockholm.
- Posted a 38–12 Challenger record, winning four titles.
- Finished the year in the top 100 for the first time.

=== 2002: Breaking the top 50 ===
- Reached clay-court finals in Estoril and Mallorca, losing to David Nalbandian and Gastón Gaudio, respectively.
- Became the first Finnish player to end the season in the top 50.

=== 2003 ===
- Reached his fourth career ATP final in Munich, losing to Roger Federer.
- Advanced to the fourth round at the 2003 French Open, losing to Fernando González.
- Achieved Finland's first Wimbledon seeding (30)
- Was at best ranked World No. 27, a career-high until 2006.

=== 2004 ===
- Represented Finland at the 2004 Summer Olympics in Athens, losing to Max Mirnyi in the second round.
- Finished in the top 100 for the fourth consecutive year, despite missing nearly three months due to injury.

=== 2005 ===
- Defeated world no. 7 Andre Agassi in a first round five-setter at the 2005 French Open.
- Was defeated in five sets by Lleyton Hewitt in the quarterfinals of the 2005 U.S. Open, having become the first Finn to reach a Grand Slam quarterfinal.

=== 2006: First ATP title ===
- Won his first ATP singles title in January by defeating Mario Ančić in the final in Auckland.
- Recorded his career-best ATP Masters Series performance by reaching the quarterfinals of the Indian Wells Masters, but lost to Paradorn Srichaphan.
- Broke into the top 20 for the first time in his career in April.
- Reached the quarterfinals at Wimbledon, but lost to World No. 2 Rafael Nadal in straight sets.
- Broke into the top 15 for the first time in his career in July after his Wimbledon success.
- Reached the quarterfinals of the Canada Masters, losing to Andy Murray.
- Reached his sixth career ATP final in Stockholm, losing to James Blake.
- Finished the season by reaching the quarterfinals of the Paris Masters, where he lost to Tommy Robredo.

=== 2007: 200 wins ===
- Won his first ATP doubles title in September, paired with Robert Lindstedt. They beat Aisam-ul-Haq Qureshi and Rohan Bopanna in Mumbai, India on hard courts.
- His best singles performance in 2007 came at Davidoff Swiss Indoors, where he was beaten in the finals by World No. 1 Roger Federer in straight sets, 6–3, 6–4. En route to the finals, he had beaten Robby Ginepri, Guillermo Cañas, World No. 8 Fernando González, and Marcos Baghdatis.

=== 2008 ===
- Lost to Michaël Llodra in the final at the Adelaide International, 3–6, 4–6.
- Made the quarter-finals at the Australian Open, losing in straight sets to Rafael Nadal.
- Represented Finland at the 2008 Summer Olympics in Beijing, losing to Swede Thomas Johansson in the first round.

=== 2009 ===
- Defeated top seed Novak Djokovic in the 2009 Medibank International semifinal, 6–4, 7–6. He lost to David Nalbandian in the final, 4–6, 7–6, 2–6.
- Withdrew from the 2009 Australian Open halfway through his first-round clash with 28th seed Paul-Henri Mathieu.
- Underwent surgery for a wrist injury and sidelined for three months, thus missing Roland Garros and Wimbledon.
- Returned to professional tennis at the New Haven tournament in the US in August.
- Defeated Frenchman Stéphane Robert in the ATP Challenger tournament final in Jersey, United Kingdom in November.

=== 2010 ===
- Defeated Nick Lindahl in the first round of the Australian Open, before losing a tight five-set match to Florent Serra in the second round after having two match points in the fourth set. In the doubles competition, he reached the semifinals with partner Michael Kohlmann, losing to the top seeds Bob Bryan and Mike Bryan.
- Reached his first semifinal of the season at the Delray Beach International Tennis Championships, beating Paolo Lorenzi, 6–3, 6–4, in the first round, Evgeny Korolev, 5–7, 6–1, 6–0, in the second round, winning 12 consecutive games to close out the match, and finally third seed Benjamin Becker in the quarterfinals. In the semifinals, he lost against Ernests Gulbis of Latvia, who ended up winning the tournament against Ivo Karlović in the final.
- Won his second doubles title with Swede Johan Brunström in Gstaad, Switzerland on clay courts.
- Lost to Guillermo García López in the PTT Thailand Open final, 6–4, 3–6, 6–4.

=== 2011: 300 wins ===
- Reached his 11th career ATP final in Stockholm, losing to Gaël Monfils.

=== 2012: 2nd ATP Title ===
- Nieminen won the Sydney International for his second career title against Julien Benneteau. He was a finalist in doubles in the same tournament with Matthew Ebden against Mike Bryan and Bob Bryan.
- He was a quarterfinalist at the Open Sud de France and in Rotterdam.
- In the 2012 Summer Olympics, Nieminen lost to eventual good medalist Andy Murray in the second round,

=== 2013 ===
- Nieminen was the runner-up at the Power Horse Cup in Düsseldorf, losing to Juan Mónaco in the final.
- Nieminen reached a Masters quarterfinal for the first time since 2006 after beating no. 7 Juan Martín del Potro in the third round of the Monte-Carlo Masters. He also reached the third round in Indian Wells and Miami.
- Nieminen was a quarterfinalist at the Valencia Open 500, the Japan Open, and the Sydney International.
- He was semifinalist at the Open Sud de France, losing to Richard Gasquet.
- He won the Helsinki Challenger.
- He won his third doubles title at the BMW Open with Dmitry Tursunov.

=== 2014 ===
- Nieminen started the year 13th time in a row in the top 100.
- He reached the Open Sud de France and Malaysian Open semifinals and the third round of the Indian Wells Masters and the Madrid Masters.
- He played the shortest recorded Masters tennis match, defeating Bernard Tomic at the Miami Masters in 28 minutes and 20 seconds.
- Reached the second round in three of the four Grand Slams, one of the longest Wimbledon tiebreakers losing to ninth seed John Isner.
- He won his fourth doubles title at the Bet-at-home Cup Kitzbühel, the first by an all-Finnish team, with Henri Kontinen.

=== 2015: 400 wins and retirement ===
At Wimbledon, Nieminen, who had already announced his retirement at the end of the season, played Lleyton Hewitt in the first round, with Hewitt also stating his intention to retire before the 2016 event. Nieminen earned his first win over Hewitt in five sets. At the US Open, Nieminen played his final match at a major, losing to Jo-Wilfried Tsonga in the first round in straight sets.

Nieminen played his final ATP match on 20 October at the 2015 Stockholm Open, losing 6–3, 6–7, 4–6 to Nicolás Almagro. Jarkko had match points in the second-set tiebreaker but narrowly missed one and was very unlucky to lose the other. Fellow Scandinavian tennis player Robin Söderling was in attendance to pay tribute to Jarkko and the Finn was visibly moved as he gave his farewell speech. His final match was an exhibition against Roger Federer at the Hartwall Arena in Helsinki on 9 November 2015.

=== 2016: Comeback at the Davis Cup ===
Nieminen came out of retirement in order to play for his country at the Davis Cup against Zimbabwe. He won his singles tie with a so-called triple bagel with a victory over Courtney John Lock, making him the first player to win by such a scoreline at any tournament since 2011, and one of two players to accomplish the feat on that day (Emilio Gómez of Ecuador earned a triple-bagel victory over Adam Hornby of Barbados at Davis Cup competition elsewhere).

== ATP career finals ==
=== Singles: 13 (2 titles, 11 runner-ups) ===
Legend Grand Slam tournaments (0–0) ATP World Tour Finals (0–0) ATP World Tour Masters 1000 (0–0) ATP World Tour 500 Series (0–0) ATP World Tour 250 Series (2–11)	Titles by surface Hard (2–7) Clay (0–4) Grass (0–0)	Titles by setting Outdoor (2–6) Indoor (0–5)

Result	W–L	Date	Tournament	Tier	Surface	Opponent	Score
Loss	0–1	Oct 2001	Stockholm Open, Sweden	International	Hard (i)	(Netherlands) Sjeng Schalken	6–3, 3–6, 3–6, 6–4, 3–6
Loss	0–2	Apr 2002	Estoril Open, Portugal	International	Clay	(Argentina) David Nalbandian	4–6, 6–7^{(5–7)}
Loss	0–3	May 2002	Majorca Open, Spain	International	Clay	(Argentina) Gastón Gaudio	2–6, 3–6
Loss	0–4	May 2003	Bavarian Championships, Germany	International	Clay	(Switzerland) Roger Federer	1–6, 4–6
Win	1–4	Jan 2006	Auckland Open, New Zealand	International	Hard	(Croatia) Mario Ančić	6–2, 6–2
Loss	1–5	Oct 2006	Stockholm Open, Sweden	International	Hard (i)	(United States) James Blake	4–6, 2–6
Loss	1–6	Oct 2007	Swiss Indoors, Switzerland	International	Hard (i)	(Switzerland) Roger Federer	3–6, 4–6
Loss	1–7	Jan 2008	Adelaide International, Australia	International	Hard	(France) Michaël Llodra	3–6, 4–6
Loss	1–8	Jan 2009	Sydney International, Australia	250 Series	Hard	(Argentina) David Nalbandian	3–6, 7–6^{(11–9)}, 2–6
Loss	1–9	Oct 2010	Thailand Open, Thailand	250 Series	Hard (i)	(Spain) Guillermo García López	4–6, 6–3, 4–6
Loss	1–10	Oct 2011	Stockholm Open, Sweden	250 Series	Hard (i)	(France) Gaël Monfils	5–7, 6–3, 2–6
Win	2–10	Jan 2012	Sydney International, Australia	250 Series	Hard	(France) Julien Benneteau	6–2, 7–5
Loss	2–11	May 2013	Düsseldorf Open, Germany	250 Series	Clay	(Argentina) Juan Mónaco	4–6, 3–6

=== Doubles: 9 (5 titles, 4 runner-ups) ===
Legend Grand Slam tournaments (0–0) ATP World Tour Finals (0–0) ATP World Tour Masters 1000 (0–0) ATP World Tour 500 Series (0–0) ATP World Tour 250 Series (5–4)	Titles by surface Hard (1–4) Clay (4–0) Grass (0–0)	Titles by setting Outdoor (5–1) Indoor (0–3)

Result	W–L	Date	Tournament	Tier	Surface	Partner	Opponents	Score
Loss	0–1	Sep 2003	Thailand Open, Thailand	International	Hard (i)	(Australia) Andrew Kratzmann	(Israel) Jonathan Erlich (Israel) Andy Ram	3–6, 6–7^{(4–7)}
Win	1–1	Sep 2007	Mumbai Open, India	International	Hard	(Sweden) Robert Lindstedt	(India) Rohan Bopanna (Pakistan) Aisam-ul-Haq Qureshi	7–6^{(7–3)}, 7–6^{(7–5)}
Loss	1–2	Feb 2009	Pacific Coast Championships, US	250 Series	Hard (i)	(India) Rohan Bopanna	(Germany) Tommy Haas (Czech Republic) Radek Štěpánek	2–6, 3–6
Win	2–2	Aug 2010	Swiss Open, Switzerland	250 Series	Clay	(Sweden) Johan Brunström	(Brazil) Marcelo Melo (Brazil) Bruno Soares	6–3, 6–7^{(4–7)}, [11–9]
Loss	2–3	Oct 2010	Stockholm Open, Sweden	250 Series	Hard (i)	(Sweden) Johan Brunström	(United States) Eric Butorac (Netherlands Antilles) Jean-Julien Rojer	3–6, 4–6
Loss	2–4	Jan 2012	Sydney International, Australia	250 Series	Hard	(Australia) Matthew Ebden	(United States) Bob Bryan (United States) Mike Bryan	1–6, 4–6
Win	3–4	May 2013	Bavarian Championships, Germany	250 Series	Clay	(Russia) Dmitry Tursunov	(Cyprus) Marcos Baghdatis (United States) Eric Butorac	6–1, 6–4
Win	4–4	Aug 2014	Austrian Open Kitzbühel, Austria	250 Series	Clay	(Finland) Henri Kontinen	(Italy) Daniele Bracciali (Kazakhstan) Andrey Golubev	6–1, 6–4
Win	5–4	Mar 2015	Argentina Open, Argentina	250 Series	Clay	(Brazil) André Sá	(Spain) Pablo Andújar (Austria) Oliver Marach	4–6, 6–4, [10–7]

== ATP Challenger and ITF Futures finals ==
=== Singles: 15 (10–5) ===
Legend (singles) ATP Challenger Tour (10–4) ITF Futures Tour (0–1)	Finals by surface Hard (4–2) Clay (5–3) Grass (0–0) Carpet (1–0)

Result	W–L	Date	Tournament	Tier	Surface	Opponent	Score
Win	1–0	Feb 2001	Wolfsburg, Germany	Challenger	Carpet	(Germany) Andy Fahlke	3–6, 6–2, 7–5
Loss	1–1	May 2001	Great Britain F5, Newcastle	Futures	Clay	(France) Sébastien de Chaunac	4–6, 2–6
Loss	1–2	May 2001	Budapest, Hungary	Challenger	Clay	(Italy) Giorgio Galimberti	4–6, 7–5, 1–6
Win	2–2	Jul 2001	Tampere, Finland	Challenger	Clay	(Sweden) Mathias Hellström	6–1, 6–0
Win	3–2	Aug 2001	Córdoba, Spain	Challenger	Hard	(France) Paul-Henri Mathieu	6–4, 2–6, 6–3
Win	4–2	Sep 2001	Maia, Portugsl	Challenger	Clay	(Spain) Feliciano López	5–7, 6–3, 6–4
Win	5–2	Jul 2002	Tampere, Finland	Challenger	Clay	(France) Richard Gasquet	7–5, 7–6^{(7–2)}
Win	6–2	Nov 2002	Helsinki, Finland	Challenger	Hard	(Croatia) Lovro Zovko	7–5, 4–6, 7–5
Win	7–2	Jun 2005	Prostějov, Czech Republic	Challenger	Clay	(Czech Republic) Ivo Minář	6–1, 6–3
Win	8–2	Nov 2009	Jersey, Great Britain	Challenger	Hard	(France) Stéphane Robert	4–6, 6–1, 7–5
Loss	8–3	Dec 2009	Salzburg, Austria	Challenger	Hard	(Germany) Michael Berrer	7–6^{(7–4)}, 4–6, 4–6
Win	9–3	Mar 2010	Marrakesh, Morocco	Challenger	Clay	(Ukraine) Alexandr Dolgopolov	6–3, 6–2
Loss	9–4	Nov 2012	Helsinki, Finland	Challenger	Hard	(Slovakia) Lukáš Lacko	3–6, 4–6
Win	10–4	Nov 2013	Helsinki, Finland	Challenger	Hard	(Lithuania) Ričardas Berankis	6–3, 6–1
Loss	10–5	Jul 2014	Tampere, Finland	Challenger	Clay	(Belgium) David Goffin	6–7^{(3–7)}, 3–6

=== Doubles: 14 (6–8) ===
Legend (doubles) ATP Challenger Tour (4–6) ITF Futures Tour (2–2)	Finals by surface Hard (2–3) Clay (3–3) Grass (0–0) Carpet (1–2)

Result	W–L	Date	Tournament	Tier	Surface	Partner	Opponents	Score
Loss	0–1	Jul 1999	Tampere, Finland	Challenger	Clay	(Finland) Timo Nieminen	(Czech Republic) Petr Dezort (Czech Republic) Radomír Vašek	1–6, 1–6
Win	1–1	Mar 2000	Japan F2, Shirako	Futures	Carpet	(Republic of Ireland) Scott Barron	(Japan) Mitsura Takada (Japan) Akira Matsushita	6–3, 6–3
Win	2–1	May 2000	Austria F2, Telfs	Futures	Clay	(Republic of Ireland) Scott Barron	(Austria) Stefan Leiner (Germany) Patrick Sommer	7–6^{(7–2)}, 6–1
Loss	2–2	Jun 2000	Ireland F1, Dublin	Futures	Carpet	(Denmark) Kristian Pless	(Belgium) Gilles Elseneer (France) Jean-Michel Pequery	6–7^{(2–7)}, 6–4, 3–6
Win	3–2	Jul 2000	Tampere, Finland	Challenger	Clay	(Finland) Ville Liukko	(Australia) Steven Randjelovic (Federal Republic of Yugoslavia) Dušan Vemić	6–0, 4–6, 6–3
Loss	3–3	Oct 2000	Finland F2, Helsinki	Futures	Carpet	(Finland) Tero Vilen	(Slovakia) Karol Beck (Slovakia) Igor Zelenay	2–6, 4–6
Loss	3–4	Jul 2001	Tampere, Finland	Challenger	Clay	(Finland) Tuomas Ketola	(Australia) Stephen Huss (Australia) Lee Pearson	5–7, 7–6^{(7–5)}, 4–6
Win	4–4	Sep 2001	Budapest, Hungary	Challenger	Clay	(Austria) Oliver Marach	(Russia) Yuriy Schukin (Ukraine) Orest Tereshchuk	6–2, 6–2
Loss	4–5	Jul 2002	Tampere, Finland	Challenger	Clay	(Finland) Tuomas Ketola	(Australia) Doug Bohaboy (Australia) Nick Rainey	4–6, 2–6
Loss	4–6	Nov 2009	Jersey, United Kingdom	Challenger	Hard	(Finland) Henri Kontinen	(Denmark) Frederik Nielsen (Australia) Joseph Sirianni	5–7, 6–3, [2–10]
Loss	4–7	Nov 2009	Helsinki, Finland	Challenger	Hard	(Finland) Henri Kontinen	(India) Rohan Bopanna (Pakistan) Aisam Qureshi	2–6, 6–7^{(7–9)}
Loss	4–8	Nov 2010	Helsinki, Finland	Challenger	Hard	(Finland) Henri Kontinen	(Germany) Dustin Brown (Germany) Martin Emmrich	6–7^{(17–19)}, 6–0, [7–10]
Win	5–8	Nov 2013	Helsinki, Finland	Challenger	Hard	(Finland) Henri Kontinen	(Germany) Dustin Brown (Germany) Philipp Marx	7–5, 5–7, [10–5]
Win	6–8	Nov 2014	Helsinki, Finland	Challenger	Hard	(Finland) Henri Kontinen	(United Kingdom) Jonathan Marray (Germany) Philipp Petzschner	7–6^{(7–2)}, 6–4

== Junior Grand Slam finals ==
=== Singles: 1 (1 title) ===
Result	Year	Tournament	Surface	Opponent	Score
Win	1999	US Open	Hard	(Denmark) Kristian Pless	6–7, 6–3, 6–4

=== Doubles: 1 (1 runner-up) ===
Result	Year	Tournament	Surface	Partner	Opponents	Score
Loss	1999	Wimbledon	Grass	(Bulgaria) Todor Enev	(Argentina) Guillermo Coria (Argentina) David Nalbandian	5–7, 4–6

== Performance timelines ==
Key
W	F	SF	QF	#R	RR	Q#	DNQ	A	NH

(W) winner; (F) finalist; (SF) semifinalist; (QF) quarterfinalist; (#R) rounds 4, 3, 2, 1; (RR) round-robin stage; (Q#) qualification round; (DNQ) did not qualify; (A) absent; (NH) not held; (SR) strike rate (events won / competed); (W–L) win–loss record.

=== Singles ===
Tournament	2001	2002	2003	2004	2005	2006	2007	2008	2009	2010	2011	2012	2013	2014	2015	W–L	Win %
Grand Slam tournaments
Australian Open	A	1R	3R	2R	3R	3R	2R	QF	1R	2R	1R	1R	2R	2R	3R	17–14	54.84
French Open	A	3R	4R	A	2R	1R	3R	3R	A	1R	1R	2R	2R	2R	1R	13–12	52.00
Wimbledon	A	2R	3R	A	1R	QF	3R	2R	A	2R	1R	2R	1R	2R	2R	14–12	53.85
US Open	Q3	1R	2R	1R	QF	1R	1R	3R	2R	1R	1R	2R	2R	1R	1R	10–14	41.67
Win–loss	0–0	3–4	8–4	1–2	7–4	6–4	5–4	9–4	1–2	2–4	0–4	3–4	3–4	3–4	3–4	54–52	50.94
ATP Masters Series
Indian Wells Masters	A	A	1R	2R	2R	QF	3R	2R	2R	A	2R	1R	3R	3R	2R	12–12	50.00
Miami Masters	A	2R	3R	2R	2R	3R	4R	2R	2R	A	1R	1R	3R	2R	2R	11–13	45.83
Monte Carlo Masters	A	A	3R	2R	A	1R	1R	2R	Q2	1R	2R	2R	QF	1R	Q1	9–9	50.00
Rome Masters	A	A	3R	A	A	2R	1R	1R	A	Q2	3R	1R	1R	A	A	5–7	41.67
Madrid Masters	A	2R	1R	Q1	A	1R	1R	2R	A	A	A	A	A	3R	A	4–6	40.00
Canada Masters	A	2R	1R	A	A	QF	2R	1R	A	1R	1R	A	1R	A	A	5–8	38.46
Cincinnati Masters	A	3R	2R	A	A	1R	3R	1R	A	Q2	Q1	1R	2R	A	A	6–7	46.15
Shanghai Masters	Not Masters Series								A	A	A	1R	1R	A	A	0–2	00.00
Paris Masters	A	2R	1R	A	1R	QF	2R	1R	A	2R	Q2	A	1R	Q2	A	5–8	38.46
Hamburg Masters	A	A	2R	A	A	3R	3R	2R	Not Masters Series							6–4	60.00
Win–loss	0–0	6–5	7–9	1–2	2–3	12–9	9–9	3–9	2–2	1–3	4–5	1–6	8–8	5–4	2–2	63–76	45.32
Career statistics
Titles–Finals	0–1	0–2	0–1	0–0	0–0	1–2	0–1	0–1	0–1	0–1	0–1	1–1	0–1	0–0	0–0	2–13	15.38
Year End Ranking	61	40	36	77	28	15	27	37	88	39	77	41	39	73	153	$7,743,345	

=== Doubles ===
Tournament	2003	2004	2005	2006	2007	2008	2009	2010	2011	2012	2013	2014	2015	W–L	Win %
Grand Slam tournaments
Australian Open	1R	A	2R	2R	1R	2R	2R	SF	2R	1R	2R	2R	1R	11–11	50.00
French Open	2R	A	A	1R	1R	2R	A	1R	1R	1R	A	2R	1R	3–9	25.00
Wimbledon	1R	A	A	1R	2R	A	A	1R	1R	1R	1R	1R	A	1–8	11.11
US Open	A	A	1R	3R	2R	QF	2R	2R	1R	1R	1R	1R	A	8–10	44.44
Win–loss	1–3	0–0	1–1	3–4	2–4	5–3	2–2	5–4	1–4	0–4	1–3	2–4	0–2	23–38	37.70

== Best Grand Slam results details ==
	Australian Open	
2008 Australian Open (24th Seed)
Round	Opponent	Score
1R	(Canada) Frank Dancevic	6–3, 6–1, 5–7, 2–6, 6–1
2R	(United States) Jesse Levine (WC)	6–2, 7–5, 7–6^{(7–2)}
3R	(United States) Mardy Fish	3–6, 7–6^{(7–4)}, 6–3, 6–1
4R	(Germany) Philipp Kohlschreiber (29)	3–6, 7–6^{(9–7)}, 7–6^{(11–9)}, 6–3
QF	(Spain) Rafael Nadal (2)	5–7, 3–6, 1–6

	French Open	
2003 French Open (30th Seed)
Round	Opponent	Score
1R	(France) Nicolas Escudé	7–6^{(7–3)}, 6–7^{(4–7)}, 6–3, 6–1
2R	(France) Julien Varlet (Q)	1–6, 1–6, 7–6^{(7–4)}, 6–2, 6–4
3R	(Romania) Victor Hănescu (Q)	6–7^{(1–7)}, 6–4, 6–2, 3–6, 6–3
4R	(Chile) Fernando González (19)	3–6, 3–6, 2–6

	Wimbledon Championships	
2006 Wimbledon (22nd Seed)
Round	Opponent	Score
1R	(Brazil) Marcos Daniel	6–2, 6–4, 7–5
2R	(United Kingdom) Martin Lee (WC)	6–4, 6–0, 6–3
3R	(Germany) Philipp Kohlschreiber	1–6, 6–2, 6–3, 7–6^{(7–4)}
4R	(Russia) Dmitry Tursunov (27)	7–5, 6–4, 6–7^{(2–7)}, 6–7^{(6–8)}, 9–7
QF	(Spain) Rafael Nadal (2)	3–6, 4–6, 4–6

	US Open	
2005 US Open
Round	Opponent	Score
1R	(Slovakia) Karol Beck	6–4, 2–6, 7–5, 0–6, 7–5
2R	(Germany) Björn Phau	6–2, 6–4, 5–7, 6–4
3R	(Belarus) Max Mirnyi (30)	6–3, 7–6^{(7–5)}, 3–6, 6–3
4R	(Spain) Fernando Verdasco	6–2, 7–6^{(8–6)}, 6–3
QF	(Australia) Lleyton Hewitt (3)	6–2, 1–6, 6–3, 3–6, 1–6

== Record against top 10 players ==
Nieminen's record against those who have been ranked in the top 10, with active players in boldface.

Player	Years	MP	Record	Win%	Hard	Grass	Clay	Carpet	Last match
**Number 1 ranked players**									
(United States) Andre Agassi	2003–05	2	1–1	50%	0–1	–	1–0	–	Won (7–5, 4–6, 6–7^{(6–8)}, 6–1, 6–0) at **2005 French Open 1R**
(Serbia) **Novak Djokovic**	2006–15	7	1–6	14%	1–2	0–1	0–3	–	Lost (4–6, 2–6, 3–6) at **2015 Wimbledon 2R**
(Switzerland) **Roger Federer**	2002–15	15	0–15	0%	0–10	0–1	0–3	0–1	Lost (2–6, 5–7) at 2015 Istanbul 2R
(Spain) Juan Carlos Ferrero	2002–10	5	1–4	20%	0–1	–	1–3	–	Lost (2–6, 6–3, 4–6) at 2010 Hamburg 3R
(Australia) Lleyton Hewitt	2002–15	6	1–5	17%	0–3	1–0	0–1	0–1	Won (3–6, 6–3, 4–6, 6–0, 11–9) at **2015 Wimbledon 1R**
(Russia) Yevgeny Kafelnikov	2003	4	3–1	75%	1–0	–	2–0	0–1	Won (6–4, 0–1 ret.) at 2003 Munich SF
(Spain) Carlos Moyá	2003–05	2	1–1	50%	1–0	–	0–1	–	Lost (5–7, 7–5, 2–6) at 2005 Barcelona 2R
(United Kingdom) **Andy Murray**	2006–12	5	0–5	0%	0–2	0–2	0–1	–	Lost (2–6, 4–6) at 2012 Summer Olympics 2R
(Spain) **Rafael Nadal**	2005–14	8	0–8	0%	0–1	0–1	0–6	–	Lost (1–6, 4–6) at 2014 Madrid 3R
(Chile) Marcelo Ríos	2002	1	1–0	100%	–	–	–	1–0	Won (7–6^{(7–5)}, 3–6, 7–6^{(7–4)}) at 2002 Moscow 1R
(United States) Andy Roddick	2010	2	0–2	0%	0–2	–	–	–	Lost (1–6, 4–6) at 2010 Paris 2R
(Russia) Marat Safin	2002–07	8	2–6	25%	1–4	–	1–2	–	Lost (7–5, 3–6, 2–6) at 2007 Monte Carlo 1R
(United States) Pete Sampras	2002	2	0–2	0%	0–2	–	–	–	Lost (6–4, 3–6, 2–6) at 2002 Miami 2R
Number 2 ranked players									
(Spain) Àlex Corretja	2003	1	1–0	100%	1–0	–	–	–	Won (6–4, 6–0) at 2003 Rotterdam 1R
(Germany) Tommy Haas	2002–13	4	1–3	25%	1–2	–	0–1	–	Won (7–6^{(7–3)}, 4–6, 6–3, 4–6, 8–6) at **2013 Australian Open 1R**
(Croatia) Goran Ivanišević	2002	1	0–1	0%	0–1	–	–	–	Lost (6–7^{(5–7)}, 3–6) at 2002 Auckland 1R
(Sweden) Magnus Norman	2002	1	1–0	100%	–	–	1–0	–	Won (7–5, 6–2) at 2002 Amersfoort 2R
Number 3 ranked players									
(Croatia) **Marin Čilić**	2008–12	2	1–1	50%	1–0	0–1	–	–	Won (6–3, 3–6, 6–2) at 2012 Delray Beach 1R
(Argentina) Guillermo Coria	2003	2	0–2	0%	0–1	–	0–1	–	Lost (3–6, 4–6) at 2003 Hamburg 2R
(Russia) Nikolay Davydenko	2003–13	7	3–4	43%	2–2	–	1–2	–	Won (6–3, 7–6^{(10–8)}) at 2013 Montpellier 2R
(Argentina) Juan Martín del Potro	2008–13	5	1–4	20%	0–4	–	1–0	–	Won (6–4, 4–6, 7–6^{(7–4)}) at 2013 Monte Carlo 3R
(Bulgaria) **Grigor Dimitrov**	2009	1	1–0	100%	1–0	–	–	–	Won (6–0, 6–2) at 2009 Stockholm 1R
(Spain) David Ferrer	2011	3	1–2	33%	1–1	–	0–1	–	Lost (3–6, 3–6, 1–6) at **2011 French Open 1R**
(Croatia) Ivan Ljubičić	2007–10	2	0–2	0%	0–2	–	–	–	Lost (6–4, 3–6, 6–7^{(6–8)}) at 2010 Montpellier QF
(Argentina) David Nalbandian	2002–13	13	5–8	38%	5–6	–	0–2	–	Won (2–6, 6–4, 6–3) at 2013 Miami 1R
(Canada) **Milos Raonic**	2012–13	2	2–0	100%	1–0	–	1–0	–	Won (6–3, 1–6, 7–6^{(7–3)}) at 2013 Monte Carlo 2R
(Austria) **Dominic Thiem**	2011–14	2	1–1	50%	1–1	–	–	–	Lost (4–6, 6–4, 4–6) at 2014 Rotterdam 1R
(Switzerland) **Stan Wawrinka**	2009–15	3	1–2	33%	1–2	–	–	–	Lost (4–6, 2–6, 4–6) at **2015 Australian Open 3R**
(Germany) **Alexander Zverev**	2015	1	0–1	0%	–	0–1	–	–	Lost (4–6, 4–6) at 2015 Halle 1R
Number 4 ranked players									
(Czech Republic) Tomáš Berdych	2007–13	8	1–7	13%	1–4	0–1	0–2	–	Lost (3–6, 2–6) at 2013 Cincinnati 2R
(Sweden) Jonas Björkman	2000	1	0–1	0%	0–1	–	–	–	Lost (4–6, 7–5, 3–6) at 2000 Stockholm 1R
(United States) James Blake	2003–11	8	2–6	25%	2–6	–	–	–	Won (7–6^{(7–5)}, 5–7, 6–2) at 2011 Stockholm SF
(Sweden) Thomas Enqvist	2001	1	1–0	100%	1–0	–	–	–	Won (7–6^{(7–4)}, 6–3) at 2001 Stockholm SF
(France) Sébastien Grosjean	2002–06	2	1–1	50%	0–1	–	1–0	–	Won (6–2, 6–1) at 2006 Rome 1R
(United Kingdom) Tim Henman	2005	1	0–1	0%	–	0–1	–	–	Lost (6–3, 7–6^{(7–5)}, 4–6, 5–7, 2–6) at **2005 Wimbledon 1R**
(Japan) **Kei Nishikori**	2014	1	0–1	0%	0–1	–	–	–	Lost (3–6, 6–4, 2–6) at 2014 Kuala Lumpur SF
(Germany) Nicolas Kiefer	2008	1	0–1	0%	0–1	–	–	–	Lost (3–6, 2–6) at 2008 Miami 2R
(Netherlands) Richard Krajicek	2002–03	2	2–0	100%	1–0	–	–	1–0	Won (7–6^{(9–7)}, 7–5) at 2003 Milan QF
(United States) Todd Martin	2002–04	2	0–2	0%	0–2	–	–	–	Lost (3–6, 7–5, 5–7) at 2004 Miami 2R
(United Kingdom) Greg Rusedski	2003–06	2	1–1	50%	1–0	0–1	–	–	Won (7–6^{(7–2)}, 6–4) at 2006 New Haven 2R
(Sweden) Robin Söderling	2008	1	0–1	0%	0–1	–	–	–	Lost (3–6, 7–5, 5–7) at 2008 Marseille 1R
Number 5 ranked players									
(South Africa) Kevin Anderson	2008–13	4	0–4	0%	0–4	–	–	–	Lost (3–6, 1–6) at 2013 Indian Wells 3R
(Argentina) Gastón Gaudio	2002–03	3	0–3	0%	0–1	–	0–2	–	Lost (6–3, 5–7, 2–6) at 2003 Madrid 1R
(Chile) Fernando González	2003–08	6	1–5	17%	1–2	–	0–3	–	Lost (5–7, 4–6, 7–6^{(7–3)}, 1–6) at **2008 US Open 3R**
(Czech Republic) Jiří Novák	2005	1	1–0	100%	–	–	1–0	–	Won (2–6, 6–2, 7–6^{(10–8)}) at 2005 Stuttgart 3R
(Spain) **Tommy Robredo**	2002–12	8	1–7	13%	1–4	–	0–2	0–1	Lost (2–6, 4–6) at 2012 Tokyo 1R
(Russia) **Andrey Rublev**	2015	1	0–1	0%	–	–	0–1	–	Lost (3–6, 7–6^{(7–4)}, 6–7^{(4–7)}) at 2015 Geneva 1R
(Germany) Rainer Schüttler	2002–09	9	5–4	56%	3–4	–	2–0	–	Lost (6–4, 2–6, 3–6) at 2009 Miami 2R
(France) **Jo-Wilfried Tsonga**	2008–15	8	2–6	25%	2–5	–	0–1	–	Lost (3–6, 1–6, 1–6) at **2015 US Open 1R**
Number 6 ranked players									
(Spain) Albert Costa	2004	1	1–0	100%	1–0	–	–	–	Won (6–2, 6–1) at 2004 Rotterdam 2R
(Slovakia) Karol Kučera	2003–05	2	2–0	100%	2–0	–	–	–	Won (6–1, 3–1 ret.) at 2005 Bangkok 1R
(Ecuador) Nicolás Lapentti	2002	1	1–0	100%	–	–	1–0	–	Won (6–3, 6–4, 7–6^{(7–5)}) at **2002 French Open 1R**
(France) **Gaël Monfils**	2011–14	4	0–4	0%	0–4	–	–	–	Lost (2–6, 6–3, 1–6) at 2014 Montpellier SF
(France) Gilles Simon	2006–13	5	2–3	40%	1–1	–	1–2	–	Lost (6–4, 4–6, 4–6) at 2013 Bucharest 2R
Number 7 ranked players									
(Croatia) Mario Ančić	2005–06	3	3–0	100%	2–0	–	1–0	–	Won (7–5, 7–6^{(7–5)}) at 2006 Rotterdam 1R
(United States) Mardy Fish	2008–13	2	2–0	100%	2–0	–	–	–	Won (7–5, 6–7^{(3–7)}, 3–2 ret.) at 2013 Winston-Salem 2R
(France) **Richard Gasquet**	2006–13	6	1–5	17%	1–5	–	–	–	Lost (3–6, 6–3, 2–6) at 2013 Montpellier SF
(Belgium) **David Goffin**	2013–14	2	1–1	50%	1–1	–	–	–	Lost (4–6, 6–4, 4–6) at 2014 Winston-Salem 3R
(Sweden) Thomas Johansson	2001–08	3	1–2	33%	1–2	–	–	–	Lost (6–4, 4–6, 4–6) at 2008 Summer Olympics 1R
(Spain) **Fernando Verdasco**	2003–14	8	3–5	38%	2–5	1–0	–	–	Lost (3–6, 4–6) at 2014 Stockholm 2R
Number 8 ranked players									
(Cyprus) Marcos Baghdatis	2006–09	6	3–3	50%	3–2	–	0–1	–	Lost (5–7, 3–6, 6–3, 4–6) at 2009 Davis Cup 3R
(Argentina) Guillermo Cañas	2007	1	1–0	100%	1–0	–	–	–	Won (6–4, 3–6, 7–5) at 2007 Basel 2R
(United States) **John Isner**	2007–14	5	0–5	0%	0–4	0–1	–	–	Lost (6–7^{(17–19)}, 6–7^{(3–7)}, 5–7) at **2014 Wimbledon 2R**
(Austria) Jürgen Melzer	2003–10	4	4–0	100%	2–0	–	1–0	1–0	Won (6–3, 7–6^{(7–4)}) at 2010 Bangkok QF
(Australia) Mark Philippoussis	2006	1	1–0	100%	1–0	–	–	–	Won (6–4, 7–6^{(7–3)}) at 2006 Miami 2R
(Czech Republic) Radek Štěpánek	2003–12	8	4–4	50%	2–2	–	2–2	–	Won (6–3, 6–4, 7–6^{(7–5)}) at 2012 Monte Carlo 1R
(Serbia) Janko Tipsarević	2006	1	1–0	100%	–	–	–	1–0	Won (7–5, 6–2) at 2006 St. Petersburg 1R
(Russia) Mikhail Youzhny	2006–13	5	1–4	20%	1–2	0–1	–	0–1	Lost (5–7, 7–6^{(7–4)}, 4–6) at 2013 Valencia QF
Number 9 ranked players									
(Spain) Nicolás Almagro	2005–15	6	1–5	17%	0–2	0–1	1–2	–	Lost (6–3, 6–7^{(6–8)}, 4–6) at 2015 Stockholm 1R
(Spain) **Roberto Bautista Agut**	2013–14	2	1–1	50%	0–1	–	1–0	–	Lost (2–6, 6–4, 6–7^{(6–8)}) at 2014 Indian Wells 3R
(Italy) **Fabio Fognini**	2009–14	2	1–1	50%	1–1	–	–	–	Lost (5–7, 4–6, 6–3, 2–6) at **2014 Australian Open 2R**
(Sweden) Joachim Johansson	2006	1	1–0	100%	1–0	–	–	–	Won (7–6^{(10–8)}, 6–7^{(5–7)}, 6–3) at 2006 Stockholm SF
(Chile) Nicolás Massú	2004–06	4	3–1	75%	3–1	–	–	–	Lost (3–6, 4–6) at 2006 New Haven 3R
(Argentina) Mariano Puerta	2005	1	1–0	100%	–	–	1–0	–	Won (6–4, 7–6^{(7–1)}) at 2005 Sopot 1R
(Switzerland) Marc Rosset	2003	1	0–1	0%	–	0–1	–	–	Lost (5–7, 5–7) at 2003 London 2R
(Thailand) Paradorn Srichaphan	2002–06	5	3–2	60%	2–2	–	1–0	–	Lost (6–7^{(3–7)}, 6–3, 5–7) at 2006 Indian Wells QF
Number 10 ranked players									
(France) Arnaud Clément	2003–08	2	2–0	100%	2–0	–	–	–	Won (6–4, 6–7^{(5–7)}, 6–2) at 2008 Stockholm 2R
(Latvia) **Ernests Gulbis**	2008–13	5	0–5	0%	0–3	–	0–2	–	Lost (2–6, 6–7^{(6–8)}) at 2013 Rome 1R
(Argentina) Juan Mónaco	2006–15	7	3–4	43%	3–0	–	0–4	–	Lost (1–6, 6–7^{(4–7)}) at 2015 Rio de Janeiro 2R
**Total**	**2000–15**	**291**	**96–195**	**33%**	**67–125** **(35%)**	**2–14** **(13%)**	**23–51** **(31%)**	**4–5** **(44%)**	*** Statistics correct as of 2 May 2022.**

== Top 10 wins ==
=== Singles ===
- He has a 11–77 record against players who were, at the time the match was played, ranked in the top 10.

Type	2000	2001	2002	2003	2004	2005	2006	2007	2008	2009	2010	2011	2012	2013	2014	2015	Total
Wins	0	0	1	2	1	1	0	2	0	1	1	1	0	1	0	0	11

#	Player	Rank	Event	Surface	Rd	Score	JNR
2002
1.	(Russia) Marat Safin	7	Estoril, Portugal	Clay	QF	4–6, 7–5, 6–3	66
2003
2.	(Thailand) Paradorn Srichaphan	10	Rome, Italy	Clay	1R	6–1, 6–2	35
3.	(Spain) Carlos Moyá	6	Bangkok, Thailand	Hard (i)	QF	6–7^{(5–7)}, 6–4, 6–4	37
2004
4.	(Argentina) David Nalbandian	8	Dubai, United Arab Emirates	Hard	1R	6–3, 6–4	34
2005
5.	(United States) Andre Agassi	7	French Open, Paris, France	Clay	1R	7–5, 4–6, 6–7^{(6–8)}, 6–1, 6–0	95
2007
6.	(Spain) Tommy Robredo	7	Cincinnati, United States	Hard	2R	6–4, 6–1	28
7.	(Chile) Fernando González	8	Basel, Switzerland	Hard (i)	QF	6–3, 7–5	29
2009
-	(France) Jo-Wilfried Tsonga	6	Sydney, Australia	Hard	QF	Walkover	40
8.	(Serbia) Novak Djokovic	3	Sydney, Australia	Hard	SF	6–4, 7–6^{(7–3)}	40
2010
9.	(Czech Republic) Tomáš Berdych	6	Stockholm, Sweden	Hard (i)	2R	6–1, 6–4	45
2011
10.	(Spain) David Ferrer	6	Rotterdam, Netherlands	Hard (i)	1R	6–3, 6–4	43
2013
11.	(Argentina) Juan Martín del Potro	7	Monte Carlo, Monaco	Clay	3R	6–4, 4–6, 7–6^{(7–4)}	49

=== Doubles ===
- He has a 12–41 record against players who were, at the time the match was played, ranked in the top 10.

Type	2003	2004	2005	2006	2007	2008	2009	2010	2011	2012	2013	Total
Wins	1	0	0	0	3	3	1	1	1	1	1	12

#	Opponents	Rank	Event	Surface	Rd	Score	Partner	JNR
2003
1.	(Russia) Yevgeny Kafelnikov (Germany) David Prinosil	9; 41	Munich, Germany	Clay	QF	6–1 ret.	(Thailand) Paradorn Srichaphan	120
2007
2.	(United States) Bob Bryan (United States) Mike Bryan	3; 3	Indian Wells, United States	Hard	1R	6–4, 6–4	(Sweden) Robert Lindstedt	73
3.	(France) Fabrice Santoro (Serbia) Nenad Zimonjić	11; 9	Monte-Carlo, Monaco	Clay	2R	3–6, 6–0, [10–8]	(Romania) Andrei Pavel	66
4.	(Sweden) Jonas Björkman (Belarus) Max Mirnyi	4; 3	Wimbledon, London, United Kingdom	Grass	1R	2–6, 7–6^{(7–4)}, 7–5, 6–3	(Sweden) Robert Lindstedt	54
2008
5.	(Sweden) Simon Aspelin (Austria) Julian Knowle	8; 6	Australian Open, Australia	Hard	1R	6–4, 4–6, 6–2	(Sweden) Robert Lindstedt	46
6.	(Israel) Jonathan Erlich (Israel) Andy Ram	6; 6	Rome, Italy	Clay	2R	7–6^{(8–6)}, 6–3	(Australia) Jordan Kerr	61
7.	(Canada) Daniel Nestor (Serbia) Nenad Zimonjić	1; 4	US Open, New York, United States	Hard	3R	6–4, 6–7^{(11–13)}, 6–2	(Sweden) Robert Lindstedt	77
2009
8.	(United States) Bob Bryan (United States) Mike Bryan	1; 1	San Jose, United States	Hard (i)	QF	6–4, 4–6, [10–5]	(India) Rohan Bopanna	80
2010
9.	(India) Mahesh Bhupathi (Belarus) Max Mirnyi	7; 11	Australian Open, Australia	Hard	1R	6–4, 6–4	(Germany) Michael Kohlmann	128
2011
10.	(France) Michaël Llodra (Serbia) Nenad Zimonjić	18; 4	Rome, Italy	Clay	QF	6–4, 6–3	(Argentina) Carlos Berlocq	112
2012
11.	(Belarus) Max Mirnyi (Canada) Daniel Nestor	3; 3	Sydney, Australia	Hard	QF	0–6, 6–4, [10–4]	(Australia) Matthew Ebden	156
2013
12.	(Spain) Marcel Granollers (Spain) Marc López	7; 6	Valencia, Spain	Hard (i)	1R	6–2, 3–6, [10–6]	(Russia) Dmitry Tursunov	116

== Records ==
- These records were attained in the Open Era of tennis.

Tournament	Year	Record accomplished	Player tied
Sony Open Tennis	2014	Won the shortest recorded tennis match in Open Era history (28m20s)	Stands alone
