= Jonas Fröberg =

Swedish tennis player

- Country (sports): Sweden
- Residence: Tyresö, Sweden
- Born: 11 April 1981 (age 44)
- Plays: Right-handed
- Prize money: $21,037

Singles
- Career record: 1–1
- Highest ranking: No. 476 (19 Feb 2001)

Doubles
- Career record: 0–1
- Highest ranking: No. 740 (29 Oct 2001)

Jonas Fröberg (born 11 April 1981) is a former tennis player from Sweden.

== Tennis career ==
Fröberg participated at the Junior French Open, the Junior Wimbledon Championship and the Junior US Open in 1999.

Fröberg made his ATP main draw singles debut as a wild card at the 2000 Stockholm Open. He defeated Byron Black in the first round and then lost to Yevgeny Kafelnikov in the second round. Fröberg mainly participated on the ATP Challenger Tour and the Futures circuit.

In 2000, Fröberg, along with Jacob Adaktusson and Daniel Norberg, represented Sweden at the European Men's Team Championships (formerly known as the King's Cup).
