= Johan Örtegren =

Swedish tennis player

- Country (sports): Sweden
- Residence: Stockholm, Sweden
- Born: 22 March 1978 (age 47); Sweden
- Plays: Right-handed
- Prize money: $57,399

Singles
- Career record: 1–2
- Career titles: 0; 3 ITF
- Highest ranking: No. 295 (6 Aug 2001)

Grand Slam singles results
- Australian Open: Q1 (2001)
- Wimbledon: Q3 (2001)

Doubles
- Career titles: 0; 2 ITF
- Highest ranking: No. 479 (29 Jan 2001)

Johan Örtegren (born 22 March 1978) is a former professional tennis player from Sweden.

== Career ==
Örtegren made his ATP singles main draw debut at the 1999 Swedish Open as a qualifier, losing to world number 52 and fifth seed Christian Ruud of Norway in the first round. He also qualified for the 2000 Stockholm Open and after beating Fredrik Jonsson he lost to Sebastien Grosjean, the tournament sixth seed and world number 20, in the second round. He has the dubious honour of losing a match 6–0, 6–0, 6–0 when he was beaten by Todd Woodbridge at the 2001 Wimbledon qualifying tournament.

Örtegren played mostly on the Futures circuit reaching five finals and winning three titles. He also won two ITF doubles titles. Örtegren has a career high ATP singles ranking of 295 achieved on 6 August 2001. He also has a career high ATP doubles ranking of 479 achieved on 29 January 2001.

After his retirement as a professional player, Örtegren took up coaching. He also joined the coaching staff at the Good to Great Tennis Academy in Sweden, which is run by ex-touring pros Magnus Norman, Nicklas Kulti, and Mikael Tillström. As a coach he assisted touring pros such as Grigor Dimitrov and Laura Robson.

== ITF Futures Titles ==
=== Singles: (3) ===
No.	Year	Tournament	Surface	Opponent	Score
1.	1998	Vilnius, Lithuania F1	Carpet	(Germany) Alexander Gietl	6–3, 6–1
2.	1999	Oula, Finland F1	Clay	(Sweden) Björn Rehnquist	6–4, 4–6, 6–3
3.	2000	Pärnu Estonia F1	Clay	(Finland) Tommi Lenho	6–4, 7–5

=== Doubles: (2) ===
No.	Year	Tournament	Surface	Partner	Opponents	Score
1.	2000	Negril, Jamaica F3	Hard	(Sweden) Johan Kareld	(Cuba) Sandor Martínez-Breijo (Cuba) Lázaro Navarro-Batles	7–5, 6–2
2.	2008	Meshref, Kuwait F1	Hard	(Kuwait) Mohammad Ghareeb	(India) Rohan Gajjar (United Kingdom) Ken Skupski	6–4, 3–6, [10–7]
