= 1999 Wimbledon Championships – Girls' doubles =

Girls' doubles
- 1999 Wimbledon Championships

Final
- Champions: (Czech Republic) Dája Bedáňová (Argentina) María Emilia Salerni
- Runners-up: (Ukraine) Tatiana Perebiynis (Uzbekistan) Iroda Tulyaganova
- Score: 6–1, 2–6, 6–2

Events
Singles	men	women		boys	girls
Doubles	men	women	mixed	boys	girls
WC Singles	men	women	quad
WC Doubles	men	women	quad
Legends	men	women	seniors
← 1998 ·	Wimbledon Championships	· 2000 →

Eva Dyrberg and Jelena Kostanić were the defending champions, but they did not compete in the Junior's this year.

Dája Bedáňová and María Emilia Salerni defeated Tatiana Perebiynis and Iroda Tulyaganova in the final, 6–1, 2–6, 6–2 to win the girls' doubles tennis title at the 1999 Wimbledon Championships.

== Seeds ==
1. (Italy) Flavia Pennetta / (Italy) Roberta Vinci (semifinals)
2. (Czech Republic) Dája Bedáňová / (Argentina) María Emilia Salerni (champions)
3. (Argentina) Erica Krauth / (Argentina) Vanessa Krauth (second round)
4. (Hungary) Anikó Kapros / (South Africa) Aniela Mojzis (second round)
5. (South Africa) Natalie Grandin / (South Africa) Nicole Rencken (quarterfinals)
6. (United States) Ansley Cargill / (United States) Laura Granville (semifinals)
7. (Ukraine) Tatiana Perebiynis / (Uzbekistan) Iroda Tulyaganova (final)
8. (Slovenia) Nives Ćulum / (Australia) Sarah Stone (second round)

== Draw ==
=== Key ===
- Q = Qualifier
- WC = Wild card
- LL = Lucky loser
- Alt = Alternate
- SE = Special exempt
- PR = Protected ranking
- ITF = ITF entry
- JE = Junior exempt
- w/o = Walkover
- r = Retired
- d = Defaulted
- SR = Special ranking

=== Finals ===
Semifinals
1	(Italy) Flavia Pennetta (Italy) Roberta Vinci	3	4
7	(Ukraine) Tatiana Perebiynis (Uzbekistan) Iroda Tulyaganova	6	6
6	(United States) Ansley Cargill (United States) Laura Granville	7	0	1
2	(Czech Republic) Dája Bedáňová (Argentina) María Emilia Salerni	6	6	6

Final
7	(Ukraine) Tatiana Perebiynis (Uzbekistan) Iroda Tulyaganova	1	6	2
2	(Czech Republic) Dája Bedáňová (Argentina) María Emilia Salerni	6	2	6

=== Top half ===
First round
(Australia) Monique Adamczak (Australia) Melissa Dowse	6	6
(United Kingdom) Elena Baltacha (United Kingdom) Claire Seal	3	1
(United Kingdom) Ruth Barnes (United Kingdom) Anne Keothavong	0	2
(Russia) Galina Fokina (Russia) Lina Krasnoroutskaya	6	6
(United Kingdom) Anna Hawkins (United Kingdom) Emily Webley-Smith	4	1
8	(Slovenia) Nives Ćulum (Australia) Sarah Stone	6	6
3	(Argentina) Erica Krauth (Argentina) Vanessa Krauth	4	6	6
(Czech Republic) Iveta Benešová (Czech Republic) Eva Birnerová	6	3	2
(New Zealand) Leanne Baker (Hungary) Kinga Berecz	6	6
(United Kingdom) Heidi Farr (United Kingdom) Sarah Gregg	0	2
(Canada) Kavita Krishnamurthy (Mexico) Dominique Reynolds	1	3
(Switzerland) Laura Bao (Switzerland) Caecilia Charbonnier	6	6
(United Kingdom) Julia Smith (United Kingdom) Katherine Vymetal	6	1	6
7	(Ukraine) Tatiana Perebiynis (Uzbekistan) Iroda Tulyaganova	4	6	8

Second round
1	(Italy) F Pennetta (Italy) R Vinci	2	6	6
(Australia) M Adamczak (Australia) M Dowse	6	2	4
(Russia) G Fokina (Russia) L Krasnoroutskaya	6	6
8	(Slovenia) N Ćulum (Australia) S Stone	4	3
3	(Argentina) E Krauth (Argentina) V Krauth	6	0
(New Zealand) L Baker (Hungary) K Berecz	7	6
(Switzerland) L Bao (Switzerland) C Charbonnier	1	6	2
7	(Ukraine) T Perebiynis (Uzbekistan) I Tulyaganova	6	4	6

Quarterfinals
1	(Italy) F Pennetta (Italy) R Vinci	7	6
(Russia) G Fokina (Russia) L Krasnoroutskaya	5	4
(New Zealand) L Baker (Hungary) K Berecz	3	4
7	(Ukraine) T Perebiynis (Uzbekistan) I Tulyaganova	6	6

Semifinals
1	(Italy) F Pennetta (Italy) R Vinci	3	4
7	(Ukraine) T Perebiynis (Uzbekistan) I Tulyaganova	6	6

=== Bottom half ===
First round
6	(United States) Ansley Cargill (United States) Laura Granville	7	6
(Slovakia) Lenka Dlhopolcová (Slovakia) Ľubomíra Kurhajcová	5	4
(Slovakia) Martina Babáková (Chile) Valentina Castro	6	6
(United States) Laura Barnikow (United States) Julia Scaringe	3	4
(Russia) Elena Bovina (Netherlands) Michelle Gerards	6	6
(United Kingdom) Charlotte Wallace (United Kingdom) Lucy Wood	2	4
(Poland) Agnieszka Abram (Austria) Bettina Resch	w/o
4	(Hungary) Anikó Kapros (South Africa) Aniela Mojzis
5	(South Africa) Natalie Grandin (South Africa) Nicole Rencken	6	6
(Czech Republic) Dominika Luzarová (Australia) Samantha Stosur	4	2
(Madagascar) Aina Rafolomanantsiatosik (Mexico) Zerene Reyes	7	4	3
(United Kingdom) Alice Barnes (United Kingdom) Nicola Trinder	6	6	6
(Japan) Kaori Aoyama (Japan) Remi Uda	6	3	6
(Croatia) Ivana Abramović (Croatia) Dora Krstulović	3	6	3
(United Kingdom) Hannah Collin (Slovenia) Tina Hergold	6	7	3
2	(Czech Republic) Dája Bedáňová (Argentina) María Emilia Salerni	7	6	6

Second round
6	(United States) A Cargill (United States) L Granville	7	6
(Slovakia) M Babáková (Chile) V Castro	6	2
(Russia) E Bovina (Netherlands) M Gerards	6	6
4	(Hungary) A Kapros (South Africa) A Mojzis	2	3
5	(South Africa) N Grandin (South Africa) N Rencken	6	6
(United Kingdom) A Barnes (United Kingdom) N Trinder	2	1
(Japan) K Aoyama (Japan) R Uda	3	1
2	(Czech Republic) D Bedáňová (Argentina) ME Salerni	6	6

Quarterfinals
6	(United States) A Cargill (United States) L Granville	6	6
(Russia) E Bovina (Netherlands) M Gerards	2	1
5	(South Africa) N Grandin (South Africa) N Rencken	5	4
2	(Czech Republic) D Bedáňová (Argentina) ME Salerni	7	6

Semifinals
6	(United States) A Cargill (United States) L Granville	7	0	1
2	(Czech Republic) D Bedáňová (Argentina) ME Salerni	6	6	6
