= Alan Mackin =

Alan Mackin is the name of:

- Alan Mackin (footballer), Scottish footballer, father
- Alan Mackin (tennis), Scottish tennis player, son
