= 1999 Wimbledon Championships – Boys' doubles =

Boys' doubles
- 1999 Wimbledon Championships

Final
- Champions: (Argentina) Guillermo Coria (Argentina) David Nalbandian
- Runners-up: (Bulgaria) Todor Enev (Finland) Jarkko Nieminen
- Score: 7–5, 6–4

Events
Singles	men	women		boys	girls
Doubles	men	women	mixed	boys	girls
WC Singles	men	women	quad
WC Doubles	men	women	quad
Legends	men	women	seniors
- Wimbledon Championships

Roger Federer and Olivier Rochus were the defending champions, but they did not compete in the Junior's this year.

Guillermo Coria and David Nalbandian defeated Todor Enev and Jarkko Nieminen in the final, 7–5, 6–4 to win the boys' doubles tennis title at the 1999 Wimbledon Championships.

== Seeds ==
1. (Argentina) Guillermo Coria / (Argentina) David Nalbandian (champions)
2. (Venezuela) José de Armas / (Mexico) Daniel Langre (semifinals)
3. (Austria) Jürgen Melzer / (Denmark) Kristian Pless (quarterfinals)
4. (France) Julien Benneteau / (France) Nicolas Mahut (quarterfinals)
5. (United Kingdom) Lee Childs / (United Kingdom) Simon Dickson (quarterfinals)
6. (Sweden) Joachim Johansson / (Croatia) Lovro Zovko (second round)
7. (Czech Republic) Ladislav Chramosta / (Czech Republic) Jakub Hašek (second round)
8. (United States) Todd Martin / (Netherlands Antilles) Jean-Julien Rojer (quarterfinals)

== Draw ==
Key

- Q = Qualifier
- WC = Wild card
- LL = Lucky loser
- Alt = Alternate
- ITF = ITF entry
- PR = Protected ranking
- SR = Special ranking
- SE = Special exempt
- JE = Junior exempt
- JR = Junior Accelerator Programme entrant
- CO = College Accelerator Programme entrant
- NG = Next Gen Accelerator Program entrant
- w/o = Walkover
- r = Retired
- d = Defaulted

=== Finals ===
Semifinals
1	(Argentina) Guillermo Coria (Argentina) David Nalbandian	3	7	17
(United Kingdom) Mark Hilton (United Kingdom) James Nelson	6	5	15
(Bulgaria) Todor Enev (Finland) Jarkko Nieminen	7	6
2	(Venezuela) José de Armas (Mexico) Daniel Langre	6	2

Final
1	(Argentina) Guillermo Coria (Argentina) David Nalbandian	7	6
(Bulgaria) Todor Enev (Finland) Jarkko Nieminen	5	4

=== Top half ===
First round
1	(Argentina) Guillermo Coria (Argentina) David Nalbandian	7	7
(United Kingdom) Jordan Gray (United Kingdom) Tom Higgins	5	6
(United Kingdom) Alan Mackin (United Kingdom) Matthew Trudgeon	6	6
(Brazil) Thiago Alves (Finland) Timo Nieminen	2	1
(United States) Levar Harper-Griffith (United States) Andy Roddick	7	6
(Romania) Cătălin-Ionuț Gârd (Croatia) Roko Karanušić	6	3
(United Kingdom) Richard Brooks (United Kingdom) Nick Greenhouse	4	2
5	(United Kingdom) Lee Childs (United Kingdom) Simon Dickson	6	6
4	(France) Julien Benneteau (France) Nicolas Mahut	6	4	10
(Argentina) Matias Ormaza de Paul (Argentina) Cristian Villagrán	0	6	8
(United Kingdom) Andrew Banks (United Kingdom) Benjamin Riby	7	6
(Federal Republic of Yugoslavia) Aleksandar Vlaški (South Africa) Brandon Weir-Smith	6	4
(United Kingdom) Mark Hilton (United Kingdom) James Nelson	7	6
(Jamaica) Ryan Russell (Hong Kong) Wayne Wong	6	3
(United States) Tres Davis (United States) Alberto Francis	6	4
6	(Sweden) Joachim Johansson (Croatia) Lovro Zovko	7	6

Second round
1	(Argentina) G Coria (Argentina) D Nalbandian	6	6
(United Kingdom) A Mackin (United Kingdom) M Trudgeon	3	4
(United States) L Harper-Griffith (United States) A Roddick	4	4
5	(United Kingdom) L Childs (United Kingdom) S Dickson	6	6
4	(France) J Benneteau (France) N Mahut	6	6
(United Kingdom) A Banks (United Kingdom) B Riby	1	3
(United Kingdom) M Hilton (United Kingdom) J Nelson	6	6
6	(Sweden) J Johansson (Croatia) L Zovko	4	4

Quarterfinals
1	(Argentina) G Coria (Argentina) D Nalbandian	7	6
5	(United Kingdom) L Childs (United Kingdom) S Dickson	6	4
4	(France) J Benneteau (France) N Mahut	6	6	1
(United Kingdom) M Hilton (United Kingdom) J Nelson	7	3	6

Semifinals
1	(Argentina) G Coria (Argentina) D Nalbandian	3	6	17
(United Kingdom) M Hilton (United Kingdom) J Nelson	6	5	15

=== Bottom half ===
First round
7	(Czech Republic) Ladislav Chramosta (Czech Republic) Jakub Hašek	6	6	6
(Netherlands) Fred Hemmes Jr. (Austria) Luben Pampoulov	7	4	2
(Switzerland) Michael Lammer (Belgium) Renaud Thys	3	1
(Bulgaria) Todor Enev (Finland) Jarkko Nieminen	6	6
(South Africa) Andrew Anderson (South Africa) Dirk Stegmann	6	6
(United Kingdom) Robert Green (United Kingdom) Mark Weaver	4	4
(United States) Steve Berke (Germany) Dirk Britzen	3	4
3	(Austria) Jürgen Melzer (Denmark) Kristian Pless	6	6
8	(United States) Todd Martin (Netherlands Antilles) Jean-Julien Rojer	7	6
(Slovakia) Karol Beck (Republic of Ireland) Stephen Nugent	6	2
(Croatia) Mario Ančić (Slovenia) Andrej Kračman	6	3	4
(Japan) Hayato Furukawa (Japan) Yasuo Miyazaki	4	6	6
(France) Jean-Christophe Faurel (France) Éric Prodon	6	1	1
(United States) Alex Bogomolov Jr. (United States) John Paul Fruttero	3	6	6
(Chile) Phillip Harboe (South Africa) Andrew McDade	4	3
2	(Venezuela) José de Armas (Mexico) Daniel Langre	6	6

Second round
7	(Czech Republic) L Chramosta (Czech Republic) J Hašek	4	2
(Bulgaria) T Enev (Finland) J Nieminen	6	6
(South Africa) A Anderson (South Africa) D Stegmann	4	2
3	(Austria) J Melzer (Denmark) K Pless	6	6
8	(United States) T Martin (Netherlands Antilles) J-J Rojer	4	6	9
(Japan) H Furukawa (Japan) Y Miyazaki	6	1	7
(United States) A Bogomolov Jr. (United States) J-P Fruttero	6	6
2	(Venezuela) J de Armas (Mexico) D Langre	7	7

Quarterfinals
(Bulgaria) T Enev (Finland) J Nieminen	7	7
3	(Austria) J Melzer (Denmark) K Pless	6	6
8	(United States) T Martin (Netherlands Antilles) J-J Rojer	1	5
2	(Venezuela) J de Armas (Mexico) D Langre	6	7

Semifinals
(Bulgaria) T Enev (Finland) J Nieminen	7	6
2	(Venezuela) J de Armas (Mexico) D Langre	6	2
