= 1999 Wimbledon Championships – Girls' singles =

Girls' singles
- 1999 Wimbledon Championships

Final
- Champion: (Uzbekistan) Iroda Tulyaganova
- Runner-up: (Russia) Lina Krasnoroutskaya
- Score: 7–6^{(7–3)}, 6–3

Details
- Draw: 64 (8 Q )
- Seeds: 16

Events
Singles	men	women		boys	girls
Doubles	men	women	mixed	boys	girls
WC Singles	men	women	quad
WC Doubles	men	women	quad
Legends	men	women	seniors
← 1998 ·	Wimbledon Championships	· 2000 →

Katarina Srebotnik was the defending champion but did not complete in the Juniors this year.

Iroda Tulyaganova defeated Lina Krasnoroutskaya in the final, 7–6^{(7–3)}, 6–3 to win the girls' singles tennis title at the 1999 Wimbledon Championships. As such, Tulyaganova became the first girl from Asia to win a singles Grand Slam.

== Seeds ==
1. n/a
2. n/a
3. (Hungary) Anikó Kapros (quarterfinals)
4. (Uzbekistan) Iroda Tulyaganova (champion)
5. (Greece) Eleni Daniilidou (quarterfinals)
6. (Argentina) María Emilia Salerni (second round)
7. (Russia) Lina Krasnoroutskaya (final)
8. (Czech Republic) Dája Bedáňová (semifinals)
9. (New Zealand) Leanne Baker (second round)
10. (Russia) Elena Bovina (third round)
11. (Switzerland) Laura Bao (second round)
12. (Germany) Scarlett Werner (third round)
13. (Croatia) Ivana Abramović (third round)
14. (Ukraine) Tatiana Perebiynis (semifinals)
15. (United States) Laura Granville (second round)
16. (United States) Ansley Cargill (third round)

Click on the seed number of a player to go to their draw section.

== Draw ==
=== Key ===
- Q = Qualifier
- WC = Wild card
- LL = Lucky loser
- Alt = Alternate
- SE = Special exempt
- PR = Protected ranking
- ITF = ITF entry
- JE = Junior exempt
- w/o = Walkover
- r = Retired
- d = Defaulted
- SR = Special ranking

=== Finals ===
Quarterfinals
14	(Ukraine) Tatiana Perebiynis	7	6
(Australia) Monique Adamczak	5	1
4	(Uzbekistan) Iroda Tulyaganova	6	6
5	(Greece) Eleni Daniilidou	0	3
8	(Czech Republic) Dája Bedáňová	6	6
3	(Hungary) Anikó Kapros	4	4
7	(Russia) Lina Krasnoroutskaya	6	6
(South Africa) Natalie Grandin	2	2

Semifinals
14	(Ukraine) Tatiana Perebiynis	4	1
4	(Uzbekistan) Iroda Tulyaganova	6	6
8	(Czech Republic) Dája Bedáňová	7	3	4
7	(Russia) Lina Krasnoroutskaya	5	6	6

Final
4	(Uzbekistan) Iroda Tulyaganova	7^{7}	6
7	(Russia) Lina Krasnoroutskaya	6^{3}	4

=== Top half ===
==== Section 1 ====
First round
LL	(Madagascar) Aina Rafolomanantsiatosik	2	0
(United Kingdom) Julia Smith	6	6
(Slovakia) Martina Babáková	6	6	7
Q	(Australia) Samantha Stosur	7	3	9
(Czech Republic) Eva Birnerová	6	7
(Hungary) Kinga Berecz	1	5
Q	(United States) Julia Scaringe	3	1
14	(Ukraine) Tatiana Perebiynis	6	6
13	(Croatia) Ivana Abramović	7	6
(United Kingdom) Heidi Farr	5	4
(United Kingdom) Alice Barnes	6	6
(Mexico) Dominique Reynolds	3	1
Q	(South Africa) Nicole Rencken	4	1
(Australia) Monique Adamczak	6	6
(Netherlands) Michelle Gerards	1	1
6	(Argentina) María Emilia Salerni	6	6

Second round
(United Kingdom) J Smith	2	4
Q	(Australia) S Stosur	6	6
(Czech Republic) E Birnerová	3	4
14	(Ukraine) T Perebiynis	6	6
13	(Croatia) I Abramović	7	6
(United Kingdom) A Barnes	6	3
(Australia) M Adamczak	4	6	6
6	(Argentina) ME Salerni	6	0	4

Third round
Q	(Australia) S Stosur	3	2
14	(Ukraine) T Perebiynis	6	6
13	(Croatia) I Abramović	3	4
(Australia) M Adamczak	6	6

Quarterfinals
14	(Ukraine) T Perebiynis	7	6
(Australia) M Adamczak	5	1

==== Section 2 ====
First round
4	(Uzbekistan) Iroda Tulyaganova	6	6
(United Kingdom) Claire Carter	3	4
(Germany) Caroline-Ann Basu	2	6	2
(United Kingdom) Katherine Vymetal	6	3	6
(Czech Republic) Iveta Benešová	6	6	3
(South Africa) Aniela Mojzis	7	3	6
(Russia) Galina Fokina	4	6	2
16	(United States) Ansley Cargill	6	2	6
11	(Switzerland) Laura Bao	6	6
(Italy) Maria Elena Camerin	3	0
(United Kingdom) Hannah Collin	6	6
(Argentina) Vanessa Krauth	3	1
Q	(Slovenia) Nives Ćulum	6	4	8
(Austria) Bettina Resch	2	6	6
(Slovenia) Tina Hergold	3	2
5	(Greece) Eleni Daniilidou	6	6

Second round
4	(Uzbekistan) I Tulyaganova	6	5	6
(United Kingdom) K Vymetal	4	7	1
(South Africa) A Mojzis	3	3
16	(United States) A Cargill	6	6
11	(Switzerland) L Bao	4	6
(United Kingdom) H Collin	6	7
Q	(Slovenia) N Ćulum	3	1
5	(Greece) E Daniilidou	6	6

Third round
4	(Uzbekistan) I Tulyaganova	3	6
16	(United States) A Cargill	6	7
(United Kingdom) H Collin	4	4
5	(Greece) E Daniilidou	6	6

Quarterfinals
4	(Uzbekistan) I Tulyaganova	6	6
5	(Greece) E Daniilidou	0	3

=== Bottom half ===
==== Section 3 ====
First round
8	(Czech Republic) Dája Bedáňová	6	6
(United Kingdom) Anne Keothavong	4	4
Q	(United Kingdom) Ruth Barnes	4	2
(Croatia) Dora Krstulović	6	6
(Slovakia) Ľubomíra Kurhajcová	6	6
(Chile) Valentina Castro	1	2
(Germany) Martina Müller	2	3
10	(Russia) Elena Bovina	6	6
9	(New Zealand) Leanne Baker	6	6
(Italy) Roberta Vinci	0	3
(Switzerland) Caecilia Charbonnier	6	6
(Australia) Melissa Dowse	4	0
(Mexico) Zerene Reyes	6	4	6
(United Kingdom) Claire Seal	4	6	8
(United Kingdom) Nicola Trinder	7	2	0
3	(Hungary) Anikó Kapros	5	6	6

Second round
8	(Czech Republic) D Bedáňová	6	6
(Croatia) D Krstulović	2	2
(Slovakia) Ľ Kurhajcová	5	2
10	(Russia) E Bovina	7	6
9	(New Zealand) L Baker	4	1
(Switzerland) C Charbonnier	6	6
(United Kingdom) C Seal	2	2
3	(Hungary) A Kapros	6	6

Third round
8	(Czech Republic) D Bedáňová	6	7
10	(Russia) E Bovina	4	6
(Switzerland) C Charbonnier	6	1
3	(Hungary) A Kapros	7	6

Quarterfinals
8	(Czech Republic) D Bedáňová	6	6
3	(Hungary) A Kapros	4	4

==== Section 4 ====
First round
7	(Russia) Lina Krasnoroutskaya	6	6
Q	(Belarus) Alessia Nikolaeva	3	1
(Japan) Kaori Aoyama	7	6
(Argentina) Erica Krauth	6	1
Q	(United States) Lauren Barnikow	5	3
(United Kingdom) Elena Baltacha	7	6
(Slovakia) Lenka Dlhopolcová	5	0
12	(Germany) Scarlett Werner	7	6
15	(United States) Laura Granville	6	1	6
(Canada) Kavita Krishnamurthy	2	6	2
(Czech Republic) Dominika Luzarová	2	6	1
(Italy) Flavia Pennetta	6	1	6
Q	(United Kingdom) Charlotte Wallace	7	6
(Poland) Agnieszka Abram	6	1
(South Africa) Natalie Grandin	6	6
LL	(Japan) Remi Uda	1	4

Second round
7	(Russia) L Krasnoroutskaya	7	6
(Japan) K Aoyama	6	1
(United Kingdom) E Baltacha	3	2
12	(Germany) S Werner	6	6
15	(United States) L Granville	4	4
(Italy) F Pennetta	6	6
Q	(United Kingdom) C Wallace	2	0
(South Africa) N Grandin	6	6

Third round
7	(Russia) L Krasnoroutskaya	6	6
12	(Germany) S Werner	4	3
(Italy) F Pennetta	5	4
(South Africa) N Grandin	7	6

Quarterfinals
7	(Russia) L Krasnoroutskaya	6	6
(South Africa) N Grandin	2	2
