= Nebojša Đorđević =

Serbian tennis player

- Country (sports): (Federal Republic of Yugoslavia) Yugoslavia
- Residence: Belgrade
- Born: 24 April 1973 (age 52); Pančevo, SFR Yugoslavia
- Height: 1.90 m (6 ft 3 in)
- Turned pro: 1990
- Retired: 2001
- Plays: Right-handed
- Prize money: US $128,135

Singles
- Career record: 0–4
- Career titles: 0
- Highest ranking: No. 489 (27 Nov 1995)

Doubles
- Career record: 16–40
- Career titles: 0; 6 Challenger
- Highest ranking: No. 81 (21 Jun 1999)

Grand Slam doubles results
- Australian Open: 2R (1997)
- French Open: 2R (1999)
- Wimbledon: 1R (1998, 1999)
- US Open: 1R (1997, 1998, 1999)

Mixed doubles

Grand Slam mixed doubles results
- Wimbledon: 1R (1999)

Team competitions
- Davis Cup: 7–11 (Sin. 2–6, Dbs. 5–5)

Nebojša Đorđević (Serbian Cyrillic: Небојша Ђорђевић, born 24 April 1973) is a former professional tennis player from Serbia, whose name is often spelled Nebojsa Djordjevic in English-language media.

== Career ==
Đorđević appeared regularly in the Davis Cup competition during the 1990s, first for Yugoslavia then for the team now known as Serbia. He won seven of the 18 rubbers that he played in, finishing with a 2/6 record in singles and 5/5 record in doubles.

Primarily a doubles player, Đorđević participated in the main draw of 11 Grand Slam tournaments, all in the men's doubles. He also played mixed doubles once, at the 1999 Wimbledon Championships, with Olga Lugina.

The Serbian teamed up with Macedonian player Aleksandar Kitinov in the 1997 Australian Open and the pair had a win over Jean-Philippe Fleurian and Nicolas Pereira. It was one of only two matches he won at the Grand Slam level. The other came in the 1999 French Open, where he and partner Gábor Köves upset the famed Woodbridge/Woodforde combination, who were the third seeds. Although Đorđević never made the second round at Wimbledon, he came close. In 1999, partnering countryman Nenad Zimonjić, Đorđević lost a five set opening round match to Piet Norval and Kevin Ullyett, 8–10 in the fifth set.

He and Libor Pimek were semi-finalists at the Romanian Open in 1998. This would be the furthest he would reach in an ATP Tour tournament. On the Challenger circuit, Djorđević won six doubles titles.

== Challenger finals ==
=== Doubles: 15 (6 titles, 9 runners-up) ===
Legend ATP Challenger Tour (6–9)	Finals by surface Hard (1–2) Clay (5–7) Grass (0–0)

Result	No.	Year	Tournament	Surface	Partner	Opponents	Score
Loss	0–1	Jul 1996	Newcastle, UK	Hard	(Switzerland) Lorenzo Manta	(United Kingdom) Andrew Foster (United Kingdom) Danny Sapsford	6–3, 1–6, 2–6
Win	1–1	Sep 1996	Budva, Montenegro	Clay	(North Macedonia) Aleksandar Kitinov	(Federal Republic of Yugoslavia) Dušan Vemić (Federal Republic of Yugoslavia) Nenad Zimonjić	6–3, 6–2
Win	2–1	Sep 1996	Skopje, North Macedonia	Clay	(North Macedonia) Aleksandar Kitinov	(Austria) Georg Blumauer (Portugal) Emanuel Couto	6–1, 6–1
Loss	2–2	Nov 1996	Andorra, Andorra	Hard	(North Macedonia) Aleksandar Kitinov	(Spain) Tomas Carbonell (Spain) Francisco Roig	2–6, 6–4, 1–6
Win	3–2	Nov 1996	Portorož, Slovenia	Hard	(North Macedonia) Aleksandar Kitinov	(Germany) Mathias Huning (Germany) Michael Kohlmann	7–5, 5–7, 6–3
Loss	3–3	Jun 1997	Braunschweig, Germany	Clay	(Mexico) Óscar Ortiz	(United States) Brandon Coupe (South Africa) Paul Rosner	4–6, 3–6
Win	4–3	Sep 1997	Budapest II, Hungary	Clay	(Federal Republic of Yugoslavia) Dušan Vemić	(Hungary) Kornél Bardóczky (Hungary) Miklos Jancso	6–1, 3–6, 6–4
Loss	4–4	Sep 1997	Skopje, North Macedonia	Clay	(Federal Republic of Yugoslavia) Dušan Vemić	(Austria) Thomas Buchmayer (Austria) Thomas Strengberger	4–6, 6–7
Loss	4–5	May 1998	Košice, Slovakia	Clay	(South Africa) Marcos Ondruska	(Czech Republic) Jiri Novak (Czech Republic) David Rikl	6–7, 4–6
Win	5–5	Jun 1998	Venice, Italy	Clay	(South Africa) Marcos Ondruska	(Italy) Massimo Bertolini (Netherlands) Sander Groen	1–6, 6–1, 6–2
Loss	5–6	Jul 1998	Newcastle, UK	Clay	(Federal Republic of Yugoslavia) Dušan Vemić	(South Africa) Jeff Coetzee (Netherlands) Edwin Kempes	6–1, 6–7, 2–6
Loss	5–7	Aug 1998	Graz, Austria	Clay	(South Africa) Lan Bale	(Romania) Dinu-Mihai Pescariu (Spain) Albert Portas	3–6, 4–6
Win	6–7	May 1999	Fürth, Germany	Clay	(South Africa) Marcos Ondruska	(Argentina) Diego del Río (Argentina) Martin Rodríguez	4–6, 6–3, 6–4
Loss	6–8	Jun 1999	Braunschweig, Germany	Clay	(Spain) Tomas Carbonell	(Spain) Albert Portas (Spain) German Puentes-Alcaniz	4–6, 7–6, 3–6
Loss	6–9	Sep 1999	Sofia, Bulgaria	Clay	(Federal Republic of Yugoslavia) Dušan Vemić	(Italy) Massimo Ardinghi (Italy) Davide Sanguinetti	4–6, 2–6
