= 1999 Wimbledon Championships – Boys' singles =

Boys' singles
- 1999 Wimbledon Championships

Final
- Champion: (Austria) Jürgen Melzer
- Runner-up: (Denmark) Kristian Pless
- Score: 7–6^{(9–7)}, 6–3

Details
- Draw: 64 (8Q)
- Seeds: 16

Events
Singles	men	women		boys	girls
Doubles	men	women	mixed	boys	girls
WC Singles	men	women	quad
WC Doubles	men	women	quad
Legends	men	women	seniors
← 1998 ·	Wimbledon Championships	· 2000 →

Roger Federer was the defending champion, but did not complete in the Juniors this year.

Jürgen Melzer defeated Kristian Pless in the final, 7–6^{(9–7)}, 6–3 to win the boys' singles tennis title at the 1999 Wimbledon Championships.

== Seeds ==
1. (Denmark) Kristian Pless (final)
2. (Argentina) David Nalbandian (semifinals, withdrew)
3. (Argentina) Guillermo Coria (semifinals)
4. (France) Éric Prodon (first round)
5. (Venezuela) José de Armas (quarterfinals)
6. (Finland) Jarkko Nieminen (first round)
7. (Brazil) Thiago Alves (first round)
8. (Croatia) Lovro Zovko (quarterfinals)
9. (Sweden) Joachim Johansson (second round)
10. (United States) Mardy Fish (third round, retired)
11. (United States) Andy Roddick (second round)
12. (Czech Republic) Ladislav Chramosta (first round)
13. (Netherlands Antilles) Jean-Julien Rojer (first round)
14. (France) Julien Benneteau (first round)
15. n/a
16. (Argentina) Cristian Villagrán (first round)

Click on the seed number of a player to go to their draw section.

== Draw ==
Key

- Q = Qualifier
- WC = Wild card
- LL = Lucky loser
- Alt = Alternate
- ITF = ITF entry
- PR = Protected ranking
- SR = Special ranking
- SE = Special exempt
- JE = Junior exempt
- JR = Junior Accelerator Programme entrant
- CO = College Accelerator Programme entrant
- NG = Next Gen Accelerator Program entrant
- w/o = Walkover
- r = Retired
- d = Defaulted

=== Finals ===
Quarterfinals
1	(Denmark) Kristian Pless	7	6	6
5	(Venezuela) José de Armas	6	7	1
3	(Argentina) Guillermo Coria	6	6
8	(Croatia) Lovro Zovko	3	3
(Austria) Jürgen Melzer	7	7
Q	(Slovenia) Andrej Kračman	6	6
(United Kingdom) Alan Mackin	4	6	5
2	(Argentina) David Nalbandian	6	4	7

Semifinals
1	(Denmark) Kristian Pless	6	6
3	(Argentina) Guillermo Coria	2	3
(Austria) Jürgen Melzer
2	(Argentina) David Nalbandian	w/o

Final
1	(Denmark) Kristian Pless	6^{7}	3
(Austria) Jürgen Melzer	7^{9}	6

=== Top half ===
==== Section 1 ====
First round
1	(Denmark) Kristian Pless	6	6
(Switzerland) Michael Lammer	3	3
LL	(Jamaica) Ryan Russell	2	4
(Croatia) Roko Karanušić	6	6
(United States) David Martin	6	2	3
(Finland) Timo Nieminen	4	6	6
(Belgium) Renaud Thys	7	5	9
14	(France) Julien Benneteau	6	7	7
16	(Argentina) Cristian Villagrán	7	6	3
(United Kingdom) Richard Brooks	6	7	6
(Germany) Denis Gremelmayr	4	6
(Republic of Ireland) Stephen Nugent	6	7
(Romania) Cătălin-Ionuț Gârd	7	6
(Czech Republic) Jakub Hašek	6	4
(South Africa) Dirk Stegmann	3	6
5	(Venezuela) José de Armas	6	7

Second round
1	(Denmark) K Pless	7	6
(Croatia) R Karanušić	6	3
(Finland) T Nieminen	6	6
(Belgium) R Thys	0	2
(United Kingdom) R Brooks	3	1
(Republic of Ireland) S Nugent	6	6
(Romania) C-I Gârd	2	6	3
5	(Venezuela) J de Armas	6	3	6

Third round
1	(Denmark) K Pless	6	7
(Finland) T Nieminen	4	6
(Republic of Ireland) S Nugent	4	3
5	(Venezuela) J de Armas	6	6

Quarterfinals
1	(Denmark) K Pless	7	6	6
5	(Venezuela) J de Armas	6	7	1

==== Section 2 ====
First round
3	(Argentina) Guillermo Coria	6	6
(United Kingdom) Nick Greenhouse	4	4
(Slovakia) Karol Beck	4	6	2
(Mexico) Daniel Langre	6	3	6
(United Kingdom) Matthew Trudgeon	7	7
(France) Jean-Christophe Faurel	5	6
(Hong Kong) Wayne Wong	4	3
11	(United States) Andy Roddick	6	6
9	(Sweden) Joachim Johansson	1	6	11
(Federal Republic of Yugoslavia) Aleksandar Vlaski	6	4	9
(Chile) Phillip Harboe	1	4
(United Kingdom) Simon Dickson	6	6
(Germany) Maximilian Abel	6	5	7
Q	(United States) Steve Berke	3	7	9
(United Kingdom) Benjamin Riby	2	4
8	(Croatia) Lovro Zovko	6	6

Second round
3	(Argentina) G Coria	6	6
(Mexico) D Langre	3	2
(United Kingdom) M Trudgeon	7	7
11	(United States) A Roddick	6	6
9	(Sweden) J Johansson	6	5	2
(United Kingdom) S Dickson	4	7	6
Q	(United States) S Berke	1	3
8	(Croatia) L Zovko	6	6

Third round
3	(Argentina) G Coria	6	6
(United Kingdom) M Trudgeon	1	1
(United Kingdom) S Dickson	3	6
8	(Croatia) L Zovko	6	7

Quarterfinals
3	(Argentina) G Coria	6	6
8	(Croatia) L Zovko	3	3

=== Bottom half ===
==== Section 3 ====
First round
6	(Finland) Jarkko Nieminen	7	4	3
(Austria) Jürgen Melzer	6	6	6
(United Kingdom) Mark Weaver	4	6
Q	(United States) Alex Bogomolov Jr.	6	7
Q	(Japan) Yasuo Miyazaki	6	3
(United Kingdom) James Nelson	7	6
(Germany) Philipp Hammer	3	1
10	(United States) Mardy Fish	6	6
12	(Czech Republic) Ladislav Chramosta	4	4
(United Kingdom) Mark Hilton	6	6
Q	(Slovenia) Andrej Kračman	7	6
(Argentina) Matias Ormaza de Paul	5	3
Q	(Sweden) Jonas Fröberg	6	6
Q	(Germany) Dirk Britzen	1	2
Q	(Austria) Luben Pampoulov	7	7
4	(France) Éric Prodon	5	6

Second round
(Austria) J Melzer	6	6
Q	(United States) A Bogomolov Jr.	1	4
(United Kingdom) J Nelson	4	7	4
10	(United States) M Fish	6	5	6
(United Kingdom) M Hilton	5	3
Q	(Slovenia) A Kračman	7	6
Q	(Sweden) J Fröberg	6	6
Q	(Austria) L Pampoulov	4	2

Third round
(Austria) J Melzer	6	4	3
10	(United States) M Fish	2	6	0^{r}
Q	(Slovenia) A Kračman	7	7
Q	(Sweden) J Fröberg	6	6

Quarterfinals
(Austria) J Melzer	7	7
Q	(Slovenia) A Kračman	6	6

==== Section 4 ====
First round
7	(Brazil) Thiago Alves	3	2
(United Kingdom) Alan Mackin	6	6
(Netherlands) Fred Hemmes Jr.	6	6
(South Africa) Andrew McDade	2	2
(United Kingdom) Andrew Banks	4	0
(France) Nicolas Mahut	6	6
(Japan) Hayato Furukawa	6	7
LL	(Germany) Benjamin Becker	3	6
13	(Netherlands Antilles) Jean-Julien Rojer	4	4
(United States) Levar Harper-Griffith	6	6
(Germany) Dominik Meffert	1	4
(United Kingdom) Lee Childs	6	6
(Croatia) Mario Ančić	4	6	6
Q	(Germany) Uli Kiendl	6	4	3
(Bulgaria) Todor Enev	4	5
2	(Argentina) David Nalbandian	6	7

Second round
(United Kingdom) A Mackin	6	7
(Netherlands) F Hemmes Jr.	1	6
(France) N Mahut	6	4	12
(Japan) H Furukawa	4	6	10
(United States) L Harper-Griffith	7	6
(United Kingdom) L Childs	6	3
(Croatia) M Ančić	4	4
2	(Argentina) D Nalbandian	6	6

Third round
(United Kingdom) A Mackin	6	1	6
(France) N Mahut	3	6	3
(United States) L Harper-Griffith	6	4	5
2	(Argentina) D Nalbandian	4	6	7

Quarterfinals
(United Kingdom) A Mackin	4	6	5
2	(Argentina) D Nalbandian	6	4	7
