= 1999 Wimbledon Championships – Women's doubles =

Women's doubles
- 1999 Wimbledon Championships

Final
- Champions: (United States) Lindsay Davenport (United States) Corina Morariu
- Runners-up: (South Africa) Mariaan de Swardt (Ukraine) Elena Tatarkova
- Score: 6–4, 6–4

Details
- Draw: 64 (2 Q / 4 WC )
- Seeds: 16

Events
Singles	men	women		boys	girls
Doubles	men	women	mixed	boys	girls
WC Singles	men	women	quad
WC Doubles	men	women	quad
Legends	men	women	seniors
← 1998 ·	Wimbledon Championships	· 2000 →

Lindsay Davenport and Corina Morariu defeated Mariaan de Swardt and Elena Tatarkova in the final, 6–4, 6–4 to win the ladies' doubles tennis title at the 1999 Wimbledon Championships.

Martina Hingis and Jana Novotná were the defending champions, but did not compete together. Hingis partnered with Anna Kournikova but withdrew before the tournament. Novotná competed with Natasha Zvereva, but lost in the semifinals to de Swardt and Tatarkova.

== Seeds ==
1. (Czech Republic) Jana Novotná / (Belarus) Natasha Zvereva (semifinals)
2. (Switzerland) Martina Hingis / (Russia) Anna Kournikova (withdrew)
3. (France) Alexandra Fusai / (France) Nathalie Tauziat (second round)
4. (United States) Serena Williams / (United States) Venus Williams (withdrew)
5. (Russia) Elena Likhovtseva / (Japan) Ai Sugiyama (second round)
6. (United States) Lisa Raymond / (Australia) Rennae Stubbs (third round)
7. (United States) Lindsay Davenport / (United States) Corina Morariu (champion)
8. (Latvia) Larisa Neiland / (Spain) Arantxa Sánchez Vicario (third round)
9. (South Africa) Mariaan de Swardt / (Ukraine) Elena Tatarkova (final)
10. (Romania) Irina Spîrlea / (Netherlands) Caroline Vis (third round)
11. (Spain) Conchita Martínez / (Argentina) Patricia Tarabini (second round)
12. (United States) Mary Joe Fernández / (United States) Monica Seles (quarterfinals)
13. (Belgium) Els Callens / (France) Julie Halard-Decugis (second round)
14. (Spain) Virginia Ruano Pascual / (Argentina) Paola Suárez (third round)
15. (Austria) Barbara Schett / (Switzerland) Patty Schnyder (first round)
16. (Zimbabwe) Cara Black / (Kazakhstan) Irina Selyutina (second round)
17. (Romania) Cătălina Cristea / (Romania) Ruxandra Dragomir (first round)
18. (United States) Debbie Graham / (United States) Lori McNeil (first round)

Click on the seed number of a player to go to their draw section.

== Draw ==
=== Key ===
- Q = Qualifier
- WC = Wild card
- LL = Lucky loser
- Alt = Alternate
- ITF = ITF entry
- PR = Protected ranking
- SR = Special ranking
- SE = Special exempt
- JE = Junior exempt
- JR = Junior Accelerator Programme entrant
- CO = College Accelerator Programme entrant
- NG = Next Gen Accelerator Program entrant
- w/o = Walkover
- r = Retired
- d = Defaulted

=== Finals ===
Quarterfinals
1	(Czech Republic) Jana Novotná (Belarus) Natasha Zvereva	6	7
(Italy) Silvia Farina (United States) Linda Wild	1	5
12	(United States) Mary Joe Fernández (United States) Monica Seles	7^{7}	1	4
9	(South Africa) Mariaan de Swardt (Ukraine) Elena Tatarkova	6^{3}	6	6
7	(United States) Lindsay Davenport (United States) Corina Morariu	6	7^{7}
(United States) Nicole Arendt (Netherlands) Manon Bollegraf	4	6^{1}
(South Africa) Liezel Horn (Slovenia) Katarina Srebotnik	6	1	17
(Netherlands) Kristie Boogert (France) Anne-Gaëlle Sidot	4	6	15

Semifinals
1	(Czech Republic) Jana Novotná (Belarus) Natasha Zvereva	4	6	5
9	(South Africa) Mariaan de Swardt (Ukraine) Elena Tatarkova	6	2	7
7	(United States) Lindsay Davenport (United States) Corina Morariu	7^{7}	6
(South Africa) Liezel Horn (Slovenia) Katarina Srebotnik	6^{0}	3

Final
9	(South Africa) Mariaan de Swardt (Ukraine) Elena Tatarkova	4	4
7	(United States) Lindsay Davenport (United States) Corina Morariu	6	6

=== Top half ===
==== Section 1 ====
First round
1	(Czech Republic) J Novotná (Belarus) N Zvereva	7	6^{2}	6
(France) A Dechaume-Balleret (France) S Testud	5	7^{7}	4
(South Africa) A Coetzer (Argentina) I Gorrochategui	6	6
(Ukraine) O Lugina (Croatia) M Murić	3	0
Q	(Germany) J Abe (Russia) N Petrova	6	6
(South Korea) E-h Kim (Japan) Y Yoshida	2	3
(Belgium) L Courtois (Australia) A Molik	6^{5}	7	6
15	(Austria) B Schett (Switzerland) P Schnyder	7^{7}	5	1
17	(Romania) C Cristea (Romania) R Dragomir	3	4
(Czech Republic) E Martincová (Spain) C Torrens Valero	6	6
(Czech Republic) K Hrdličková (Slovenia) T Križan	3^{r}
(Italy) S Farina (United States) L Wild	4
WC	(South Africa) S de Beer (United Kingdom) S Smith	1	4
(Australia) K Kunce (United States) K Po	6	6
(Spain) E Bes (Germany) K Freye	2	1
8	(Latvia) L Neiland (Spain) A Sánchez Vicario	6	6

Second round
1	(Czech Republic) J Novotná (Belarus) N Zvereva
(South Africa) A Coetzer (Argentina) I Gorrochategui	w/o
Q	(Germany) J Abe (Russia) N Petrova	3	6	5
(Belgium) L Courtois (Australia) A Molik	6	3	7
(Czech Republic) E Martincová (Spain) C Torrens Valero	4	3
(Italy) S Farina (United States) L Wild	6	6
(Australia) K Kunce (United States) K Po	2	3
8	(Latvia) L Neiland (Spain) A Sánchez Vicario	6	6

Third round
1	(Czech Republic) J Novotná (Belarus) N Zvereva	6	6
(Belgium) L Courtois (Australia) A Molik	4	0
(Italy) S Farina (United States) L Wild	6	7^{7}
8	(Latvia) L Neiland (Spain) A Sánchez Vicario	1	6^{2}

Quarterfinals
1	(Czech Republic) J Novotná (Belarus) N Zvereva	6	7
(Italy) S Farina (United States) L Wild	1	5

==== Section 2 ====
First round
5	(Russia) E Likhovtseva (Japan) A Sugiyama	6	6
(Belgium) S Appelmans (Netherlands) M Oremans	3	4
(Czech Republic) E Melicharová (Czech Republic) H Vildová	5	2
Q	(Australia) J Dokic (Slovenia) T Pisnik	7	6
(Belarus) O Barabanschikova (Germany) B Rittner	6	6
LL	(United States) S Reeves (United States) M Washington	3	3
LL	(Russia) A Jidkova (Paraguay) L Schaerer	1	2
12	(United States) MJ Fernández (United States) M Seles	6	6
14	(Spain) V Ruano Pascual (Argentina) P Suárez	6	6^{5}	6
(Brazil) V Menga (Germany) E Wagner	4	7^{7}	3
(Switzerland) E Gagliardi (Hungary) K Marosi	5	4
(France) A Cocheteux (France) É Loit	7	6
(Germany) W Probst (Germany) C Singer	6	6
(Argentina) L Montalvo (Chinese Taipei) S-t Wang	1	0
WC	(United Kingdom) J Pullin (United Kingdom) L Woodroffe	2	6	2
9	(South Africa) M de Swardt (Ukraine) E Tatarkova	6	2	6

Second round
5	(Russia) E Likhovtseva (Japan) A Sugiyama	6	2	10
Q	(Australia) J Dokic (Slovenia) T Pisnik	3	6	12
(Belarus) O Barabanschikova (Germany) B Rittner	1	0
12	(United States) MJ Fernández (United States) M Seles	6	6
14	(Spain) V Ruano Pascual (Argentina) P Suárez	7^{7}	3	6
(France) A Cocheteux (France) É Loit	6^{3}	6	1
(Germany) W Probst (Germany) C Singer	1	6^{3}
9	(South Africa) M de Swardt (Ukraine) E Tatarkova	6	7^{7}

Third round
Q	(Australia) J Dokic (Slovenia) T Pisnik	2	1
12	(United States) MJ Fernández (United States) M Seles	6	6
14	(Spain) V Ruano Pascual (Argentina) P Suárez	4	3
9	(South Africa) M de Swardt (Ukraine) E Tatarkova	6	6

Quarterfinals
12	(United States) MJ Fernández (United States) M Seles	7^{7}	1	4
9	(South Africa) M de Swardt (Ukraine) E Tatarkova	6^{3}	6	6

=== Bottom half ===
==== Section 3 ====
First round
7	(United States) L Davenport (United States) C Morariu	6	6
(Argentina) MF Landa (Germany) M Weingärtner	0	0
WC	(United Kingdom) H Crook (United Kingdom) V Davies	4	1
(Greece) C Papadáki (United States) M Shaughnessy	6	6
(Australia) B Stewart (Bulgaria) P Stoyanova	5	2
(United States) A Frazier (United States) K Schlukebir	7	6
(United States) K Adams (United States) C Rubin	3	2
13	(Belgium) E Callens (France) J Halard-Decugis	6	6
16	(Zimbabwe) C Black (Kazakhstan) I Selyutina	6	5	6
(Australia) A Ellwood (Australia) L McShea	3	7	3
(Argentina) F Labat (Belgium) D Van Roost	6	6
(United States) E deLone (Australia) N Pratt	1	2
(Sweden) Å Carlsson (Canada) S Jeyaseelan	6	3	4
(United States) N Arendt (Netherlands) M Bollegraf	3	6	6
WC	(United Kingdom) K Cross (United Kingdom) J Ward	5	6	0
3	(France) A Fusai (France) N Tauziat	7	3	6

Second round
7	(United States) L Davenport (United States) C Morariu	6	6
(Greece) C Papadáki (United States) M Shaughnessy	2	2
(United States) A Frazier (United States) K Schlukebir	1	6	6
13	(Belgium) E Callens (France) J Halard-Decugis	6	4	3
16	(Zimbabwe) C Black (Kazakhstan) I Selyutina	4	6	4
(Argentina) F Labat (Belgium) D Van Roost	6	2	6
(United States) N Arendt (Netherlands) M Bollegraf	6	6
3	(France) A Fusai (France) N Tauziat	3	2

Third round
7	(United States) L Davenport (United States) C Morariu	6	7
(United States) A Frazier (United States) K Schlukebir	2	5
(Argentina) F Labat (Belgium) D Van Roost	1	6	1
(United States) N Arendt (Netherlands) M Bollegraf	6	3	6

Quarterfinals
7	(United States) L Davenport (United States) C Morariu	6	7^{7}
(United States) N Arendt (Netherlands) M Bollegraf	4	6^{1}

==== Section 4 ====
First round
6	(United States) L Raymond (Australia) R Stubbs	7^{7}	4	6
(Australia) C Barclay (Australia) K-A Guse	6^{5}	6	3
(France) C Dhenin (Australia) L Pleming	1	7	12
(Canada) M Drake (South Africa) J Steck	6	5	10
(South Africa) L Horn (Slovenia) K Srebotnik	4	7^{7}	6
(Australia) R McQuillan (Japan) N Miyagi	6	6^{3}	2
(Czech Republic) L Němečková (Spain) A Ortuño	0	0
11	(Spain) C Martínez (Argentina) P Tarabini	6	6
10	(Romania) I Spîrlea (Netherlands) C Vis	6	6
(Italy) L Golarsa (Slovakia) J Husárová	4	2
(Slovakia) K Habšudová (Thailand) T Tanasugarn	5	6	6
(South Africa) N de Villiers (Japan) R Hiraki	7	1	3
(Italy) R Grande (Japan) M Saeki	4	3
(Poland) A Olsza (United States) L Osterloh	6	6
(Netherlands) K Boogert (France) A-G Sidot	6	6
18	(United States) D Graham (United States) L McNeil	4	3

Second round
6	(United States) L Raymond (Australia) R Stubbs	6	7
(France) C Dhenin (Australia) L Pleming	3	5
(South Africa) L Horn (Slovenia) K Srebotnik	3	6	7
11	(Spain) C Martínez (Argentina) P Tarabini	6	4	5
10	(Romania) I Spîrlea (Netherlands) C Vis	6	6
(Slovakia) K Habšudová (Thailand) T Tanasugarn	2	2
(Poland) A Olsza (United States) L Osterloh	4	3
(Netherlands) K Boogert (France) A-G Sidot	6	6

Third round
6	(United States) L Raymond (Australia) R Stubbs	4	2
(South Africa) L Horn (Slovenia) K Srebotnik	6	6
10	(Romania) I Spîrlea (Netherlands) C Vis	6^{2}	3
(Netherlands) K Boogert (France) A-G Sidot	7^{7}	6

Quarterfinals
(South Africa) L Horn (Slovenia) K Srebotnik	6	1	17
(Netherlands) K Boogert (France) A-G Sidot	4	6	15
