= 1999 Wimbledon Championships – Men's doubles =

Men's doubles
- 1999 Wimbledon Championships

Final
- Champions: (India) Mahesh Bhupathi (India) Leander Paes
- Runners-up: (Netherlands) Paul Haarhuis (United States) Jared Palmer
- Score: 6–7^{(10–12)}, 6–3, 6–4, 7–6^{(7–4)}

Details
- Draw: 64 (3 Q / 6 WC )
- Seeds: 16

Events
Singles	men	women		boys	girls
Doubles	men	women	mixed	boys	girls
WC Singles	men	women	quad
WC Doubles	men	women	quad
Legends	men	women	seniors
← 1998 ·	Wimbledon Championships	· 2000 →

Mahesh Bhupathi and Leander Paes defeated the defending champion Paul Haarhuis and his partner Jared Palmer in the final, 6–7^{(10–12)}, 6–3, 6–4, 7–6^{(7–4)}, to win the gentlemen's doubles title at the 1999 Wimbledon Championships.

Jacco Eltingh and Haarhuis were the reigning champions, but Eltingh did not compete.

== Seeds ==
1. (India) Mahesh Bhupathi / (India) Leander Paes (champions)
2. (Australia) Todd Woodbridge / (Australia) Mark Woodforde (quarterfinals)
3. (Sweden) Jonas Björkman / (Australia) Patrick Rafter (quarterfinals, retired)
4. (Zimbabwe) Wayne Black / (Australia) Sandon Stolle (quarterfinals)
5. (France) Olivier Delaître / (France) Fabrice Santoro (semifinals)
6. (The Bahamas) Mark Knowles / (Canada) Daniel Nestor (semifinals)
7. (South Africa) Ellis Ferreira / (United States) Rick Leach (second round)
8. (Netherlands) Paul Haarhuis / (United States) Jared Palmer (final)
9. (Canada) Sébastien Lareau / (United States) Alex O'Brien (quarterfinals)
10. (South Africa) David Adams / (South Africa) John-Laffnie de Jager (third round)
11. (Czech Republic) Martin Damm / (Czech Republic) Cyril Suk (first round)
12. (Australia) Wayne Arthurs / (Australia) Andrew Kratzmann (second round)
13. (Sweden) Nicklas Kulti / (Sweden) Mikael Tillström (first round)
14. (Germany) David Prinosil / (Czech Republic) Daniel Vacek (first round)
15. (South Africa) Piet Norval / (South Africa) Kevin Ullyett (third round)
16. (United States) Patrick Galbraith / (United States) Justin Gimelstob (third round)

Click on the seed number of a player to go to their draw section.

== Draw ==
=== Key ===
- Q = Qualifier
- WC = Wild card
- LL = Lucky loser
- Alt = Alternate
- ITF = ITF entry
- PR = Protected ranking
- SR = Special ranking
- SE = Special exempt
- JE = Junior exempt
- JR = Junior Accelerator Programme entrant
- CO = College Accelerator Programme entrant
- NG = Next Gen Accelerator Program entrant
- w/o = Walkover
- r = Retired
- d = Defaulted

=== Finals ===
Quarterfinals
1	(India) Mahesh Bhupathi (India) Leander Paes	3	4	7^{7}	6	6
9	(Canada) Sébastien Lareau (United States) Alex O'Brien	6	6	6^{5}	4	4
4	(Zimbabwe) Wayne Black (Australia) Sandon Stolle	7	4	2	5
5	(France) Olivier Delaître (France) Fabrice Santoro	5	6	6	7
6	(The Bahamas) Mark Knowles (Canada) Daniel Nestor
3	(Sweden) Jonas Björkman (Australia) Patrick Rafter	w/o
8	(Netherlands) Paul Haarhuis (United States) Jared Palmer	6	5	7^{9}	6
2	(Australia) Todd Woodbridge (Australia) Mark Woodforde	4	7	6^{7}	4

Semifinals
1	(India) Mahesh Bhupathi (India) Leander Paes	2	6	7^{7}	4	7
5	(France) Olivier Delaître (France) Fabrice Santoro	6	3	6^{5}	6	5
6	(The Bahamas) Mark Knowles (Canada) Daniel Nestor	6	5	6^{4}	6	6
8	(Netherlands) Paul Haarhuis (United States) Jared Palmer	3	7	7^{7}	4	8

Final
1	(India) Mahesh Bhupathi (India) Leander Paes	6^{10}	6	6	7^{7}
8	(Netherlands) Paul Haarhuis (United States) Jared Palmer	7^{12}	3	4	6^{4}

=== Top half ===
==== Section 1 ====
First round
1	(India) M Bhupathi (India) L Paes	6	6	7^{7}
(Netherlands) T Kempers (Germany) M Kohlmann	4	2	6^{3}
Q	(Canada) B Kokavec (Romania) G Trifu	6	6	7^{7}
(Spain) A Martín (Israel) E Ran	3	4	6^{5}
(United States) J Grabb (United States) D Johnson	6	7^{7}	7^{7}
(Australia) M Hill (Sweden) P Nyborg	4	6^{4}	6^{2}
(Italy) M Ardinghi (Spain) Á López Morón	0	2	4
16	(United States) P Galbraith (United States) J Gimelstob	6	6	6
9	(Canada) S Lareau (United States) A O'Brien	6	6	1	6
(Argentina) M Hood (Argentina) S Prieto	1	4	6	3
(Hungary) G Köves (Czech Republic) R Štěpánek	4	4^{r}
(United States) D Bowen (United States) M Sell	6	2
WC	(United Kingdom) L Childs (United Kingdom) S Dickson	3	5	6^{6}
(United States) B Bryan (United States) M Bryan	6	7	7^{8}
(United States) G Grant (United States) TJ Middleton	5	6^{5}	6^{1}
7	(South Africa) E Ferreira (United States) R Leach	7	7^{7}	7^{7}

Second round
1	(India) M Bhupathi (India) L Paes	7	7^{7}	6
Q	(Canada) B Kokavec (Romania) G Trifu	5	6^{3}	3
(United States) J Grabb (United States) D Johnson	6^{12}	7^{7}	3	2
16	(United States) P Galbraith (United States) J Gimelstob	7^{14}	6^{4}	6	6
9	(Canada) S Lareau (United States) A O'Brien	2	6	6	7^{7}
(United States) D Bowen (United States) M Sell	6	1	3	6^{3}
(United States) B Bryan (United States) M Bryan	6	5	7^{7}	6
7	(South Africa) E Ferreira (United States) R Leach	3	7	6^{3}	3

Third round
1	(India) M Bhupathi (India) L Paes	6	4	6	6
16	(United States) P Galbraith (United States) J Gimelstob	4	6	4	4
9	(Canada) S Lareau (United States) A O'Brien	4	6	6	4	10
(United States) B Bryan (United States) M Bryan	6	4	2	6	8

Quarterfinals
1	(India) M Bhupathi (India) L Paes	3	4	7^{7}	6	6
9	(Canada) S Lareau (United States) A O'Brien	6	6	6^{5}	4	4

==== Section 2 ====
First round
4	(Zimbabwe) W Black (Australia) S Stolle	6	6	6^{6}	6
(United States) S Humphries (United States) J Waite	4	4	7^{8}	1
(South Africa) N Godwin (United States) M Keil	3	4	6^{0}
Q	(Italy) M Navarra (Italy) S Pescosolido	6	6	7^{7}
WC	(United Kingdom) M Maclagan (United Kingdom) A Parmar	4	3	3
WC	(United Kingdom) B Cowan (South Africa) W Whitehouse	6	6	6
(United States) B MacPhie (United States) J Tarango	6	5	3	7^{7}	6
14	(Germany) D Prinosil (Czech Republic) D Vacek	4	7	6	6^{5}	4
11	(Czech Republic) M Damm (Czech Republic) C Suk	3	4	7^{7}	7	4
(Czech Republic) D Rikl (Netherlands) S Schalken	6	6	6^{2}	5	6
(United Kingdom) N Broad (South Africa) R Koenig	4	6	7	6
(United States) D Flach (Germany) M-K Goellner	6	3	5	4
(Australia) P Tramacchi (Czech Republic) P Vízner	4	6	7	6
Q	(Brazil) A Ferreira (Japan) G Motomura	6	4	5	3
(Spain) E Nicolás (Spain) G Puentes	1	3	1
5	(France) O Delaître (France) F Santoro	6	6	6

Second round
4	(Zimbabwe) W Black (Australia) S Stolle	7	6	6
Q	(Italy) M Navarra (Italy) S Pescosolido	5	3	3
WC	(United Kingdom) B Cowan (South Africa) W Whitehouse	6^{3}	6	7^{7}	7^{7}
(United States) B MacPhie (United States) J Tarango	7^{7}	3	6^{4}	6^{5}
(Czech Republic) D Rikl (Netherlands) S Schalken	4	6	7	2	3
(United Kingdom) N Broad (South Africa) R Koenig	6	4	5	6	6
(Australia) P Tramacchi (Czech Republic) P Vízner	4	6	3	6	3
5	(France) O Delaître (France) F Santoro	6	3	6	1	6

Third round
4	(Zimbabwe) W Black (Australia) S Stolle	6	7^{7}	6
WC	(United Kingdom) B Cowan (South Africa) W Whitehouse	4	6^{3}	3
(United Kingdom) N Broad (South Africa) R Koenig	4	6	4	5
5	(France) O Delaître (France) F Santoro	6	4	6	7

Quarterfinals
4	(Zimbabwe) W Black (Australia) S Stolle	7	4	2	5
5	(France) O Delaître (France) F Santoro	5	6	6	7

=== Bottom half ===
==== Section 3 ====
First round
6	(The Bahamas) M Knowles (Canada) D Nestor	6	7	6
(Portugal) N Marques (Belgium) T Vanhoudt	3	5	1
(Germany) K Braasch (South Africa) C Haggard	7^{7}	7	6
(Argentina) D del Río (Argentina) M Rodríguez	6^{2}	5	3
WC	(United Kingdom) D Sherwood (United Kingdom) T Spinks	2	1	7^{10}	6^{3}
(United States) R Reneberg (United States) J Stark	6	6	6^{8}	7^{7}
(Italy) M Bertolini (Italy) C Brandi	6	6^{6}	4	5
12	(Australia) W Arthurs (Australia) A Kratzmann	4	7^{8}	6	7
13	(Sweden) N Kulti (Sweden) M Tillström	6	3	6^{3}	7^{7}	4
WC	(Switzerland) R Federer (Australia) L Hewitt	4	6	7^{7}	6^{4}	6
(United States) B Coupe (The Bahamas) M Merklein	6	7^{7}	6
WC	(United Kingdom) D Sapsford (United Kingdom) C Wilkinson	3	6^{4}	3
(Argentina) P Albano (Spain) T Carbonell	7	4	7	5	8
(Zimbabwe) B Black (South Africa) W Ferreira	5	6	5	7	6
(South Africa) M Barnard (South Africa) B Haygarth	1	6	6	3	3
3	(Sweden) J Björkman (Australia) P Rafter	6	4	4	6	6

Second round
6	(The Bahamas) M Knowles (Canada) D Nestor	3	7^{7}	6	7
(Germany) K Braasch (South Africa) C Haggard	6	6^{5}	4	5
(United States) R Reneberg (United States) J Stark	6	7	3	4	7
12	(Australia) W Arthurs (Australia) A Kratzmann	3	5	6	6	5
WC	(Switzerland) R Federer (Australia) L Hewitt	6	7^{7}	6
(United States) B Coupe (The Bahamas) M Merklein	4	6^{1}	3
(Argentina) P Albano (Spain) T Carbonell	5	3	4
3	(Sweden) J Björkman (Australia) P Rafter	7	6	6

Third round
6	(The Bahamas) M Knowles (Canada) D Nestor	7^{9}	6	6
(United States) R Reneberg (United States) J Stark	6^{7}	3	4
WC	(Switzerland) R Federer (Australia) L Hewitt	6^{1}	7	6	6^{3}	4
3	(Sweden) J Björkman (Australia) P Rafter	7^{7}	5	3	7^{7}	6

Quarterfinals
6	(The Bahamas) M Knowles (Canada) D Nestor
3	(Sweden) J Björkman (Australia) P Rafter	w/o

==== Section 4 ====
First round
8	(Netherlands) P Haarhuis (United States) J Palmer	7	6	6
(New Zealand) J Greenhalgh (Australia) G Silcock	5	1	4
(Australia) A Florent (Australia) D Macpherson	7^{7}	4	6	6
(North Macedonia) A Kitinov (United States) F Montana	6^{4}	6	4	3
(Ecuador) N Lapentti (Spain) J Sánchez	6	7^{10}	6^{4}	6
(United States) D DiLucia (South Africa) P Rosner	3	6^{8}	7^{7}	2
LL	(Israel) A Hadad (South Africa) D Roberts	3	2	4
10	(South Africa) D Adams (South Africa) J-L de Jager	6	6	6
15	(South Africa) P Norval (South Africa) K Ullyett	4	6	6	3	10
(Federal Republic of Yugoslavia) N Đorđević (Federal Republic of Yugoslavia) N Zimonjić	6	1	3	6	8
(United States) P Goldstein (Mexico) D Roditi	4	4	3
(South Africa) L Bale (South Africa) G Stafford	6	6	6
(Brazil) G Kuerten (Brazil) J Oncins	6	4	4	6	12
(Russia) Y Kafelnikov (Belarus) M Mirnyi	2	6	6	2	14
(Spain) JI Carrasco (Spain) J Velasco	6^{5}	2	4
2	(Australia) T Woodbridge (Australia) M Woodforde	7^{7}	6	6

Second round
8	(Netherlands) P Haarhuis (United States) J Palmer	3	7^{8}	7^{7}	7^{7}
(Australia) A Florent (Australia) D Macpherson	6	6^{6}	6^{3}	6^{3}
(United States) D DiLucia (United States) P Rosner	3	2	4
10	(South Africa) D Adams (South Africa) J-L de Jager	6	6	6
15	(South Africa) P Norval (South Africa) K Ullyett	7	6^{7}	6	7^{7}
(South Africa) L Bale (South Africa) G Stafford	5	7^{9}	2	6^{4}
(Russia) Y Kafelnikov (Belarus) M Mirnyi	w/o
2	(Australia) T Woodbridge (Australia) M Woodforde

Third round
8	(Netherlands) P Haarhuis (United States) J Palmer	7^{7}	6	6
10	(South Africa) D Adams (South Africa) J-L de Jager	6^{3}	2	1
15	(South Africa) P Norval (South Africa) K Ullyett	6	4	3	3
2	(Australia) T Woodbridge (Australia) M Woodforde	4	6	6	6

Quarterfinals
8	(Netherlands) P Haarhuis (United States) J Palmer	6	5	7^{9}	6
2	(Australia) T Woodbridge (Australia) M Woodforde	4	7	6^{7}	4
