= Dreamscape Immersive =

American entertainment and technology company

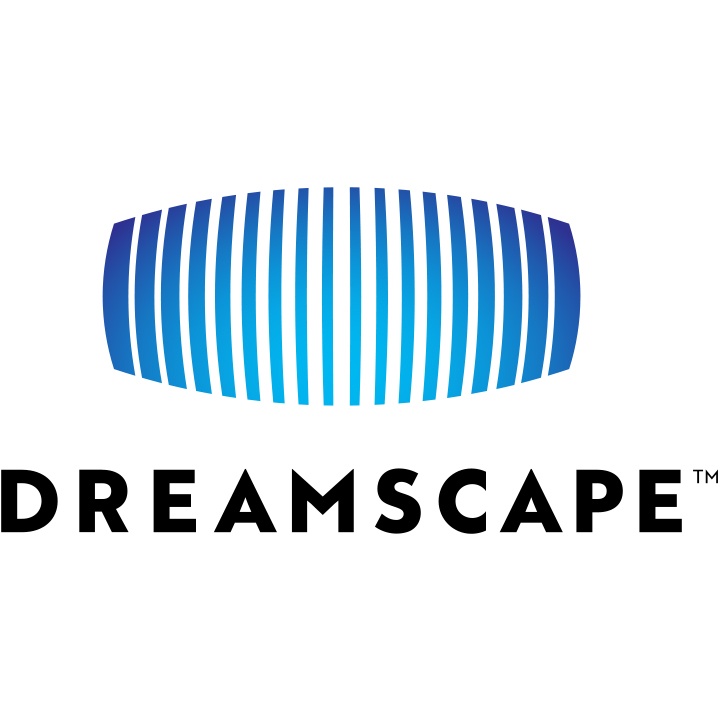
- Industry: Virtual reality
- Founded: 2016
- Founders: Kevin Wall (co-founder and co-chairman); Walter Parkes (co-founder and co-chairman); Caecilia Charbonnier (co-founder and CIO); Sylvain Chagué (co-founder and CTO); Ronald Menzel (co-founder and CSO)
- Headquarters: California, Culver City, United States
- Key people: Bruce Vaughn (CEO); Aaron Grosky (COO)
- Products: Free roam multi user virtual reality installations
- Members: 100
- Website: www.dreamscapeimmersive.com

Dreamscape Immersive is an American entertainment and technology company. It creates story-based full-roam virtual reality (VR) experiences which allow up to six people to simultaneously explore a virtual 3D environment, seeing fully rendered avatars of one another. Using real-time motion capture technology, full body mapping, virtual reality headsets, and real-life room-scale stage sets, it enables users to move untethered in a virtual environment and interact with physical objects. The technology was created by Caecilia Charbonnier and Sylvain Chagué, and developed by engineers at Artanim, a Swiss research center specialized in motion-capture technologies.

== History ==
Dreamscape Immersive was co-founded by Walter Parkes, a film producer; Kevin Wall, a global live events producer, investor, and entrepreneur; Caecilia Charbonnier and Sylvain Chagué, co-founders of Artanim; and Ronald Menzel, an entrepreneur.

The company was launched in mid-2016, whereupon Bruce Vaughn, the former head of Disney's Imagineering, was appointed CEO and Aaron Grosky, former president of Control Room, was appointed COO. It operated in stealth mode until February of the following year. Based in Culver City, California, its first investors included IMAX, Westfield Malls, three film studios, and Steven Spielberg. AMC Theatres, Nickelodeon, and Majid Al Futtaim later invested in the company.

Dreamscape Immersive's first VR installation, Alien Zoo, opened at the Atrium in the Westfield Century City Mall in Los Angeles in February 2018. It was followed by The Blu: Deep Rescue, developed in partnership with TheBlu, and Curse of the Lost Pearl: A Magic Projector Adventure. DreamWorks' Dragons Flight Academy VR was released in December 2019. A Men in Black VR experience was announced in June 2019 and released in 2021.

After opening its flagship store in Los Angeles, Dreamscape Immersive opened its second permanent location August 2019 in Dallas's Northpark Mall. This location closed January 2023. Dreamscape Immersive then partnered with Majid Al Futtaim, opening its first international location January 2020 at Mall of the Emirates in Dubai. It quietly closed June 2023. Its third US location, in Columbus, Ohio, opened in February 2020 and closed in May 2023. In July 2021, Dreamscape Immersive partnered with Warner Media to open two experiences within the Harry Potter New York Storefront in New York City’s Flatiron District. After 18 months, both attractions had closed. A fourth US location was opened in Garden State Plaza in Paramus, NJ. That location opened in December 2021 and closed in May 2023. Dreamscape Immersive opened its first European location in Confédération Centre in Geneva, Switzerland, in July 2022. The location closed in December 2025. In September 2022 they once again partnered with Majid Al Futtaim to open a location in Riyadh Park Mall, Saudi Arabia. On March 11, 2024, the Los Angeles location closed and was replaced with Player One VR World. Dreamscape Immersive currently operates one location in Saudi Arabia.
