= List of Switzerland Fed Cup team representatives =

This is a list of tennis players who have represented the Switzerland Fed Cup team in an official Fed Cup match. Switzerland have taken part in the competition since 1963.

== Players ==
Player	W-L (Total)	W-L (Singles)	W-L (Doubles)	Ties	Debut
Timea Bacsinszky	28 – 22	20 – 17	8 – 5	26	2004
Laura Bao	0 – 1	-	0 – 1	1	1999
Csilla Bartos-Cserepy	3 – 2	3 – 1	0 – 1	4	1990
Belinda Bencic	11 – 6	7 – 4	4 – 2	9	2012
Stefania Boffa	0 – 2	-	0 – 2	2	2006
Janine Bourgnon	0 – 3	0 – 1	0 – 2	2	1963
Angela Bürgis	3 – 2	-	3 – 2	5	1996
Daniela Casanova	0 – 2	0 – 1	0 – 1	1	2001
Myriam Casanova	13 – 9	10 – 6	3 – 3	11	2001
Cathy Caverzasio	1 – 1	-	1 – 1	2	1991
Caecilia Charbonnier	0 – 3	0 – 2	0 – 1	1	1999
Céline Cohen	6 – 9	3 – 3	3 – 6	11	1986
Geraldine Dondit	1 – 4	1 – 2	0 – 2	5	1993
Lilian Drescher	5 – 3	3 – 1	2 – 2	4	1984
Susi Eichenberger	2 – 7	2 – 3	0 – 4	7	1974
Evagreth Emmenegger	1 – 7	0 – 4	1 – 3	5	1972
Christelle Fauche	4 – 1	3 – 1	1 – 0	4	1992
Rita Felix	2 – 7	1 – 3	1 – 4	6	1970
Sonja Fetz	0 – 2	0 – 1	0 – 1	1	1966
Emmanuelle Gagliardi	23 – 9	10 – 7	13 – 2	20	1997
Viktorija Golubic	5 – 6	2 – 4	3 – 2	7	2014
Silvia Gubler	1 – 1	1 – 0	0 – 1	1	1967
Martina Hingis	29 – 7	18 – 4	11 – 3	19	1995
Sandrine Jaquet	0 – 3	0 – 1	0 – 2	2	1988
Petra Jauch-Delhees	33 – 15	19 – 6	14 – 9	27	1976
Christiane Jolissaint	20 – 20	7 – 10	13 – 10	24	1977
Marianne Kindler	4 – 11	3 – 7	1 – 4	12	1968
Xenia Knoll	0 – 1	-	0 – 1	1	2015
Mateja Kraljevic	1 – 0	1 – 0	-	1	2009
Eva Krapl	8 – 8	4 – 3	4 – 5	11	1987
Martina Lautenschläger	0 – 1	-	0 – 1	1	2004
Manuela Maleeva-Fragniere	6 – 3	5 – 1	1 – 2	6	1991
Joana Manta	2 – 3	0 – 1	2 – 2	5	1993
Sarah Moundir	2 – 1	0 – 1	2 – 0	3	2010
Romina Oprandi	3 – 1	3 – 1	-	2	2013
Claudia Pasquale	1 – 2	1 – 2	-	3	1979
Nicole Riner	0 – 2	0 – 2	-	2	2006
Anne-Marie Ruegg	8 – 3	3 – 2	5 – 1	9	1976
Arlinda Rushiti	5 – 4	4 – 1	1 – 3	5	2018
Amra Sadiković	7 – 6	3 – 3	4 – 3	11	2009
Ingrid Sadlon	0 – 3	0 – 1	0 – 2	2	1973
Patty Schnyder	50 – 23	33 – 17	17 – 6	38	1996
Manuela Schwerzmann	0 – 1	-	0 – 1	1	1994
Monica Simmen	4 – 7	0 – 3	4 – 4	10	1976
Michèle Strebel	1 – 1	-	1 – 1	2	1992
Anne-Marie Studer	2 – 14	1 – 7	1 – 7	10	1963
Jil Teichmann	2 – 0	-	2 – 0	2	2018
Aliénor Tricerri	0 – 2	0 – 1	0 – 1	1	2001
Miroslava Vavrinec	0 – 2	-	0 – 2	2	1994
Gabrielle Villiger	1 – 1	0 – 1	1 – 0	2	1989
Isabelle Villiger	2 – 2	2 – 2	-	4	1978
Stefanie Vögele	6 – 14	5 – 11	1 – 3	14	2005
Annina Von Planta	0 – 2	-	0 – 2	2	1974
Alice Wavre	0 – 3	0 – 2	0 – 1	2	1963
Gaëlle Widmer	0 – 1	-	0 – 1	1	2005
Emanuela Zardo	15 – 15	10 – 9	5 – 6	26	1987
