= 1999 Wimbledon Championships – Mixed doubles =

Mixed doubles
- 1999 Wimbledon Championships

Final
- Champions: (India) Leander Paes (United States) Lisa Raymond
- Runners-up: (Sweden) Jonas Björkman (Russia) Anna Kournikova
- Score: 6–4, 3–6, 6–3

Details
- Draw: 64 (5 WC )
- Seeds: 16

Events
Singles	men	women		boys	girls
Doubles	men	women	mixed	boys	girls
WC Singles	men	women	quad
WC Doubles	men	women	quad
Legends	men	women	seniors
← 1998 ·	Wimbledon Championships	· 2000 →

Leander Paes and Lisa Raymond defeated Jonas Björkman and Anna Kournikova in the final, 6–4, 3–6, 6–3 to win the mixed doubles tennis title at the 1999 Wimbledon Championships.

Max Mirnyi and Serena Williams were the reigning champions, but Williams did not compete due to injury. Mirnyi competed with Mary Pierce, but lost in the second round to Martin Damm and Barbara Rittner.

This tournament was noteworthy for the participation of former singles world No. 1s John McEnroe and Steffi Graf as a team. They reached the semifinals before withdrawing so Graf could focus on the women's singles.

== Seeds ==
1. (India) Leander Paes / (United States) Lisa Raymond (champions)
2. (Australia) Todd Woodbridge / (United States) Lindsay Davenport (third round, retired)
3. (Sweden) Jonas Björkman / (Russia) Anna Kournikova (final)
4. (The Bahamas) Mark Knowles / (Russia) Elena Likhovtseva (semifinals)
5. (Czech Republic) Cyril Suk / (Netherlands) Caroline Vis (second round)
6. (United States) Rick Leach / (Latvia) Larisa Neiland (quarterfinals)
7. (South Africa) David Adams / (South Africa) Mariaan de Swardt (second round)
8. (United States) Justin Gimelstob / (United States) Venus Williams (quarterfinals)
9. (United States) John McEnroe / (Germany) Steffi Graf (semifinals, withdrew)
10. (Zimbabwe) Wayne Black / (Zimbabwe) Cara Black (third round)
11. (Australia) Sandon Stolle / (Australia) Kristine Kunce (first round)
12. (Australia) Andrew Florent / (Ukraine) Elena Tatarkova (second round)
13. (Czech Republic) David Rikl / (Slovakia) Karina Habšudová (first round)
14. (Australia) Peter Tramacchi / (Japan) Ai Sugiyama (second round)
15. (Belarus) Max Mirnyi / (France) Mary Pierce (second round)
16. (South Africa) Piet Norval / (Slovenia) Katarina Srebotnik (third round)

Click on the seed number of a player to go to their draw section.

== Draw ==
=== Key ===
- Q = Qualifier
- WC = Wild card
- LL = Lucky loser
- Alt = Alternate
- ITF = ITF entry
- PR = Protected ranking
- SR = Special ranking
- SE = Special exempt
- JE = Junior exempt
- JR = Junior Accelerator Programme entrant
- CO = College Accelerator Programme entrant
- NG = Next Gen Accelerator Program entrant
- w/o = Walkover
- r = Retired
- d = Defaulted

=== Finals ===
Quarterfinals
1	(India) Leander Paes (United States) Lisa Raymond	6	7^{7}
(United States) Bob Bryan (Australia) Lisa McShea	4	6^{2}
4	(The Bahamas) Mark Knowles (Russia) Elena Likhovtseva	6	7
(Czech Republic) Martin Damm (Germany) Barbara Rittner	3	5
6	(United States) Rick Leach (Latvia) Larisa Neiland	6^{6}	6	3
3	(Sweden) Jonas Björkman (Russia) Anna Kournikova	7^{8}	4	6
8	(United States) Justin Gimelstob (United States) Venus Williams	4	3
9/ WC	(United States) John McEnroe (Germany) Steffi Graf	6	6

Semifinals
1	(India) Leander Paes (United States) Lisa Raymond	6	6
4	(The Bahamas) Mark Knowles (Russia) Elena Likhovtseva	2	4
3	(Sweden) Jonas Björkman (Russia) Anna Kournikova
9/ WC	(United States) John McEnroe (Germany) Steffi Graf	w/o

Final
1	(India) Leander Paes (United States) Lisa Raymond	6	3	6
3	(Sweden) Jonas Björkman (Russia) Anna Kournikova	4	6	3

=== Top half ===
==== Section 1 ====
First round
1	(India) L Paes (United States) L Raymond	6	6
(Mexico) D Roditi (Canada) S Jeyaseelan	2	1
(South Africa) C Haggard (Belgium) E Callens	2	7^{7}	4
(Czech Republic) P Vízner (France) S Testud	6	6^{3}	6
(Argentina) P Albano (Netherlands) M Bollegraf	2	6	7
(United States) B MacPhie (United States) D Graham	6	4	5
(Australia) W Arthurs (Belarus) O Barabanschikova	5	3
12	(Australia) A Florent (Ukraine) E Tatarkova	7	6
10	(Zimbabwe) W Black (Zimbabwe) C Black	6	6
(United States) D Bowen (Argentina) L Montalvo	2	1
(Federal Republic of Yugoslavia) N Đorđević (Ukraine) O Lugina	2	1
(United States) S Humphries (Romania) C Cristea	6	6
(United States) B Bryan (Australia) L McShea	7^{9}	6^{5}	6
(United Kingdom) N Broad (South Africa) A Coetzer	6^{7}	7^{7}	4
(South Africa) M Barnard (United States) K Adams	2	4
5	(Czech Republic) C Suk (Netherlands) C Vis	6	6

Second round
1	(India) L Paes (United States) L Raymond	6	6
(Czech Republic) P Vízner (France) S Testud	3	4
(Argentina) P Albano (Netherlands) M Bollegraf	7	7^{8}
12	(Australia) A Florent (Ukraine) E Tatarkova	5	6^{6}
10	(Zimbabwe) W Black (Zimbabwe) C Black	6	4	4
(United States) S Humphries (Romania) C Cristea	2	6	2^{r}
(United States) B Bryan (Australia) L McShea	6	6
5	(Czech Republic) C Suk (Netherlands) C Vis	4	3

Third round
1	(India) L Paes (United States) L Raymond	7^{7}	6
(Argentina) P Albano (Netherlands) M Bollegraf	6^{4}	2
10	(Zimbabwe) W Black (Zimbabwe) C Black	6	3	3
(United States) B Bryan (Australia) L McShea	4	6	6

Quarterfinals
1	(India) L Paes (United States) L Raymond	6	7^{7}
(United States) B Bryan (Australia) L McShea	4	6^{2}

==== Section 2 ====
First round
4	(The Bahamas) M Knowles (Russia) E Likhovtseva	6	6
(Australia) M Tebbutt (Australia) C Barclay	4	3
(India) M Bhupathi (Australia) A Ellwood	2	6	10
(Australia) B Ellwood (Sweden) Å Carlsson	6	4	8
(South Africa) K Ullyett (Italy) L Golarsa	6	7^{8}
(United States) D Flach (Japan) R Hiraki	1	6^{6}
(United States) P Galbraith (Netherlands) K Boogert	6^{3}	7^{8}	6
13	(Czech Republic) D Rikl (Slovakia) K Habšudová	7^{7}	6^{6}	3
15	(Belarus) M Mirnyi (France) M Pierce	6	6
(Sweden) P Nyborg (Belgium) S Appelmans	3	4
(Czech Republic) M Damm (Germany) B Rittner	7	6
(South Africa) R Koenig (Australia) N Pratt	5	4
(United States) M Merklein (United States) E deLone	6	6
(Belgium) T Vanhoudt (Belgium) D Van Roost	3	4
(North Macedonia) A Kitinov (Japan) N Miyagi	2	7^{7}	2
7	(South Africa) D Adams (South Africa) M de Swardt	6	6^{2}	6

Second round
4	(The Bahamas) M Knowles (Russia) E Likhovtseva
(India) M Bhupathi (Australia) A Ellwood	w/o
(South Africa) K Ullyett (Italy) L Golarsa	6	5	3
(United States) P Galbraith (Netherlands) K Boogert	3	7	6
15	(Belarus) M Mirnyi (France) M Pierce	5	6	4
(Czech Republic) M Damm (Germany) B Rittner	7	4	6
(United States) M Merklein (United States) E deLone	3	6	6
7	(South Africa) D Adams (South Africa) M de Swardt	6	3	4

Third round
4	(The Bahamas) M Knowles (Russia) E Likhovtseva	6	7^{7}
(United States) P Galbraith (Netherlands) K Boogert	3	6^{2}
(Czech Republic) M Damm (Germany) B Rittner	6	7
(United States) M Merklein (United States) E deLone	1	5

Quarterfinals
4	(The Bahamas) M Knowles (Russia) E Likhovtseva	6	7
(Czech Republic) M Damm (Germany) B Rittner	3	5

=== Bottom half ===
==== Section 3 ====
First round
6	(United States) R Leach (Latvia) L Neiland	6	6
(United States) G Grant (South Africa) L Horn	1	4
Alt	(United States) D DiLucia (United States) M Shaughnessy	2	4
(Argentina) M Rodríguez (Argentina) F Labat	6	6
(United States) B Coupe (United States) L Osterloh	5	3
(United States) D Johnson (Australia) A Molik	7	6
(South Africa) B Haygarth (South Africa) J Steck	7	7^{7}
11	(Australia) S Stolle (Australia) K Kunce	5	6^{0}
16	(South Africa) P Norval (Slovenia) K Srebotnik	3
(Australia) M Hill (United States) C Morariu	0^{r}
WC	(United Kingdom) B Cowan (United Kingdom) J Pullin	3	6	3
(South Africa) G Stafford (South Africa) N de Villiers	6	3	6
WC	(United Kingdom) M Maclagan (United Kingdom) K Cross	2	6	5
(South Africa) J-L de Jager (Netherlands) M Oremans	6	4	7
(United States) M Bryan (United States) K Schlukebir	4	1
3	(Sweden) J Björkman (Russia) A Kournikova	6	6

Second round
6	(United States) R Leach (Latvia) L Neiland	3	6	6
(Argentina) M Rodríguez (Argentina) F Labat	6	3	2
(United States) D Johnson (Australia) A Molik	7^{7}	6
(South Africa) B Haygarth (South Africa) J Steck	6^{4}	4
16	(South Africa) P Norval (Slovenia) K Srebotnik	6	3	6
(South Africa) G Stafford (South Africa) N de Villiers	3	6	3
(South Africa) J-L de Jager (Netherlands) M Oremans	2	3
3	(Sweden) J Björkman (Russia) A Kournikova	6	6

Third round
6	(United States) R Leach (Latvia) L Neiland	6	3	6
(United States) D Johnson (Australia) A Molik	4	6	2
16	(South Africa) P Norval (Slovenia) K Srebotnik	6^{0}	1
3	(Sweden) J Björkman (Russia) A Kournikova	7^{7}	6

Quarterfinals
6	(United States) R Leach (Latvia) L Neiland	6^{6}	6	3
3	(Sweden) J Björkman (Russia) A Kournikova	7^{8}	4	6

==== Section 4 ====
First round
8	(United States) J Gimelstob (United States) V Williams	6	6
(South Africa) L Bale (Kazakhstan) I Selyutina	1	2
(Argentina) D del Río (Argentina) MF Landa	2^{r}
(Federal Republic of Yugoslavia) N Zimonjić (Slovenia) T Križan	5
WC	(United Kingdom) C Wilkinson (United Kingdom) S Smith	7^{7}	3	4
(Australia) A Kratzmann (Australia) K-A Guse	6^{1}	6	6
(Netherlands) T Kempers (Greece) C Papadáki	1	5
14	(Australia) P Tramacchi (Japan) A Sugiyama	6	7
9/ WC	(United States) J McEnroe (Germany) S Graf	6	6
Alt	(South Africa) J Coetzee (Czech Republic) E Melicharová	2	4
(Israel) E Ran (Brazil) V Menga	7	2	6
(United States) J Waite (United States) K Po	5	6	4
WC	(United Kingdom) D Sapsford (United Kingdom) L Woodroffe	7^{7}	3	3
(Australia) D Macpherson (Australia) R McQuillan	6^{1}	6	6
(United States) TJ Middleton (United States) L McNeil	4	2
2	(Australia) T Woodbridge (United States) L Davenport	6	6

Second round
8	(United States) J Gimelstob (United States) V Williams
(Federal Republic of Yugoslavia) N Zimonjić (Slovenia) T Križan	w/o
(Australia) A Kratzmann (Australia) K-A Guse	2	7	7
14	(Australia) P Tramacchi (Japan) A Sugiyama	6	5	5
9/ WC	(United States) J McEnroe (Germany) S Graf	6	6
(Israel) E Ran (Brazil) V Menga	3	4
(Australia) D Macpherson (Australia) R McQuillan	1	4
2	(Australia) T Woodbridge (United States) L Davenport	6	6

Third round
8	(United States) J Gimelstob (United States) V Williams	6	6
(Australia) A Kratzmann (Australia) K-A Guse	3	3
9/ WC	(United States) J McEnroe (Germany) S Graf	w/o
2	(Australia) T Woodbridge (United States) L Davenport

Quarterfinals
8	(United States) J Gimelstob (United States) V Williams	4	3
9/ WC	(United States) J McEnroe (Germany) S Graf	6	6
