= TheBlu =

Digital media franchise

- Created by: Neville Spiteri; Scott Yara; Jake Rowell; Scott Reeser
- Original work: TheBlu (2011 web application)
- Owner: Wevr
- Years: 2011–present

Miscellaneous
- Web/mobile apps: TheBlu (2011)
- Virtual reality: TheBluVR (2014); TheBlu: Whale Encounter (2015); TheBlu: Season 1 (2016); TheBlu: Deep Rescue (2018)

Official website
- wevr.com/theblu

TheBlu is a digital media franchise that utilizes virtual reality technology to create 3D-rendered, interactive simulations of underwater environments in the world's oceans. Iterations of TheBlu have appeared as applications for the Samsung Gear VR and HTC Vive headsets and on the Steam and Oculus stores. In 2018, the most recent project in the franchise (TheBlu: Deep Rescue) was launched using the Dreamscape Immersive platform, allowing up to six users to engage in a location-based experience. TheBlu was initially released as an interactive web application and screensaver by Wevr in 2011.

== History ==
TheBlu was originally conceived in 2010 by Neville Spiteri and Scott Yara, co-founders of Wemo Media (now known as Wevr). It was launched as a web application and interactive screensaver in 2011. The application allowed users to explore a virtual ocean that contained thousands of species of fish and other aquatic animals. In May 2012, a version of TheBlu was featured on the large Nasdaq and Reuters screens in Times Square in New York City. With TheBlu's companion mobile app, visitors could see fish swim from the screens to their phones. The creators of TheBlu won the 2012 SXSW Accelerator Award for best entertainment startup. In 2014, Wevr developed a virtual reality version of TheBlu app known as TheBluVR. It was among the first apps made available at the product launch of the Samsung Gear VR headset. TheBluVR won the Proto Award for Best Educational VR Experience in 2015.

In March 2015, a new virtual reality experience known as TheBlu: Encounter, which was co-created and directed by Jake Rowell, was unveiled at the Game Developers Conference in San Francisco. Exclusive to the HTC Vive headset at the time, TheBlu: Encounter allowed users to explore a shipwreck and eventually encounter a blue whale. TheBlu: Encounter experience was a 2016 Sundance New Frontier selection. It was later renamed TheBlu: Whale Encounter and packaged as part of a three-episode collection known as TheBlu: Season 1 in 2016. Season 1 was awarded the Proto Award for Most Transportive Experience.

In 2017, the Natural History Museum of Los Angeles County (NHMLA) opened its first virtual reality program featuring TheBlu: An Underwater VR Experience. In 2018, Wevr partnered with Dreamscape Immersive on its first story and location-based virtual reality experience known as TheBlu: Deep Rescue. First made available at the Westfield Century City mall in Los Angeles in December 2018, Deep Rescue allows up to six participants to engage in a 10-minute rescue mission to retrieve a baby whale.

== Education, Conservation, and Science ==
TheBlu has been recognized as a platform for ocean education and conservation and earned collaborations with organizations including Mission Blue. Dr. Sylvia Earle, National Geographic Explorer and Time Magazine’s Hero of the Planet, joined TheBlu advisory board in 2011. At the Wild Aid 2012 annual gala a single virtual 3D blue whale from TheBlu was auctioned for $10,000 with proceeds going towards raising awareness for ocean conservation. Dr. Luana Colloca of the University of Maryland conducts research on pain perception in the brain using virtual reality and TheBlu as a platform.
