= Simon Dickson =

British tennis player

- Country (sports): United Kingdom
- Born: 25 February 1982 (age 43)
- Plays: Right-handed
- Prize money: $42,304

Singles
- Highest ranking: No. 469 (16 July 2001)

Grand Slam singles results
- Wimbledon: Q2 (1999, 2002)

Doubles
- Career record: 0–2
- Highest ranking: No. 269 (15 July 2002)

Grand Slam doubles results
- Wimbledon: 1R (1999)

Simon Dickson (born 25 February 1982) is a British former professional tennis player.

Dickson, a top-10 junior who has beaten Roger Federer, featured in the men's doubles main draw of the 1999 Wimbledon Championships. He and Lee Childs lost in the first round to the Bryan brothers, Bob and Mike.
