= Martina Lautenschläger =

Swiss tennis player

Martina Lautenschlager
- Country (sports): Switzerland
- Born: 18 July 1988 (age 37)

Singles
- Highest ranking: No. 819 (15 November 2004)

Doubles
- Career titles: 1 ITF
- Highest ranking: No. 861 (1 November 2004)

Martina Lautenschlager (born 18 July 1988) is a Swiss former professional tennis player.

Lautenschlager played in a doubles rubber for the Switzerland Fed Cup team in 2004, as a member of a young and inexperienced Swiss squad for a tie against Canada in Dorval, Quebec. Switzerland won the tie and Lautenschlager got her opportunity in a doubles dead rubber, partnering Timea Bacsinszky. The pair were beaten in two tiebreak sets by Mélanie Marois and Marie-Ève Pelletier.

While competing on the junior circuit she also played in some professional tournaments and won an ITF doubles title at Lenzerheide in 2005. She left the professional tour in 2006.

== ITF finals ==
=== Doubles: 1 (1–0) ===
Outcome	Date	Tournament	Surface	Partner	Opponents	Score
Winner	13 June 2005	Lenzerheide, Switzerland	Clay	(Czech Republic) Petra Cetkovská	(Germany) Diana Vrânceanu (Austria) Eva-Maria Hoch	6–0, 6–3

== See also ==
- List of Switzerland Fed Cup team representatives
