= 1999 Wimbledon Championships – Men's singles =

Men's singles
- 1999 Wimbledon Championships

Final
- Champion: (United States) Pete Sampras
- Runner-up: (United States) Andre Agassi
- Score: 6–3, 6–4, 7–5

Details
- Draw: 128 (16Q / 8WC)
- Seeds: 16

Events
Singles	men	women		boys	girls
Doubles	men	women	mixed	boys	girls
WC Singles	men	women	quad
WC Doubles	men	women	quad
Legends	men	women	seniors
← 1998 ·	Wimbledon Championships	· 2000 →

Two-time defending champion Pete Sampras defeated Andre Agassi in the final, 6–3, 6–4, 7–5 to win the gentlemen's singles tennis title at the 1999 Wimbledon Championships. It was his record sixth Wimbledon title (surpassing Björn Borg's Open Era record) and twelfth major men's singles title overall (matching Roy Emerson's all-time record). Sampras' victory over Agassi is often cited as one of the greatest performances in a Wimbledon final. Despite his victory, Sampras lost the world No. 1 ranking to Agassi, who had recently won the French Open and was attempting to complete the Channel Slam.

This tournament marked the last major appearance for former world No. 1 and three-time Wimbledon champion Boris Becker, and marked the first Wimbledon appearances for future champion and world No. 1 Lleyton Hewitt and future eight-time champion and world No. 1 Roger Federer.

== Seeds ==
1. (United States) Pete Sampras (champion)
2. (Australia) Patrick Rafter (semifinals)
3. (Russia) Yevgeny Kafelnikov (third round, retired due to a hamstring injury)
4. (United States) Andre Agassi (final)
5. (Netherlands) Richard Krajicek (third round)
6. (United Kingdom) Tim Henman (semifinals)
7. (Australia) Mark Philippoussis (quarterfinals, retired due to a left knee injury)
8. (United States) Todd Martin (quarterfinals)
9. (United Kingdom) Greg Rusedski (fourth round)
10. (Croatia) Goran Ivanišević (fourth round)
11. (Brazil) Gustavo Kuerten (quarterfinals)
12. (Spain) Carlos Moyá (second round)
13. (Slovakia) Karol Kučera (fourth round)
14. (Germany) Tommy Haas (third round)
15. (Germany) Nicolas Kiefer (second round)
16. (Spain) Félix Mantilla (second round)

Click on the seed number of a player to go to their draw section.

== Draw ==
Key

- Q = Qualifier
- WC = Wild card
- LL = Lucky loser
- Alt = Alternate
- ITF = ITF entry
- PR = Protected ranking
- SR = Special ranking
- SE = Special exempt
- JE = Junior exempt
- JR = Junior Accelerator Programme entrant
- CO = College Accelerator Programme entrant
- NG = Next Gen Accelerator Program entrant
- w/o = Walkover
- r = Retired
- d = Defaulted

=== Finals ===
Quarterfinals
1	(United States) Pete Sampras	4	2
7	(Australia) Mark Philippoussis	6	1^{r}
(France) Cédric Pioline	4	2	6	3
6	(United Kingdom) Tim Henman	6	6	4	6
11	(Brazil) Gustavo Kuerten	3	4	4
4	(United States) Andre Agassi	6	6	6
8	(United States) Todd Martin	3	7^{7}	6^{5}	6^{3}
2	(Australia) Patrick Rafter	6	6^{5}	7^{7}	7^{7}

Semifinals
1	(United States) Pete Sampras	3	6	6	6
6	(United Kingdom) Tim Henman	6	4	3	4
4	(United States) Andre Agassi	7	7^{7}	6
2	(Australia) Patrick Rafter	5	6^{5}	2

Final
1	(United States) Pete Sampras	6	6	7
4	(United States) Andre Agassi	3	4	5

=== Top half ===
==== Section 1 ====
First round
1	(United States) Pete Sampras	6	6	6
(Australia) Scott Draper	3	4	4
(Canada) Sébastien Lareau	6	3	6	6
(Zimbabwe) Wayne Black	1	6	3	3
(Spain) Galo Blanco	6	3	7^{7}	7^{9}
(Japan) Takao Suzuki	4	6	6^{4}	6^{7}
(Spain) Julián Alonso	2	2	5
Q	(United Kingdom) Danny Sapsford	6	6	7
(Canada) Daniel Nestor	6	6	6
(Austria) Stefan Koubek	2	3	4
(Ukraine) Andriy Medvedev	7^{7}	7^{7}	6
(Germany) Bernd Karbacher	6^{1}	6^{3}	4
(Netherlands) Jan Siemerink	4	7	6	2	1
(United States) Paul Goldstein	6	5	4	6	6
(United States) Vince Spadea	6^{2}	6^{4}	6	6^{7}
16	(Spain) Félix Mantilla	7^{7}	7^{7}	4	7^{9}

Second round
1	(United States) P Sampras	6	6	6
(Canada) S Lareau	4	2	3
(Spain) G Blanco	3	6	4	2
Q	(United Kingdom) D Sapsford	6	3	6	6
(Canada) D Nestor	6	7	6
(Ukraine) A Medvedev	1	5	3
(United States) P Goldstein	6	6	6^{5}	6
16	(Spain) F Mantilla	2	4	7^{7}	2

Third round
1	(United States) P Sampras	6	6	7
Q	(United Kingdom) D Sapsford	3	4	5
(Canada) D Nestor	6	6^{3}	6	6^{4}	6
(United States) P Goldstein	3	7^{7}	0	7^{7}	4

Fourth round
1	(United States) P Sampras	6	6	6
(Canada) D Nestor	3	4	2

==== Section 2 ====
First round
9	(United Kingdom) Greg Rusedski	6	6	6
(Australia) Jason Stoltenberg	1	4	2
(Spain) Albert Costa	6	6^{5}	3	3
Q	(United Kingdom) Arvind Parmar	0	7^{7}	6	6
(Argentina) Gastón Gaudio	4	5	5
(Sweden) Magnus Norman	6	7	7
WC	(United Kingdom) Luke Milligan	4	5	6^{0}
(France) Fabrice Santoro	6	7	7^{7}
(Sweden) Thomas Johansson	5	7^{7}	6	4	6
Q	(United States) Richey Reneberg	7	6^{5}	3	6	1
LL	(Germany) Michael Kohlmann	2	6	6	5	4
(Spain) Francisco Clavet	6	1	3	7	6
(Australia) Mark Woodforde	6	6	6
(Slovakia) Dominik Hrbatý	4	2	2
(Belgium) Xavier Malisse	7^{7}	4	3	4
7	(Australia) Mark Philippoussis	6^{4}	6	6	6

Second round
9	(United Kingdom) G Rusedski	6	6	7^{7}
Q	(United Kingdom) A Parmar	3	4	6^{3}
(Sweden) M Norman	6	6	7^{7}
(France) F Santoro	2	3	6^{5}
(Sweden) T Johansson	6	6	1	3	4
(Spain) F Clavet	4	1	6	6	6
(Australia) M Woodforde	7^{7}	6^{6}	6^{5}	4
7	(Australia) M Philippoussis	6^{4}	7^{8}	7^{7}	6

Third round
9	(United Kingdom) G Rusedski	6	6	7
(Sweden) M Norman	3	4	5
(Spain) F Clavet	5	4	4
7	(Australia) M Philippoussis	7	6	6

Fourth round
9	(United Kingdom) G Rusedski	6	6^{4}	3	1
7	(Australia) M Philippoussis	2	7^{7}	6	6

==== Section 3 ====
First round
3	(Russia) Yevgeny Kafelnikov	6^{4}	7	7^{8}	4	7
(Sweden) Magnus Larsson	7^{7}	5	6^{6}	6	5
Q	(Thailand) Paradorn Srichaphan	6	6	7^{9}
(France) Guillaume Raoux	2	4	6^{7}
(Czech Republic) Martin Damm	6^{7}	4	2
(France) Cédric Pioline	7^{9}	6	6
(France) Arnaud Clément	6	6	6
(Spain) Albert Portas	3	2	4
(Czech Republic) Daniel Vacek	6	6	6
(Czech Republic) Bohdan Ulihrach	1	2	4
(Italy) Gianluca Pozzi	7^{8}	6	6
(Belarus) Vladimir Voltchkov	6^{6}	2	2
Q	(Brazil) André Sá	6	6	7^{7}
(India) Leander Paes	4	4	6^{4}
Q	(Mexico) Alejandro Hernández	2	1	2
13	(Slovakia) Karol Kučera	6	6	6

Second round
3	(Russia) Y Kafelnikov	6^{4}	6	7^{7}	6
Q	(Thailand) P Srichaphan	7^{7}	4	6^{4}	4
(France) C Pioline	6	6	6
(France) A Clément	3	1	3
(Czech Republic) D Vacek	4	6	7^{8}	5	6
(Italy) G Pozzi	6	3	6^{6}	7	3
Q	(Brazil) A Sá	6^{4}	3	2
13	(Slovakia) K Kučera	7^{7}	6	6

Third round
3	(Russia) Y Kafelnikov	6	4	0^{r}
(France) C Pioline	3	6	1
(Czech Republic) D Vacek	1	3	6	6^{4}
13	(Slovakia) K Kučera	6	6	3	7^{7}

Fourth round
(France) C Pioline	6	5	7^{7}	4	6
13	(Slovakia) K Kučera	4	7	6^{5}	6	3

==== Section 4 ====
First round
12	(Spain) Carlos Moyá	6	7	6
(Slovakia) Ján Krošlák	4	5	2
WC	(United Kingdom) Barry Cowan	3	4	4
(United States) Jim Courier	6	6	6
(South Africa) Wayne Ferreira	6^{13}	5	7^{12}	1
(Australia) Andrew Ilie	7^{15}	7	6^{10}	6
(Netherlands) Sjeng Schalken	5	6	6^{5}	7	6
(Italy) Davide Sanguinetti	7	4	7^{7}	5	3
(France) Sébastien Grosjean	5	6	7	7
(Zimbabwe) Byron Black	7	0	5	5
(Paraguay) Ramón Delgado	2	1	5
Q	(United Kingdom) Jamie Delgado	6	6	7
(United States) Chris Woodruff	6	3	6	6^{7}	6
(Armenia) Sargis Sargsian	3	6	3	7^{9}	2
(France) Arnaud Di Pasquale	4	0	6	6^{1}
6	(United Kingdom) Tim Henman	6	6	3	7^{7}

Second round
12	(Spain) C Moyá	3	6	6^{1}	6	2
(United States) J Courier	6	3	7^{7}	3	6
(Australia) A Ilie	4	1	6	3
(Netherlands) S Schalken	6	6	2	6
(France) S Grosjean	6	6	7^{7}
Q	(United Kingdom) J Delgado	2	2	6^{2}
(United States) C Woodruff	4	3	6^{4}
6	(United Kingdom) T Henman	6	6	7^{7}

Third round
(United States) J Courier	7^{7}	3	3	7	13
(Netherlands) S Schalken	6^{2}	6	6	5	11
(France) S Grosjean	1	7^{10}	3	2
6	(United Kingdom) T Henman	6	6^{8}	6	6

Fourth round
(United States) J Courier	6	5	5	7^{7}	7
6	(United Kingdom) T Henman	4	7	7	6^{5}	9

=== Bottom half ===
==== Section 5 ====
First round
5	(Netherlands) Richard Krajicek	6	6	6
(Norway) Christian Ruud	2	3	1
(Bulgaria) Orlin Stanoytchev	3	7^{7}	4	7^{7}	8
(Australia) Todd Woodbridge	6	6^{4}	6	6^{5}	10
Q	(Switzerland) Lorenzo Manta	6^{5}	7^{7}	7^{7}	6
WC	(United Kingdom) Tom Spinks	7^{7}	6^{3}	6^{2}	2
(United States) Jan-Michael Gambill	6	6	7^{7}
(Argentina) Franco Squillari	1	3	6^{5}
Q	(Federal Republic of Yugoslavia) Nenad Zimonjić	7^{7}	7^{7}	6^{6}	6
(Romania) Dinu Pescariu	6^{4}	6^{3}	7^{8}	4
(Costa Rica) Juan Antonio Marín	4	1	5
(United States) Jeff Tarango	6	6	7
(Argentina) Martin Rodríguez	5	4	6^{5}
(Germany) David Prinosil	7	6	7^{7}
WC	(United Kingdom) Chris Wilkinson	4	4	4
11	(Brazil) Gustavo Kuerten	6	6	6

Second round
5	(Netherlands) R Krajicek	7	6	6
(Australia) T Woodbridge	5	4	4
Q	(Switzerland) L Manta	6	6	3	6^{4}	6
(United States) J-M Gambill	4	4	6	7^{7}	3
Q	(Federal Republic of Yugoslavia) N Zimonjić	7^{7}	1	6	7^{8}
(United States) J Tarango	6^{5}	6	3	6^{6}
(Germany) D Prinosil	3	3	2
11	(Brazil) G Kuerten	6	6	6

Third round
5	(Netherlands) R Krajicek	3	6^{5}	6	6	4
Q	(Switzerland) L Manta	6	7^{7}	4	4	6
Q	(Federal Republic of Yugoslavia) N Zimonjić	4	4	2
11	(Brazil) G Kuerten	6	6	6

Fourth round
Q	(Switzerland) L Manta	5	4	7	3
11	(Brazil) G Kuerten	7	6	5	6

==== Section 6 ====
First round
14	(Germany) Tommy Haas	3	6	4	6	6
(Netherlands) Peter Wessels	6	4	6	3	4
(Australia) Richard Fromberg	6	7^{7}	6
(Sweden) Magnus Gustafsson	4	6^{1}	3
Q	(Australia) Wayne Arthurs	7^{9}	6^{5}	7^{12}	7^{7}
(Italy) Vincenzo Santopadre	6^{7}	7^{7}	6^{10}	6^{4}
(Romania) Adrian Voinea	6^{8}	3	6	6	6
(Ecuador) Nicolás Lapentti	7^{10}	6	4	2	8
(Spain) Alberto Martín	7^{10}	6	2	6^{3}	10
(Czech Republic) Ctislav Doseděl	6^{8}	4	6	7^{7}	8
(Germany) Oliver Gross	1	6	6^{3}	4
(Morocco) Younes El Aynaoui	6	4	7^{7}	6
(Argentina) Guillermo Cañas	4	6	6	1	9
WC	(United Kingdom) Martin Lee	6	3	2	6	7
(Romania) Andrei Pavel	1	2	3
4	(United States) Andre Agassi	6	6	6

Second round
14	(Germany) T Haas	6^{4}	4	6	6	6
(Australia) R Fromberg	7^{7}	6	4	3	2
Q	(Australia) W Arthurs	7	7^{9}	7
(Ecuador) N Lapentti	5	6^{7}	5
(Spain) A Martín	6	3	7	6
(Morocco) Y El Aynaoui	2	6	5	3
(Argentina) G Cañas	3	4	3
4	(United States) A Agassi	6	6	6

Third round
14	(Germany) T Haas	6^{6}	6^{3}	6^{2}
Q	(Australia) W Arthurs	7^{8}	7^{7}	7^{7}
(Spain) A Martín	2	0	6	3
4	(United States) A Agassi	6	6	2	6

Fourth round
Q	(Australia) W Arthurs	7^{7}	6^{5}	1	4
4	(United States) A Agassi	6^{5}	7^{7}	6	6

==== Section 7 ====
First round
8	(United States) Todd Martin	6^{6}	6^{5}	6	6	6
(Germany) Hendrik Dreekmann	7^{8}	7^{7}	3	2	4
(Czech Republic) Jiří Novák	6	3	4	6	6
WC	(Switzerland) Roger Federer	3	6	6	3	4
(Austria) Markus Hipfl	4	7	6	3	2
(Switzerland) Marc Rosset	6	5	3	6	6
(United States) Justin Gimelstob	3	6	7	2	7
(Germany) Jens Knippschild	6	2	5	6	9
(Morocco) Hicham Arazi	6^{4}	3	2
(Netherlands) Paul Haarhuis	7^{7}	6	6
(Spain) Fernando Vicente	3	6	2	7	6
(United States) Cecil Mamiit	6	2	6	5	3
(Netherlands) John van Lottum	6^{8}	3	1
Q	(Australia) Sandon Stolle	7^{10}	6	6
Q	(Sweden) Mikael Tillström	4	3	4
10	(Croatia) Goran Ivanišević	6	6	6

Second round
8	(United States) T Martin	7^{7}	6	6
(Czech Republic) J Novák	6^{5}	4	4
(Switzerland) M Rosset	3	4	4
(Germany) J Knippschild	6	6	6
(Netherlands) P Haarhuis	6	6	6
(Spain) F Vicente	2	2	2
Q	(Australia) S Stolle	6^{8}	4	6	4
10	(Croatia) G Ivanišević	7^{10}	6	4	6

Third round
8	(United States) T Martin	6^{5}	6	7^{8}	7
(Germany) J Knippschild	7^{7}	1	6^{6}	5
(Netherlands) P Haarhuis	6^{2}	4	6^{3}
10	(Croatia) G Ivanišević	7^{7}	6	7^{7}

Fourth round
8	(United States) T Martin	7^{7}	6	6
10	(Croatia) G Ivanišević	6^{3}	3	4

==== Section 8 ====
First round
15	(Germany) Nicolas Kiefer	2	6	6	7^{7}
Q	(Germany) Christian Vinck	6	4	3	6^{4}
(Germany) Boris Becker	5	6^{7}	6	7	6
WC	(United Kingdom) Miles Maclagan	7	7^{9}	4	5	2
(Australia) Lleyton Hewitt	6	6	6
WC	(Uruguay) Marcelo Filippini	2	2	1
(Morocco) Karim Alami	6	6	6
(Italy) Laurence Tieleman	4	2	4
Q	(Portugal) Nuno Marques	1	4	4
(Germany) Rainer Schüttler	6	6	6
(Sweden) Thomas Enqvist	6	6	7^{7}
(Argentina) Hernán Gumy	1	4	6^{2}
(Sweden) Jonas Björkman	6	6	6
Q	(South Africa) Grant Stafford	4	1	4
Q	(Italy) Cristiano Caratti	3	2	2
2	(Australia) Patrick Rafter	6	6	6

Second round
15	(Germany) N Kiefer	4	2	4
(Germany) B Becker	6	6	6
(Australia) L Hewitt	6	6	4	6
(Morocco) K Alami	1	4	6	4
(Germany) R Schüttler	2	4	5
(Sweden) T Enqvist	6	6	7
(Sweden) J Björkman	2	6^{3}	7^{9}	2
2	(Australia) P Rafter	6	7^{7}	6^{7}	6

Third round
(Germany) B Becker	6	6	7^{7}
(Australia) L Hewitt	1	4	6^{5}
(Sweden) T Enqvist	6^{5}	2	2
2	(Australia) P Rafter	7^{7}	6	6

Fourth round
(Germany) B Becker	3	2	3
2	(Australia) P Rafter	6	6	6

Preceded by 1999 French Open – Men's singles	Grand Slam men's singles	Succeeded by 1999 US Open – Men's singles
