= 1999 Wimbledon Championships – Women's singles =

Women's singles
- 1999 Wimbledon Championships

Final
- Champion: (United States) Lindsay Davenport
- Runner-up: (Germany) Steffi Graf
- Score: 6–4, 7–5

Details
- Draw: 128 (8 Q / 8 WC )
- Seeds: 16

Events
Singles	men	women		boys	girls
Doubles	men	women	mixed	boys	girls
WC Singles	men	women	quad
WC Doubles	men	women	quad
Legends	men	women	seniors
← 1998 ·	Wimbledon Championships	· 2000 →

Lindsay Davenport defeated Steffi Graf in the final, 6–4, 7–5 to win the ladies' singles tennis title at the 1999 Wimbledon Championships. It was her second major singles title. Davenport did not lose a set during the tournament. This marked the last major appearance of 22-time major singles champion, Olympic gold medalist, and former world No. 1 Graf; she was also attempting to complete the Channel Slam.

Jana Novotná was the defending champion, but lost in the quarterfinals to Davenport.

This tournament saw a number of surprises, including world No. 129 and qualifier Jelena Dokic's first-round defeat of world No. 1 Martina Hingis, ending Hingis' streak of 11 major semifinals (dating to the 1996 US Open). This tournament also saw Alexandra Stevenson become the second qualifier in the Open Era (after Christine Matison in the 1978 Australian Open) to reach a major semifinal.

This marked the major singles debut of future world No. 1 and four-time major singles champion Kim Clijsters; she lost to Graf in the fourth round.

== Seeds ==
1. (Switzerland) Martina Hingis (first round)
2. (Germany) Steffi Graf (final)
3. (United States) Lindsay Davenport (champion)
4. (United States) Monica Seles (third round)
5. (Czech Republic) Jana Novotná (quarterfinals)
6. (United States) Venus Williams (quarterfinals)
7. (Spain) Arantxa Sánchez Vicario (second round)
8. (France) Nathalie Tauziat (quarterfinals)
9. (France) Mary Pierce (fourth round)
10. (United States) Serena Williams (withdrew)
11. (France) Julie Halard-Decugis (third round)
12. (South Africa) Amanda Coetzer (third round)
13. (France) Sandrine Testud (third round)
14. (Austria) Barbara Schett (fourth round)
15. (Belgium) Dominique Van Roost (fourth round)
16. (Belarus) Natasha Zvereva (second round)
17. (Russia) Anna Kournikova (fourth round)

Click on the seed number of a player to go to their draw section.

Serena Williams withdrew due to a flu and high fever. She was replaced in the draw by the highest-ranked non-seeded player Anna Kournikova, who became the #17 seed.

== Draw ==
=== Key ===
- Q = Qualifier
- WC = Wild card
- LL = Lucky loser
- Alt = Alternate
- ITF = ITF entry
- PR = Protected ranking
- SR = Special ranking
- SE = Special exempt
- JE = Junior exempt
- JR = Junior Accelerator Programme entrant
- CO = College Accelerator Programme entrant
- NG = Next Gen Accelerator Program entrant
- w/o = Walkover
- r = Retired
- d = Defaulted

=== Finals ===
Quarterfinals
Q	(Australia) Jelena Dokic	3	6	3
Q	(United States) Alexandra Stevenson	6	1	6
3	(United States) Lindsay Davenport	6	6
5	(Czech Republic) Jana Novotná	3	4
8	(France) Nathalie Tauziat	6	4	5
SE	(Croatia) Mirjana Lučić	4	6	7
6	(United States) Venus Williams	2	6	4
2	(Germany) Steffi Graf	6	3	6

Semifinals
Q	(United States) Alexandra Stevenson	1	1
3	(United States) Lindsay Davenport	6	6
SE	(Croatia) Mirjana Lučić	7^{7}	4	3
2	(Germany) Steffi Graf	6^{3}	6	6

Final
3	(United States) Lindsay Davenport	6	7
2	(Germany) Steffi Graf	4	5

=== Top half ===
==== Section 1 ====
First round
1	(Switzerland) M Hingis	2	0
Q	(Australia) J Dokic	6	6
(Slovakia) K Studeníková	6	6
(France) É Loit	1	3
(Luxembourg) A Kremer	6	4	7
(United States) MJ Fernández	3	6	5
(Romania) I Spîrlea	4	1
(United States) B Rippner	6	6
(Spain) V Ruano Pascual	3	6	3
(United States) M Shaughnessy	6	3	6
(Germany) E Wagner	6	6
WC	(United Kingdom) A Tordoff	0	2
(United States) K Brandi	2	6	3
(Italy) R Grande	6	1	6
(Colombia) F Zuluaga	3	2
9	(France) M Pierce	6	6

Second round
Q	(Australia) J Dokic	6	4	8
(Slovakia) K Studeníková	0	6	6
(Luxembourg) A Kremer	6	6
(United States) B Rippner	2	3
(United States) M Shaughnessy	6^{3}	3
(Germany) E Wagner	7^{7}	6
(Italy) R Grande	1	3
9	(France) M Pierce	6	6

Third round
Q	(Australia) J Dokic	6^{7}	6	6
(Luxembourg) A Kremer	7^{9}	3	4
(Germany) E Wagner	3	0
9	(France) M Pierce	6	6

Fourth round
Q	(Australia) J Dokic	6	6
9	(France) M Pierce	4	3

==== Section 2 ====
First round
11	(France) J Halard-Decugis	6	6
(Federal Republic of Yugoslavia) S Načuk	1	0
(Italy) A Serra Zanetti	2	1
(Italy) S Farina	6	6
(United States) A Frazier	1	6	3
Q	(United States) A Stevenson	6	3	6
(Romania) C Cristea	2	3
(Belarus) O Barabanschikova	6	6
(United States) T Snyder	6	7
(Sweden) Å Carlsson	2	5
(Spain) C Martínez	6	6
(Hungary) R Kuti-Kis	2	1
(United States) L Raymond	6	3	8
(Germany) A Glass	3	6	6
Q	(Hungary) A Földényi	6	3	4
7	(Spain) A Sánchez Vicario	4	6	6

Second round
11	(France) J Halard-Decugis	6	3	8
(Italy) S Farina	2	6	6
Q	(United States) A Stevenson	6	6^{3}	6
(Belarus) O Barabanschikova	2	7^{7}	3
(United States) T Snyder	4	1
(Spain) C Martínez	6	6
(United States) L Raymond	7^{7}	6
7	(Spain) A Sánchez Vicario	6^{4}	1

Third round
11	(France) J Halard-Decugis	3	3
Q	(United States) A Stevenson	6	6
(Spain) C Martínez	3	1
(United States) L Raymond	6	6

Fourth round
Q	(United States) A Stevenson	2	7^{10}	6
(United States) L Raymond	6	6^{8}	1

==== Section 3 ====
First round
3	(United States) L Davenport	6	6
(France) A Fusai	0	3
(Slovakia) K Habšudová	6	6
WC	(United Kingdom) L Woodroffe	3	2
(Bulgaria) P Stoyanova	2	2
(Italy) L Golarsa	6	6
(Belgium) E Callens	0	3
(France) A Cocheteux	6	6
PR	(United States) N Arendt	6	7^{7}
(Spain) M Serna	3	6^{4}
(Latvia) L Neiland	0	7	6
(China) F Li	6	5	2
(Bulgaria) L Bacheva	4	6	4
(France) A Dechaume-Balleret	6	4	6
(Spain) G Leon García	5	2
14	(Austria) B Schett	7	6

Second round
3	(United States) L Davenport	6	6
(Slovakia) K Habšudová	2	2
(Italy) L Golarsa	6	6
(France) A Cocheteux	4	2
PR	(United States) N Arendt	6	5	4
(Latvia) L Neiland	2	7	6
(France) A Dechaume-Balleret	7^{8}	3	1
14	(Austria) B Schett	6^{6}	6	6

Third round
3	(United States) L Davenport	6	6
(Italy) L Golarsa	3	2
(Latvia) L Neiland	2	3
14	(Austria) B Schett	6	6

Fourth round
3	(United States) L Davenport	7^{9}	6
14	(Austria) B Schett	6^{7}	1

==== Section 4 ====
First round
16	(Belarus) N Zvereva	5	6	6
(United States) K Po	7	1	3
(Russia) T Panova	6	6
(Slovakia) H Nagyová	3	3
(Switzerland) P Schnyder	7	3	3
(France) N Dechy	5	6	6
(Belgium) S Appelmans	6	6^{5}	6
(Croatia) S Talaja	3	7^{7}	3
(Spain) M Sánchez Lorenzo	6	7^{7}
Q	(United States) L Wild	3	6^{4}
(Canada) S Jeyaseelan	6	3	4
Q	(Russia) N Petrova	3	6	6
(Zimbabwe) C Black	6^{5}	5
(Austria) S Plischke	7^{7}	7
(Chinese Taipei) S-t Wang	2	1
5	(Czech Republic) J Novotná	6	6

Second round
16	(Belarus) N Zvereva	4	5
(Russia) T Panova	6	7
(France) N Dechy	6	7^{8}
(Belgium) S Appelmans	3	6^{6}
(Spain) M Sánchez Lorenzo	7	6
Q	(Russia) N Petrova	5	1
(Austria) S Plischke	3	1
5	(Czech Republic) J Novotná	6	6

Third round
(Russia) T Panova	0	3
(France) N Dechy	6	6
(Spain) M Sánchez Lorenzo	4	3
5	(Czech Republic) J Novotná	6	6

Fourth round
(France) N Dechy	3	5
5	(Czech Republic) J Novotná	6	7

=== Bottom half ===
==== Section 5 ====
First round
8	(France) N Tauziat	6	6
WC	(United Kingdom) L Ahl	3	2
(Netherlands) A Hopmans	6	6
(Czech Republic) S Kleinová	4	2
(Canada) J Nejedly	3	3
Q	(Netherlands) S Noorlander	6	6
(Germany) A Huber	7	3	7
(United States) J Capriati	5	6	9
(Poland) M Grzybowska	1	2
(Japan) A Sugiyama	6	6
(Australia) A Molik	2	0
(Russia) E Likhovtseva	6	6
(Netherlands) K Boogert	6	7
(United States) C Rubin	4	5
LL	(Russia) E Dementieva	6	4	4
15	(Belgium) D Van Roost	3	6	6

Second round
8	(France) N Tauziat	6	6
(Netherlands) A Hopmans	3	4
Q	(Netherlands) S Noorlander	6	6
(United States) J Capriati	1	3
(Japan) A Sugiyama	6^{6}	1
(Russia) E Likhovtseva	7^{8}	6
(Netherlands) K Boogert	3	3
15	(Belgium) D Van Roost	6	6

Third round
8	(France) N Tauziat	6	6
Q	(Netherlands) S Noorlander	1	1
(Russia) E Likhovtseva	4	6^{4}
15	(Belgium) D Van Roost	6	7^{7}

Fourth round
8	(France) N Tauziat	6	3	6
15	(Belgium) D Van Roost	3	6	3

==== Section 6 ====
First round
13	(France) S Testud	6	6
WC	(United Kingdom) J Pullin	1	3
(Czech Republic) D Chládková	4	2
(Germany) B Rittner	6	6
(Canada) M Drake	6	6
(Russia) E Kulikovskaya	3	0
(Thailand) T Tanasugarn	6	6
(Czech Republic) K Hrdličková	1	4
(Argentina) M Díaz Oliva	7^{7}	7
(Israel) A Smashnova	6^{3}	5
Q	(United States) E deLone	6	6^{4}	5
SE	(Croatia) M Lučić	3	7^{7}	7
WC	(United Kingdom) J Ward	6	5	3
(Germany) M Weingärtner	4	7	6
(Spain) C Torrens Valero	3	1
4	(United States) M Seles	6	6

Second round
13	(France) S Testud	7^{7}	6
(Germany) B Rittner	6^{2}	1
(Canada) M Drake	4	3
(Thailand) T Tanasugarn	6	6
(Argentina) M Díaz Oliva	2	1
SE	(Croatia) M Lučić	6	6
(Germany) M Weingärtner	0	0
4	(United States) M Seles	6	6

Third round
13	(France) S Testud	2	6	3
(Thailand) T Tanasugarn	6	1	6
SE	(Croatia) M Lučić	7^{7}	7^{7}
4	(United States) M Seles	6^{4}	6^{4}

Fourth round
(Thailand) T Tanasugarn	5	3
SE	(Croatia) M Lučić	7	6

==== Section 7 ====
First round
6	(United States) V Williams	6	7
(Netherlands) M Oremans	1	5
(United States) J Chi	5	0
(Ukraine) E Tatarkova	7	6
(Slovenia) K Srebotnik	6^{5}	7	1
(France) S Pitkowski	7^{7}	5	6
(France) A-G Sidot	4	2
WC	(United Kingdom) L Latimer	6	6
(Romania) R Dragomir	6	6
(Argentina) P Suárez	4	1
(Argentina) I Gorrochategui	6	1	6
(United Kingdom) S Smith	2	6	2
(Venezuela) M Vento	7	6
(Switzerland) E Gagliardi	5	3
WC	(Austria) B Schwartz	6^{2}	6	2
17	(Russia) A Kournikova	7^{7}	4	6

Second round
6	(United States) V Williams	6	6
(Ukraine) E Tatarkova	3	4
(France) S Pitkowski	7	5	6
WC	(United Kingdom) L Latimer	5	7	3
(Romania) R Dragomir	2	2
(Argentina) I Gorrochategui	6	6
(Venezuela) M Vento	5	4
17	(Russia) A Kournikova	7	6

Third round
6	(United States) V Williams	6	6
(France) S Pitkowski	1	1
(Argentina) I Gorrochategui	5	1^{r}
17	(Russia) A Kournikova	7	3

Fourth round
6	(United States) V Williams	3	6	6
17	(Russia) A Kournikova	6	3	2

==== Section 8 ====
First round
12	(South Africa) A Coetzer	6	7
(Australia) N Pratt	2	5
(Greece) C Papadáki	3	2
(Japan) M Saeki	6	6
(South Africa) J Kruger	2	3
Q	(Belgium) K Clijsters	6	6
(United States) L Osterloh	1	4
WC	(United Kingdom) K Cross	6	6
(Australia) K-A Guse	6	4	1
(Chinese Taipei) J Lee	3	6	6
(United States) C Morariu	7^{10}	3	6
(Belgium) L Courtois	6^{8}	6	2
(United States) J Watanabe	1	4
(South Africa) M de Swardt	6	6
(Slovakia) Ľ Cervanová	1	4
2	(Germany) S Graf	6	6

Second round
12	(South Africa) A Coetzer	6	6
(Japan) M Saeki	4	1
Q	(Belgium) K Clijsters	6	6
WC	(United Kingdom) K Cross	2	0
(Chinese Taipei) J Lee	2	4
(United States) C Morariu	6	6
(South Africa) M de Swardt	6	3	2
2	(Germany) S Graf	4	6	6

Third round
12	(South Africa) A Coetzer	2	4
Q	(Belgium) K Clijsters	6	6
(United States) C Morariu	1	3
2	(Germany) S Graf	6	6

Fourth round
Q	(Belgium) K Clijsters	2	2
2	(Germany) S Graf	6	6

Preceded by 1999 French Open – Women's singles	Grand Slam women's singles	Succeeded by 1999 US Open – Women's singles
