= Alan Mackin (footballer) =

Scottish footballer (born 1955)

Personal information
- Date of birth: 29 July 1955 (age 71)
- Place of birth: Lennoxtown, Scotland
- Position: Central defender

Youth career
- Renfrew

Senior career*
Years	Team	Apps	(Gls)
1976–1978	Queen's Park	74	(4)
1978–1980	Motherwell	17	(0)
1980–1984	Falkirk	141	(16)
1984	→ Morton (loan)	11	(0)
1984–1986	Partick Thistle	29	(1)
1986	East Stirlingshire	4	(1)
1986–1987	Alloa Athletic	8	(0)
1987–1989	Queen of the South	51	(3)
1989	Clyde	7	(0)
1989–1990	East Stirlingshire	6	(0)
Total		348	(25)

Managerial career
- 1989–1990: East Stirlingshire
- * Club domestic league appearances and goals

Alan Mackin (born 29 July 1955) is a Scottish former professional footballer who played as a central defender.

== Career ==
Born in Lennoxtown, Mackin played for Renfrew, Queen's Park, Motherwell, Falkirk, Morton, Partick Thistle, East Stirlingshire, Alloa Athletic, Queen of the South and Clyde.

After retiring from playing, Mackin was involved with the running East Stirlingshire, both as a chairman, and as a director.

== Personal life ==
His son, also named Alan, was a professional tennis player.
