= Laura Bao =

Swiss tennis player (born 1982)

- Country (sports): Switzerland
- Born: 6 March 1982 (age 43); Geneva, Switzerland
- Plays: Right-handed
- Prize money: $22,335

Singles
- Career record: 92–73
- Career titles: 2 ITF
- Highest ranking: No. 331 (12 July 1999)

Doubles
- Career record: 17–14
- Career titles: 1 ITF
- Highest ranking: No. 409 (10 May 1999)

Laura Bao (born 6 March 1982) is a former professional tennis player from Switzerland.

A right-handed player from Geneva, Bao competed in top international events as a junior, including Wimbledon. She made the girls' doubles semi-finals at the 1998 US Open, partnering Caecilia Charbonnier.

In 1999 she represented Switzerland in a Fed Cup World Group tie against Slovakia. Her only appearance came in the doubles rubber, which she and Charbonnier lost to Karina Habšudová and Henrieta Nagyová.

== ITF finals ==
Legend
$25,000 tournaments
$10,000 tournaments

=== Singles (2–3) ===
Result	No.	Date	Tournament	Surface	Opponent	Score
Loss	1.	15 November 1998	ITF Bossonnens, Switzerland	Clay	(Czech Republic) Zuzana Ondrášková	2–6, 5–7
Loss	2.	9 May 1999	ITF Verona, Italy	Clay	(Bulgaria) Antoaneta Pandjerova	7–5, 5–7, 5–7
Win	3.	13 June 1999	ITF Biel, Switzerland	Clay	(Australia) Mireille Dittmann	7–5, 6–4
Loss	4.	22 October 2000	ITF Chieti, Italy	Clay	(Sweden) Maria Wolfbrandt	5–3, 4–5, 4–2, 4–5, 3–5
Win	5.	14 July 2002	ITF Sezze, Italy	Clay	(Israel) Yevgenia Savranska	6–3, 7–6^{(4)}

=== Doubles (1–4) ===
Result	No.	Date	Tournament	Surface	Partner	Opponents	Score
Loss	1.	15 June 1997	ITF Bossonnens, Switzerland	Clay	(Switzerland) Caecilia Charbonnier	(Netherlands) Kim Kilsdonk (Netherlands) Jolanda Mens	4–6, 2–6
Win	2.	14 June 1998	ITF Lenzerheide, Switzerland	Clay	(Switzerland) Caecilia Charbonnier	(Argentina) Paula Racedo (Switzerland) Emanuela Zardo	6–4, 6–0
Loss	3.	21 June 1998	ITF Biel, Switzerland	Clay	(France) Samantha Schoeffel	(Germany) Kirstin Freye (United States) Jean Okada	0–6, 7–6, 1–6
Loss	4.	14 March 1999	ITF Biel, Switzerland	Clay	(Switzerland) Marylene Losey	(Hungary) Nóra Köves (Serbia and Montenegro) Dragana Zarić	2–6, 2–6
Loss	5.	20 June 1999	ITF Lenzerheide, Switzerland	Clay	(Switzerland) Marylene Losey	(Argentina) Vanesa Krauth (France) Julie de Roo	3–6, 1–6

== See also ==
- List of Switzerland Fed Cup team representatives
