= Alan Mackin (tennis) =

Scottish tennis player

- Country (sports): (United Kingdom) Great Britain
- Born: 11 August 1981 (age 45) Paisley, Scotland
- Height: 5 ft 11 in (180 cm)
- Turned pro: 1997
- Retired: 2007
- Plays: Right-handed (two-handed backhand)

Singles
- Career record: 1–15
- Career titles: 0
- Highest ranking: No. 213 (13 September 2004)

Grand Slam singles results
- Australian Open: 1R (2007)
- Wimbledon: 1R (2002, 2003, 2005, 2006)

Doubles
- Career record: 0–1
- Career titles: 0
- Highest ranking: No. 536 (18 September 2000)

Grand Slam doubles results
- Wimbledon: 1R (2005)

Team competitions
- Davis Cup: World Group 1R (2003)

Alan Mackin (born 11 August 1981) is a former professional tennis player from Scotland who competed for Great Britain in Davis Cup.

== Career ==
Mackin was a quarterfinalist in the boys' singles at the 1999 Wimbledon Championships.

Mackin represented the United Kingdom in various team competitions throughout his junior playing career and was a member of the 1995 14-and-under UK junior team that captured the European and World championships. He went on to capture ITF Satellite and Future event titles in Europe, Asia and the Caribbean. His best performances on the ATP circuit came when he reached the semi-finals of Challenger category events in Germany (Aschaffenburg) and in Nottingham (UK).

Mackin played in the main draw of several ATP events where he passed through the qualifying rounds with wins over players in the top 100 ATP rankings. In 2002, at a satellite tournament on clay courts in Terrassa, Mackin defeated a young Rafael Nadal.

He played in the main draw of four Wimbledon Championships but was unable to progress past the first round. However, in 2006 he took that year's Australian Open runner-up, Marcos Baghdatis, to five sets. Mackin won the second and third sets, in tiebreaks, but eventually went on to lose the match in the final set following a 261-minute match. Mackin took part in the 2005 and 2007 Australian Open. He came through the qualifying rounds in 2007 however lost in the opening round to Nicolás Lapentti.

The Scot appeared in three Davis Cup ties for Great Britain. He played the opening rubber of Great Britain's World Group fixture against Australia in 2003, losing to Mark Philippoussis. The Australians went on to win the competition. In 2005, he took part in both singles rubbers against Switzerland in Geneva. He lost in straight set to Roger Federer and also lost his second singles match in 2 close sets against Stanislas Wawrinka. His only other appearance came in 2006, when he beat Israel's Dekel Valtzer.

Since his retirement from the circuit in 2007, Mackin has directed and implemented tennis programs in the UK and Australia.

== Personal life ==
His father, also named Alan, was a professional footballer.
