= Caecilia Charbonnier =

Swiss tennis player (born 1981)

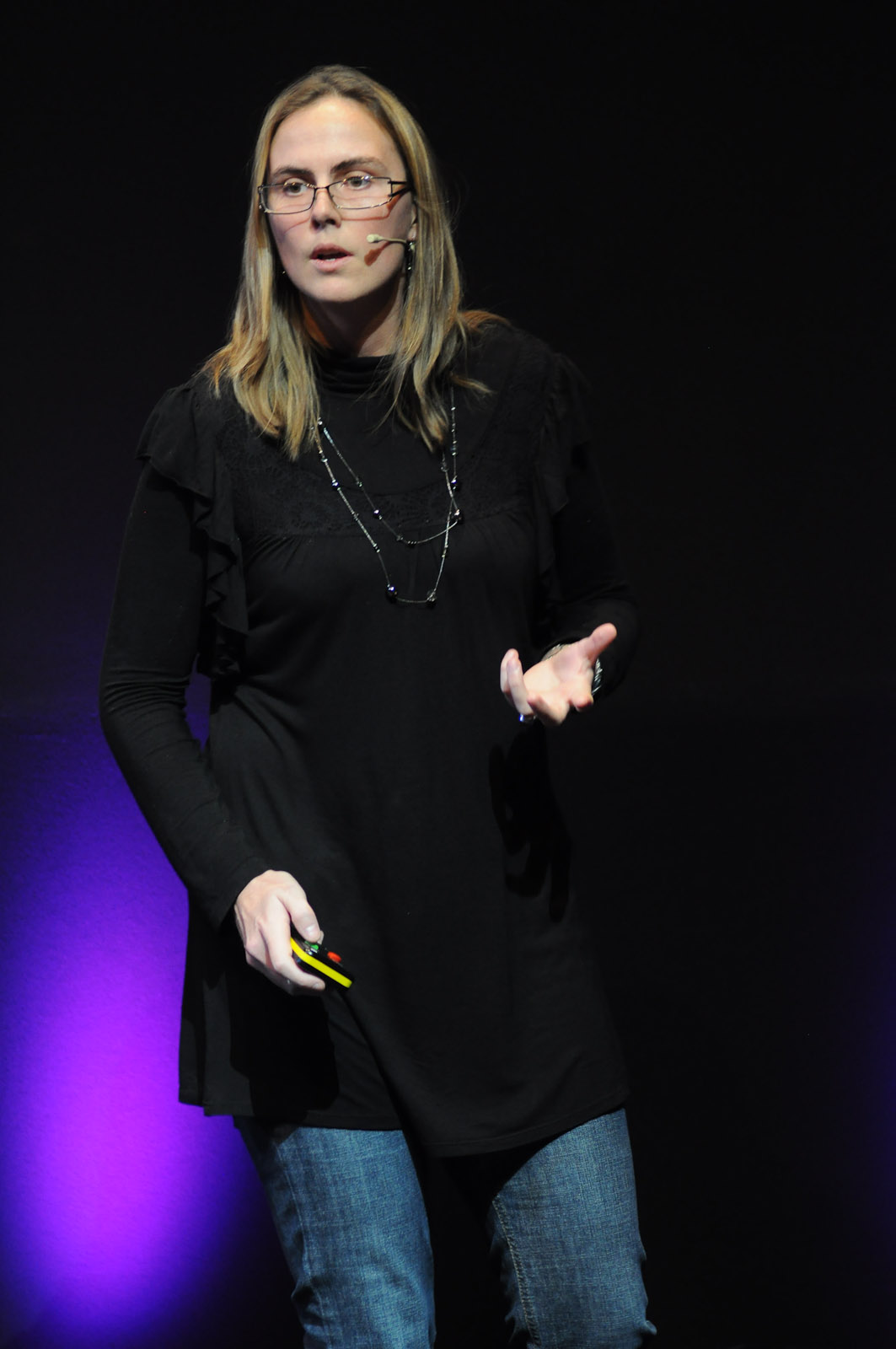
- Country (sports): Switzerland
- Born: 7 December 1981 (age 44) Geneva, Switzerland
- Retired: 1999
- Plays: Right-handed (one–handed backhand)
- Prize money: $10,343

Singles
- Highest ranking: No. 414 (30 March 1998)

Doubles
- Highest ranking: No. 452 (15 September 1997)

Team competitions
- Fed Cup: 0–3

Caecilia Charbonnier (born 7 December 1981) is a former professional tennis player from Switzerland. She is the co-founder and CIO of Dreamscape Immersive, and the co-founder, president, and research director of Artanim.

== Biography ==
Charbonnier, who was born in Geneva, played on the pro tour in the late 1990s, while still competing in junior events. She was ranked No. 4 in Switzerland and won 11 Swiss champion titles. A right-handed player, she is most noted for representing Switzerland in a Fed Cup World Group tie against Slovakia in 1999. She featured in two singles rubbers as well as in the doubles. Charbonnier competed in top international events as a junior, including Grand Slam tournaments, and she made the girls' doubles semifinals at the 1998 US Open.

Retiring from tennis in 1999, Charbonnier later studied computer graphics at University of Geneva and EPFL. In 2010, she obtained a PhD in computer science from MIRALab - University of Geneva, studying the hip joint kinematics of professional ballerinas. In 2011, she co-founded the Artanim Foundation, a non-profit research center specialized in motion capture technologies, where she serves since as President & Research Director. At Artanim, her interdisciplinary work focus on the use of motion capture for 3D animation, live performances, virtual reality (VR), movement science, orthopedics and sports medicine. The results of her research won several international scientific awards.

In 2016, she was one of the founders of VR entertainment company Dreamscape Immersive. The American company uses Artanim's VR technology to create the next generation of location-based entertainment. Early investors include Steven Spielberg, Warner Bros., Metro-Goldwyn-Mayer, 20th Century Fox, Westfield Malls, IMAX, Nickelodeon, AMC Theatres, Majid Al Futtaim, and Hans Zimmer.

== ITF finals ==
Legend
$10,000 tournaments

=== Singles (1–2) ===
Result	No.	Date	Tournament	Surface	Opponent	Score
Loss	1.	15 June 1997	Bossonnens, Switzerland	Clay	(United States) Tracy Singian	4–6, 4–6
Loss	2.	12 October 1997	Biel, Switzerland	Clay	(Switzerland) Emanuela Zardo	6–3, 1–6, 5–7
Win	3.	9 May 1999	Swansea, United Kingdom	Clay	(Ukraine) Anna Zaporozhanova	7–6, 6–4

=== Doubles (1–2) ===
Result	No.	Date	Tournament	Surface	Partner	Opponents	Score
Loss	1.	6 October 1996	Langenthal, Switzerland	Clay	(Switzerland) Andrea Schwarz	(Russia) Alina Jidkova (Czech Republic) Helena Vildová	4–6, 4–6
Loss	2.	15 June 1997	Bossonnens, Switzerland	Clay	(Switzerland) Laura Bao	(Netherlands) Kim Kilsdonk (Netherlands) Jolanda Mens	4–6, 2–6
Win	3.	14 June 1998	Lenzerheide, Switzerland	Clay	(Switzerland) Laura Bao	(Argentina) Paula Racedo (Switzerland) Emanuela Zardo	6–4, 6–0

== See also ==
- List of Switzerland Fed Cup team representatives
