= 1999 Wimbledon Championships =

- Date: 21 June – 4 July
- Edition: 113th
- Category: Grand Slam (ITF)
- Draw: 128S/64D/64XD
- Prize money: £7,595,330
- Surface: Grass
- Location: Church Road; SW19, Wimbledon, London, United Kingdom
- Venue: All England Lawn Tennis and Croquet Club

Champions

Men's singles
- (United States) Pete Sampras

Women's singles
- (United States) Lindsay Davenport

Men's doubles
- (India) Mahesh Bhupathi / (India) Leander Paes

Women's doubles
- (United States) Lindsay Davenport / (United States) Corina Morariu

Mixed doubles
- (India) Leander Paes / (United States) Lisa Raymond

Boys' singles
- (Austria) Jürgen Melzer

Girls' singles
- (Uzbekistan) Iroda Tulyaganova

Boys' doubles
- (Argentina) Guillermo Coria / (Argentina) David Nalbandian

Girls' doubles
- (Czech Republic) Dája Bedáňová / (Argentina) María Emilia Salerni
← 1998 ·	Wimbledon Championships	· 2000 →

The 1999 Wimbledon Championships was a tennis tournament played on grass courts at the All England Lawn Tennis and Croquet Club in Wimbledon, London in the United Kingdom. It was the 113th edition of the Wimbledon Championships and were held from 21 June to 4 July 1999.

== Prize money ==
The total prize money for 1999 championships was £7,595,330. The winner of the men's title earned £455,000 while the women's singles champion earned £409,500.

Event	W	F	SF	QF	Round of 16	Round of 32	Round of 64	Round of 128
Men's singles	£455,000							
Women's singles	£409,500							
Men's doubles *	£186,420							—
Women's doubles *	£167,770							—
Mixed doubles *	£79,180							—

_{* per team}

== Champions ==
=== Seniors ===
==== Men's singles ====
(United States) Pete Sampras defeated (United States) Andre Agassi, 6–3, 6–4, 7–5

- It was Sampras' 12th career Grand Slam singles title and his 6th at Wimbledon.

==== Women's singles ====
(United States) Lindsay Davenport defeated (Germany) Steffi Graf, 6–4, 7–5

- It was Davenport's 2nd career Grand Slam singles title and her 1st and only at Wimbledon.

==== Men's doubles ====
(India) Mahesh Bhupathi / (India) Leander Paes defeated (Netherlands) Paul Haarhuis / (United States) Jared Palmer, 6–7^{(10–12)}, 6–3, 6–4, 7–6^{(7–4)}

- It was Bhupathi's 2nd career Grand Slam doubles title and his 1st at Wimbledon. It was Paes' 2nd career Grand Slam doubles title and his 1st at Wimbledon.

==== Women's doubles ====
(United States) Lindsay Davenport / (United States) Corina Morariu defeated (South Africa) Mariaan de Swardt / (Ukraine) Elena Tatarkova, 6–4, 6–4

- It was Davenport's 3rd and last career Grand Slam doubles title and her 1st at Wimbledon. It was Morariu's 1st and only career Grand Slam doubles title.

==== Mixed doubles ====
(United States) Lisa Raymond / (India) Leander Paes defeated (Sweden) Jonas Björkman / (Russia) Anna Kournikova, 6–4, 3–6, 6–3

- It was Paes' 1st career Grand Slam mixed doubles title. It was Raymond's 2nd career Grand Slam mixed doubles title and her 1st at Wimbledon.

=== Juniors ===
==== Boys' singles ====
(Austria) Jürgen Melzer defeated (Denmark) Kristian Pless, 7–6^{(9–7)}, 6–3

==== Girls' singles ====
(Uzbekistan) Iroda Tulyaganova defeated (Russia) Lina Krasnoroutskaya, 7–6^{(7–3)}, 6–4

==== Boys' doubles ====
(Argentina) Guillermo Coria / (Argentina) David Nalbandian defeated (Bulgaria) Todor Enev / (Finland) Jarkko Nieminen, 7–5, 6–4

==== Girls' doubles ====
(Czech Republic) Dája Bedáňová / (Argentina) María Emilia Salerni defeated (Ukraine) Tatiana Perebiynis / (Uzbekistan) Iroda Tulyaganova, 6–1, 2–6, 6–2

== Singles seeds ==
=== Men's singles ===
1. (United States) Pete Sampras (champion)
2. (Australia) Patrick Rafter (semifinals, lost to Andre Agassi)
3. (Russia) Yevgeny Kafelnikov (third round, lost to Cédric Pioline)
4. (United States) Andre Agassi (final, lost to Pete Sampras)
5. (Netherlands) Richard Krajicek (third round, lost to Lorenzo Manta)
6. (United Kingdom) Tim Henman (semifinals, lost to Pete Sampras)
7. (Australia) Mark Philippoussis (quarterfinals, lost to Pete Sampras)
8. (United States) Todd Martin (quarterfinals, lost to Pat Rafter)
9. (United Kingdom) Greg Rusedski (fourth round, lost to Mark Philippoussis)
10. (Croatia) Goran Ivanišević (fourth round, lost to Todd Martin)
11. (Brazil) Gustavo Kuerten (quarterfinals, lost to Andre Agassi)
12. (Spain) Carlos Moyá (second round, lost to Jim Courier)
13. (Slovakia) Karol Kučera (fourth round, lost to Cédric Pioline)
14. (Germany) Tommy Haas (third round, lost to Wayne Arthurs)
15. (Germany) Nicolas Kiefer (second round, lost to Boris Becker)
16. (Spain) Félix Mantilla (second round, lost to Paul Goldstein)

=== Women's singles ===
1. (Switzerland) Martina Hingis (first round, lost to Jelena Dokic)
2. (Germany) Steffi Graf (final, lost to Lindsay Davenport)
3. (United States) Lindsay Davenport (champion)
4. (United States) Monica Seles (third round, lost to Mirjana Lučić)
5. (Czech Republic) Jana Novotná (quarterfinals, lost to Lindsay Davenport)
6. (United States) Venus Williams (quarterfinals, lost to Steffi Graf)
7. (Spain) Arantxa Sánchez Vicario (second round, lost to Lisa Raymond)
8. (France) Nathalie Tauziat (quarterfinals, lost to Mirjana Lučić)
9. (France) Mary Pierce (fourth round, lost to Jelena Dokic)
10. (United States) Serena Williams (withdrew before the tournament began)
11. (France) Julie Halard-Decugis (third round, lost to Alexandra Stevenson)
12. (South Africa) Amanda Coetzer (third round, lost to Kim Clijsters)
13. (France) Sandrine Testud (third round, lost to Tamarine Tanasugarn)
14. (Austria) Barbara Schett (fourth round, lost to Lindsay Davenport)
15. (Belgium) Dominique Van Roost (fourth round, lost to Nathalie Tauziat)
16. (Belarus) Natasha Zvereva (second round, lost to Tatiana Panova)
17. (Russia) Anna Kournikova (fourth round, lost to Venus Williams)

Preceded by 1999 French Open	Grand Slams	Succeeded by 1999 US Open
