= 1996 US Open – Men's singles qualifying =

Men's singles qualifying
- 1996 US Open

Events
Singles	men	women		boys	girls
Doubles	men	women	mixed	boys	girls
WC Singles	men	women	quad
WC Doubles	men	women	quad
Legends	men	women	mixed

Qualification
Singles	men	women
Doubles	men	women
- US Open

Players who neither had high enough rankings nor received wild cards to enter the main draw of the annual US Open Tennis Championships participated in a qualifying tournament held over several days before the event.

== Seeds ==
1. (France) Lionel Roux (second round)
2. (Spain) Ignacio Truyol-Turrion (second round)
3. -
4. (Netherlands) Dennis van Scheppingen (first round)
5. (South Africa) Neville Godwin (qualified)
6. (Italy) Cristiano Caratti (first round)
7. (Armenia) Sargis Sargsian (first round)
8. (Ecuador) Luis Morejón (second round)
9. (Italy) Gianluca Pozzi (qualified)
10. (Mexico) Alejandro Hernandez (second round)
11. (United States) Steve Bryan (first round)
12. (Senegal) Yahiya Doumbia (first round)
13. (Germany) Lars Burgsmüller (first round)
14. (India) Leander Paes (qualifying competition, lucky loser)
15. (Argentina) Franco Squillari (first round)
16. (Australia) Ben Ellwood (qualified)
17. (Brazil) Roberto Jabali (qualifying competition, lucky loser)
18. (Germany) Martin Sinner (qualifying competition)
19. (Czech Republic) David Škoch (qualifying competition, lucky loser)
20. (Argentina) Patricio Arnold (second round)
21. (Venezuela) Jimy Szymanski (qualifying competition, lucky loser)
22. (Italy) Vincenzo Santopadre (second round)
23. (France) Gérard Solvès (first round)
24. (Germany) Dirk Dier (qualified)
25. (Germany) Jörn Renzenbrink (first round)
26. (Egypt) Tamer El-Sawy (qualified)
27. (United Kingdom) Danny Sapsford (qualifying competition)
28. (Israel) Eyal Ran (second round)
29. (Argentina) Gastón Etlis (first round)
30. (Netherlands) Jacco Eltingh (qualifying competition)
31. (Ecuador) Pablo Campana (qualified)
32. (United Kingdom) Chris Wilkinson (second round)

== Qualifiers ==
1. (Ecuador) Pablo Campana
2. (United States) David Caldwell
3. (Switzerland) Filippo Veglio
4. (Brazil) Jaime Oncins
5. (South Africa) Neville Godwin
6. (South Africa) David Nainkin
7. (Australia) Pat Cash
8. (Egypt) Tamer El-Sawy
9. (Italy) Gianluca Pozzi
10. (Germany) Dirk Dier
11. (Romania) Andrei Pavel
12. (Germany) Tommy Haas
13. (France) Frederic Vitoux
14. (Paraguay) Ramón Delgado
15. (Australia) Peter Tramacchi
16. (Australia) Ben Ellwood

== Lucky losers ==
1. (Venezuela) Jimy Szymanski
2. (Brazil) Roberto Jabali
3. (India) Leander Paes
4. (Czech Republic) David Škoch

== Qualifying draw ==
Key

- Q = Qualifier
- WC = Wild card
- LL = Lucky loser
- Alt = Alternate
- ITF = ITF entry
- PR = Protected ranking
- SR = Special ranking
- SE = Special exempt
- JE = Junior exempt
- JR = Junior Accelerator Programme entrant
- CO = College Accelerator Programme entrant
- NG = Next Gen Accelerator Program entrant
- w/o = Walkover
- r = Retired
- d = Defaulted

=== First qualifier ===
First round
1	(France) Lionel Roux	4	6	6
(Argentina) Daniel Orsanic	6	4	0
(United Kingdom) Mark Petchey	3	3
(Zimbabwe) Wayne Black	6	6
(United Kingdom) Luke Milligan	3	2
(Romania) Răzvan Sabău	6	6
WC	(United States) Adam Peterson	6	6	4
31	(Ecuador) Pablo Campana	7	4	6

Second round
1	(France) Lionel Roux	2	6
(Zimbabwe) Wayne Black	6	7
(Romania) Răzvan Sabău	6	6	3
31	(Ecuador) Pablo Campana	7	4	6

Qualifying competition
(Zimbabwe) Wayne Black	4	4
31	(Ecuador) Pablo Campana	6	6

=== Second qualifier ===
First round
2	(Spain) Ignacio Truyol-Turrion	6	7
(United States) Christopher Pressley	2	5
(Argentina) Diego del Río	7	3	2
WC	(United States) David Caldwell	5	6	6
(Italy) Claudio Pistolesi	4	4
(Colombia) Mario Rincón	6	6
(United States) Stephen Herdoiza	4	0
32	(United Kingdom) Chris Wilkinson	6	6

Second round
2	(Spain) Ignacio Truyol-Turrion	6	1
WC	(United States) David Caldwell	7	6
(Colombia) Mario Rincón	6	6	6
32	(United Kingdom) Chris Wilkinson	7	3	4

Qualifying competition
WC	(United States) David Caldwell	6	6
(Colombia) Mario Rincón	0	4

=== Third qualifier ===
First round
Alt	(France) Pier Gauthier	6	6
(Sweden) Federico Rovai	2	2
(United Kingdom) Nick Gould	6	3	6
(South Africa) Robbie Koenig	4	6	4
(Switzerland) Filippo Veglio	6	3	6
(Romania) Gabriel Trifu	4	6	3
(United States) Geoff Grant	3	7	6
29	(Argentina) Gastón Etlis	6	6	3

Second round
Alt	(France) Pier Gauthier	2	7	6
(United Kingdom) Nick Gould	6	5	1
(Switzerland) Filippo Veglio	7	1	6
(United States) Geoff Grant	6	6	1

Qualifying competition
Alt	(France) Pier Gauthier	2	4
(Switzerland) Filippo Veglio	6	6

=== Fourth qualifier ===
First round
4	(Netherlands) Dennis van Scheppingen	4	3
(Mexico) Leonardo Lavalle	6	6
(Germany) Sascha Nensel	5	3
(Brazil) Jaime Oncins	7	6
WC	(United States) Paul Goldstein	4	6	0
(United States) Steve Campbell	6	4	6
(Nigeria) Sulieman Ladipo	6	4
30	(Netherlands) Jacco Eltingh	7	6

Second round
(Mexico) Leonardo Lavalle	6	6	1
(Brazil) Jaime Oncins	4	7	6
(United States) Steve Campbell	3	2
30	(Netherlands) Jacco Eltingh	6	6

Qualifying competition
(Brazil) Jaime Oncins	6	6
30	(Netherlands) Jacco Eltingh	4	4

=== Fifth qualifier ===
First round
5	(South Africa) Neville Godwin	6	6
(Netherlands) Martijn Belgraver	1	2
(South Africa) Chris Haggard	3	6	6
(France) Jérôme Hanquez	6	3	4
WC	(United States) Ryan Wolters	6	1
WC	(United States) Jeff Salzenstein	7	6
(Germany) Jan Weinzierl	3	6
28	(Israel) Eyal Ran	6	7

Second round
5	(South Africa) Neville Godwin	6	7
(South Africa) Chris Haggard	3	5
WC	(United States) Jeff Salzenstein	7	5	6
28	(Israel) Eyal Ran	6	7	2

Qualifying competition
5	(South Africa) Neville Godwin	6	6
WC	(United States) Jeff Salzenstein	0	4

=== Sixth qualifier ===
First round
6	(Italy) Cristiano Caratti	3	7	4
(United States) Glenn Weiner	6	6	6
(Austria) Gerald Mandl	5	5
(South Africa) David Nainkin	7	7
(United States) Michael Sell	6	1	7
(Venezuela) Maurice Ruah	4	6	5
(Australia) Mark Draper	4	4
27	(United Kingdom) Danny Sapsford	6	6

Second round
(United States) Glenn Weiner	4	7	4
(South Africa) David Nainkin	6	5	6
(United States) Michael Sell	2	1
27	(United Kingdom) Danny Sapsford	6	6

Qualifying competition
(South Africa) David Nainkin	6	5	6
27	(United Kingdom) Danny Sapsford	1	7	1

=== Seventh qualifier ===
First round
7	(Armenia) Sargis Sargsian	4	6
(India) Mahesh Bhupathi	6	7
(United States) Louis Gloria	1	2
(Spain) Tati Rascón	6	6
(Italy) Diego Nargiso	2	6
WC	(Australia) Pat Cash	6	7
(Mexico) Luis Herrera	3	7	6
25	(Germany) Jörn Renzenbrink	6	6	0

Second round
(India) Mahesh Bhupathi	6	0
(Spain) Tati Rascón	7	6
WC	(Australia) Pat Cash	6	6
(Mexico) Luis Herrera	0	2

Qualifying competition
(Spain) Tati Rascón	2	3
WC	(Australia) Pat Cash	6	6

=== Eighth qualifier ===
First round
8	(Ecuador) Luis Morejón	6	7
(Japan) Satoshi Iwabuchi	2	5
(United States) Ivan Baron	7	1	2
(United Kingdom) Andrew Richardson	5	6	6
(United Kingdom) David Draper	4	7	7
(Germany) Michael Geserer	6	5	6
(Germany) Björn Jacob	6	1	5
26	(Egypt) Tamer El-Sawy	4	6	7

Second round
8	(Ecuador) Luis Morejón	6	6
(United Kingdom) Andrew Richardson	7	7
(United Kingdom) David Draper	3	1
26	(Egypt) Tamer El-Sawy	6	6

Qualifying competition
(United Kingdom) Andrew Richardson	2	5
26	(Egypt) Tamer El-Sawy	6	7

=== Ninth qualifier ===
First round
9	(Italy) Gianluca Pozzi	6	1
(Australia) Grant Doyle	1	0^{r}
(Ivory Coast) Claude N'Goran	6	6	4
(United States) Rob Givone	4	7	6
(Italy) Mosé Navarra	6	6
(Israel) Noam Behr	3	4
(Germany) Lars Rehmann	6	7
23	(France) Gérard Solvès	4	6

Second round
9	(Italy) Gianluca Pozzi	6	7
(United States) Rob Givone	2	5
(Italy) Mosé Navarra	3	7	7
(Germany) Lars Rehmann	6	6	5

Qualifying competition
9	(Italy) Gianluca Pozzi	7	6
(Italy) Mosé Navarra	5	2

=== Tenth qualifier ===
First round
10	(Mexico) Alejandro Hernandez	6	6
(Japan) Yasufumi Yamamoto	1	1
(Australia) Paul Kilderry	6	5	2
(Japan) Gouichi Motomura	4	7	6
WC	(United States) Mashiska Washington	6	6
WC	(United States) Alex Reichel	3	4
(France) Olivier Delaître	1	4
24	(Germany) Dirk Dier	6	6

Second round
10	(Mexico) Alejandro Hernandez	1	4
(Japan) Gouichi Motomura	6	6
WC	(United States) Mashiska Washington	3	6	3
24	(Germany) Dirk Dier	6	3	6

Qualifying competition
(Japan) Gouichi Motomura	6	6	3
24	(Germany) Dirk Dier	7	2	6

=== Eleventh qualifier ===
First round
11	(United States) Steve Bryan	3	1
(Romania) Andrei Pavel	6	6
(Belarus) Max Mirnyi	5	6	3
(North Macedonia) Aleksandar Kitinov	7	4	6
(South Africa) David Adams	1	6	6
(United States) David DiLucia	6	4	2
(Italy) Massimo Ardinghi	3	5
21	(Venezuela) Jimy Szymanski	6	7

Second round
(Romania) Andrei Pavel	6	6
(North Macedonia) Aleksandar Kitinov	3	0
(South Africa) David Adams	6	6	2
21	(Venezuela) Jimy Szymanski	7	3	6

Qualifying competition
(Romania) Andrei Pavel	6	6
21	(Venezuela) Jimy Szymanski	1	3

=== Twelfth qualifier ===
First round
12	(Senegal) Yahiya Doumbia	6	4
(France) Stéphane Huet	7	6
(Poland) Wojciech Kowalski	6	3	1
(United States) Brian MacPhie	4	6	6
(Germany) Tommy Haas	6	7
(Canada) Albert Chang	3	5
(Switzerland) Lorenzo Manta	6	0^{r}
22	(Italy) Vincenzo Santopadre	3	1

Second round
(France) Stéphane Huet	6	6
(United States) Brian MacPhie	2	2
(Germany) Tommy Haas	7	7
22	(Italy) Vincenzo Santopadre	6	5

Qualifying competition
(France) Stéphane Huet	2	2
(Germany) Tommy Haas	6	6

=== Thirteenth qualifier ===
First round
13	(Germany) Lars Burgsmüller	6	1	1^{r}
(New Zealand) Steven Downs	4	6	0
(France) Frederic Vitoux	6	6
(France) Lionel Barthez	3	4
(Italy) Daniele Balducci	5	4
(Argentina) Guillermo Cañas	7	6
(Brazil) Nelson Aerts	0	2
19	(Czech Republic) David Škoch	6	6

Second round
(New Zealand) Steven Downs	2	0
(France) Frederic Vitoux	6	6
(Argentina) Guillermo Cañas	4	7	4
19	(Czech Republic) David Škoch	6	5	6

Qualifying competition
(France) Frederic Vitoux	6	6
19	(Czech Republic) David Škoch	0	2

=== Fourteenth qualifier ===
First round
14	(India) Leander Paes	6	7
(Federal Republic of Yugoslavia) Bojan Vujić	1	6
(Colombia) Miguel Tobón	6	7
WC	(South Africa) Donavan September	3	6
(Germany) Christian Vinck	6	4	1
(Paraguay) Ramón Delgado	1	6	6
(Mexico) Oscar Ortiz	3	6
20	(Argentina) Patricio Arnold	6	7

Second round
14	(India) Leander Paes	6	6
(Colombia) Miguel Tobón	2	2
(Paraguay) Ramón Delgado	7	6
20	(Argentina) Patricio Arnold	6	1

Qualifying competition
14	(India) Leander Paes	5	4
(Paraguay) Ramón Delgado	7	6

=== Fifteenth qualifier ===
First round
15	(Argentina) Franco Squillari	6	5	5
(Australia) Peter Tramacchi	4	7	7
(Czech Republic) Petr Pála	3	2
(United Kingdom) Colin Beecher	6	6
(United States) Mark Merklein	6	7
(Haiti) Ronald Agénor	0	6
(United States) Justin Gimelstob	6	3	5
17	(Brazil) Roberto Jabali	4	6	7

Second round
(Australia) Peter Tramacchi	5	6	7
(United Kingdom) Colin Beecher	7	4	6
(United States) Mark Merklein	3	7	3
17	(Brazil) Roberto Jabali	6	6	6

Qualifying competition
(Australia) Peter Tramacchi	6	6
17	(Brazil) Roberto Jabali	4	3

=== Sixteenth qualifier ===
First round
16	(Australia) Ben Ellwood	6	6
(Germany) Arne Thoms	1	3
(France) Maxime Huard	0	0^{r}
(Sweden) Fredrik Utgren	6	1
(United States) Bryan Shelton	6	6
(Sweden) Lars-Anders Wahlgren	4	3
(United States) Bill Behrens	3	1
18	(Germany) Martin Sinner	6	6

Second round
16	(Australia) Ben Ellwood	6	6
(Sweden) Fredrik Utgren	1	3
(United States) Bryan Shelton	6	6
18	(Germany) Martin Sinner	7	7

Qualifying competition
16	(Australia) Ben Ellwood	6	2	6
18	(Germany) Martin Sinner	4	6	2
