= 1996 US Open – Women's singles qualifying =

Women's singles qualifying
- 1996 US Open

Events
Singles	men	women		boys	girls
Doubles	men	women	mixed	boys	girls
WC Singles	men	women	quad
WC Doubles	men	women	quad
Legends	men	women	mixed

Qualification
Singles	men	women
Doubles	men	women
- US Open

Players who neither had high enough rankings nor received wild cards to enter the main draw of the annual US Open Tennis Championships participated in a qualifying tournament held over several days before the event.

== Seeds ==
1. (Belgium) Stephanie Devillé (qualified)
2. (Canada) Rene Simpson (first round)
3. (Poland) Aleksandra Olsza (qualified)
4. (Australia) Kerry-Anne Guse (second round)
5. (Czech Republic) Adriana Gerši (first round)
6. (Italy) Adriana Serra Zanetti (qualified)
7. (Argentina) Bettina Fulco (second round)
8. (Israel) Anna Smashnova (first round)
9. (Slovakia) Radka Zrubáková (qualified)
10. (Russia) Anna Kournikova (qualified)
11. (Australia) Annabel Ellwood (qualifying competition, lucky loser)
12. (Slovenia) Tina Križan (qualifying competition, lucky loser)
13. (Ukraine) Olga Lugina (first round)
14. (Argentina) Mercedes Paz (second round)
15. (France) Noëlle van Lottum (second round)
16. (Luxembourg) Anne Kremer (first round)

== Qualifiers ==
1. (Belgium) Stephanie Devillé
2. (Russia) Anna Kournikova
3. (United States) Laxmi Poruri
4. (Italy) Adriana Serra Zanetti
5. (Mexico) Angélica Gavaldón
6. (Poland) Aleksandra Olsza
7. (Slovakia) Radka Zrubáková
8. (Argentina) María José Gaidano

== Lucky losers ==
1. (Slovenia) Tina Križan
2. (Australia) Annabel Ellwood

== Qualifying draw ==
Key

- Q = Qualifier
- WC = Wild card
- LL = Lucky loser
- Alt = Alternate
- ITF = ITF entry
- PR = Protected ranking
- SR = Special ranking
- SE = Special exempt
- JE = Junior exempt
- JR = Junior Accelerator Programme entrant
- CO = College Accelerator Programme entrant
- NG = Next Gen Accelerator Program entrant
- w/o = Walkover
- r = Retired
- d = Defaulted

=== First qualifier ===
First round
1	(Belgium) Stephanie Devillé	6	6
(Japan) Yuka Yoshida	1	0
(Italy) Laura Golarsa	6	6
(Germany) Marketa Kochta	0	1
(Australia) Rachel McQuillan	6	6
(United States) Janet Lee	4	3
WC	(United States) Melissa Zimpfer	0	0
15	(France) Noëlle van Lottum	6	6

Second round
1	(Belgium) Stephanie Devillé	6	6
(Italy) Laura Golarsa	4	1
(Australia) Rachel McQuillan	6	1	6
15	(France) Noëlle van Lottum	3	6	1

Qualifying competition
1	(Belgium) Stephanie Devillé	2	6	7^{7}
(Australia) Rachel McQuillan	6	2	6^{4}

=== Second qualifier ===
First round
10	(Russia) Anna Kournikova	6	6
(Canada) Jana Nejedly	1	2
(Poland) Katarzyna Nowak	4	4
(Hungary) Virág Csurgó	6	6
(Greece) Christína Papadáki	7^{7}	6
(France) Lea Ghirardi	6^{1}	2
(Netherlands) Seda Noorlander	6	6
8	(Israel) Anna Smashnova	2	3

Second round
10	(Russia) Anna Kournikova	7^{7}	6
(Hungary) Virág Csurgó	6^{1}	3
(Greece) Christína Papadáki	3	7^{7}	4
(Netherlands) Seda Noorlander	6	6^{1}	2^{r}

Qualifying competition
10	(Russia) Anna Kournikova	6	7^{7}
(Greece) Christína Papadáki	2	6^{2}

=== Third qualifier ===
First round
4	(Australia) Kerry-Anne Guse	6	6
(Russia) Julia Lutrova	2	3
(United States) Laxmi Poruri	6	6
(United Kingdom) Clare Wood	3	0
(Georgia (country)) Nino Louarsabishvili	6	6
(Australia) Nicole Pratt	2	4
WC	(United States) Samantha Reeves	7	2	2
14	(Argentina) Mercedes Paz	5	6	6

Second round
4	(Australia) Kerry-Anne Guse	1	3
(United States) Laxmi Poruri	6	6
(Georgia (country)) Nino Louarsabishvili	7	6
14	(Argentina) Mercedes Paz	5	0

Qualifying competition
(United States) Laxmi Poruri	3	6	6
(Georgia (country)) Nino Louarsabishvili	6	2	1

=== Fourth qualifier ===
First round
11	(Australia) Annabel Ellwood	6	6
(France) Caroline Dhenin	1	0
(Venezuela) María Vento	6	6
(Hungary) Katalin Marosi	4	1
(United States) Erika deLone	6	6
(United Kingdom) Rachel Viollet	3	1
(Canada) Sonya Jeyaseelan	3	6	4
6	(Italy) Adriana Serra Zanetti	6	4	6

Second round
11	(Australia) Annabel Ellwood	6	6
(Venezuela) María Vento	4	2
(United States) Erika deLone	6	2	6^{2}
6	(Italy) Adriana Serra Zanetti	4	6	7^{7}

Qualifying competition
11	(Australia) Annabel Ellwood	6	3	2
6	(Italy) Adriana Serra Zanetti	0	6	6

=== Fifth qualifier ===
First round
5	(Czech Republic) Adriana Gerši	4	4
(Hungary) Petra Gáspár	6	6
(France) Amélie Cocheteux	3	7^{7}	2
(Ukraine) Elena Brioukhovets	6	6^{4}	6
(Hungary) Andrea Temesvári	4	4
(Ukraine) Elena Tatarkova	6	6
(Mexico) Angélica Gavaldón	6	6
16	(Luxembourg) Anne Kremer	2	2

Second round
(Hungary) Petra Gáspár	6	6
(Ukraine) Elena Brioukhovets	3	3
(Ukraine) Elena Tatarkova	1	4
(Mexico) Angélica Gavaldón	6	6

Qualifying competition
(Hungary) Petra Gáspár	1	6	3
(Mexico) Angélica Gavaldón	6	3	6

=== Sixth qualifier ===
First round
12	(Slovenia) Tina Križan	6	6
(Czech Republic) Lenka Cenková	4	4
(Sweden) Maria Strandlund	6	6
WC	(United States) Kelly Pace	4	4
(Australia) Kristine Kunce	0	6	6
(Czech Republic) Lenka Němečková	6	4	2
WC	(United States) Christine Neuman	1	4
3	(Poland) Aleksandra Olsza	6	6

Second round
12	(Slovenia) Tina Križan	7	6
(Sweden) Maria Strandlund	5	2
(Australia) Kristine Kunce	4	2
3	(Poland) Aleksandra Olsza	6	6

Qualifying competition
12	(Slovenia) Tina Križan	1	5
3	(Poland) Aleksandra Olsza	6	7

=== Seventh qualifier ===
First round
7	(Argentina) Bettina Fulco	6	4	7
WC	(United States) Jeri Ingram	2	6	5
(Canada) Maureen Drake	6	6
(Slovakia) Denisa Krajčovičová	3	2
(Belarus) Olga Barabanschikova	6	7^{7}
WC	(United States) Mashona Washington	4	6^{2}
WC	(United States) Stephanie Mabry	3	4
9	(Slovakia) Radka Zrubáková	6	6

Second round
7	(Argentina) Bettina Fulco	1	3
(Canada) Maureen Drake	6	6
(Belarus) Olga Barabanschikova	4	4
9	(Slovakia) Radka Zrubáková	6	6

Qualifying competition
(Canada) Maureen Drake	2	6	5
9	(Slovakia) Radka Zrubáková	6	3	7

=== Eighth qualifier ===
First round
13	(Ukraine) Olga Lugina	3	0
(Japan) Miho Saeki	6	6
WC	(United States) Tara Snyder	6	7
(United States) Karin Miller	2	5
(Argentina) María José Gaidano	6	6
(Spain) Paula Hermida	4	4
(United States) Meilen Tu	3	6	6
2	(Canada) Rene Simpson	6	1	4

Second round
(Japan) Miho Saeki	6	6^{4}	7
WC	(United States) Tara Snyder	0	7^{7}	5
(Argentina) María José Gaidano	6	6
(United States) Meilen Tu	2	4

Qualifying competition
(Japan) Miho Saeki	6^{3}	1
(Argentina) María José Gaidano	7^{7}	6
