= 1996 US Open – Women's doubles qualifying =

Women's doubles qualifying
- 1996 US Open

Events
Singles	men	women		boys	girls
Doubles	men	women	mixed	boys	girls
WC Singles	men	women	quad
WC Doubles	men	women	quad
Legends	men	women	mixed

Qualification
Singles	men	women
Doubles	men	women
- US Open

The qualifying rounds for the 1996 US Open were played from 22 to 25 August 1996 at the USTA National Tennis Center in Flushing Meadows, New York City, United States.

== Seeds ==
1. (Ukraine) Elena Brioukhovets / (Ukraine) Elena Tatarkova (first round)
2. (Hungary) Virág Csurgó / (Poland) Magdalena Grzybowska (qualifying competition, lucky losers)
3. (United States) Elly Hakami / (United Kingdom) Valda Lake (first round)
4. (France) Caroline Dhenin / (Australia) Danielle Jones (first round)
5. (Russia) Julia Lutrova / (Thailand) Tamarine Tanasugarn (first round)
6. (Argentina) Bettina Fulco-Villella / (Italy) Flora Perfetti (first round)
7. (Australia) Jenny Byrne / (Australia) Tracey Morton-Rodgers (qualifying competition, lucky losers)
8. (Japan) Kaoru Shibata / (France) Noëlle van Lottum (qualifying competition)

== Qualifiers ==
1. (South Africa) Liezel Horn / (South Africa) Joannette Kruger
2. (United States) Jane Chi / (United States) Kelly Pace
3. (Japan) Miho Saeki / (Japan) Yuka Yoshida
4. (Argentina) María Fernanda Landa / (Germany) Marlene Weingärtner

== Lucky losers ==
1. (Hungary) Virág Csurgó / (Poland) Magdalena Grzybowska
2. (Australia) Jenny Byrne / (Australia) Tracey Morton-Rodgers

== Draw ==
=== First qualifier ===
First round
1	(Ukraine) Elena Brioukhovets (Ukraine) Elena Tatarkova	6^{5}	5
(South Africa) Liezel Horn (South Africa) Joannette Kruger	7^{7}	7
(United States) Shannan McCarthy (United States) Julie Steven	3	6	6^{5}
7	(Australia) Jenny Byrne (Australia) Tracey Morton-Rodgers	6	3	7^{7}

Qualifying competition
(South Africa) Liezel Horn (South Africa) Joannette Kruger	4	6	6
7	(Australia) Jenny Byrne (Australia) Tracey Morton-Rodgers	6	4	4

=== Second qualifier ===
First round
2	(Hungary) Virág Csurgó (Poland) Magdalena Grzybowska	w	/	o
WC	(United States) Sandra Cacic (United States) Annie Miller
(United States) Jane Chi (United States) Kelly Pace	6	6
5	(Russia) Julia Lutrova (Thailand) Tamarine Tanasugarn	3	2

Qualifying competition
2	(Hungary) Virág Csurgó (Poland) Magdalena Grzybowska	3	3
(United States) Jane Chi (United States) Kelly Pace	6	6

=== Third qualifier ===
First round
3	(United States) Elly Hakami (United Kingdom) Valda Lake	4	5
(Japan) Miho Saeki (Japan) Yuka Yoshida	6	7
WC	(United States) Katie Schlukebir (United States) Melissa Zimpfer	3	6	3
8	(Japan) Kaoru Shibata (France) Noëlle van Lottum	6	2	6

Qualifying competition
(Japan) Miho Saeki (Japan) Yuka Yoshida	7^{7}	6
8	(Japan) Kaoru Shibata (France) Noëlle van Lottum	6^{4}	4

=== Fourth qualifier ===
First round
4	(France) Caroline Dhenin (Australia) Danielle Jones	5	0
(Belgium) Stephanie Devillé (Georgia (country)) Nino Louarsabishvili	7	6
Alt	(Argentina) María Fernanda Landa (Germany) Marlene Weingärtner	6	2	6
6	(Argentina) Bettina Fulco-Villella (Italy) Flora Perfetti	4	6	2

Qualifying competition
(Belgium) Stephanie Devillé (Georgia (country)) Nino Louarsabishvili	7	0	3
Alt	(Argentina) María Fernanda Landa (Germany) Marlene Weingärtner	5	6	6
