= 1996 US Open – Men's doubles qualifying =

Men's doubles qualifying
- 1996 US Open

Events
Singles	men	women		boys	girls
Doubles	men	women	mixed	boys	girls
WC Singles	men	women	quad
WC Doubles	men	women	quad
Legends	men	women	mixed

Qualification
Singles	men	women
Doubles	men	women
- US Open

Players and pairs who neither have high enough rankings nor receive wild cards may participate in a qualifying tournament held one week before the annual US Open.

== Seeds ==
1. (India) Mahesh Bhupathi / (India) Leander Paes (first round)
2. (Sweden) Ola Kristiansson / (Sweden) Mårten Renström (first round)
3. (United States) Bill Behrens / (United States) Geoff Grant (first round)
4. (Mexico) Alejandro Hernández / (Mexico) Óscar Ortiz (first round)
5. (n/a)
6. (Mexico) Leonardo Lavalle / (Venezuela) Maurice Ruah (qualifying competition, lucky losers)
7. (North Macedonia) Aleksandar Kitinov / (Italy) Mosé Navarra (first round)
8. (South Africa) Clinton Ferreira / (Romania) Andrei Pavel (qualified)

== Qualifiers ==
1. (Italy) Stefano Pescosolido / (Italy) Vincenzo Santopadre
2. (South Africa) Clinton Ferreira / (Romania) Andrei Pavel
3. (Ecuador) Nicolás Lapentti / (Argentina) Daniel Orsanic
4. (Australia) Scott Draper / (United States) Kenny Thorne

== Lucky losers ==
1. (Mexico) Leonardo Lavalle / (Venezuela) Maurice Ruah

== Draw ==
=== First qualifier ===
First round
1	(India) Mahesh Bhupathi (India) Leander Paes	4	6	3
WC	(United States) Paul Goldstein (United States) Ryan Wolters	6	0	6
(Italy) Stefano Pescosolido (Italy) Vincenzo Santopadre	7	6
7	(North Macedonia) Aleksandar Kitinov (Italy) Mosé Navarra	6	3

Qualifying competition
WC	(United States) Paul Goldstein (United States) Ryan Wolters	3	1
(Italy) Stefano Pescosolido (Italy) Vincenzo Santopadre	6	6

=== Second qualifier ===
First round
2	(Sweden) Ola Kristiansson (Sweden) Mårten Renström	6	4
WC	(United States) Adam Peterson (United States) Jim Thomas	7	6
(Zimbabwe) Wayne Black (South Africa) Chris Haggard	6	1	6
8	(South Africa) Clinton Ferreira (Romania) Andrei Pavel	4	6	7

Qualifying competition
WC	(United States) Adam Peterson (United States) Jim Thomas	3	2
8	(South Africa) Clinton Ferreira (Romania) Andrei Pavel	6	6

=== Third qualifier ===
First round
3	(United States) Bill Behrens (United States) Geoff Grant	7	6	1
(Ecuador) Nicolás Lapentti (Argentina) Daniel Orsanic	5	7	6
(France) Lionel Barthez (Italy) Nicola Bruno	2	2
6	(Mexico) Leonardo Lavalle (Venezuela) Maurice Ruah	6	6

Qualifying competition
(Ecuador) Nicolás Lapentti (Argentina) Daniel Orsanic	6	6
6	(Mexico) Leonardo Lavalle (Venezuela) Maurice Ruah	3	4

=== Fourth qualifier ===
First round
4	(Mexico) Alejandro Hernández (Mexico) Óscar Ortiz	7	4	4
(Australia) Scott Draper (United States) Kenny Thorne	6	6	6
WC	(United States) David DiLucia (United States) Scott Humphries	6	6
Alt	(Australia) Ben Ellwood (Australia) Peter Tramacchi	4	4

Qualifying competition
(Australia) Scott Draper (United States) Kenny Thorne	6	7
WC	(United States) David DiLucia (United States) Scott Humphries	3	5
