= Jon Leach =

American tennis player and investment banker

- Full name: Jonathan Leach
- Country (sports): United States
- Born: April 18, 1973 (age 53)
- Plays: Right-handed

Doubles
- Career record: 3–6
- Career titles: 0
- Highest ranking: No. 229 (August 5, 1996)

Grand Slam doubles results
- US Open: 2R (1995)

Grand Slam mixed doubles results
- US Open: 1R (1996)

Jonathan Leach (born April 18, 1973) is a former professional tennis player from the United States. He is the husband of Lindsay Davenport.

== Professional career ==
Leach, an All-American player at USC, made his Grand Slam debut at the 1991 US Open when he partnered David Witt in the men's doubles. He competed in the doubles at Indian Wells in 1992 with Brian MacPhie and before exiting in the second round they defeated a seeded pairing of Luke Jensen and Laurie Warder. A doubles specialist, his only singles appearance came at Indian Wells in 1994. With Brett Hansen-Dent as his partner, Leach made the second round of the 1995 US Open, with a win over Dutch players Richard Krajicek and Jan Siemerink. At the 1996 US Open, his third and final appearance at the tournament, Leach partnered with his brother Rick. He also played in the mixed doubles, with Amy Frazier. His only doubles title on the ATP Challenger Tour came at Weiden, Germany in 1996.

== Personal life ==
The son of former USC tennis coach Dick Leach, he was brought up in California and went to Laguna Beach High School. Leach married tennis player Lindsay Davenport in Hawaii on April 25, 2003. Their first child, a son named Jagger, was born in 2007. In addition to Jagger they have had three more children, all daughters, after him. An investment banker, Leach is also involved in coaching and worked with young American player Madison Keys in the 2015 season. His elder brother, Rick Leach, was also a professional tennis player, who won five Grand Slam doubles titles and reached number one in the world for doubles.

== Challenger titles ==
=== Doubles: (1) ===
No.	Year	Tournament	Surface	Partner	Opponents	Score
1.	1996	Weiden, Germany	Clay	(Italy) Mosé Navarra	(Latvia) Ģirts Dzelde (Sweden) Tomas Nydahl	7–6, 7–5
