= Roberto Jabali =

Brazilian tennis player

- Country (sports): Brazil
- Residence: Ribeirão Preto, Brazil
- Born: 16 May 1970 (age 56) Ribeirão Preto, Brazil
- Height: 1.90 m (6 ft 3 in)
- Turned pro: 1988
- Retired: 1998
- Plays: Right-handed (two-handed backhand)
- Prize money: $277,807

Singles
- Career record: 12–22 (at ATP Tour level, Grand Slam level, and in Davis Cup)
- Career titles: 0; 5 Challenger, 0 Futures
- Highest ranking: No. 130 (29 Jul 1996)

Grand Slam singles results
- Australian Open: Q1 (1997)
- French Open: Q1 (1993, 1994, 1996)
- Wimbledon: Q1 (1998)
- US Open: 1R (1996)

Doubles
- Career record: 1–3 (at ATP Tour level, Grand Slam level, and in Davis Cup)
- Career titles: 0; 0 Challenger, 1 Futures
- Highest ranking: No. 355 (1 May 1989)
- Last updated on: Apr 4 2026.

Roberto Aude Jabali (born 16 May 1970) is a Brazilian former professional tennis player.

== Career ==
Jabali was a semi-finalist in the boys' singles event at the 1988 French Open and also made the final of the Banana Bowl that year.

He runner-up in the 1994 Mexican Open, as a qualifier, losing the final to reigning champion Thomas Muster. The Brazilian defeated world number 32 and second seed Mikael Pernfors at the 1994 U.S. Men's Clay Court Championships.

In the 1996 US Open, Jabali lost his final qualifying match to Australian Peter Tramacchi, but entered the main draw as a lucky loser. He lost in straight sets to Tim Henman in the opening round. It would be his only Grand Slam appearance.

== ATP career finals ==
=== Singles: 1 (0 wins, 1 runner-up) ===
Legend Grand Slam Tournaments (0–0) ATP World Tour Finals (0–0) ATP World Tour Masters Series (0–0) ATP Championship Series (0–0) ATP World Series (0–1)	Finals by surface Hard (0–0) Clay (0–1) Grass (0–0) Carpet (0–0)	Finals by setting Outdoors (0–1) Indoors (0–0)

Result	W–L	Date	Tournament	Tier	Surface	Opponent	Score
Loss	0–1	Feb 1994	Mexico City, Mexico	World Series	Clay	(Austria) Thomas Muster	3–6, 1–6

== ATP Challenger and ITF Futures finals ==
=== Singles: 7 (5–2) ===
Legend ATP Challenger (5–2) ITF Futures (0–0)	Finals by surface Hard (2–2) Clay (3–0) Grass (0–0) Carpet (0–0)

Result	W–L	Date	Tournament	Tier	Surface	Opponent	Score
Win	1–0	Jul 1989	São Paulo, Brazil	Challenger	Clay	(Spain) Borja Uribe	6–2, 2–6, 7–5
Win	2–0	May 1991	Ribeirão Preto, Brazil	Challenger	Clay	(Chile) Felipe Rivera	6–3, 4–6, 7–6
Loss	2–1	Sep 1992	Guarujá, Brazil	Challenger	Hard	(Venezuela) Nicolas Pereira	4–6, 4–6
Loss	2–2	Aug 1995	Brasília, Brazil	Challenger	Hard	(India) Leander Paes	1–6, 7–5, 4–6
Win	3–2	Jun 1996	Bogotá, Colombia	Challenger	Clay	(Cuba) Juan Pino	6–7, 6–4, 6–1
Win	4–2	Jul 1996	São Paulo, Brazil	Challenger	Hard	(Mexico) Alejandro Hernández	6–2, 4–6, 6–1
Win	5–2	Aug 1997	Belo Horizonte, Brazil	Challenger	Hard	(Brazil) André Sá	2–6, 7–5, 6–3

=== Doubles: 1 (1–0) ===
Legend ATP Challenger (0–0) ITF Futures (1–0)	Finals by surface Hard (0–0) Clay (1–0) Grass (0–0) Carpet (0–0)

Result	W–L	Date	Tournament	Tier	Surface	Partner	Opponents	Score
Win	1–0	Aug 2008	Brazil F13, São Paulo	Futures	Clay	(Brazil) Adriano Ferreira	(Brazil) Tiago Lopes (Brazil) Diego Matos	6–2, 7–5

== Performance Timelines ==
Key
W	F	SF	QF	#R	RR	Q#	P#	DNQ	A	Z#	PO	G	S	B	NMS	NTI	P	NH

(W) winner; (F) finalist; (SF) semifinalist; (QF) quarterfinalist; (#R) rounds 4, 3, 2, 1; (RR) round-robin stage; (Q#) qualification round; (P#) preliminary round; (DNQ) did not qualify; (A) absent; (Z#) Davis/Fed Cup Zonal Group (with number indication) or (PO) play-off; (G) gold, (S) silver or (B) bronze Olympic/Paralympic medal; (NMS) not a Masters tournament; (NTI) not a Tier I tournament; (P) postponed; (NH) not held; (SR) strike rate (events won / competed); (W–L) win–loss record.

=== Singles ===
Tournament	1992	1993	1994	1995	1996	1997	1998	SR	W–L	Win %
Grand Slam tournaments
Australian Open	A	A	A	A	A	Q1	A	0 / 0	0–0	–
French Open	A	Q1	Q1	A	Q1	A	A	0 / 0	0–0	–
Wimbledon	A	A	A	A	A	A	Q1	0 / 0	0–0	–
US Open	Q1	Q1	A	A	1R	Q1	A	0 / 1	0–1	0%
Win–loss	0–0	0–0	0–0	0–0	0–1	0–0	0–0	0 / 1	0–1	0%
ATP Masters 1000 Series
Indian Wells	A	A	A	A	Q2	A	A	0 / 0	0–0	–
Miami	A	A	A	Q2	2R	Q2	1R	0 / 2	1–2	33%
Rome	A	A	A	A	Q3	A	A	0 / 0	0–0	–
Win–loss	0–0	0–0	0–0	0–0	1–1	0–0	0–1	0 / 2	1–2	33%
