= Frédéric Vitoux (tennis) =

French tennis player

- Country (sports): France
- Residence: Martigues
- Born: 30 October 1970 (age 55) Versailles, France
- Height: 1.73 m (5 ft 8 in)
- Turned pro: 1990
- Plays: Right-handed
- Prize money: $133,362

Singles
- Career record: 2–10 (at ATP Tour level, Grand Slam level, and in Davis Cup)
- Career titles: 0; 0 Challenger, 0 Futures
- Highest ranking: No. 144 (15 Jan 1996)

Grand Slam singles results
- Australian Open: Q1 (1995)
- French Open: 1R (1990, 1993, 1995)
- US Open: 2R (1996)

Doubles
- Career record: 0–0 (at ATP Tour level, Grand Slam level, and in Davis Cup)
- Career titles: 0; 0 Challenger, 0 Futures
- Highest ranking: No. 612 (17 May 1993)
- Last updated on: 16 May 2026.

Frédéric Vitoux (born 30 October 1970) is a former professional tennis player from France. He is a member of the Union nationale des joueurs professionnels de tennis (UNJPT), and part of the "after-tennis" committee of the DTN (Direction technique nationale) of the Fédération Française De Tennis (FFT).

Vitoux made his Grand Slam debut in the 1990 French Open and was beaten in the opening round by Soviet player Andrei Cherkasov. He made two further French Open appearances and was eliminated in the first round again in each, to Michael Chang and Andrei Medvedev. The Frenchman qualified for the US Open in 1996 and registered his first ever Grand Slam win when he accounted for fellow qualifier Ramón Delgado in the opening round. He was then eliminated in the second round by David Wheaton in four sets.

It wasn't until 1994 that he appeared in an ATP Tour event that wasn't a Grand Slam. He made the second round of the 1996 Abierto Mexicano de Tenis tournament in Mexico City.

== ATP Challenger and ITF Futures finals ==
=== Singles: 3 (0–3) ===
Legend ATP Challenger (0–3) ITF Futures (0–0)	Finals by surface Hard (0–2) Clay (0–1) Grass (0–0) Carpet (0–0)

Result	W–L	Date	Tournament	Tier	Surface	Opponent	Score
Loss	0–1	Aug 1994	Brasília, Brazil	Challenger	Hard	(Italy) Laurence Tieleman	6–2, 6–7, 4–6
Loss	0–2	Aug 1995	Istanbul, Turkey	Challenger	Hard	(United Kingdom) Miles MacLagan	6–7, 7–5, 2–6
Loss	0–3	Sep 1995	Naples, Italy	Challenger	Clay	(Sweden) Thomas Johansson	0–6, 0–6
