= Jane Chi =

American tennis player

- Country (sports): Chinese Taipei; United States
- Born: June 21, 1974 (age 52) El Paso, Texas, U.S.
- Height: 5 ft 5 in (1.65 m)
- Turned pro: 1995
- Retired: 2003
- Plays: Right-handed
- Prize money: $250,663

Singles
- Career record: 184–153
- Career titles: 6 ITF
- Highest ranking: No. 62 (April 26, 1999)

Grand Slam singles results
- Australian Open: 2R (1999)
- French Open: 1R (1999)
- Wimbledon: 1R (1999)
- US Open: 2R (1996, 1999)

Doubles
- Career record: 61–74
- Career titles: 2 ITF
- Highest ranking: No. 178 (November 23, 1998)

Grand Slam doubles results
- US Open: 1R (1996)
Medal record
Women's tennis
Representing Chinese Taipei
Asian Games
Bronze medal – third place	1994 Hiroshima	Women's Team

Jane Chi (Chinese: 戚蓮芝; born June 21, 1974) is a former professional tennis player from the United States.

== Early career ==
Chi was born in El Paso, Texas, to parents Steven and Ling. At the age of 11 she started playing tennis and after graduating from high school in 1992 played collegially at the University of California, Los Angeles. She attended the university for three years, while studying for a political science degree, during which time he earned multiple All-American honors. Her regular doubles partner was younger sister Stephanie.

In 1994 she played internationally for Chinese Taipei, first in a Fed Cup World Group tie against Indonesia in Frankfurt, then at the Asian Games in Hiroshima, where she won a bronze medal in the team competition.

During the 1995 season, her last for UCLA, Chi was America's top ranked player in college tennis, ending with a No. 3 ranking.

== Professional tennis ==
From 1995 she competed on the professional circuit. At the 1996 US Open she made her Grand Slam debut and reached the second round, with a win over María Sánchez Lorenzo. She was a semifinalist at the 1998 Challenge Bell, a WTA Tour tournament in Quebec City. Her run included an upset win over second seed Sandrine Testud. Her only other WTA Tour semifinal was at the Japan Open in 1999, a year in which she reached her career best ranking of 62 in the world, with second round appearances at both the Australian Open and US Open. After retiring from tennis she earned a Doctor of Law degree at the University of Idaho and now works in Seattle.

== ITF finals ==
Legend
$50,000 tournaments
$25,000 tournaments
$10,000 tournaments

=== Singles (6–3) ===
Outcome	No.	Date	Tournament	Surface	Opponent	Score
Winner	1.	15 October 1995	Tokyo, Japan	Hard	(Japan) Yuki Fujii	6–0, 6–1
Winner	2.	22 October 1995	Kugayama, Japan	Hard	(Australia) Trudi Musgrave	7–5, 6–1
Winner	3.	29 October 1995	Kyoto, Japan	Hard	(China) Wen-yuan	4–6, 6–2, 7–5
Winner	4.	19 November 1995	Manila, Philippines	Hard	(South Korea) Kim Soon-nam	7–5, 6–3
Winner	5.	23 June 1996	Peachtree City, United States	Hard	(United States) Stephanie Mabry	6–1, 3–6, 7–5
Winner	6.	5 August 1996	Austin, United States	Hard	(Belarus) Olga Barabanschikova	6–2, 4–6, 6–2
Runner-up	7.	17 May 1998	Grenelefe, United States	Hard	(Belgium) Justine Henin	2–6, 3–6
Runner-up	8.	11 October 1998	Albuquerque, United States	Hard	(Luxembourg) Anne Kremer	6–2, 4–6, 4–6
Runner-up	9.	28 January 2001	Miami, United States	Hard	(Argentina) Gisela Dulko	7–5, 3–6, 6–7

=== Doubles (2–5) ===
Outcome	No.	Date	Tournament	Surface	Partner	Opponents	Score
Winner	1.	26 June 1995	Hilton Head, United States	Hard	(Chinese Taipei) Stephanie Chi	(United States) Tina Samara (United States) Stacy Sheppard	6–3, 7–6^{(5)}
Runner-up	2.	15 October 1995	Tokyo, Japan	Hard	(United States) Mindy Weiner	(Japan) Keiko Nagatomi (Japan) Yoshiko Sasano	2–6, 2–6
Runner-up	3.	28 July 1996	Fayetteville, United States	Hard	(United States) Kelly Pace-Wilson	(Canada) Sonya Jeyaseelan (Canada) Rene Simpson	6–3, 4–6, 2–6
Winner	4.	26 January 1997	San Antonio, United States	Hard	(United States) Kelly Pace-Wilson	(United States) Keirsten Alley (United States) Pam Nelson	6–4, 4–6, 6–4
Runner-up	5.	19 July 1998	Mahwah, United States	Hard	(United States) Jean Okada	(United States) Amy Frazier (Japan) Rika Hiraki	6–4, 4–6, 4–6
Runner-up	6.	22 January 2001	Miami, United States	Hard	(Russia) Lioudmila Skavronskaia	(Russia) Evgenia Kulikovskaya (United States) Jolene Watanabe	2–6, 4–6
Runner-up	7.	11 June 2001	Mount Pleasant, United States	Hard	(Russia) Lioudmila Skavronskaia	(South Korea) Choi Young-ja (South Korea) Jeon Mi-ra	7–6^{(2)}, 2–6, 2–6
