= 1997 Australian Open – Men's singles =

Men's singles
- 1997 Australian Open

Final
- Champion: (United States) Pete Sampras
- Runner-up: (Spain) Carlos Moyá
- Score: 6–2, 6–3, 6–3

Details
- Draw: 128
- Seeds: 16

Events
Singles	men	women		boys	girls
Doubles	men	women	mixed	boys	girls
WC Singles	men	women	quad
WC Doubles	men	women	quad
Legends	men	women	mixed
- Australian Open

Pete Sampras defeated Carlos Moyá in the final, 6–2, 6–3, 6–3 to win the men's singles tennis title at the 1997 Australian Open. It was his second Australian Open title and ninth major title overall.

Boris Becker was the defending champion, but lost in the first round to Moyá. Becker was the first major champion in the Open Era to lose in the first round during a title defense. This was also the two-time champion's final Australian Open appearance.

This tournament marked the major main draw debut of future world No. 1 and two-time major singles champion Lleyton Hewitt. He would compete in the Australian Open for a record twenty consecutive years.

== Seeds ==
1. (United States) Pete Sampras (champion)
2. (United States) Michael Chang (semifinals)
3. (Croatia) Goran Ivanišević (quarterfinals)
4. (Russia) ~~Yevgeny Kafelnikov~~ (withdrew)
5. (Austria) Thomas Muster (semifinals)
6. (Germany) Boris Becker (first round)
7. (Sweden) Thomas Enqvist (fourth round)
8. (South Africa) Wayne Ferreira (fourth round)
9. (Chile) Marcelo Ríos (quarterfinals)
10. (Spain) Albert Costa (quarterfinals)
11. (United States) Jim Courier (fourth round)
12. (Sweden) Magnus Gustafsson (second round)
13. (Netherlands) Jan Siemerink (first round)
14. (Spain) Félix Mantilla (quarterfinals)
15. (Germany) Michael Stich (second round)
16. (Spain) Alberto Berasategui (third round)

== Draw ==
Key

- Q = Qualifier
- WC = Wild card
- LL = Lucky loser
- Alt = Alternate
- ITF = ITF entry
- PR = Protected ranking
- SR = Special ranking
- SE = Special exempt
- JE = Junior exempt
- JR = Junior Accelerator Programme entrant
- CO = College Accelerator Programme entrant
- NG = Next Gen Accelerator Program entrant
- w/o = Walkover
- r = Retired
- d = Defaulted

=== Finals ===
Quarterfinals
1	(United States) Pete Sampras	6	6^{5}	6	3	6
10	(Spain) Albert Costa	3	7^{7}	1	6	2
3	(Croatia) Goran Ivanišević	4	2	3
5	(Austria) Thomas Muster	6	6	6
(Spain) Carlos Moyà	7	6	6^{5}	6
14	(Spain) Félix Mantilla	5	2	7^{7}	2
9	(Chile) Marcelo Ríos	5	1	4
2	(United States) Michael Chang	7	6	6

Semifinals
1	(United States) Pete Sampras	6	7^{7}	6
5	(Austria) Thomas Muster	1	6^{3}	3
(Spain) Carlos Moyà	7	6	6
2	(United States) Michael Chang	5	2	4

Final
1	(United States) Pete Sampras	6	6	6
(Spain) Carlos Moyà	2	3	3

=== Top half ===
==== Section 1 ====
First round
1	(United States) P Sampras	6	6	6
Q	(Romania) D Pescariu	2	4	2
(Romania) A Voinea	6	6	4	6
(Germany) H Dreekmann	2	1	6	4
(Australia) M Woodforde	6	6	7
WC	(Australia) M Tebbutt	4	4	5
(Argentina) H Gumy	6	6	6
(Bulgaria) O Stanoytchev	4	4	4
(Australia) S Stolle	6	5	5	7^{7}	1
(Slovakia) D Hrbatý	1	7	7	6^{4}	6
(Sweden) N Kulti	6	6	6
(Morocco) K Alami	4	2	4
(Spain) T Carbonell	6	7^{7}	7
(Czech Republic) D Vacek	2	6^{5}	5
WC	(Australia) T Larkham	1	2	4
16	(Spain) A Berasategui	6	6	6

Second round
1	(United States) P Sampras	3	6	6	6
(Romania) A Voinea	6	2	3	2
(Australia) M Woodforde	6	6	7
(Argentina) H Gumy	0	1	5
(Slovakia) D Hrbatý	6	6	6
(Sweden) N Kulti	2	1	2
(Spain) T Carbonell	3	5	4
16	(Spain) A Berasategui	6	7	6

Third round
1	(United States) P Sampras	6	6	6
(Australia) M Woodforde	1	0	1
(Slovakia) D Hrbatý	6	7^{7}	6^{4}	2
16	(Spain) A Berasategui	3	6^{3}	7^{7}	0	r

Fourth round
1	(United States) P Sampras	6^{4}	6	6	3	6
(Slovakia) D Hrbatý	7^{7}	3	4	6	4

==== Section 2 ====
First round
10	(Spain) A Costa	7	6	7
(Australia) P Rafter	5	2	5
(Slovakia) J Krošlák	4	6	6	6
(Italy) A Gaudenzi	6	4	2	2
(Germany) A Rădulescu	2	4	7^{7}	3
(Australia) S Draper	6	6	6^{4}	6
(Belgium) F Dewulf	6	6	7
Q	(Netherlands) F Wibier	4	2	5
WC	(Australia) P Tramacchi	6^{6}	6	6	3
(Belgium) J Van Herck	7^{8}	3	4	2	r
Q	(Russia) A Cherkasov	4	6	3	4
(Italy) R Furlan	6	4	6	6
WC	(Australia) P Cash	4	4	3
(Argentina) J Frana	6	6	6
(Spain) C Costa	3	2	2
8	(South Africa) W Ferreira	6	6	6

Second round
10	(Spain) A Costa	6	7^{7}	7^{7}
(Slovakia) J Krošlák	1	6^{2}	6^{0}
(Australia) S Draper	7^{7}	7	6
(Belgium) F Dewulf	6^{5}	5	0
WC	(Australia) P Tramacchi	6^{1}	7^{7}	2	6^{4}
(Italy) R Furlan	7^{7}	6^{3}	6	7^{7}
(Argentina) J Frana	3	6	2	1
8	(South Africa) W Ferreira	6	3	6	6

Third round
10	(Spain) A Costa	6	6	7
(Australia) S Draper	4	2	5
(Italy) R Furlan	4	4	7^{7}	1
8	(South Africa) W Ferreira	6	6	6^{3}	6

Fourth round
10	(Spain) A Costa	6	6	3
8	(South Africa) W Ferreira	3	2	2	r

==== Section 3 ====
First round
3	(Croatia) G Ivanišević	6	7	6
WC	(Australia) B Ellwood	2	5	3
(Netherlands) P Haarhuis	1	6	3	6	4
(Slovakia) K Kučera	6	2	6	4	6
Q	(Sweden) L Jönsson	3	3	2
(Czech Republic) J Novák	6	6	6
(United States) C Woodruff	6	6	6
(Sweden) M Norman	4	1	1
(Sweden) M Tillström	5	6^{9}	6	4
(Brazil) G Kuerten	7	7^{11}	3	6
(Russia) A Chesnokov	1	3	6	1
(South Africa) N Godwin	6	6	3	6
WC	(India) L Paes	6	6	6
WC	(Australia) J Crabb	4	3	4
(Norway) C Ruud	3	4	7	6	10
13	(Netherlands) J Siemerink	6	6	5	2	8

Second round
3	(Croatia) G Ivanišević	6	6	6
(Slovakia) K Kučera	4	2	2
(Czech Republic) J Novák	2	6^{6}	2
(United States) C Woodruff	6	7^{8}	6
(Brazil) G Kuerten	7^{7}	3	1	0
(South Africa) N Godwin	6^{5}	6	6	6
WC	(India) L Paes	2	2	2
(Norway) C Ruud	6	6	6

Third round
3	(Croatia) G Ivanišević	6	6^{5}	6	6
(United States) C Woodruff	3	7^{7}	3	1
(South Africa) N Godwin	6^{6}	7^{7}	2	6^{5}
(Norway) C Ruud	7^{8}	6^{3}	6	7^{7}

Fourth round
3	(Croatia) G Ivanišević	4	6	6^{7}	6	6
(Norway) C Ruud	6	2	7^{9}	3	3

==== Section 4 ====
First round
11	(United States) J Courier	6^{4}	6	4	6	8
(Netherlands) S Schalken	7^{7}	3	6	1	6
(France) G Forget	2	6	3	4
(Czech Republic) S Doseděl	6	3	6	6
(Switzerland) M Rosset	6	7^{9}	6
(Spain) J Sánchez	4	6^{7}	1
(United States) J Tarango	2	7^{7}	7^{7}	6
Q	(United States) B Shelton	6	6^{1}	6^{2}	2
(France) JP Fleurian	7	6	6
(Morocco) H Arazi	5	0	3
Q	(Germany) J Knippschild	6	6^{2}	7^{7}	6
(Canada) S Lareau	2	7^{7}	6^{5}	3
(Spain) J Burillo	0	1	0	r
(South Africa) G Stafford	6	6	3
Q	(United States) G Grant	3	4	2
5	(Austria) T Muster	6	6	6

Second round
11	(United States) J Courier	4	6	3	6	6
(Czech Republic) S Doseděl	6	2	6	4	4
(Switzerland) M Rosset	4	1	1
(United States) J Tarango	6	6	6
(France) JP Fleurian	2	6^{5}	5
Q	(Germany) J Knippschild	6	7^{7}	7
(South Africa) G Stafford	3	2	2
5	(Austria) T Muster	6	6	6

Third round
11	(United States) J Courier	6	7^{7}	6
(United States) J Tarango	1	6^{3}	3
Q	(Germany) J Knippschild	4	6^{2}	3
5	(Austria) T Muster	6	7^{7}	6

Fourth round
11	(United States) J Courier	2	6	6^{4}	3
5	(Austria) T Muster	6	3	7^{7}	6

=== Bottom half ===
==== Section 5 ====
First round
6	(Germany) B Becker	7	6^{4}	6	1	4
(Spain) C Moyà	5	7^{7}	2	6	6
(United States) P McEnroe	7^{7}	6	6
(Russia) A Olhovskiy	6^{4}	2	4
(Sweden) T Johansson	6	6	1	6^{2}	6
(Czech Republic) M Damm	4	2	6	7^{7}	2
(Germany) B Karbacher	6	7^{7}	1	6
(Spain) M A Gorriz	4	6^{4}	6	3
(Germany) M-K Goellner	6	6	6^{2}	6
(Denmark) K Carlsen	4	1	7^{7}	4
(Czech Republic) B Ulihrach	6	1	4	2
(Sweden) J Björkman	1	6	6	6
Q	(Germany) K Braasch	3	6	6	7
(United States) A O'Brien	6	3	4	5
WC	(Australia) G Doyle	7^{7}	3	5	1
12	(Sweden) M Gustafsson	6^{2}	6	7	6

Second round
(Spain) C Moyà	3	6	6	6
(United States) P McEnroe	6	0	3	1
(Sweden) T Johansson	3	2	6^{5}
(Germany) B Karbacher	6	6	7^{7}
(Germany) M-K Goellner	4	6	4	1
(Sweden) J Björkman	6	3	6	6
Q	(Germany) K Braasch	3	7^{8}	6	6
12	(Sweden) M Gustafsson	6	6^{6}	4	4

Third round
(Spain) C Moyà	6	6	6
(Germany) B Karbacher	2	2	2
(Sweden) J Björkman	6	7^{7}	6
Q	(Germany) K Braasch	4	6^{5}	3

Fourth round
(Spain) C Moyà	6	1	3	6	6
(Sweden) J Björkman	3	6	6	2	4

==== Section 6 ====
First round
14	(Spain) F Mantilla	6	5	7	6
(United Kingdom) G Rusedski	4	7	5	2
(Germany) D Prinosil	7	6	1	5	7
(Brazil) F Meligeni	5	1	6	7	9
(France) A Boetsch	6	6	6
Q	(United States) D Caldwell	0	0	2
(France) L Roux	1	4	7^{7}	6	13
(United States) J Stark	6	6	6^{4}	2	11
(United States) M Washington	6	6^{6}	6	6
Q	(Netherlands) J Eltingh	3	7^{8}	3	2
(South Africa) M Ondruska	6^{6}	5	6	2
(Armenia) S Sargsian	7^{8}	7	4	6
(Spain) G Blanco	4	2	4
(France) S Simian	6	6	6
(Australia) T Woodbridge	6	6	6
LL	(The Bahamas) M Knowles	4	2	1

Second round
14	(Spain) F Mantilla	6	6	6
(Brazil) F Meligeni	2	4	0
(France) A Boetsch	6	6	6
(France) L Roux	4	4	1
(United States) M Washington	6	6	6
(Armenia) S Sargsian	1	0	2
(France) S Simian	3	3	6^{5}
(Australia) T Woodbridge	6	6	7^{7}

Third round
14	(Spain) F Mantilla	6	1	7^{7}	6
(France) A Boetsch	3	6	6^{4}	4
(United States) M Washington	4	6	6	6
(Australia) T Woodbridge	6	2	3	1

Fourth round
14	(Spain) F Mantilla	7	6	6
(United States) M Washington	5	2	1

==== Section 7 ====
First round
7	(Sweden) T Enqvist	6	6	6
(Venezuela) N Pereira	1	2	4
(New Zealand) B Steven	6	6	5	3	1
(Australia) R Fromberg	4	2	7	6	6
Q	(Australia) L Hewitt	3	4	3
(Spain) S Bruguera	6	6	6
(Sweden) M Larsson	6	6	7^{7}
(Spain) J A Viloca	3	3	6^{3}
Q	(United States) A Reichel	4	3	2
(Austria) G Schaller	6	6	6
Q	(Australia) T Mitchell	6^{2}	0	2
(Spain) À Corretja	7^{7}	6	6
(United States) M Joyce	6	7^{7}	6
(Spain) R Carretero	1	6^{4}	1
(Czech Republic) P Korda	6^{4}	3	3
9	(Chile) M Ríos	7^{7}	6	6

Second round
7	(Sweden) T Enqvist	6	6	7
(Australia) R Fromberg	4	4	5
(Spain) S Bruguera	4	6	6	7^{7}
(Sweden) M Larsson	6	3	4	6^{0}
(Austria) G Schaller	4	6	6	4	6
(Spain) À Corretja	6	3	3	6	3
(United States) M Joyce	0	4	2
9	(Chile) M Ríos	6	6	6

Third round
7	(Sweden) T Enqvist	7^{10}	7	6
(Spain) S Bruguera	6^{8}	5	2
(Austria) G Schaller	6	6^{2}	1	1
9	(Chile) M Ríos	4	7^{7}	6	6

Fourth round
7	(Sweden) T Enqvist	6	4	6^{4}	7^{7}	3
9	(Chile) M Ríos	4	6	7^{7}	6^{5}	6

==== Section 8 ====
First round
15	(Germany) M Stich	6	6	6
(Sweden) P Fredriksson	3	2	2
(France) T Champion	5	2	2
(Ukraine) A Medvedev	7	6	6
Q	(United States) J Gimelstob	3	6^{4}	6	4
Q	(Israel) E Ran	6	7^{7}	3	6
(Netherlands) D van Scheppingen	7^{7}	7^{7}	6
(Zimbabwe) B Black	6^{5}	6^{3}	4
(France) G Raoux	7^{7}	6	6
(Canada) D Nestor	6^{3}	2	2
LL	(Romania) A Pavel	5	4	2
(United Kingdom) T Henman	7	6	6
(United States) R Reneberg	2
Q	(Spain) O Burrieza	2	r
LL	(Belgium) K Goossens	0	3	1
2	(United States) M Chang	6	6	6

Second round
15	(Germany) M Stich	6	1	2	6	7
(Ukraine) A Medvedev	4	6	6	4	9
Q	(Israel) E Ran	2	2	2
(Netherlands) D van Scheppingen	6	6	6
(France) G Raoux	3	3	4
(United Kingdom) T Henman	6	6	6
(United States) R Reneberg	2	5	1
2	(United States) M Chang	6	7	6

Third round
(Ukraine) A Medvedev	6	6	6
(Netherlands) D van Scheppingen	1	4	1
(United Kingdom) T Henman	1	6^{3}	3
2	(United States) M Chang	6	7^{7}	6

Fourth round
(Ukraine) A Medvedev	6	2	2	1
2	(United States) M Chang	4	6	6	6

Preceded by 1996 US Open – Men's singles	Grand Slam men's singles	Succeeded by 1997 French Open – Men's singles
