= Filippo Veglio =

Swiss tennis player

- Country (sports): Switzerland
- Born: 21 March 1974 (age 51)
- Plays: Right-handed
- Prize money: $68,926

Singles
- Career record: 1-2
- Career titles: 0
- Highest ranking: No. 273 (4 Nov 1996)

Grand Slam singles results
- US Open: 2R (1996)

Doubles
- Career record: 5-6
- Career titles: 0
- Highest ranking: No. 105 (8 Mar 1999)

Filippo Veglio (born 21 March 1974) is a former professional tennis player from Switzerland.

== Career ==
Veglio played his first and only Grand Slam in 1996, at the US Open, as a qualifier in the Men's Singles. He upset world number 57 Christian Ruud in the opening round and took the first set off Àlex Corretja, but lost in four.

He was however most successful as a doubles player. In 1998 he teamed up with Barry Cowan at Chennai and the pair reached the semi-finals, where they were defeated by Mahesh Bhupathi and Leander Paes. His only other semi-final appearance on tour came at the 1999 Copenhagen Open, with Michael Kohlmann as his partner.

== Challenger titles ==
=== Doubles: (3) ===
No.	Year	Tournament	Surface	Partner	Opponents	Score
1.	1997	Newcastle, UK	Clay	(Spain) Óscar Burrieza-Lopez	(France) Arnaud Clément (France) Rodolphe Gilbert	7–5, 4–0 ret.
2.	1999	Heilbronn, Germany	Carpet	(Germany) Michael Kohlmann	(United States) Justin Gimelstob (United States) Chris Woodruff	6–4, 6–7^{(3–7)}, 7–5
3.	1999	Hamburg, Germany	Carpet	(Germany) Michael Kohlmann	(Argentina) Martín García (Brazil) Cristiano Testa	6–4, 7–6^{(7–3)}
