= David Caldwell (tennis) =

American tennis player

- Country (sports): United States
- Residence: Richmond, Virginia. United States
- Born: June 13, 1974 (age 52) Danville, Virginia, United States
- Height: 1.80 m (5 ft 11 in)
- Turned pro: 1996
- Plays: Right-handed (two-handed backhand)
- Prize money: $114,102

Singles
- Career record: 2-9
- Career titles: 0; 0 Challenger, 0 Futures
- Highest ranking: No. 170 (16 November 1998)

Grand Slam singles results
- Australian Open: 1R (1997, 1999)
- French Open: Q1 (1998)
- US Open: 1R (1996)

Doubles
- Career record: 0-2
- Career titles: 0; 0 Challenger, 0 Futures
- Highest ranking: No. 346 (5 August 1996)

Grand Slam doubles results
- US Open: 1R (1996)
Medal record
Representing United States
Summer Universiade
Gold medal – first place	1995 Fukuoka	Doubles
- Last updated on: 21 April 2023.

David Caldwell (born June 13, 1974) is a former professional tennis player from the United States.

== Career ==
Caldwell was a three time All-American while at the University of North Carolina. He and Paul Goldstein were doubles gold medalists at the 1995 Summer Universiade, held in Fukuoka.

He lost to Petr Korda in the opening round of the 1996 US Open and also exited in the first round of men's doubles, partnering Cecil Mamiit.

His next Grand Slam appearance was in the 1997 Australian Open, where he again failed to make the second round, losing to Arnaud Boetsch.

Caldwell had wins over Kenneth Carlsen and Ramón Delgado to reach the round of 16 at Washington in 1998.

He was beaten by Fabrice Santoro in first round of the 1999 Australian Open.

== ATP Challenger and ITF Futures finals ==
=== Singles: 1 (0–1) ===
Legend ATP Challenger (0–1) ITF Futures (0–0)	Finals by surface Hard (0–1) Clay (0–0) Grass (0–0) Carpet (0–0)

Result	W–L	Date	Tournament	Tier	Surface	Opponent	Score
Loss	0–1	Jul 1998	Granby, Canada	Challenger	Hard	(Japan) Takao Suzuki	6–7, 3–6

=== Doubles: 2 (0–2) ===
Legend ATP Challenger (0–1) ITF Futures (0–1)	Finals by surface Hard (0–2) Clay (0–0) Grass (0–0) Carpet (0–0)

Result	W–L	Date	Tournament	Tier	Surface	Partner	Opponents	Score
Loss	0–1	Jul 1997	Aptos, United States	Challenger	Hard	(United States) Adam Peterson	(Canada) Sébastien Leblanc (Canada) Jocelyn Robichaud	6–7, 4–6
Loss	0–2	Mar 1998	Philippines F2, Manila	Futures	Hard	(United States) Chris Tontz	(Chinese Taipei) Chih-Jung Chen (South Korea) Lee Hyung-taik	1–6, 4–6

== Performance Timeline ==
Key
W	F	SF	QF	#R	RR	Q#	DNQ	A	NH

(W) winner; (F) finalist; (SF) semifinalist; (QF) quarterfinalist; (#R) rounds 4, 3, 2, 1; (RR) round-robin stage; (Q#) qualification round; (DNQ) did not qualify; (A) absent; (NH) not held; (SR) strike rate (events won / competed); (W–L) win–loss record.

=== Singles ===
Tournament	1996	1997	1998	1999	SR	W–L	Win %
Grand Slam tournaments
Australian Open	A	1R	Q3	1R	0 / 2	0–2	0%
French Open	A	A	A	Q1	0 / 0	0–0	–
Wimbledon	A	A	A	A	0 / 0	0–0	–
US Open	1R	Q1	Q1	Q1	0 / 1	0–1	0%
Win–loss	0–1	0–1	0–0	0–1	0 / 3	0–3	0%
ATP Masters Series
Miami	A	A	A	1R	0 / 1	0–1	0%
Canada	Q2	A	A	Q2	0 / 0	0–0	–
Cincinnati	A	Q2	A	A	0 / 0	0–0	–
Win–loss	0–0	0–0	0–0	0–1	0 / 1	0–1	0%
