= Aleksandra Olsza =

Polish tennis player

- Country (sports): Poland
- Born: 8 December 1977 (age 48) Katowice
- Height: 1.65 m (5 ft 5 in)
- Turned pro: 1996
- Retired: 1999
- Plays: Right-handed
- Prize money: US$ 278,504

Singles
- Career record: 130–133
- Career titles: 1 ITF
- Highest ranking: No. 72 (30 Sep 1996)

Grand Slam singles results
- Australian Open: 1R (1997)
- French Open: 1R (1997)
- Wimbledon: 2R (1996, 1997)
- US Open: 2R (1996)

Other tournaments
- Olympic Games: 1R (1996)

Doubles
- Career record: 118–112
- Career titles: 5 ITF
- Highest ranking: No. 69 (13 Sep 1999)

Grand Slam doubles results
- Australian Open: 2R (1999)
- French Open: 2R (1999)
- Wimbledon: 2R (1999)
- US Open: 2R (1996, 1999)
- Last updated on: 3 Jun 2026.

Aleksandra Olsza (Polish pronunciation: [alɛˈksandra ˈɔlʂa]; 8 December 1977) is a Polish former tennis player. Her career highlights include winning of the 1995 Wimbledon Championships in both girls' singles and doubles. At the 1996 US Open, Olsza defeated world No. 12, Magdalena Maleeva.

== Achievements ==
- At the 1995 Wimbledon Championships, Olsza won titles in both girls' singles and girls' doubles (with Cara Black).
- At the 1996 US Open, Olsza defeated world No. 12 player Magdalena Maleeva in the first round.
- Olsza represented Poland at the 1996 Summer Olympics, but lost in the first round.

== Equipment ==
Olsza used the Prince racquet model Precision 720.

== WTA Tour finals ==
=== Doybles: 3 (3 titles, 3 runner-ups) ===
Legend Tier I/Grand Slam tournaments (0–0) Tier II/ WTA 1000 (0–0) Tier III/ WTA 500 (0–1) Tier IV / WTA 250 (0–2)	Finals by surface Hard (0–2) Grass (0–0) Clay (0–0) Carpet (0–1)

Result	W–L	Date	Tournament	Tier	Surface	Partner	Opponents	Score
Loss	0–1	Sep 1995	Moscow Open, Russia	Tier III	Carpet	(Russia) Anna Kournikova	(United States) Meredith McGrath (Latvia) Larisa Savchenko-Neiland	0–6 1–6
Loss	0–2	Jan 1997	Auckland Open, New Zealand	Tier IV	Hard	(Germany) Elena Wagner	(Slovakia) Janette Husárová (Belgium) Dominique Monami	2–6, 7–6^{(7–5)}, 3–6
Loss	0–3	Nov 1998	Pattaya Open, Thailand	Tier IV	Hard	(Japan) Rika Hiraki	(France) Julie Halard (Belgium) Els Callens	6–3, 2–6, 2–6

== ITF Circuit finals ==
=== Singles: 4 (1 title, 3 runner-ups) ===
Legend
$50,000 tournaments (0–0)
$25,000 tournaments (1–2)
$10,000 tournaments (0–1)

Result	W–L	Date	Tournament	Tier	Surface	Opponent	Score
Loss	0–1	Apr 1994	Supetar, Croatia	10,000	Clay	(Argentina) Maria Fernanda Landa	5–7, 6–4, 4–6
Loss	0–2	Jun 1997	Surbiton Trophy, United Kingdom	25,000	Grass	(Thailand) Tamarine Tanasugarn	7–5, 6–7, 0–5 ret.
Loss	0–3	Nov 1997	Mount Gambier, Australia	25,000	Hard	(Israel) Hila Rosen	1–6, 3–6
Win	1–3	Nov 1997	Nuriootpa, Australia	25,000	Hard	(Italy) Adriana Serra Zanetti	6–1, 6–1

=== Doubles (5–5) ===
Result	No.	Date	Tournament	Surface	Partner	Opponents	Score
Win	1.	17 May 1993	ITF Katowice, Poland	Clay	(Poland) Patrycja Gajdzik	(South Africa) Michelle Anderson (Czech Republic) Katerina Zajacová	6–4, 4–6, 7–6^{(1)}
Win	2.	28 June 1993	Supetar, Croatia	Clay	(Poland) Katarzyna Malec	(Croatia) Ivona Horvat (Slovenia) Tina Vukasovič	7–5, 7–6^{(5)}
Win	3.	29 August 1993	Gryfino, Poland	Clay	(Ukraine) Elena Tatarkova	(Poland) Monika Starosta (Czech Republic) Alena Vašková	7–6^{(4)}, 4–6, 7–5
Loss	4.	13 September 1993	Zadar, Croatia	Clay	(Czech Republic) Alena Vašková	(Slovakia) Simona Nedorostová (Slovenia) Tjaša Jezernik	6–3, 5–7, 4–6
Win	5.	27 September 1993	Mali Lošinj, Croatia	Clay	(Czech Republic) Helena Vildová	(Croatia) Ivona Horvat (Slovenia) Tina Vukasovič	6–0, 6–7^{(5)}, 6–3
Loss	6.	25 October 1993	Jurmala, Latvia	Hard	(Switzerland) Miroslava Vavrinec	(Ukraine) Natalia Bondarenko (Ukraine) Elena Tatarkova	6–7, 2–6
Loss	7.	26 September 1994	Mali Lošinj, Croatia	Clay	(Czech Republic) Blanka Kumbárová	(Russia) Olga Ivanova (Ukraine) Natalia Nemchinova	3–6, 7–6^{(5)}, 6–7^{(5)}
Loss	8.	2 February 1997	Prostějov, Czech Republic	Carpet (i)	(Ukraine) Elena Tatarkova	(Slovakia) Denisa Krajčovičová (Hungary) Andrea Temesvári	2–6, 3–6
Loss	9.	23 November 1997	Port Pirie, Australia	Hard	(South Africa) Jessica Steck	(South Africa) Nannie de Villiers (Australia) Lisa McShea	4–6, 3–6
Win	10.	30 March 1998	ITF Phoenix, United States	Hard	(Sweden) Kristina Triska	(United States) Amy Frazier (Japan) Rika Hiraki	6–4, 7–6^{(5)}

== Junior Grand Slam tournament finals ==
=== Singles: 1 (1 title) ===
Result	Year	Tournament	Surface	Opponent	Score
Win	1995	Wimbledon	Grass	(Thailand) Tamarine Tanasugarn	7–5, 7–6^{(8–6)}

=== Doubles: 2 (1 title, 1 runner-up) ===
Result	Year	Tournament	Surface	Partner	Opponents	Score
Win	1995	Wimbledon	Grass	(Zimbabwe) Cara Black	(Australia) Trudi Musgrave (Australia) Jodi Richardson	6–0, 7–6^{(7–5)}
Loss	1995	US Open	Hard	(Russia) Anna Kournikova	(United States) Corina Morariu (San Marino) Ludmilla Varmuza	3–6, 3–6
