= Nino Louarsabishvili =

Georgian tennis player

- Country (sports): Georgia
- Born: 3 February 1977 (age 48)
- Turned pro: 1992
- Retired: 2000
- Prize money: $122,602

Singles
- Career record: 145–123
- Career titles: 6 ITF
- Highest ranking: No. 135 (24 April 1995)

Grand Slam singles results
- Australian Open: Q2 (1996, 1997)
- French Open: Q1 (1995)
- Wimbledon: Q1 (1995)
- US Open: Q3 (1996)

Doubles
- Career record: 79 – 76
- Career titles: 7 ITF
- Highest ranking: No. 111 (21 July 1997)

Grand Slam doubles results
- Australian Open: 1R (1998)
- Wimbledon: Q1 (1995)
- US Open: Q2 (1996, 1997)

Nino Louarsabishvili (born 3 February 1977) is a retired Georgian female tennis player.

She won six singles and seven doubles titles on the ITF circuit in her career. On 24 April 1995, she reached her best singles ranking of world number 135. On 21 July 1997, she peaked at number 111 in the doubles rankings.

Playing for Georgia at the Fed Cup, Louarsabishvili has a win–loss record of 17–23. Louarsabishvili retired from professional tennis 2000.

== ITF finals ==
$50,000 tournaments
$25,000 tournaments
$10,000 tournaments

=== Singles (6–3) ===
Result	No.	Date	Tournament	Surface	Opponent	Score
Win	1.	15 March 1993	Jaffa, Israel	Hard	(Israel) Shiri Burstein	6–1, 6–2
Win	2.	22 March 1993	Ramat HaSharon, Israel	Hard	(Germany) Anja Franken	6–2, 6–1
Loss	1.	16 June 1997	McAllen, United States	Hard	(United States) Melissa Gurney	0–6, 4–6
Win	3.	13 June 1994	Prostějov, Czech Republic	Clay	(Czech Republic) Lenka Cenková	6–2, 6–0
Win	4.	24 June 1996	Madison, United States	Hard	(Canada) Vanessa Webb	1–6, 6–1, 6–2
Win	5.	19 May 1997	Sochi, Russia	Hard	(South Africa) Jessica Steck	7–5, 6–0
Loss	2.	30 November 1998	Cairo, Egypt	Clay	(Morocco) Bahia Mouhtassine	6–3, 3–6, 2–6
Win	6.	7 December 1998	Ismaïlia, Egypt	Clay	(Slovakia) Gabriela Voleková	1–6, 6–2, 7–5
Loss	3.	22 February 1999	Faro, Portugal	Hard	(France) Carine Bornu	3–6, 3–6

=== Doubles (7–6) ===
Result	No.	Date	Tournament	Surface	Partner	Opponents	Score
Win	1.	23 June 1996	Peachtree, United States	Hard	(United States) Erica Adams	(Australia) Joanne Limmer (Australia) Lisa McShea	6–3, 7–6^{(7–4)}
Win	2.	29 July 1996	Roanoke, United States	Hard	(South Africa) Liezel Horn	(United States) Rebecca Jensen (United States) Shannan McCarthy	6–4, 6–4
Win	3.	31 March 1997	Phoenix, United States	Hard	(France) Lea Ghirardi	(Argentina) María José Gaidano (Venezuela) María Vento-Kabchi	6–0, 6–2
Loss	1.	19 May 1997	Sochi, Russia	Hard	(Japan) Kaoru Shibata	(Russia) Evgenia Kulikovskaya (Russia) Ekaterina Sysoeva	6–3, 3–6, 0–6
Loss	2.	19 June 1997	Marseille, France	Clay	(France) Caroline Dhenin	(Hungary) Katalin Marosi (Argentina) Veronica Stele	2–6, 6–4, 1–6
Win	4.	23 June 1997	Bordeaux, France	Clay	(France) Caroline Dhenin	(Argentina) María Fernanda Landa (Germany) Marlene Weingärtner	6–7^{(6–8)}, 6–4, 7–5
Loss	3.	2 March 1998	Rockford, United States	Hard (i)	(Netherlands) Seda Noorlander	(South Africa) Surina De Beer (United States) Lindsay Lee-Waters	2–6, 4–6
Loss	4.	8 June 1998	Sochi, Russia	Hard	(Ukraine) Elena Tatarkova	(Japan) Saori Obata (Japan) Kaoru Shibata	6–3, 4–6, 2–6
Loss	5.	14 September 1998	Constanța, Romania	Hard	(Romania) Alice Pirsu	(Netherlands) Debby Haak (Netherlands) Jolanda Mens	3–6, 6–7^{(5–7)}
Win	5.	30 November 1998	Cairo, Egypt	Clay	(Morocco) Bahia Mouhtassine	(Italy) Sabina Da Ponte (Italy) Nathalie Viérin	7–5, 6–3
Win	6.	7 December 1998	Ismailia, Egypt	Clay	(Morocco) Bahia Mouhtassine	(Federal Republic of Yugoslavia) Ljiljana Nanušević (Slovakia) Gabriela Voleková	6–3, 6–3
Loss	6.	1 March 1999	Albufeira, Portugal	Hard	(Sweden) Kristina Triska	(Czech Republic) Olga Vymetálková (Czech Republic) Gabriela Chmelinová	3–6, 2–6
Win	7.	12 July 1999	Sezze, Italy	Clay	(Denmark) Charlotte Aagaard	(Germany) Eva Belbl (New Zealand) Shelley Stephens	6–2, 6–2
