= Kelly Pace-Wilson =

American tennis player

- Country (sports): United States
- Born: September 5, 1973 (age 53) Huntsville, Alabama, U.S.
- Plays: Right-handed
- Prize money: $37,110

Singles
- Highest ranking: No. 196 (October 14, 1996)

Doubles
- Career titles: 0 WTA / 3 ITF
- Highest ranking: No. 134 (January 26, 1998)

Grand Slam doubles results
- US Open: 1R (1996)
Medal record
Representing United States
Summer Universiade
Bronze medal – third place	1995 Fukuoka	Singles

Kelly Pace-Wilson (born September 5, 1973) is an American former professional tennis player. She competed in the 1990s under her maiden name Kelly Pace.

== Biography ==
Born in Huntsville, Alabama, Pace-Wilson played college tennis at the University of Texas at Austin (Longhorns) from 1992 to 1995. She was a five-time All-American and was a member of two NCAA championship winning teams. The second of those championships came in her senior year in 1995, when she reached the top of the ITA rankings and was runner-up in both singles and doubles at the NCAA championships. She won a bronze medal for the United States at the 1995 Summer Universiade in Fukuoka, graduating that year with the Longhorns record for most career wins in singles.

Pace, a right-handed player, reached a best singles ranking on the professional tour of 196 in the world. In doubles she was ranked as high as 134 and featured as a qualifier in the main draw of the 1996 US Open, with Jane Chi. She won three ITF doubles titles, which included a $75,000 tournament in Wichita in 1997.

Upon getting married, Kelly Wilson began playing competitive golf. Her achievements include qualifying for 12 USGA National Championships, a runner-up finish in the 2009 California Women's Amateur Championships, winning the 2020 Sacramento City Championship, and winning the inaugural NCGA Women's Mid Amateur Championship in 2021. Wilson nearly qualified for the 2014 US Open Championship in golf, which would have made her only the 3rd women to participate in both the tennis and golf version of this Championship.
