= 1996 US Open – Men's doubles =

Men's doubles
- 1996 US Open

Final
- Champions: (Australia) Todd Woodbridge (Australia) Mark Woodforde
- Runners-up: (Netherlands) Jacco Eltingh (Netherlands) Paul Haarhuis
- Score: 4–6, 7–6^{(7–5)}, 7–6^{(7–2)}

Details
- Draw: 64 (7WC / 4Q / 1LL)
- Seeds: 16

Events
Singles	men	women		boys	girls
Doubles	men	women	mixed	boys	girls
WC Singles	men	women	quad
WC Doubles	men	women	quad
Legends	men	women	mixed
← 1995 ·	US Open	· 1997 →

The 1996 US Open was a tennis tournament played on outdoor hard courts at the USTA National Tennis Center in New York City in New York in the United States. It was the 116th edition of the US Open and was held from August 26 through September 8, 1996.

== Seeds ==
Champion seeds are indicated in bold text while text in italics indicates the round in which those seeds were eliminated.

1. (Australia) **Todd Woodbridge** / (Australia) **Mark Woodforde (champions)**
2. (Zimbabwe) Byron Black / (Canada) Grant Connell (first round)
3. (The Bahamas) Mark Knowles / (Canada) Daniel Nestor (first round)
4. (France) Guy Forget / (Switzerland) Jakob Hlasek (semifinals)
5. (Sweden) Jonas Björkman / (Sweden) Nicklas Kulti (first round)
6. (South Africa) Ellis Ferreira / (Netherlands) Jan Siemerink (second round)
7. (Canada) Sébastien Lareau / (United States) Alex O'Brien (quarterfinals)
8. (Netherlands) Jacco Eltingh / (Netherlands) Paul Haarhuis (final)
9. (Belgium) Libor Pimek / (South Africa) Byron Talbot (second round)
10. (Czech Republic) Petr Korda / (Czech Republic) Cyril Suk (first round)
11. Unknown (withdrew)
12. (Argentina) Luis Lobo / (Spain) Javier Sánchez (quarterfinals)
13. (Australia) Mark Philippoussis / (Australia) Patrick Rafter (semifinals)
14. (Germany) David Prinosil / (Czech Republic) Daniel Vacek (first round)
15. (United States) Trevor Kronemann / (Australia) David Macpherson (quarterfinals)
16. (Czech Republic) Jiří Novák / (Czech Republic) David Rikl (first round)

== Draw ==
=== Key ===
- Q = Qualifier
- WC = Wild card
- LL = Lucky loser
- Alt = Alternate
- ITF = ITF entry
- PR = Protected ranking
- SR = Special ranking
- SE = Special exempt
- JE = Junior exempt
- JR = Junior Accelerator Programme entrant
- CO = College Accelerator Programme entrant
- NG = Next Gen Accelerator Program entrant
- w/o = Walkover
- r = Retired
- d = Defaulted

=== Finals ===
Quarterfinals
1	(Australia) **Todd Woodbridge** **(Australia) Mark Woodforde**	**6**	**7**
7	(Canada) Sébastien Lareau (United States) Alex O'Brien	3	5
13	(Australia) **Mark Philippoussis** **(Australia) Patrick Rafter**	**6**	**6**
(Netherlands) Hendrik Jan Davids (Netherlands) Sjeng Schalken	3	4
12	(Argentina) Luis Lobo (Spain) Javier Sánchez	**7**	6	6
4	(France) **Guy Forget** **(Switzerland) Jakob Hlasek**	6	**7**	**7**
8	(Netherlands) **Jacco Eltingh** **(Netherlands) Paul Haarhuis**	**7**	6	**6**
15	(United States) Trevor Kronemann (Australia) David Macpherson	5	**7**	2

Semifinals
1	(Australia) **Todd Woodbridge** **(Australia) Mark Woodforde**	6	**6**	**6**
13	(Australia) Mark Philippoussis (Australia) Patrick Rafter	**7**	3	4
4	(France) Guy Forget (Switzerland) Jakob Hlasek	6	6
8	(Netherlands) **Jacco Eltingh** **(Netherlands) Paul Haarhuis**	**7**	**7**

Final
1	(Australia) **Todd Woodbridge** **(Australia) Mark Woodforde**	4	**7**	**7**
8	(Netherlands) Jacco Eltingh (Netherlands) Paul Haarhuis	**6**	6	6

=== Top half ===
==== Section 1 ====
First round
1	(Australia) **T Woodbridge** **(Australia) M Woodforde**	**6**	3	**7**
(United States) M Joyce (United States) V Spadea	4	**6**	5
(France) **J-P Fleurian** **(France) G Raoux**	**7**	**6**
(United States) D Johnson (United States) F Montana	6	3
(United States) **S Cannon** **(The Bahamas) R Smith**	**6**	3	**6**
(Italy) S Pescosolido (Italy) V Santopadre	4	**6**	4
(Netherlands) **T Kempers** **(Netherlands) T Nijssen**	**6**	2	**6**
16	(Czech Republic) J Novák (Czech Republic) D Rikl	3	**6**	4
(United States) **B MacPhie** **(Australia) M Tebbutt**	**6**	3	**6**
10	(Czech Republic) P Korda (Czech Republic) C Suk	3	**6**	3
(United States) **M Keil** **(United States) M Lucena**	**6**	**6**
(United States) B Hansen-Dent (United States) TJ Middleton	4	4
(Australia) **P Cash** **(Australia) S Stolle**	**7**	2	**6**
(Sweden) R Bergh (United States) J Waite	6	**6**	4
7	(Canada) **S Lareau** **(United States) A O'Brien**	**6**	**6**
(South Africa) C Ferreira (Romania) A Pavel	4	3

Second round
1	(Australia) **T Woodbridge** **(Australia) M Woodforde**	**6**	**6**
(France) J-P Fleurian (France) G Raoux	4	3
(United States) **S Cannon** **(The Bahamas) R Smith**	**6**	**6**
(Netherlands) T Kempers (Netherlands) T Nijssen	4	1
(United States) B MacPhie (Australia) M Tebbutt	3	4
(United States) **M Keil** **(United States) M Lucena**	**6**	**6**
(Australia) P Cash (Australia) S Stolle	**6**	6	6
7	(Canada) **S Lareau** **(United States) A O'Brien**	4	**7**	**7**

Third round
1	(Australia) **T Woodbridge** **(Australia) M Woodforde**	**6**	**6**
(United States) S Cannon (The Bahamas) R Smith	2	3
(United States) M Keil (United States) M Lucena	1	**7**	3
7	(Canada) **S Lareau** **(United States) A O'Brien**	**6**	5	**6**

Quarterfinals
1	(Australia) **T Woodbridge** **(Australia) M Woodforde**	**6**	**7**
7	(Canada) S Lareau (United States) A O'Brien	3	5

==== Section 2 ====
First round
(South Africa) **J-L de Jager** **(South Africa) C van Rensburg**	**7**	**7**
3	(The Bahamas) M Knowles (Canada) D Nestor	5	6
(Spain) **JA Conde** **(Spain) À Corretja**	**6**	1	**7**
(South Africa) M Barnard (United States) G Van Emburgh	4	**6**	6
(Croatia) **S Hiršzon** **(Croatia) G Ivanišević**	**6**	3	**6**
(United States) S Davis (Sweden) D Ekerot	3	**6**	3
13	(Australia) **M Philippoussis** **(Australia) P Rafter**	**7**	**6**
(United States) K Kinnear (United States) D Randall	5	3
(Mexico) **L Lavalle** **(Venezuela) M Ruah**	**6**	**6**
(Germany) P Kühnen (South Africa) G Muller	4	4
(Netherlands) **HJ Davids** **(Netherlands) S Schalken**	3	**7**	**6**
(United States) J Leach (United States) R Leach	**6**	6	4
(France) **O Delaître** **(United States) J Tarango**	6	**7**	**6**
(The Bahamas) M Merklein (United States) B Shelton	**7**	6	3
6	(South Africa) **E Ferreira** **(Netherlands) J Siemerink**	**6**	**6**
(Czech Republic) M Damm (Sweden) P Nyborg	4	3

Second round
(South Africa) J-L de Jager (South Africa) C van Rensburg	6	**6**	2
(Spain) **JA Conde** **(Spain) À Corretja**	**7**	3	**6**
(Croatia) S Hiršzon (Croatia) G Ivanišević	3	**7**	6
13	(Australia) **M Philippoussis** **(Australia) P Rafter**	**6**	6	**7**
(Mexico) L Lavalle (Venezuela) M Ruah	4	**7**	4
(Netherlands) **HJ Davids** **(Netherlands) S Schalken**	**6**	6	**6**
(France) **O Delaître** **(United States) J Tarango**	**6**	**6**
6	(South Africa) E Ferreira (Netherlands) J Siemerink	1	4

Third round
(Spain) JA Conde (Spain) À Corretja	3	6
13	(Australia) **M Philippoussis** **(Australia) P Rafter**	**6**	**7**
(Netherlands) **HJ Davids** **(Netherlands) S Schalken**	**6**	**7**
(France) O Delaître (United States) J Tarango	2	6

Quarterfinals
13	(Australia) **M Philippoussis** **(Australia) P Rafter**	**6**	**6**
(Netherlands) HJ Davids (Netherlands) S Schalken	3	4

=== Bottom half ===
==== Section 3 ====
First round
(Italy) **A Gaudenzi** **(Italy) D Nargiso**	3	**6**	**6**
5	(Sweden) J Björkman (Sweden) N Kulti	**6**	3	4
(South Africa) **M Ondruska** **(United Kingdom) A Richardson**	**6**	4	**6**
(United Kingdom) N Broad (South Africa) P Norval	0	**6**	1
(Spain) **T Carbonell** **(Spain) F Roig**	**7**	**6**
(Ecuador) N Lapentti (Argentina) D Orsanic	6	2
12	(Argentina) **L Lobo** **(Spain) J Sánchez**	**6**	**6**
(Australia) J Eagle (Australia) A Florent	3	3
(South Africa) **L Bale** **(Hungary) G Köves**	**6**	**6**
14	(Germany) D Prinosil (Czech Republic) D Vacek	4	3
(Czech Republic) **K Nováček** **(Venezuela) N Pereira**	**6**	**6**
(Australia) S Draper (United States) K Thorne	2	4
(United States) **K Jones** **(United States) C Woodruff**	**7**	**6**
(United Kingdom) M Petchey (United Kingdom) D Sapsford	5	2
4	(France) **G Forget** **(Switzerland) J Hlasek**	**6**	2
(Czech Republic) P Pála (Czech Republic) P Vízner	3	0^{r}

Second round
(Italy) **A Gaudenzi** **(Italy) D Nargiso**	**6**	**7**
(South Africa) M Ondruska (United Kingdom) A Richardson	4	6
(Spain) T Carbonell (Spain) F Roig	6	1
12	(Argentina) **L Lobo** **(Spain) J Sánchez**	**7**	**6**
(South Africa) L Bale (Hungary) G Köves	5	4
(Czech Republic) **K Nováček** **(Venezuela) N Pereira**	**7**	**6**
(United States) K Jones (United States) C Woodruff	1	4
4	(France) **G Forget** **(Switzerland) J Hlasek**	**6**	**6**

Third round
(Italy) A Gaudenzi (Italy) D Nargiso	6	4
12	(Argentina) **L Lobo** **(Spain) J Sánchez**	**7**	**6**
(Czech Republic) K Nováček (Venezuela) N Pereira	**6**	6	4
4	(France) **G Forget** **(Switzerland) J Hlasek**	4	**7**	**6**

Quarterfinals
12	(Argentina) L Lobo (Spain) J Sánchez	**7**	6	6
4	(France) **G Forget** **(Switzerland) J Hlasek**	6	**7**	**7**

==== Section 4 ====
First round
8	(Netherlands) **J Eltingh** **(Netherlands) P Haarhuis**	**6**	**6**
(United States) L Jensen (United States) M Jensen	2	4
(United States) **P Galbraith** **(United Kingdom) T Henman**	**7**	**7**
(United States) J Gimelstob (Socialist Federal Republic of Yugoslavia) S Muskatirovic	6	5
(South Africa) **D Adams** **(Netherlands) M Oosting**	5	**6**	**6**
(United States) K Flach (Russia) A Olhovskiy	**7**	4	4
9	(Belgium) **L Pimek** **(South Africa) B Talbot**	**6**	**6**
(United States) B Bryan (United States) M Bryan	4	4
15	(United States) **T Kronemann** **(Australia) D Macpherson**	**6**	**6**
(United States) D Caldwell (Philippines) C Mamiit	3	2
(United States) **J Palmer** **(United States) J Stark**	**6**	**6**
(United States) C Clark (United States) J Salzenstein	3	4
(United States) **D Flach** **(United States) D Wheaton**	3	**6**	**6**
(South Africa) B Haygarth (Australia) P Kilderry	**6**	4	3
(Netherlands) **S Noteboom** **(Netherlands) F Wibier**	2	**6**	**6**
2	(Zimbabwe) B Black (Canada) G Connell	**6**	4	3

Second round
8	(Netherlands) **J Eltingh** **(Netherlands) P Haarhuis**	**6**	4	**7**
(United States) P Galbraith (United Kingdom) T Henman	1	**6**	6
(South Africa) **D Adams** **(Netherlands) M Oosting**	**6**	6	**6**
9	(Belgium) L Pimek (South Africa) B Talbot	3	**7**	3
15	(United States) **T Kronemann** **(Australia) D Macpherson**	**6**	**6**
(United States) J Palmer (United States) J Stark	3	4
(United States) **D Flach** **(United States) D Wheaton**	**6**	6	**6**
(Netherlands) S Noteboom (Netherlands) F Wibier	3	**7**	3

Third round
8	(Netherlands) **J Eltingh** **(Netherlands) P Haarhuis**	**7**	4	**6**
(South Africa) D Adams (Netherlands) M Oosting	5	**6**	2
15	(United States) **T Kronemann** **(Australia) D Macpherson**	**6**	**7**
(United States) D Flach (United States) D Wheaton	3	5

Quarterfinals
8	(Netherlands) **J Eltingh** **(Netherlands) P Haarhuis**	**7**	6	**6**
15	(United States) T Kronemann (Australia) D Macpherson	5	**7**	2
