= 1996 US Open – Mixed doubles =

Mixed doubles
- 1996 US Open
- 1995 Champions: (United States) Meredith McGrath (United States) Matt Lucena

Final
- Champions: (United States) Lisa Raymond (United States) Patrick Galbraith
- Runners-up: (Netherlands) Manon Bollegraf (United States) Rick Leach
- Score: 7–6^{(8–6)}, 7–6^{(7–4)}

Details
- Draw: 32
- Seeds: 8

Events
Singles	men	women		boys	girls
Doubles	men	women	mixed	boys	girls
WC Singles	men	women	quad
WC Doubles	men	women	quad
Legends	men	women	mixed
- US Open

Meredith McGrath and Matt Lucena were the defending champions but only Lucena competed that year with Kimberly Po.

Po and Lucena lost in the first round to Els Callens and Tom Kempers.

Lisa Raymond and Patrick Galbraith won in the final 7–6^{(8–6)}, 7–6^{(7–4)} against Manon Bollegraf and Rick Leach.

== Seeds ==
Champion seeds are indicated in bold text while text in italics indicates the round in which those seeds were eliminated.

1. (Latvia) Larisa Neiland / (Australia) Mark Woodforde (second round)
2. (Czech Republic) Helena Suková / (Czech Republic) Cyril Suk (quarterfinals)
3. (United States) **Lisa Raymond** / (United States) **Patrick Galbraith (champions)**
4. (Netherlands) Manon Bollegraf / (United States) Rick Leach (final)
5. (Romania) Irina Spîrlea / (Belgium) Libor Pimek (first round)
6. (Netherlands) Caroline Vis / (South Africa) Byron Talbot (quarterfinals)
7. (Australia) Rennae Stubbs / (Australia) Joshua Eagle (quarterfinals)
8. (United States) Lori McNeil / (United States) Mark Keil (first round)

== Draw ==
Key

- Q = Qualifier
- WC = Wild card
- LL = Lucky loser
- Alt = Alternate
- ITF = ITF entry
- PR = Protected ranking
- SR = Special ranking
- SE = Special exempt
- JE = Junior exempt
- JR = Junior Accelerator Programme entrant
- CO = College Accelerator Programme entrant
- NG = Next Gen Accelerator Program entrant
- w/o = Walkover
- r = Retired
- d = Defaulted

=== Final ===
Final
4	(Netherlands) Manon Bollegraf (United States) Rick Leach	6^{6}	6^{4}
3	(United States) **Lisa Raymond** (United States) **Patrick Galbraith**	**7^{8}**	**7^{7}**

=== Top half ===
First round
1	(Latvia) **L Neiland** (Australia) **M Woodforde**	**6**	**6**
(Australia) E Smylie (United States) K Flach	4	1
(Switzerland) **M Hingis** (South Africa) **C van Rensburg**	**6**	**6**
(United States) D Graham (United States) J Waite	3	3
(United States) **N Arendt** (United States) **L Jensen**	**6**	**6**
(United States) K Rinaldi-Stunkel (United States) T Kronemann	4	3
(Belarus) N Zvereva (United States) S Davis	3	**6**	5
7	(Australia) **R Stubbs** (Australia) **J Eagle**	**6**	4	**7**
4	(Netherlands) **M Bollegraf** (United States) **R Leach**	**6**	3	**6**
(Australia) K-A Guse (United States) D Randall	2	**6**	3
(Australia) **K Radford** (South Africa) **D Adams**	1	**6**	**6**
WC	(United States) A Frazier (United States) J Leach	**6**	3	4
(United States) **K Adams** (Sweden) **R Bergh**	**7^{7}**	3	**6**
(Netherlands) K Boogert (Netherlands) M Oosting	6^{5}	**6**	2
(France) **S Testud** (Australia) **P Kilderry**	0	**7^{7}**	**6**
5	(Romania) I Spîrlea (Belgium) L Pimek	**6**	6^{4}	3

Second round
1	(Latvia) L Neiland (Australia) M Woodforde	**6**	2	5
(Switzerland) **M Hingis** (South Africa) **C van Rensburg**	3	**6**	**7**
(United States) N Arendt (United States) L Jensen	**6**	5	3
7	(Australia) **R Stubbs** (Australia) **J Eagle**	4	**7**	**6**
4	(Netherlands) **M Bollegraf** (United States) **R Leach**	**7**	6^{9}	**7^{7}**
(Australia) K Radford (South Africa) D Adams	5	**7^{11}**	6^{1}
(United States) K Adams (Sweden) R Bergh	4	3
(France) **S Testud** (Australia) **P Kilderry**	**6**	**6**

Quarterfinals
(Switzerland) **M Hingis** (South Africa) **C van Rensburg**	**6**	3	**6**
7	(Australia) R Stubbs (Australia) J Eagle	4	**6**	3
4	(Netherlands) **M Bollegraf** (United States) **R Leach**	w/o
(France) S Testud (Australia) P Kilderry

Semifinals
(Switzerland) M Hingis (South Africa) C van Rensburg	**7**	4	5
4	(Netherlands) **M Bollegraf** (United States) **R Leach**	5	**6**	**7**

=== Bottom half ===
First round
6	(Netherlands) **C Vis** (South Africa) **B Talbot**	w/o
(United States) L Wild (United States) D Johnson
WC	(United States) K Po (United States) M Lucena	**6**	3	4
(Belgium) **E Callens** (Netherlands) **T Kempers**	4	**6**	**6**
(Canada) **J Hetherington** (South Africa) **J-L de Jager**	**7^{7}**	**6**
(United States) Z Garrison-Jackson (United States) G Van Emburgh	6^{3}	4
(South Africa) R Nideffer (United States) F Montana	3	**6**	3
3	(United States) **L Raymond** (United States) **P Galbraith**	**6**	3	**6**
8	(United States) L McNeil (United States) M Keil	**6**	2	6^{6}
(Italy) **L Golarsa** (Australia) **A Florent**	4	**6**	**7^{8}**
(Australia) **R McQuillan** (Australia) **D Macpherson**	**7**	4	**6**
(Japan) N Miyagi (United States) K Kinnear	5	**6**	0
WC	(United States) **T Whitlinger-Jones** (United States) **C Woodruff**	**7**	**6**
(Argentina) P Tarabini (United States) K Jones	5	3
WC	(United States) Mashona Washington (United States) Mashiska Washington	2	1
2	(Czech Republic) **H Suková** (Czech Republic) **C Suk**	**6**	**6**

Second round
6	(Netherlands) **C Vis** (South Africa) **B Talbot**	4	**6**	**7^{8}**
(Belgium) E Callens (Netherlands) T Kempers	**6**	4	6^{6}
(Canada) J Hetherington (South Africa) J-L de Jager	6^{5}	4
3	(United States) **L Raymond** (United States) **P Galbraith**	**7^{7}**	**6**
(Italy) L Golarsa (Australia) A Florent	**6**	2	3
(Australia) **R McQuillan** (Australia) **D Macpherson**	3	**6**	**6**
WC	(United States) T Whitlinger-Jones (United States) C Woodruff	5	1
2	(Czech Republic) **H Suková** (Czech Republic) **C Suk**	**7**	**6**

Quarterfinals
6	(Netherlands) C Vis (South Africa) B Talbot	4	4
3	(United States) **L Raymond** (United States) **P Galbraith**	**6**	**6**
(Australia) **R McQuillan** (Australia) **D Macpherson**	**6**	**7^{7}**
2	(Czech Republic) H Suková (Czech Republic) C Suk	4	6^{5}

Semifinals
3	(United States) **L Raymond** (United States) **P Galbraith**	**6**	3	**6**
(Australia) R McQuillan (Australia) D Macpherson	3	**6**	4
