= 1996 US Open – Women's singles =

Women's singles
- 1996 US Open

Final
- Champion: (Germany) Steffi Graf
- Runner-up: (United States) Monica Seles
- Score: 7–5, 6–4

Details
- Draw: 128
- Seeds: 16 (8 Q / 8 WC )

Events
Singles	men	women		boys	girls
Doubles	men	women	mixed	boys	girls
WC Singles	men	women	quad
WC Doubles	men	women	quad
Legends	men	women	mixed
← 1995 ·	US Open	· 1997 →

Defending champion Steffi Graf defeated Monica Seles in a rematch of the previous year's final, 7–5, 6–4 to win the women's singles tennis title at the 1996 US Open. It was her fifth US Open title and 21st major singles title overall. Graf did not lose a set during the tournament.

This marked the final major appearance of 1990 champion Gabriela Sabatini. It was also the final major singles appearance of 15-time major quarterfinalist and former world No. 4 Zina Garrison.

== Seeds ==
The seeded players are listed below. Steffi Graf is the champion; others show the round in which they were eliminated.

1. (Germany) Steffi Graf (champion)
2. (United States) Monica Seles (final)
3. (Spain) Arantxa Sánchez Vicario (fourth round)
4. (Spain) Conchita Martínez (semifinals)
5. (Croatia) Iva Majoli (first round)
6. (Germany) Anke Huber (first round)
7. (Czech Republic) Jana Novotná (quarterfinals)
8. (United States) Lindsay Davenport (fourth round)
9. (United States) Mary Joe Fernández (withdrew due to wrist injury)

10. (Japan) Kimiko Date (first round)
11. (United States) Chanda Rubin (withdrew due to wrist injury)
12. (Bulgaria) Magdalena Maleeva (first round)
13. (Netherlands) Brenda Schultz-McCarthy (second round)
14. (Austria) Barbara Paulus (third round)
15. (Argentina) Gabriela Sabatini (third round)
16. (Switzerland) Martina Hingis (semifinals)
17. (Slovakia) Karina Habšudová (fourth round)

Click on the seed number of a player to go to their draw section.

Chanda Rubin pulled out before the tournament began and her position in the draw was taken over by seventeenth-seeded Karina Habšudová, Rubin was replaced by lucky loser Annabel Ellwood; Mary Joe Fernández, who withdrew on the first day of the tournament, was replaced by lucky loser Tina Križan.

== Draw ==
=== Key ===
- Q = Qualifier
- WC = Wild card
- LL = Lucky loser
- Alt = Alternate
- ITF = ITF entry
- PR = Protected ranking
- SR = Special ranking
- SE = Special exempt
- JE = Junior exempt
- JR = Junior Accelerator Programme entrant
- CO = College Accelerator Programme entrant
- NG = Next Gen Accelerator Program entrant
- w/o = Walkover
- r = Retired
- d = Defaulted

=== Finals ===
Quarterfinals
1	(Germany) Steffi Graf	7	6
(Austria) Judith Wiesner	5	3
16	(Switzerland) Martina Hingis	7	6
7	(Czech Republic) Jana Novotná	6	4
(United States) Linda Wild	6	0
4	(Spain) Conchita Martínez	7	6
(South Africa) Amanda Coetzer	0	3
2	(United States) Monica Seles	6	6

Semifinals
1	(Germany) Steffi Graf	7	6
16	(Switzerland) Martina Hingis	5	3
4	(Spain) Conchita Martínez	4	3
2	(United States) Monica Seles	6	6

Finals
1	(Germany) Steffi Graf	7	6
2	(United States) Monica Seles	5	4

=== Top half ===
==== Section 1 ====
First round
1	(Germany) S Graf	6	7
(Indonesia) Y Basuki	3	6
(Germany) K Kschwendt	6	6
(Czech Republic) S Kleinová	3	4
(Germany) J Kandarr	2	1
(Japan) A Sugiyama	6	6
(Spain) V Ruano Pascual	2	6
(Belarus) N Zvereva	6	7
Q	(Russia) A Kournikova	7	6
(Czech Republic) L Richterová	6	3
(Italy) N Baudone	6	4	7
(United States) J Watanabe	4	6	6
(United States) G Fernández	1	4
(Bulgaria) E Pampoulova	6	6
(China) J-Q Yi	2	1
14	(Austria) B Paulus	6	6

Second round
1	(Germany) S Graf	6	6
(Germany) K Kschwendt	2	1
(Japan) A Sugiyama	6	4	3
(Belarus) N Zvereva	4	6	6
Q	(Russia) A Kournikova	6	6
(Italy) N Baudone	3	3
(Bulgaria) E Pampoulova	5	6
14	(Austria) B Paulus	7	7

Third round
1	(Germany) S Graf	6	6
(Belarus) N Zvereva	4	2
Q	(Russia) A Kournikova	3	6	6
14	(Austria) B Paulus	6	2	4

Fourth round
1	(Germany) S Graf	6	6
Q	(Russia) A Kournikova	2	1

==== Section 2 ====
First round
LL	(Slovenia) T Križan	7	7
(Japan) R Hiraki	6	5
(Italy) R Grande	6	6
(France) A Dechaume-Balleret	3	0
LL	(Australia) A Ellwood	6	6
(United States) J Capriati	4	4
(Australia) N Bradtke	6	6
(Belgium) E Callens	7	7
(United States) K Adams	4	2
(Czech Republic) P Langrová	6	6
(Japan) N Sawamatsu	6	6
(Australia) R Stubbs	4	3
WC	(United States) D Graham	6	6
Q	(Belgium) S Devillé	4	2
(Austria) J Wiesner	2	6	6
5	(Croatia) I Majoli	6	3	1

Second round
LL	(Slovenia) T Križan	2	0
(Italy) R Grande	6	6
LL	(Australia) A Ellwood	4	6	1
(Belgium) E Callens	6	1	6
(Czech Republic) P Langrová	6	3	7
(Japan) N Sawamatsu	4	6	5
WC	(United States) D Graham	2	5
(Austria) J Wiesner	6	7

Third round
(Italy) R Grande	7	6
(Belgium) E Callens	5	1
(Czech Republic) P Langrová	2	0
(Austria) J Wiesner	6	6

Fourth round
(Italy) R Grande	0	3
(Austria) J Wiesner	6	6

==== Section 3 ====
First round
3	(Spain) A Sánchez Vicario	6	6
Q	(United States) L Poruri	2	1
(United States) N Arendt	6	7
(United States) S Cacic	2	6
(Russia) E Likhovtseva	7	6
(Japan) K Nagatsuka	6	1
(Japan) M Endo	2	2
WC	(United States) L Osterloh	6	6
(Federal Republic of Yugoslavia) T Ječmenica	3	2
(Japan) N Kijimuta	6	6
(France) A Fusai	6	2	7
WC	(United States) J Craybas	1	6	5
(Netherlands) M Oremans	6	4	6
Q	(Slovakia) R Zrubáková	2	6	1
(Spain) Á Montolio	1	4
16	(Switzerland) M Hingis	6	6

Second round
3	(Spain) A Sánchez Vicario	6	6
(United States) N Arendt	2	2
(Russia) E Likhovtseva	6	6
WC	(United States) L Osterloh	4	2
(Japan) N Kijimuta	6	7
(France) A Fusai	4	5
(Netherlands) M Oremans	4	4
16	(Switzerland) M Hingis	6	6

Third round
3	(Spain) A Sánchez Vicario	6	6
(Russia) E Likhovtseva	1	0
(Japan) N Kijimuta	2	2
16	(Switzerland) M Hingis	6	6

Fourth round
3	(Spain) A Sánchez Vicario	1	6	4
16	(Switzerland) M Hingis	6	3	6

==== Section 4 ====
First round
17	(Slovakia) K Habšudová	6	6
(Czech Republic) R Bobková	4	1
(France) N Dechy	6	6
(Germany) C Singer	4	0
(United States) L Lee	3	4
(Finland) N Dahlman	6	6
(Austria) S Dopfer	2	6	7
(United States) Z Garrison-Jackson	6	3	5
(Italy) S Cecchini	2	0
(United States) T Whitlinger-Jones	6	6
(United States) A Frazier	6	6
(Latvia) L Neiland	1	3
WC	(United States) K Rinaldi-Stunkel	2	2
(Argentina) F Labat	6	6
(Italy) F Lubiani	1	5
7	(Czech Republic) J Novotná	6	7

Second round
17	(Slovakia) K Habšudová	6	6
(France) N Dechy	4	2
(Finland) N Dahlman	6	2	3
(Austria) S Dopfer	2	6	6
(United States) T Whitlinger-Jones	7	6
(United States) A Frazier	6	2
(Argentina) F Labat	2	6	2
7	(Czech Republic) J Novotná	6	4	6

Third round
17	(Slovakia) K Habšudová	6	6
(Austria) S Dopfer	2	3
(United States) T Whitlinger-Jones	2	3
7	(Czech Republic) J Novotná	6	6

Fourth round
17	(Slovakia) K Habšudová	2	0
7	(Czech Republic) J Novotná	6	6

=== Bottom half ===
==== Section 5 ====
First round
8	(United States) L Davenport	6	6
Q	(Italy) A Serra Zanetti	2	1
(Slovakia) H Nagyová	6	4	6
(Spain) G León García	1	6	3
(France) A-G Sidot	6	6
(Slovakia) J Husárová	4	4
(United States) C Morariu	4	7	2
(Chinese Taipei) S-t Wang	6	6	6
(South Korea) S-h Park	2	3
(United States) L Wild	6	6
(Netherlands) K Boogert	6	6
(South Africa) J Kruger	1	0
(Germany) B Rittner	7	7
(Slovakia) K Studeníková	5	5
(Japan) N Miyagi	1	4
13	(Netherlands) B Schultz-McCarthy	6	6

Second round
8	(United States) L Davenport	6	6
(Slovakia) H Nagyová	0	4
(France) A-G Sidot	6	3	6
(Chinese Taipei) S-t Wang	4	6	3
(United States) L Wild	5	6	6
(Netherlands) K Boogert	7	3	3
(Germany) B Rittner	6	6
13	(Netherlands) B Schultz-McCarthy	2	1

Third round
8	(United States) L Davenport	6	6
(France) A-G Sidot	0	3
(United States) L Wild	6	4	7
(Germany) B Rittner	4	6	5

Fourth round
8	(United States) L Davenport	2	6	0
(United States) L Wild	6	3	6

==== Section 6 ====
First round
15	(Argentina) G Sabatini	6	6
(Canada) P Hy-Boulais	1	1
(United States) A Grossman	6	6
(Italy) S Farina	4	3
(Italy) G Pizzichini	6	1	5
(Sweden) Å Carlsson	3	6	7
(Austria) B Schett	1	6	6
(Belgium) S Appelmans	6	4	4
(United States) M Werdel-Witmeyer	4	3
(Argentina) P Suárez	6	6
(Japan) Y Kamio	2	3
(Czech Republic) H Suková	6	6
(France) N Tauziat	7	6
Q	(Mexico) A Gavaldón	6	2
(Romania) R Dragomir	2	0
4	(Spain) C Martínez	6	6

Second round
15	(Argentina) G Sabatini	6	6
(United States) A Grossman	2	3
(Sweden) Å Carlsson	6	3
(Austria) B Schett	2	1	r
(Argentina) P Suárez	4	6
(Czech Republic) H Suková	6	7
(France) N Tauziat	1	3
4	(Spain) C Martínez	6	6

Third round
15	(Argentina) G Sabatini	5	6	2
(Sweden) Å Carlsson	7	3	6
(Czech Republic) H Suková	4	3
4	(Spain) C Martínez	6	6

Fourth round
(Sweden) Å Carlsson	2	1
4	(Spain) C Martínez	6	6

==== Section 7 ====
First round
6	(Germany) A Huber	1	6	2
(South Africa) A Coetzer	6	2	6
(Belgium) D Van Roost	6	2	6
(South Africa) M de Swardt	1	6	7
(Romania) I Spîrlea	6	6
(Germany) P Begerow	3	2
Q	(Argentina) MJ Gaidano	6	6
(Austria) M Schnell	4	0
(United States) L McNeil	6	3
(United States) L Raymond	7	6
WC	(United States) M Shaughnessy	3	3
(France) S Pitkowski	6	6
WC	(United States) K Brandi	6	6
(Germany) A Glass	2	3
(United States) K Po	6	7
10	(Japan) K Date	2	5

Second round
(South Africa) A Coetzer	6	7
(South Africa) M de Swardt	2	5
(Romania) I Spîrlea	6	6
Q	(Argentina) MJ Gaidano	1	2
(United States) L Raymond	6	6
(France) S Pitkowski	2	0
WC	(United States) K Brandi	1	4
(United States) K Po	6	6

Third round
(South Africa) A Coetzer	7	7
(Romania) I Spîrlea	6	5
(United States) L Raymond	6	6
(United States) K Po	3	2

Fourth round
(South Africa) A Coetzer	6	6
(United States) L Raymond	4	1

==== Section 8 ====
First round
12	(Bulgaria) M Maleeva	4	2
Q	(Poland) A Olsza	6	6
(Argentina) I Gorrochategui	4	6	6
(Poland) M Grzybowska	6	4	1
(Spain) C Torrens Valero	2	6	6
(Germany) S Hack	6	4	2
(France) S Testud	7	6
WC	(United States) P Shriver	5	2
WC	(United States) J Chi	6	1	6
(Spain) M Sánchez Lorenzo	4	6	3
(Madagascar) D Randriantefy	6	1	7
(Russia) E Makarova	3	6	5
(Italy) F Perfetti	4	6	2
(Belgium) L Courtois	6	3	6
(United States) A Miller	0	1
2	(United States) M Seles	6	6

Second round
Q	(Poland) A Olsza	1	1
(Argentina) I Gorrochategui	6	6
(Spain) C Torrens Valero	2	1
(France) S Testud	6	6
WC	(United States) J Chi	3	1
(Madagascar) D Randriantefy	6	6
(Belgium) L Courtois
2	(United States) M Seles	w/o

Third round
(Argentina) I Gorrochategui	6	2	1
(France) S Testud	4	6	6
(Madagascar) D Randriantefy	0	2
2	(United States) M Seles	6	6

Fourth round
(France) S Testud	5	0
2	(United States) M Seles	7	6

== See also ==
- 1996 US Open – Men's singles

Preceded by 1996 Wimbledon Championships – Women's singles	Grand Slam women's singles	Succeeded by 1997 Australian Open – Women's singles
