= 1996 US Open – Women's doubles =

Women's doubles
- 1996 US Open

Final
- Champions: (United States) Gigi Fernández (Belarus) Natasha Zvereva
- Runners-up: (Czech Republic) Jana Novotná (Spain) Arantxa Sánchez Vicario
- Score: 1–6, 6–1, 6–4

Details
- Draw: 64 (4 Q / 4 WC )
- Seeds: 16

Events
Singles	men	women		boys	girls
Doubles	men	women	mixed	boys	girls
WC Singles	men	women	quad
WC Doubles	men	women	quad
Legends	men	women	mixed
← 1995 ·	US Open	· 1997 →

Defending champions Gigi Fernández and Natasha Zvereva defeated Jana Novotná and Arantxa Sánchez Vicario in the final, 1–6, 6–1, 6–4 to win the women's doubles tennis title at the 1996 US Open. It was Fernández' fifth US Open, 15th major and 66th overall title for Fernández, and Zvereva's fourth US Open, 15th major and 60th overall title.

== Seeds ==
1. (Czech Republic) Jana Novotná / (Spain) Arantxa Sánchez Vicario (final)
2. (United States) Gigi Fernández / (Belarus) Natasha Zvereva (champions)
3. n/a
4. (Switzerland) Martina Hingis / (Czech Republic) Helena Suková (semifinals)
5. (United States) Nicole Arendt / (Netherlands) Manon Bollegraf (quarterfinals)
6. (United States) Lori McNeil / (Argentina) Gabriela Sabatini (semifinals)
7. (United States) Lisa Raymond / (Australia) Rennae Stubbs (second round)
8. (Netherlands) Brenda Schultz-McCarthy / (France) Nathalie Tauziat (first round)
9. (United States) Katrina Adams / (South Africa) Mariaan de Swardt (second round)
10. (Australia) Elizabeth Smylie / (United States) Linda Wild (first round)
11. (Indonesia) Yayuk Basuki / (Netherlands) Caroline Vis (third round)
12. (Netherlands) Kristie Boogert / (Romania) Irina Spîrlea (third round)
13. (United States) Zina Garrison-Jackson / (United States) Pam Shriver (first round)
14. (Spain) Conchita Martínez / (Argentina) Patricia Tarabini (third round)
15. (Japan) Rika Hiraki / (Japan) Nana Miyagi (third round)
16. (United States) Debbie Graham / (Australia) Kristine Radford (third round)
17. (France) Alexia Dechaume-Balleret / (France) Sandrine Testud (third round)

== Draw ==
=== Key ===
- Q = Qualifier
- WC = Wild card
- LL = Lucky loser
- Alt = Alternate
- ITF = ITF entry
- PR = Protected ranking
- SR = Special ranking
- SE = Special exempt
- JE = Junior exempt
- JR = Junior Accelerator Programme entrant
- CO = College Accelerator Programme entrant
- NG = Next Gen Accelerator Program entrant
- w/o = Walkover
- r = Retired
- d = Defaulted

=== Finals ===
Quarterfinals
1	(Czech Republic) Jana Novotná (Spain) Arantxa Sánchez Vicario	7	6
(Russia) Anna Kournikova (Russia) Elena Likhovtseva	5	2
4	(Switzerland) Martina Hingis (Czech Republic) Helena Suková	6	6
(Canada) Patricia Hy-Boulais (South Africa) Rosalyn Nideffer	4	4
6	(United States) Lori McNeil (Argentina) Gabriela Sabatini	4	6	7
5	(United States) Nicole Arendt (Netherlands) Manon Bollegraf	6	3	5
(Canada) Sonya Jeyaseelan (Canada) Rene Simpson	3	7	2
2	(United States) Gigi Fernández (Belarus) Natasha Zvereva	6	6	6

Semifinals
1	(Czech Republic) Jana Novotná (Spain) Arantxa Sánchez Vicario	6	1	6
4	(Switzerland) Martina Hingis (Czech Republic) Helena Suková	1	6	1
6	(United States) Lori McNeil (Argentina) Gabriela Sabatini	2	6
2	(United States) Gigi Fernández (Belarus) Natasha Zvereva	6	7

Final
1	(Czech Republic) Jana Novotná (Spain) Arantxa Sánchez Vicario	6	1	4
2	(United States) Gigi Fernández (Belarus) Natasha Zvereva	1	6	6

=== Top half ===
==== Section 1 ====
First round
1	(Czech Republic) J Novotná (Spain) A Sánchez Vicario	6	6
Q	(Japan) M Saeki (Japan) Y Yoshida	1	1
(Australia) N Bradtke (Australia) R McQuillan	6	6
(Italy) L Golarsa (Germany) C Singer	4	2
LL	(Hungary) V Csurgó (Poland) M Grzybowska	6	4	2
(Netherlands) S Noorlander (France) S Pitkowski	4	6	6
(Finland) N Dahlman (United Kingdom) C Wood	6	3	2
15	(Japan) R Hiraki (Japan) N Miyagi	3	6	6
10	(Australia) E Smylie (United States) L Wild	4	4
(United States) A Lettiere (United States) C Morariu	6	6
(Czech Republic) L Cenková (Poland) A Olsza	6	6
Q	(South Africa) L Horn (South Africa) J Kruger	1	2
(Czech Republic) R Bobková (Czech Republic) E Melicharová	3	6	6
(Russia) A Kournikova (Russia) E Likhovtseva	6	3	7
(Australia) A Ellwood (Australia) N Pratt	3	4
9	(United States) K Adams (South Africa) M de Swardt	6	6

Second round
1	(Czech Republic) J Novotná (Spain) A Sánchez Vicario	6	6	6
(Australia) N Bradtke (Australia) R McQuillan	7	3	2
(Netherlands) S Noorlander (France) S Pitkowski	6	2	2
15	(Japan) R Hiraki (Japan) N Miyagi	4	6	6
(United States) A Lettiere (United States) C Morariu	3	6	6
(Czech Republic) L Cenková (Poland) A Olsza	6	1	1
(Russia) A Kournikova (Russia) E Likhovtseva	7	4
9	(United States) K Adams (South Africa) M de Swardt	6	1^{r}

Third round
1	(Czech Republic) J Novotná (Spain) A Sánchez Vicario	6	6
15	(Japan) R Hiraki (Japan) N Miyagi	4	2
(United States) A Lettiere (United States) C Morariu	2	7	2
(Russia) A Kournikova (Russia) E Likhovtseva	6	6	6

Quarterfinals
1	(Czech Republic) J Novotná (Spain) A Sánchez Vicario	7	6
(Russia) A Kournikova (Russia) E Likhovtseva	5	2

==== Section 2 ====
First round
4	(Switzerland) M Hingis (Czech Republic) H Suková	6	6
(Slovakia) H Nagyová (Slovakia) K Studeníková	0	3
Q	(Argentina) M-F Landa (Germany) M Weingärtner	2	2
(Sweden) Å Carlsson (Sweden) M Strandlund	6	6
(South Africa) A Coetzer (Argentina) I Gorrochategui	6	6
(Japan) K Nagatsuka (Japan) A Sugiyama	3	3
(United States) M Werdel-Witmeyer (United States) T Whitlinger-Jones	3	6	5
11	(Indonesia) Y Basuki (Netherlands) C Vis	6	3	7
13	(United States) Z Garrison-Jackson (United States) P Shriver	5	4
(Argentina) L Montalvo (Germany) B Rittner	7	6
(Slovenia) T Križan (Greece) C Papadáki	3	6
(Italy) R Grande (Russia) E Makarova	6	7
(Czech Republic) P Langrová (Slovakia) R Zrubáková	4	2
(Japan) N Kijimuta (Argentina) F Labat	6	6
(Canada) P Hy-Boulais (South Africa) R Nideffer	7	6
8	(Netherlands) B Schultz-McCarthy (France) N Tauziat	5	1

Second round
4	(Switzerland) M Hingis (Czech Republic) H Suková	6	6
(Sweden) Å Carlsson (Sweden) M Strandlund	2	4
(South Africa) A Coetzer (Argentina) I Gorrochategui	3	0^{r}
11	(Indonesia) Y Basuki (Netherlands) C Vis	6	1
(Argentina) L Montalvo (Germany) B Rittner	2	6
(Italy) R Grande (Russia) E Makarova	6	7
(Japan) N Kijimuta (Argentina) F Labat	6	4	6
(Canada) P Hy-Boulais (South Africa) R Nideffer	1	6	7

Third round
4	(Switzerland) M Hingis (Czech Republic) H Suková	6	3	7
11	(Indonesia) Y Basuki (Netherlands) C Vis	3	6	5
(Italy) R Grande (Russia) E Makarova	1	1
(Canada) P Hy-Boulais (South Africa) R Nideffer	6	6

Quarterfinals
4	(Switzerland) M Hingis (Czech Republic) H Suková	6	6
(Canada) P Hy-Boulais (South Africa) R Nideffer	4	4

=== Bottom half ===
==== Section 3 ====
First round
6	(United States) L McNeil (Argentina) G Sabatini	6	7
(Slovakia) D Krajčovičová (Czech Republic) L Němečková	2	5
(Italy) S Cecchini (Italy) L Garrone	2	1
(Canada) J Hetherington (United States) K Rinaldi-Stunkel	6	6
WC	(United States) L Osterloh (United States) S Reeves	7	3	1
(Belgium) S Appelmans (Netherlands) M Oremans	6	6	6
(Germany) K Kschwendt (Austria) B Schett	7	1	3
12	(Netherlands) K Boogert (Romania) I Spîrlea	5	6	6
14	(Spain) C Martínez (Argentina) P Tarabini	6	1	6
(Ukraine) O Lugina (Bulgaria) E Pampoulova	2	6	2
(United States) A Frazier (United States) K Po	6	3	2
(South Korea) S-h Park (Chinese Taipei) S-t Wang	4	6	6
WC	(United States) J Lee (United States) L Lee	6	7
WC	(United States) A deLone (United States) L Poruri	4	6
(Sweden) M Lindström (Australia) L Pleming	4	0
5	(United States) N Arendt (Netherlands) M Bollegraf	6	6

Second round
6	(United States) L McNeil (Argentina) G Sabatini	6	6
(Canada) J Hetherington (United States) K Rinaldi-Stunkel	1	1
(Belgium) S Appelmans (Netherlands) M Oremans	1	0
12	(Netherlands) K Boogert (Romania) I Spîrlea	6	6
14	(Spain) C Martínez (Argentina) P Tarabini	6	7
(South Korea) S-h Park (Chinese Taipei) S-t Wang	2	5
WC	(United States) J Lee (United States) L Lee	4	7	1
5	(United States) N Arendt (Netherlands) M Bollegraf	6	5	6

Third round
6	(United States) L McNeil (Argentina) G Sabatini	6	6
12	(Netherlands) K Boogert (Romania) I Spîrlea	4	2
14	(Spain) C Martínez (Argentina) P Tarabini	5	5
5	(United States) N Arendt (Netherlands) M Bollegraf	7	7

Quarterfinals
6	(United States) L McNeil (Argentina) G Sabatini	4	6	7
5	(United States) N Arendt (Netherlands) M Bollegraf	6	3	5

==== Section 4 ====
First round
7	(United States) L Raymond (Australia) R Stubbs	6	6
WC	(United States) D Buth (United States) S Nickitas	1	2
(Germany) A Huber (Croatia) I Majoli	4	4
(Canada) S Jeyaseelan (Canada) R Simpson	6	6
(United States) A Grossman (United States) S Reece	3	4
(Australia) C Barclay (Australia) K-A Guse	6	6
(Spain) V Ruano Pascual (Hungary) A Temesvári	6	7	3
17	(France) A Dechaume-Balleret (France) S Testud	7	6	6
16	(United States) D Graham (Australia) K Radford	4	7	7
(France) A Fusai (Argentina) M Paz	6	5	6
LL	(Australia) J Byrne (Australia) T Morton-Rodgers	6	6
Q	(United States) J Chi (United States) K Pace	2	4
(Croatia) M Murić (Argentina) P Suárez	3	4
(Romania) R Dragomir (Federal Republic of Yugoslavia) T Ječmenica	6	6
(Slovakia) J Husárová (Belgium) D van Roost	6	3	0
2	(United States) G Fernández (Belarus) N Zvereva	4	6	6

Second round
7	(United States) L Raymond (Australia) R Stubbs	4	3
(Canada) S Jeyaseelan (Canada) R Simpson	6	6
(Australia) C Barclay (Australia) K-A Guse	5	1
17	(France) A Dechaume-Balleret (France) S Testud	7	6
16	(United States) D Graham (Australia) K Radford	6	6
LL	(Australia) J Byrne (Australia) T Morton-Rodgers	2	4
(Romania) R Dragomir (Federal Republic of Yugoslavia) T Ječmenica	1	0
2	(United States) G Fernández (Belarus) N Zvereva	6	6

Third round
(Canada) S Jeyaseelan (Canada) R Simpson	7	6
17	(France) A Dechaume-Balleret (France) S Testud	5	3
16	(United States) D Graham (Australia) K Radford	3	6
2	(United States) G Fernández (Belarus) N Zvereva	6	7

Quarterfinals
(Canada) S Jeyaseelan (Canada) R Simpson	3	7	2
2	(United States) G Fernández (Belarus) N Zvereva	6	6	6
