= 1996 US Open – Men's singles =

Men's singles
- 1996 US Open

Final
- Champion: (United States) Pete Sampras
- Runner-up: (United States) Michael Chang
- Score: 6–1, 6–4, 7–6^{(7–3)}

Details
- Draw: 128
- Seeds: 16

Events
Singles	men	women		boys	girls
Doubles	men	women	mixed	boys	girls
WC Singles	men	women	quad
WC Doubles	men	women	quad
Legends	men	women	mixed
- US Open

Defending champion Pete Sampras defeated Michael Chang in the final, 6–1, 6–4, 7–6^{(7–3)} to win the men's singles tennis title at the 1996 US Open. It was his fourth US Open title and eighth major title overall. Sampras saved a match point en route to the title, in the quarterfinals against Àlex Corretja. There, Sampras had a stomach bug and vomited during the fifth set, prompting a warning from the referee for delaying the match. He eventually won the third set in a tiebreak, 7–6^{(9–7)}.

In the draw for the tournament, there were accusations of American favoritism as world No. 3 Michael Chang, world No. 8 Andre Agassi, and world No. 9 Jim Courier (all Americans) were seeded above their ATP ranking at numbers 2, 6, and 8 respectively. Other top players were also seeded above their ranking, including world No. 6 Goran Ivanišević (seeded fourth) and world No. 7 Richard Krajicek (seeded fifth). Conversely, other players were seeded below their world ranking, including world No. 2 Thomas Muster (seeded third), world No. 5 Boris Becker (seeded sixth), and world No. 4 Yevgeny Kafelnikov (seeded seventh). Becker eventually withdrew from the tournament with an injury, and Kafelnikov withdrew from the tournament in protest of the seeding.

This tournament marked the last major singles appearance of six-time major singles champion Stefan Edberg; he lost to Ivanišević in the quarterfinals. It was also the first appearance of future world No. 2 Tommy Haas, who lost to compatriot Michael Stich in the first round.

== Seeds ==
The seeded players are listed below. Pete Sampras is the champion; others show the round in which they were eliminated.

1. (United States) Pete Sampras (champion)
2. (United States) Michael Chang (final)
3. (Austria) Thomas Muster (quarterfinals)
4. (Croatia) Goran Ivanišević (semifinals)
5. (Netherlands) Richard Krajicek (first round)
6. (United States) Andre Agassi (semifinals)
7. (Russia) Yevgeny Kafelnikov (withdrew)
8. (United States) Jim Courier (withdrew)
9. (South Africa) Wayne Ferreira (first round)
10. (Chile) Marcelo Ríos (second round)
11. (United States) MaliVai Washington (second round)
12. (United States) Todd Martin (third round)
13. (Sweden) Thomas Enqvist (fourth round)
14. (Spain) Albert Costa (first round)
15. (Switzerland) Marc Rosset (first round)
16. (France) Cédric Pioline (third round)
17. (Spain) Félix Mantilla (second round)

Click on the seed number of a player to go to their draw section.

== Draw ==
Key

- Q = Qualifier
- WC = Wild card
- LL = Lucky loser
- Alt = Alternate
- ITF = ITF entry
- PR = Protected ranking
- SR = Special ranking
- SE = Special exempt
- JE = Junior exempt
- JR = Junior Accelerator Programme entrant
- CO = College Accelerator Programme entrant
- NG = Next Gen Accelerator Program entrant
- w/o = Walkover
- r = Retired
- d = Defaulted

=== Final eight ===
Quarterfinals
1	(United States) Pete Sampras	7^{7}	5	5	6	7^{9}
(Spain) Àlex Corretja	6^{5}	7	7	4	6^{7}
4	(Croatia) Goran Ivanišević	6	6	7^{11}
(Sweden) Stefan Edberg	3	4	6^{9}
6	(United States) Andre Agassi	6	7	4	6
3	(Austria) Thomas Muster	2	5	6	2
(Spain) Javier Sánchez	5	3	7^{7}	3
2	(United States) Michael Chang	7	6	6^{2}	6

Semifinals
1	(United States) Pete Sampras	6	6	6^{9}	6
4	(Croatia) Goran Ivanišević	3	4	7^{11}	3
6	(United States) Andre Agassi	3	2	2
2	(United States) Michael Chang	6	6	6

Final
1	(United States) Pete Sampras	6	6	7^{7}
2	(United States) Michael Chang	1	4	6^{3}

=== Top half ===
==== Section 1 ====
First round
1	(United States) P Sampras	6	6	6
LL	(Venezuela) J Szymanski	2	2	1
(Czech Republic) J Novák	6	6	6
Q	(Australia) B Ellwood	2	4	3
(Sweden) M Larsson	7^{7}	4	2^{r}
(Russia) A Volkov	6^{5}	6	5
(Sweden) M Tillström	1	7^{9}	6	3	6
Q	(Egypt) T El-Sawy	6	6^{7}	1	6	4
Q	(Australia) P Cash	4	3	2
(Russia) A Olhovskiy	6	6	6
(Australia) M Woodforde	7^{8}	3	3	3
(Australia) M Philippoussis	6^{6}	6	6	6
(Spain) R Carretero	6	4	6	1
(Spain) J Burillo	3	6	0	0^{r}
(Spain) F Clavet	4	6^{3}	4
16	(France) C Pioline	6	7^{7}	6

Second round
1	(United States) P Sampras	6	1	6	4	6
(Czech Republic) J Novák	3	6	3	6	4
(Russia) A Volkov	1	6	6	4	7^{10}
(Sweden) M Tillström	6	4	1	6	6^{8}
(Russia) A Olhovskiy	3	4	2
(Australia) M Philippoussis	6	6	6
(Spain) R Carretero	6	2	2	1
16	(France) C Pioline	4	6	6	6

Third round
1	(United States) P Sampras	6	6	6
(Russia) A Volkov	3	4	2
(Australia) M Philippoussis	6	6	6
16	(France) C Pioline	3	2	4

Fourth round
1	(United States) P Sampras	6	6	6
(Australia) M Philippoussis	3	3	4

==== Section 2 ====
First round
9	(South Africa) W Ferreira	4	4	6	5
Q	(South Africa) D Nainkin	6	6	2	7
(Slovakia) K Kučera	2	7	6^{3}	5
(Sweden) J Björkman	6	5	7^{7}	7
Q	(Switzerland) F Veglio	1	6	6	6
(Norway) C Ruud	6	2	4	4
(Spain) A Corretja	7^{8}	3	6	6
(Zimbabwe) B Black	6^{6}	6	2	2
(Czech Republic) D Rikl	6	7	6
(Morocco) H Arazi	4	5	2
(Netherlands) S Schalken	6	6	6^{6}	6
(Austria) G Schaller	3	4	7^{8}	3
(South Africa) G Stafford	6	6	4	6^{2}	3
(France) G Forget	3	2	6	7^{7}	6
(Brazil) F Meligeni	1	7^{7}	6^{5}	3
17	(Spain) F Mantilla	6	6^{2}	7^{7}	6

Second round
Q	(South Africa) D Nainkin	4	1	1
(Sweden) J Björkman	6	6	6
Q	(Switzerland) F Veglio	7^{7}	4	4	0
(Spain) A Corretja	6^{4}	6	6	6
(Czech Republic) D Rikl	2	4	4
(Netherlands) S Schalken	6	6	6
(France) G Forget	6	7	6
17	(Spain) F Mantilla	4	5	3

Third round
(Sweden) J Björkman	2	6	6	4	3
(Spain) A Corretja	6	4	4	6	6
(Netherlands) S Schalken	2	5	6	6	0
(France) G Forget	6	7	4	4	6

Fourth round
(Spain) A Corretja	6	6	7^{7}
(France) G Forget	4	3	6^{5}

==== Section 3 ====
First round
4	(Croatia) G Ivanišević	1	6	6	6
(Russia) A Chesnokov	6	2	4	4
(Australia) S Draper	6	7	6
(Spain) G Blanco	3	5	3
(Italy) R Furlan	6	6	5	1	5
(Sweden) T Johansson	4	2	7	6	7
(Germany) H Dreekmann	6	6	6
(United Kingdom) G Rusedski	2	4	2
(Ukraine) A Medvedev	6	6	6
(France) J-P Fleurian	2	0	1
(Slovakia) J Krošlák	2	6	3	6	7
(United States) C Woodruff	6	4	6	2	6
Q	(United States) D Caldwell	3	6	3	5
(Czech Republic) P Korda	6	3	6	7
(Czech Republic) B Ulihrach	2	6	7^{7}	3	6
14	(Spain) A Costa	6	4	6^{2}	6	1

Second round
4	(Croatia) G Ivanišević	6^{1}	6	6	6
(Australia) S Draper	7^{7}	3	4	4
(Sweden) T Johansson	6^{1}	2	6	1
(Germany) H Dreekmann	7^{7}	6	4	6
(Ukraine) A Medvedev	6	6	6
(Slovakia) J Krošlák	4	3	2
(Czech Republic) P Korda	6	7^{7}	6
(Czech Republic) B Ulihrach	0	6^{5}	3

Third round
4	(Croatia) G Ivanišević	6	6	7^{13}
(Germany) H Dreekmann	3	2	6^{11}
(Ukraine) A Medvedev	6	6	6
(Czech Republic) P Korda	2	4	3

Fourth round
4	(Croatia) G Ivanišević	6	3	6	7^{7}
(Ukraine) A Medvedev	4	6	3	6^{2}

==== Section 4 ====
First round
12	(United States) T Martin	6	6	4	6
(Morocco) Y El Aynaoui	3	2	6	4
(Italy) A Gaudenzi	7^{7}	6	6
(Japan) S Matsuoka	6^{4}	2	3
WC	(United States) D Flach	7	7^{7}	2	7^{8}
Q	(Italy) G Pozzi	5	6^{5}	6	6^{6}
LL	(Brazil) R Jabali	2	3	4
(United Kingdom) T Henman	6	6	6
(Netherlands) P Haarhuis	6^{5}	7^{8}	1	6	6
(United States) M Joyce	7^{7}	6^{6}	6	2	2
(Australia) M Tebbutt	3	6	3	7	6
(United States) R Reneberg	6	1	6	5	3
(United States) J Stark	5	3	7	5
(Germany) B Karbacher	7	6	5	7
(Sweden) S Edberg	6	6	6
5	(Netherlands) R Krajicek	3	3	3

Second round
12	(United States) T Martin	6	6	6
(Italy) A Gaudenzi	3	2	2
WC	(United States) D Flach	3	4	2
(United Kingdom) T Henman	6	6	6
(Netherlands) P Haarhuis	1	6	6	6
(Australia) M Tebbutt	6	2	2	3
(Germany) B Karbacher	6	3	3	0	r
(Sweden) S Edberg	3	6	6	1

Third round
12	(United States) T Martin	2	6^{4}	4
(United Kingdom) T Henman	6	7^{7}	6
(Netherlands) P Haarhuis	4	6^{4}	1
(Sweden) S Edberg	6	7^{7}	6

Fourth round
(United Kingdom) T Henman	7^{7}	6^{2}	4	4
(Sweden) S Edberg	6^{2}	7^{7}	6	6

=== Bottom half ===
==== Section 5 ====
First round
6	(United States) A Agassi	6	6	6
(Colombia) M Hadad	3	3	2
(South Africa) M Ondruska	6^{3}	2	5
LL	(India) L Paes	7^{7}	6	7
(Spain) C Moyá	6	6^{4}	6^{1}	6	6
WC	(United States) S Humphries	1	7^{7}	7^{7}	0	4
(Netherlands) J Siemerink	4	6	7^{7}	6
(Germany) C-U Steeb	6	1	6^{4}	4
Q	(France) F Vitoux	6	6	7^{7}
Q	(Paraguay) R Delgado	4	4	6^{3}
WC	(United States) D Wheaton	6	6	6
WC	(United States) K Kim	3	2	3
(Ecuador) N Lapentti	4	6	4	3
WC	(United States) A O'Brien	6	1	6	6
(Morocco) K Alami	2	6	6^{5}	1
11	(United States) M Washington	6	2	7^{7}	6

Second round
6	(United States) A Agassi	3	6	6	6
LL	(India) L Paes	6	4	1	0
(Spain) C Moyá	6^{2}	4	4
(Netherlands) J Siemerink	7^{7}	6	6
Q	(France) F Vitoux	4	4	6	6^{4}
WC	(United States) D Wheaton	6	6	4	7^{7}
WC	(United States) A O'Brien	6	6	5	3	6
11	(United States) M Washington	3	4	7	6	3

Third round
6	(United States) A Agassi	6	6	7^{9}
(Netherlands) J Siemerink	4	2	6^{7}
WC	(United States) D Wheaton	1	7	6	6
WC	(United States) A O'Brien	6	5	1	2

Fourth round
6	(United States) A Agassi	4	6	6	6
WC	(United States) D Wheaton	6	2	3	4

==== Section 6 ====
First round
13	(Sweden) T Enqvist	6	6	6
(France) S Simian	3	1	4
(France) G Raoux	7^{7}	3	1	6	7
(Belgium) F Dewulf	6^{5}	6	6	3	5
(The Bahamas) M Knowles	6	7	6
(Uruguay) M Filippini	3	5	1
(Australia) T Woodbridge	2	6	2	4
Q	(Ecuador) P Campana	6	4	6	6
(Belgium) K Goossens	2	0	6^{1}
(Spain) S Bruguera	6	6	7^{7}
Q	(Germany) T Haas	3	6	1	5
(Germany) M Stich	6	1	6	7
Q	(Germany) D Dier	6	2	6	6
(United States) C Adams	4	6	4	4
(Argentina) J Frana	1	6^{2}	2
3	(Austria) T Muster	6	7^{7}	6

Second round
13	(Sweden) T Enqvist	6	6	6
(France) G Raoux	3	2	3
(The Bahamas) M Knowles	6^{3}	6	3	7^{7}	3
Q	(Ecuador) P Campana	7^{7}	3	6	6^{3}	6
(Spain) S Bruguera	6	6	6
(Germany) M Stich	3	2	4
Q	(Germany) D Dier	3	2	4
3	(Austria) T Muster	6	6	6

Third round
13	(Sweden) T Enqvist	6	6	6
Q	(Ecuador) P Campana	4	4	2
(Spain) S Bruguera	2	4	3
3	(Austria) T Muster	6	6	6

Fourth round
13	(Sweden) T Enqvist	6^{4}	2	6	1
3	(Austria) T Muster	7^{7}	6	4	6

==== Section 7 ====
First round
LL	(Czech Republic) D Škoch	2	6^{0}	3
(Spain) J Sánchez	6	7^{7}	6
WC	(United States) J Grabb	6	7	7^{7}
(Australia) S Stolle	3	5	6^{4}
(Australia) P Rafter	6^{7}	3	6^{6}
(Denmark) K Carlsen	7^{9}	6	7^{8}
(Australia) J Stoltenberg	7	6	6
(Italy) S Pescosolido	5	4	1
(France) A Boetsch	7^{7}	6	7
(Venezuela) N Pereira	6^{4}	4	5
(Spain) C Costa	5	6	6^{4}	3
(Sweden) M Gustafsson	7	4	7^{7}	6
(United States) J Tarango	6^{5}	6	6	3
(Germany) A Rădulescu	7^{7}	4	1	1^{r}
Q	(Romania) A Pavel	6	1	4	2
10	(Chile) M Ríos	4	6	6	6

Second round
(Spain) J Sánchez	6	7^{7}	2	6
WC	(United States) J Grabb	2	6^{3}	6	3
(Denmark) K Carlsen	3	6^{1}	3
(Australia) J Stoltenberg	6	7^{7}	6
(France) A Boetsch	7^{8}	6	6
(Sweden) M Gustafsson	6^{6}	3	1
(United States) J Tarango	6	4	7^{7}	6
10	(Chile) M Ríos	4	6	6^{5}	2

Third round
(Spain) J Sánchez	6	3	4	6	7^{8}
(Australia) J Stoltenberg	4	6	6	2	6^{6}
(France) A Boetsch	6	6	7^{8}
(United States) J Tarango	4	2	6^{6}

Fourth round
(Spain) J Sánchez	6	7^{7}	7^{7}
(France) A Boetsch	4	6^{5}	6^{3}

==== Section 8 ====
First round
15	(Switzerland) M Rosset	7^{9}	4	4	3
WC	(United States) J Palmer	6^{7}	6	6	6
(Czech Republic) M Damm	5	4	5
(Argentina) H Gumy	7	6	7
(Sweden) N Kulti	3	4	6	4
(Switzerland) J Hlasek	6	6	4	6
WC	(United States) C Mamiit	1	4	0
(Spain) A Berasategui	6	6	6
(United States) V Spadea	6	3	6	6
(Czech Republic) D Vacek	2	6	3	2
(Germany) D Prinosil	6	6	3	6^{5}	6
Q	(Australia) P Tramacchi	3	2	6	7^{7}	1
Q	(South Africa) N Godwin	6	6	3	6
(Spain) T Carbonell	4	2	6	1
Q	(Brazil) J Oncins	6	1	0	6^{6}
2	(United States) M Chang	3	6	6	7^{8}

Second round
WC	(United States) J Palmer	7^{7}	3	6^{4}	6	6^{1}
(Argentina) H Gumy	6^{5}	6	7^{7}	0	7^{7}
(Switzerland) J Hlasek	7^{7}	7^{9}	6
(Spain) A Berasategui	6^{5}	6^{7}	0
(United States) V Spadea	6	1	6	6
(Germany) D Prinosil	2	6	2	4
Q	(South Africa) N Godwin	1	3	1
2	(United States) M Chang	6	6	6

Third round
(Argentina) H Gumy	5	1	2
(Switzerland) J Hlasek	7	6	6
(United States) V Spadea	4	7	6	5	3
2	(United States) M Chang	6	5	2	7	6

Fourth round
(Switzerland) J Hlasek	3	4	2
2	(United States) M Chang	6	6	6

Preceded by 1996 Wimbledon Championships – Men's singles	Grand Slam men's singles	Succeeded by 1997 Australian Open – Men's singles
