= 1996 US Open (tennis) =

- Date: August 26 – September 8
- Edition: 116th
- Category: Grand Slam (ITF)
- Surface: Hardcourt
- Location: New York City, New York, United States

Champions

Men's singles
- (United States) Pete Sampras

Women's singles
- (Germany) Steffi Graf

Men's doubles
- (Australia) Todd Woodbridge / (Australia) Mark Woodforde

Women's doubles
- (United States) Gigi Fernández / (Belarus) Natasha Zvereva

Mixed doubles
- (United States) Lisa Raymond / (United States) Patrick Galbraith

Boys' singles
- (Germany) Daniel Elsner

Girls' singles
- (Croatia) Mirjana Lučić

Boys' doubles
- (United States) Bob Bryan / (United States) Mike Bryan

Girls' doubles
- (South Africa) Surina de Beer / (South Africa) Jessica Steck
- US Open

The 1996 US Open was a tennis tournament played on outdoor hard courts at the USTA National Tennis Center in New York City in New York in the United States. It was the 116th edition of the US Open and was held from August 26 through September 8, 1996.

== Seniors ==
=== Men's singles ===
(United States) Pete Sampras defeated (United States) Michael Chang 6–1, 6–4, 7–6^{(7–3)}

- It was Sampras' 8th career Grand Slam title and his 4th US Open title.

=== Women's singles ===
(Germany) Steffi Graf defeated (United States) Monica Seles 7–5, 6–4

- It was Graf's 21st career Grand Slam title and her 5th and last US Open title.

=== Men's doubles ===
(Australia) Todd Woodbridge / (Australia) Mark Woodforde defeated (Netherlands) Jacco Eltingh / (Netherlands) Paul Haarhuis 4–6, 7–6^{(7–5)}, 7–6^{(7–2)}

- It was Woodbridge's 12th career Grand Slam title and his 4th US Open title. It was Woodforde's 13th career Grand Slam title and his 4th and last US Open title.

=== Women's doubles ===
(United States) Gigi Fernández / (Belarus) Natasha Zvereva defeated (Czech Republic) Jana Novotná / (Spain) Arantxa Sánchez Vicario 1–6, 6–1, 6–4

- It was Fernández's 15th career Grand Slam title and her 5th and last US Open title. It was Zvereva's 17th career Grand Slam title and her 4th and last US Open title.

=== Mixed doubles ===
(United States) Lisa Raymond / (United States) Patrick Galbraith defeated (Netherlands) Manon Bollegraf / (United States) Rick Leach 7–6^{(8–6)}, 7–6^{(7–4)}

- It was Raymond's 1st career Grand Slam title and her 1st US Open title. It was Galbraith's 2nd and last career Grand Slam title and his 2nd US Open title.

== Juniors ==
=== Boys' singles ===
(Germany) Daniel Elsner defeated (Austria) Markus Hipfl 6–3, 6–2

=== Girls' singles ===
(Croatia) Mirjana Lučić defeated (Germany) Marlene Weingärtner 6–2, 6–1

=== Boys' doubles ===
(United States) Bob Bryan / (United States) Mike Bryan defeated (Italy) Daniele Bracciali / (Canada) Jocelyn Robichaud 5–7, 6–3, 6–4

=== Girls' doubles ===
(South Africa) Surina de Beer / (South Africa) Jessica Steck defeated (Slovenia) Petra Rampre / (Slovenia) Katarina Srebotnik 6–4, 6–3

== Other events ==
=== Men's 35s doubles masters ===
(United States) Johan Kriek / (United Kingdom) John Lloyd defeated (India) Vijay Amritraj / (United States) Tim Wilkison 6–4, 6–4

=== Men's 45s doubles masters ===
(United States) Tom Gullikson / (United States) Dick Stockton defeated (United States) Bob Lutz / (United States) Stan Smith 6–4, 6–2

=== Women's doubles masters ===
(United Kingdom) Anne Hobbs / (United Kingdom) Virginia Wade defeated (United Kingdom) Jo Durie / (United States) Valerie Ziegenfuss 6–2, 6–2

=== Mixed doubles masters ===
(Australia) Wendy Turnbull / (Netherlands) Tom Okker vs. (United Kingdom) Jo Durie / (United States) Tom Gorman (abandoned due to rain)

Preceded by 1996 Wimbledon Championships	Grand Slams	Succeeded by 1997 Australian Open
