= Williams sisters rivalry =

Tennis singles rivalry between Venus and Serena Williams

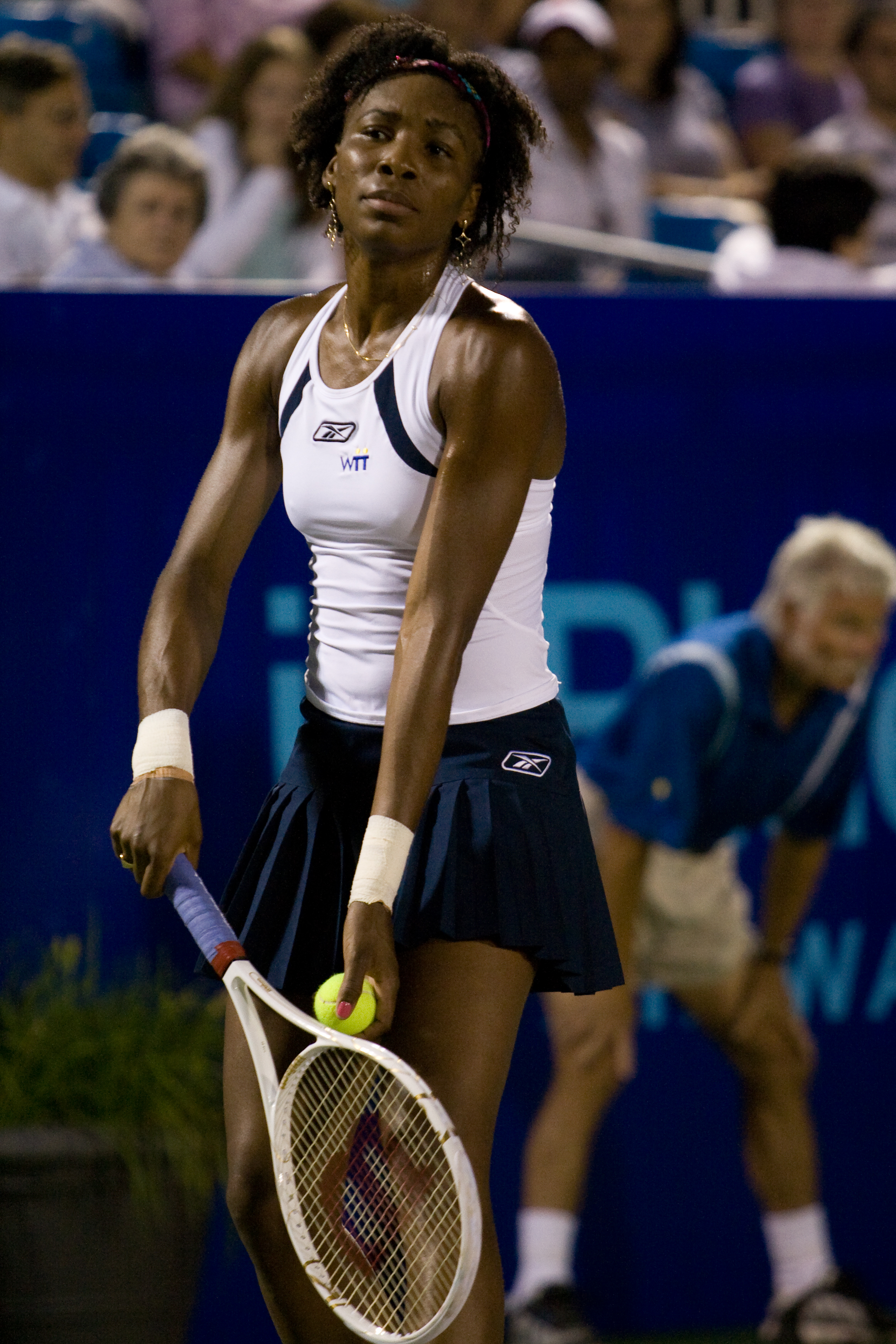
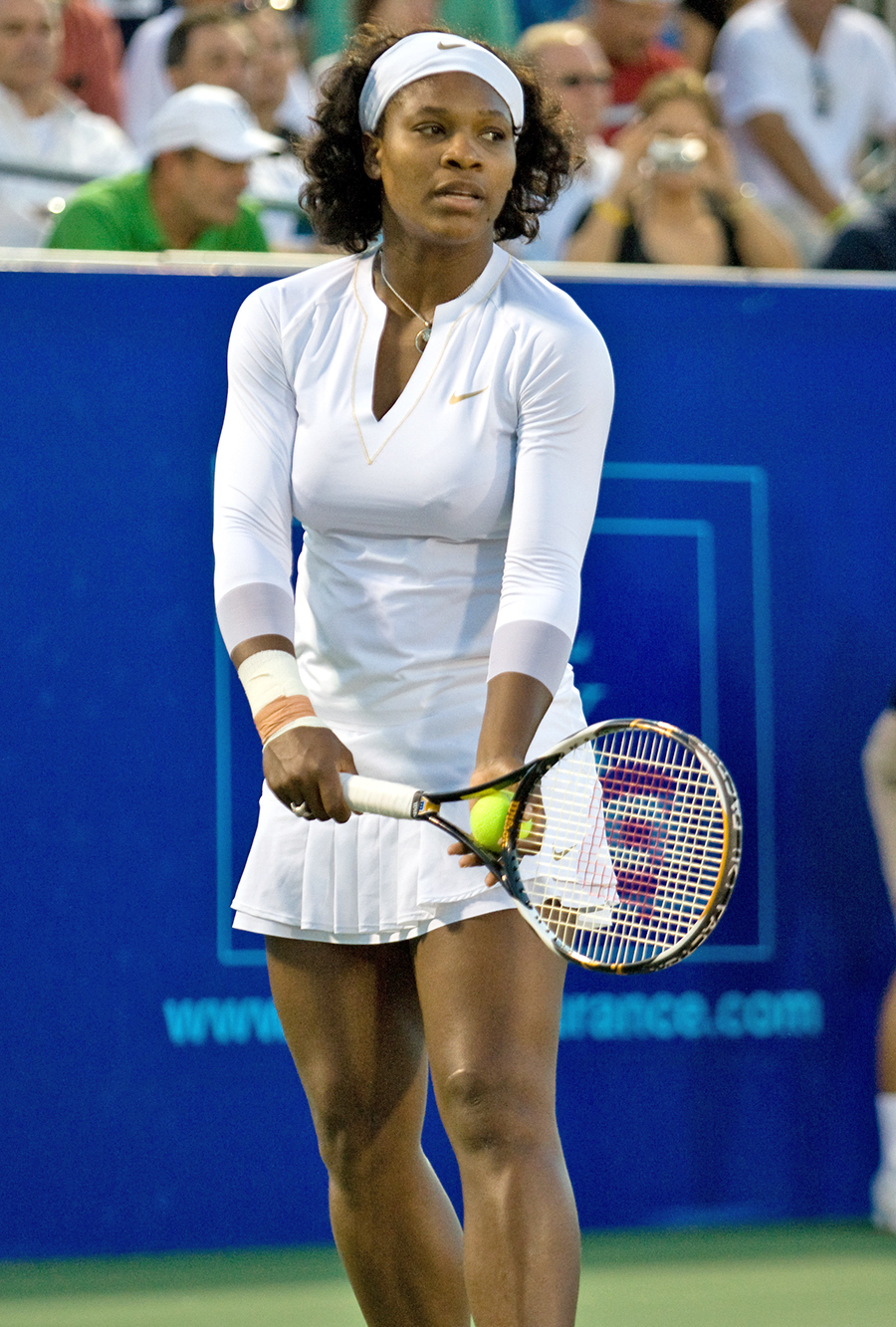
Venus Williams (left) and Serena Williams (right).

The Williams sisters rivalry was a tennis rivalry between sisters Venus Williams (born June 17, 1980) and Serena Williams (born September 26, 1981). They were coached by their father, Richard Williams, whose tennis knowledge came from reading books and watching professional matches. Venus and Serena are regarded as two of the greatest tennis players of all time. They met 31 times in professional tournaments between 1998 and 2020, with Serena leading their overall head-to-head 19–12, as well as 9–3 in finals, 11–5 at the majors, and 7–2 in major finals.

Both sisters have been ranked world No. 1 in singles: Venus for a total of 11 weeks, between 25 February 2002 and 7 July 2002. The next day, 8 July 2002, Serena would replace her sister at No. 1 and remain there for 57 consecutive weeks, until 10 August 2003. In all, Serena held the No. 1 ranking for a total of 319 weeks, joining Steffi Graf (377) and Martina Navratilova (332) as the only women to hold it for over 300 weeks. Venus has won 49 singles titles from 83 finals, and Serena won 73 titles from 98 finals, throughout their respective careers which spanned three decades.

The Williams sisters became the first two players in the Open Era, female or male, to contest four consecutive major finals: from the 2002 French Open to the 2003 Australian Open. Serena won all four of these finals. Serena and Venus remain the only women's pair to accomplish the feat, and did so at only 20 and 21 years old, respectively.

While the Williams sisters excelled at all four majors, their successes on the grass courts of Wimbledon were the greatest. One of Venus and Serena was in all but one Wimbledon singles finals in the 2000s, and they won eight of those finals. From 2000 to 2019, a span of 20 years, a Williams sister was in the singles final in all but four years. In the end, they would each have four runner-up finishes, and Venus would claim five Wimbledon crowns, while Serena owned seven, combining for 20 Wimbledon finals and a dozen Wimbledon trophies.

The sisters are nonetheless personally very close. Playing doubles together, they won 22 titles, including 14 majors from 14 finals, and three Olympic gold medals.

== History ==
=== 1998–2000 ===
Serena and Venus Williams played their first professional match against each other in the second round of the 1998 Australian Open. Venus won 7–6(4), 6–1. The match was described as "subpar". They played again in the quarterfinals of the Italian Open, the first clay court tournament of Serena's career, which Venus won 6–4, 6–2. Together they won two doubles titles.

Their next match was almost a year later in the final of the 1999 Lipton International Players Championships in Key Biscayne, Florida. Serena was coming off her first two tournament titles, but Venus won the match 6–1, 4–6, 6–4. The match was the first singles final between sisters on the WTA tour and was described by their father as a "bullfight". Serena won her first professional singles match against Venus later that year in the final of the Grand Slam Cup. Serena was coming off her first Grand Slam championship at the US Open and defeated her elder sister, and defending champion, 6–1, 3–6, 6–3. Venus was the only top player up to this point that Serena had not yet defeated. Together, they won three doubles titles, two of them being majors: the French Open and the U.S. Open.

Entering their next match in the semifinals of Wimbledon in 2000 (their first match against each other on grass), Serena was the favorite. However, the victory went to Venus 6–2, 7–6(3), who would go on to win the Wimbledon trophy for her first Grand Slam singles title. They teamed up to win the Wimbledon doubles title and later the Olympic gold medal. Venus's career advantage now stood at 4–1.

=== 2001 ===
They started out the year by winning the Australian Open doubles title.

In the spring at the Tennis Masters Series in Indian Wells, California, amid controversy Venus withdrew before her scheduled semifinal match against Serena. The Williams family was accused of match-fixing, but the accusation was dismissed by most, including Andre Agassi who called it "ridiculous". Serena won the final against Kim Clijsters amid boos, during both the match and the subsequent trophy presentation.

The only match between the Williams sisters during 2001 occurred in the final of the US Open, where they had never met but where both had previously won singles titles. This was the first final involving sisters at a Grand Slam tournament during the open era and the first since the Watson sisters played in the 1884 Wimbledon final. This match has been described as arguably "the most-anticipated tennis final in years". However, nerves seem to have played a factor in the match, which was won easily by Venus 6–2, 6–4. With the victory, Venus now led their rivalry 5–1 and in Grand Slam singles titles 4–1.

=== 2002 ===
Venus and Serena would play each other four times in 2002. In addition to being the most times they had met in a single year, this would also mark the first time that Serena would end the season with a leading head-to-head, 4–0.

Their first meeting of the year occurred in the semifinals at the NASDAQ-100 Open. Serena won the match 6–2, 6–2, only the second victory over her sister in her career and the first since 1999. Venus's loss was described as "listless" and it ended her streak of 22 consecutive matches and three consecutive titles at the event.

Their next meeting was their second in a Grand Slam final, and their second on clay courts. At Roland Garros Serena beat Venus in a "tight" match 7–5, 6–3. The Grand Slam was the first for Serena in three years, and it was the first final at the French Open ever played by sisters. By reaching the final, Venus and Serena assured themselves of moving up to first and second in the world rankings, respectively.

One month later, the Williams sisters again met in a Grand Slam final, at Wimbledon. Again, Serena was the victor 7–6(4), 6–3 and the win moved Serena past her sister to the top of the rankings. Venus still led 5–4 in their head-to-head and 4–3 in Grand Slams, but it was now Serena who was seen as the player "now setting the agenda for women's tennis". They won the doubles title together.

Their fourth and last match of the year occurred in the final at the US Open, in a match where the victor would take not only the trophy but the No.1 ranking as well. Serena won the match 6–4, 6–3 with a "blistering" display of tennis.

=== 2003 ===
2003 would be a year of injuries and loss for Venus and Serena Williams, with the two highlights being the Australian Open and Wimbledon finals.

The first match of 2003 contested between the Williams sisters was the first final between the two players at the Australian Open but the fourth consecutive at the majors. Serena won the match 7–6(4), 3–6, 6–4, the closest contested match between them since 1999. The win completed what has become popularly known as the "Serena Slam"; Serena Williams became the first player since Steffi Graf to hold all four Grand Slams at the same time. In addition Venus Williams became the first player since Martina Hingis in 1997 to make four consecutive Grand Slam finals, and the sisters together became the first players in the open era to contest four consecutive finals at the majors. Together they won the doubles title.

This consistent play at recent Grand Slams led some to remark that the Williams sisters had a stranglehold on women's tennis.

The Williams sisters next met in the 2003 Wimbledon final, a repeat of the 2002 final in the same tournament. Again the match was close but Serena, aided by an abdominal injury that negatively impacted Venus's speed, won 4–6, 6–4, 6–2. The win was the second consecutive at Wimbledon for Serena and her fifth out the last six. Additionally, the Williams sisters collectively had now won the last four Wimbledon titles and seven of the last nine Grand Slams. Serena Williams had now won their last six consecutive meetings, and led the head-to-head 7–5.

The Wimbledon final was the last Grand Slam final contested between the two for five years. Both sisters would be knocked off the tour by injuries, and then have to contend with the death of Yetunde Price, their half sister.

=== 2004–2005 ===
Venus and Serena Williams did not meet in a professional tennis match during 2004, a year which saw neither sister win a Grand Slam for the first time since 1998. 2005 would be a return to Grand Slam victory for both of the Williams sisters, but in perhaps a sign of the increased competition neither of their championships were decided against each other.

Their first match of 2005 was due in the quarterfinals of the NASDAQ-100 Open, their third career meeting at the tournament. The match was won by Venus Williams 6–1, 7–6(8); it was the first meeting outside of a final between the two in three years and was the first win by the elder Williams sister in four years.

The Williams sisters next met on one of the largest stages in tennis, the US Open, though much earlier in the tournament than they were accustomed to. Venus stood as the recent Wimbledon champion and, here, had three impressive rounds before now returning to the court opposite her sister. In the fourth round (their earliest meeting in a Grand Slam since the first at the 1998 Australian Open) Venus won 7–6(5), 6–2. Venus went on to lose in the quarterfinals 4–6, 7–5, 6–1 to eventual champion Kim Clijsters. This marked the first time since the 1998 Rome meeting that the winner of a Williams sisters match-up did not win the title.

At the close of the year, after the first year since 2000 in which Serena was unable to win a match against her older sister, Venus Williams had now tied the head-to-head 7–7.

=== 2008–2009 ===
The first meeting in 2008 between the sisters occurred at the Canara Bank Bangalore Open, their first meeting in a Tier II event. The only match between the sisters to end in a third-set tiebreak, both Venus and Serena were, according to commentator and former player Tracy Austin "busting a gut to win". The match end in a 6–3, 3–6, 7–6(4) victory for Serena.

Venus and Serena next met on a familiar stage, Wimbledon; the match was their fourth meeting on the grass courts and their third final. The match featured "big hitting and big serving" as well as "some wonderful defense and court coverage". Testament to the fact that this was arguably the best Williams sisters match to date, former player and commentator John McEnroe has called the match "borderline classic". Venus won the match 7–5, 6–4. They teamed up to win the doubles title and later a second Olympic Gold Medal together.

At the US Open, fourth seeded Serena defeated seventh seeded Venus in the quarterfinals 7–6(6), 7–6(7) and eventually won the tournament. Tennis Magazine proclaimed the match the best women's singles match of 2008. The final match-up of the year between the Williams sisters was during the round robin phase of the year-ending Sony Ericsson Championships, with Venus winning 5–7, 6–1, 6–0. This was the first 6–0 set in their matchups.

At the end of 2008, their career head-to-head record was tied 9–9.

The Williams' first match of year 2009 was at the Barclays Dubai Tennis Championships, where they met in the semifinals. In a match that was described as a "thriller" by CNN, Venus prevailed 6–1, 2–6, 7–6(3). Serena was dogged by a knee injury in the third set, but did not excuse herself because of this, and Venus said that the match had been worthy of a final. Simon Reed, writing for Eurosport, said that the rivalry had become "greater now than it ever has been" in the previous three or four matches, due to the increased emotional intensity that the matches appeared to stir up in the players, which he believed had been lacking in the earlier part of their careers. Venus and Serena next played in the semifinals of the Sony Ericsson Open in April. Serena won the match 6–4, 3–6, 6–3, temporarily secured her World No. 1 ranking, and tied their head-to-head record at ten wins apiece. The two reached the final of the 2009 Wimbledon Championships for both singles and doubles. Serena won the singles title for the first time in six years, beating Venus 7–6(3), 6–2. They met for the fourth time in the year during the round robin phase of the year-ending 2009 Sony Ericsson Championships, with Serena winning 5–7, 6–4, 7–6(4) saving match point. They met again in the final of the tournament with Serena winning again by a score of 6–2, 7–6(4). The head-to-head now stood at 13–10 in favor of Serena, who has also won the last four meetings.

=== 2013–2015 ===
Due to a mixture of injury and illness, the pair did not face each other again until the 2013 Family Circle Cup. It was their first matchup on clay since the 2002 French Open final. Serena won her fifth consecutive match against Venus. Venus and Serena's 25th encounter came in the semi-finals of the 2014 Rogers Cup. Serena went into the match with a five consecutive match winning streak against her older sister. However, Venus won the match 6(2)–7, 6–2, 6–3, making the sisters' head-to-head record at 14–11 in favor of Serena. Venus increased her Premier Mandatory/Premier 5 record against Serena to 5–2 and her semi-final record against her sister to 3–4.

After a period of six years, the pair met in the fourth round of Wimbledon in 2015 – their first meeting in a grand slam event since Wimbledon 2009. It was the pair's sixth meeting at Wimbledon. Serena won the match by a score of 6–4, 6–3, making the sisters' head-to-head record 15–11 in Serena's favor and 4–2 in Wimbledon again in favor of Serena. They met again in the quarterfinals of the US Open, where Serena won, taking the head-to-head to 16–11 in her favor.

=== 2017 ===
The sisters renewed their grand slam rivalry in the Australian Open final. Serena won her seventh Australian Open title, and 23rd Grand Slam title overall, defeating Venus 6–4, 6–4. The win also allowed Serena to pass Steffi Graf's 22 grand slam singles titles.

=== 2018 ===
Venus and Serena met twice during 2018. They met in the third round of the BNP Paribas Open (Indian Wells). Venus won the encounter 6–3, 6–4. They met for the second time in the year in the 3rd round of the US Open, with Serena winning 6–1, 6–2.

=== 2020 ===
Venus and Serena met in the second round of the 2020 Top Seed Open in Lexington, Kentucky. In their first tournament since the resumption of the WTA Tour during the COVID-19 pandemic, the sisters faced one another for the 31st and final time in their careers. The clash came more than 22 years after their first professional meeting. Serena entered the tournament as the top seed and defeated Venus 3–6, 6–3, 6–4.

== Analysis ==
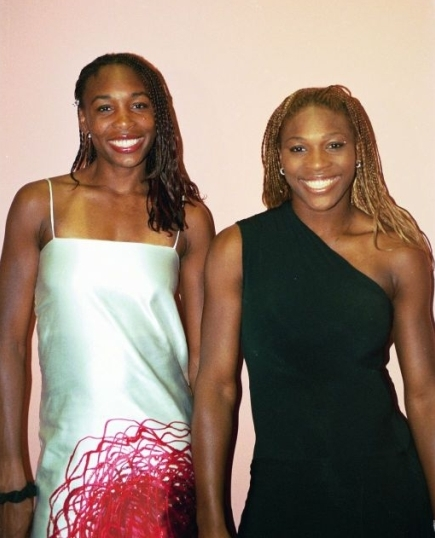
Williams sisters at a charity event in 2001

=== Relationship and competitive dynamic ===
The professional relationship and dynamic between Venus and Serena Williams is deeply affected by their close personal relationship. The notion of two top professionals emerging from the same family to compete against one another is unprecedented, and is a scenario which has been described as being "as improbable as one set of parents raising Picasso and Monet." After Serena's big wins over Venus' only finals at the 2003 Australian Open and the 2002 French Open, journalists said "Clearly Venus has a 'big sister complex' towards Serena". Peter Bodo, further speaking to the unlikeliness of siblings contesting Grand Slam finals, states "It's a common occurrence that will cease to be possible, perhaps ever again, the moment they set the sticks aside."

=== Legacy ===
The all-Williams final at the 2001 US Open drew a larger television audience than the Notre Dame-Nebraska college football game being broadcast at the same time. In fact, part of the reason that the women's final at the US Open was moved to its "prime time" spot was because of the positive effect that the Williams sisters had on television ratings. CBS's four highest-rated US Open women's finals of the last decade all involved the Williams sisters.

The Williams legacy can also arguably be seen in the increased representation of African Americans among tennis professionals and new players, though their representation among professionals still remains small. A third of all new players at the grass-roots level are either African American or Hispanic, a fact to which the USTA's president Jane Brown Grimes says, "I can't help but think that Venus and Serena are drivers behind that".

== List of all matches ==
WTA, Grand Slam, and Grand Slam Cup main draw results included.

Legend (1998–2008)	Legend (2009–2020)	Legend (2021–present)	Serena	Venus
Grand Slam			11	5
WTA Tour Championships (WTA Finals)			2	1
WTA Tier I	WTA Premier Mandatory	WTA 1000	2	6
WTA Tier I	WTA Premier 5	WTA 1000	2	6
WTA Tier II	WTA Premier	WTA 500	2	0
WTA Tier III	WTA International	WTA 250	1	0
WTA Tier IV	WTA International	WTA 250	1	0
WTA Tier V	WTA International	WTA 250	1	0
Grand Slam Cup	No Event		1	0
Total			19	12

=== Singles ===
Serena Williams–Venus Williams (19–12)

No.	Year	Tournament	Series	Surface	Round	Winner	Score	Length	Sets	Serena	Venus
1.	1998	Australian Open	Major	Hard	Round of 64	Venus	7–6^{(7–4)}, 6–1	1:26	2/3	0	1
2.	1998	Italian Open	Tier I	Clay	Quarterfinals	Venus	6–4, 6–2	1:11	2/3	0	2
3.	1999	Miami Open	Tier I	Hard	Final	Venus	6–1, 4–6, 6–4	1:58	3/3	0	3
4.	1999	Grand Slam Cup	GS Cup	Carpet (i)	Final	Serena	6–1, 3–6, 6–3	1:45	3/3	1	3
5.	2000	Wimbledon	Major	Grass	Semifinals	Venus	6–2, 7–6^{(7–3)}	1:26	2/3	1	4
—	2001	Indian Wells Masters	Tier I	Hard	Semifinals	Serena	Walkover			1	4
6.	2001	US Open	Major	Hard	Final	Venus	6–2, 6–4	1:09	2/3	1	5
7.	2002	Miami Open	Tier I	Hard	Semifinals	Serena	6–2, 6–2	0:49	2/3	2	5
8.	2002	Roland Garros	Major	Clay	Final	Serena	7–5, 6–3	1:31	2/3	3	5
9.	2002	Wimbledon	Major	Grass	Final	Serena	7–6^{(7–4)}, 6–3	1:18	2/3	4	5
10.	2002	US Open	Major	Hard	Final	Serena	6–4, 6–3	1:12	2/3	5	5
11.	2003	Australian Open	Major	Hard	Final	Serena	7–6^{(7–4)}, 3–6, 6–4	2:22	3/3	6	5
12.	2003	Wimbledon	Major	Grass	Final	Serena	4–6, 6–4, 6–2	2:04	3/3	7	5
13.	2005	Miami Open	Tier I	Hard	Quarterfinals	Venus	6–1, 7–6^{(10–8)}	1:44	2/3	7	6
14.	2005	US Open	Major	Hard	Round of 16	Venus	7–6^{(7–5)}, 6–2	1:28	2/3	7	7
15.	2008	Bangalore Open	Tier II	Hard	Semifinals	Serena	6–3, 3–6, 7–6^{(7–4)}	2:10	3/3	8	7
16.	2008	Wimbledon	Major	Grass	Final	Venus	7–5, 6–4	1:51	2/3	8	8
17.	2008	US Open	Major	Hard	Quarterfinals	Serena	7–6^{(8–6)}, 7–6^{(9–7)}	2:25	2/3	9	8
18.	2008	WTA Tour Championships	Tour Finals	Hard	Round Robin	Venus	5–7, 6–1, 6–0	1:48	3/3	9	9
19.	2009	Dubai Championships	Premier 5	Hard	Semifinals	Venus	6–1, 2–6, 7–6^{(7–3)}	2:02	3/3	9	10
20.	2009	Miami Open	Premier Mandatory	Hard	Semifinals	Serena	6–4, 3–6, 6–3	1:55	3/3	10	10
21.	2009	Wimbledon	Major	Grass	Final	Serena	7–6^{(7–3)}, 6–2	1:27	2/3	11	10
22.	2009	WTA Tour Championships	Tour Finals	Hard	Round Robin	Serena	5–7, 6–4, 7–6^{(7–4)}	2:41	3/3	12	10
23.	2009	WTA Tour Championships	Tour Finals	Hard	Final	Serena	6–2, 7–6^{(7–4)}	1:25	2/3	13	10
24.	2013	Charleston Open	Premier	Clay	Semifinals	Serena	6–1, 6–2	0:54	2/3	14	10
25.	2014	Canadian Open	Premier 5	Hard	Semifinals	Venus	6–7^{(2–7)}, 6–2, 6–3	2:01	3/3	14	11
26.	2015	Wimbledon	Major	Grass	Round of 16	Serena	6–4, 6–3	1:08	2/3	15	11
27.	2015	US Open	Major	Hard	Quarterfinals	Serena	6–2, 1–6, 6–3	1:38	3/3	16	11
28.	2017	Australian Open	Major	Hard	Final	Serena	6–4, 6–4	1:21	2/3	17	11
29.	2018	Indian Wells Masters	Premier Mandatory	Hard	Round of 32	Venus	6–3, 6–4	1:26	2/3	17	12
30.	2018	US Open	Major	Hard	Round of 32	Serena	6–1, 6–2	1:12	2/3	18	12
—	2019	Italian Open	Premier 5	Clay	Round of 32	Venus	Walkover			18	12
31.	2020	Top Seed Open	International	Hard	Round of 16	Serena	3–6, 6–3, 6–4	2:21	3/3	19	12

=== Breakdown of the rivalry ===
- Hard courts: Serena 12–9
- Clay courts: Serena, 2–1
- Grass courts: Serena, 4–2
- Carpet: Serena, 1–0
- Grand Slam matches: Serena, 11–5
- Grand Slam finals: Serena, 7–2
- Year-End Championships matches: Serena, 2–1
- Year-End Championships finals: Serena, 1–0
- All finals: Serena, 9–3

=== Mixed doubles ===
Serena Williams—Venus Williams (0–1)

No.	Year	Tournament	Series	Surface	Round	Winner	Score	Opponents	Serena	Venus
1.	1998	Roland Garros	Major	Clay	Final	Venus/Justin Gimelstob	6–4, 6–4	Serena/Luis Lobo	0	1

== Exhibitions ==
=== Singles ===
Serena Williams–Venus Williams (5–12)

No.	Year	Tournament Name	Tournament Location	Surface	Round	Winner	Score
1.	2001	J.P. Morgan Chase Tennis Challenge	Delray Beach, Florida, U.S.	Hard	–	Serena	7–6^{(7–4)}, 6–4
2.	2004	McDonald's Williams Sisters Tour	Chicago, Illinois, U.S.	Hard (i)	Round Robin	Venus	6–3, 6–4
3.	2004	McDonald's Williams Sisters Tour	Detroit, Michigan, U.S.	Hard (i)	Round Robin	Venus	6–4, 7–5
4.	2004	McDonald's Williams Sisters Tour	Atlanta, Georgia, U.S.	Hard (i)	Round Robin	Venus	6–3, 2–6, 6–3
5.	2005	McDonald's Williams Sisters Tour	Seattle, Washington, U.S.	Hard (i)	Round Robin	Serena	6–4, 6–3
6.	2005	McDonald's Williams Sisters Tour	Cleveland, Ohio, U.S.	Hard (i)	Round Robin	Venus	6–4, 6–4
7.	2005	McDonald's Williams Sisters Tour	Washington, D.C., U.S.	Hard (i)	Round Robin	Venus	6–3, 6–4
8.	2006	McDonald's Williams Sisters Tour	Denver, Colorado, U.S.	Hard (i)	Round Robin	Serena	7–5, 6–3
9.	2006	McDonald's Williams Sisters Tour	New Orleans, Louisiana, U.S.	Hard (i)	Round Robin	Venus	5–7, 6–4, 10–6
10.	2006	McDonald's Williams Sisters Tour	Charlotte, North Carolina, U.S.	Hard (i)	Round Robin	Venus	6–3, 6–4
11.	2009	Billie Jean King Cup	Madison Square Garden, New York City, New York, U.S.	Hard (i)	Final	Serena	6–4, 6–3
12.	2011	Master Comcel Venus vs. Serena Williams	Medellín, Colombia	Clay	–	Venus	6–4, 7–6^{(7–5)}
13.	2012	Breaking The Mould	Lagos, Nigeria	Hard	–	Venus	6–4, 7–5
14.	2012	Breaking The Mould	Johannesburg, South Africa	Hard (i)	–	Serena	6–3, 6–4
15.	2013	Copa Ciudad de Buenos Aires	Buenos Aires, Argentina	Clay	–	Venus	7–6^{(8–6)}, 6–2
16.	2018	Greenbrier Champions Tennis Classic	White Sulphur Springs, West Virginia, U.S.	Hard (i)	–	Venus	6–3, 2–6, 10–8
17.	2018	Mubadala World Tennis Championship	Abu Dhabi, United Arab Emirates	Hard	–	Venus	4–6, 6–3, 10–8

=== Doubles ===
Serena Williams–Venus Williams (2–2)

No.	Year	Tournament Name	Tournament Location	Surface	Round	Winners	Score	Opponents
1.	1999	Super Power Challenge Cup	Hong Kong	Hard	Semifinal	Serena/Li Fang	7–6^{(7–2)}, 3–6, 6–3	Venus/Lillian Lin Ning
2.	2002	JP Morgan Tennis Challenge	Delray Beach, Florida, U.S.	Hard	–	Venus/Alexandra Stevenson	8–4	Serena/Lori McNeil
3.	2003	JP Morgan Tennis Challenge	Naples, Florida, U.S.	Hard	–	Serena/Jana Novotná	8–7^{(8–6)}	Venus/Brenda Schultz-McCarthy
4.	2004	Lexus Tennis Challenge	Lexington, Kentucky, U.S.	Hard	–	Venus/Brenda Schultz-McCarthy	6–3	Serena/Anna Kournikova

== Grand Slam performance timeline ==
=== Head-to-head ===
Serena
Venus
- Final matches indicated in **bold**.

Tournament	1998	1999	2000	2001	2002	2003	2004	2005	2006	2007	2008	2009	2010	2011	2012	2013	2014	2015	2016	2017	2018
Australian Open	VW					**SW**														**SW**	
French Open					**SW**																
Wimbledon			VW		**SW**	**SW**					**VW**	**SW**						SW			
US Open				**VW**	**SW**			VW			SW							SW			SW

=== Combined singles performance timeline (best result) ===
Key
**W**	F	SF	QF	#R	RR	Q#	DNQ	A	NH

(W) winner; (F) finalist; (SF) semifinalist; (QF) quarterfinalist; (#R) rounds 4, 3, 2, 1; (RR) round-robin stage; (Q#) qualification round; (DNQ) did not qualify; (A) absent; (NH) not held; (SR) strike rate (events won / competed); (W–L) win–loss record.
To avoid confusion and double counting, these charts are updated at the conclusion of a tournament or when the player's participation has ended.

**W**

(W) Won tournament: final contested by the Williams sisters.

Tournament	1997	1998	1999	2000	2001	2002	2003	2004	2005	2006	2007	2008	2009	2010	2011	2012	2013	2014	2015	2016	2017	2018	2019	2020	2021	2022	2023	2024	2025	2026	SR
Australian Open	A	QF^{V}	QF^{V}	4R^{S}	SF^{V}	QF^{V}	**W^{S}**	3R^{V}	**W^{S}**	3R^{S}	**W^{S}**	QF^{SV}	**W^{S}**	**W^{S}**	3R^{V}	4R^{S}	QF^{S}	4R^{S}	**W^{S}**	F^{S}	**W^{S}**	1R^{V}	QF^{S}	3R^{S}	SF^{S}	A	A	A	A	1R^{V}	7 / 25
French Open	2R^{V}	QF^{V}	4R^{V}	QF^{V}	QF^{S}	**W^{S}**	SF^{S}	QF^{SV}	3R^{V}	QF^{V}	QF^{S}	3R^{SV}	QF^{S}	QF^{S}	A	2R^{V}	**W^{S}**	2R^{SV}	**W^{S}**	F^{S}	4R^{V}	4R^{S}	3R^{S}	2R^{S}	4R^{S}	A	A	A	A	A	3 / 23
Wimbledon	1R^{V}	QF^{V}	QF^{V}	**W^{V}**	**W^{V}**	**W^{S}**	**W^{S}**	F^{S}	**W^{V}**	3R^{V}	**W^{V}**	**W^{V}**	**W^{S}**	**W^{S}**	4R^{SV}	**W^{S}**	4R^{S}	3R^{SV}	**W^{S}**	**W^{S}**	F^{V}	F^{S}	F^{S}	NH	2R^{V}	1R^{S}	1R^{V}	A	A	1R^{S}	12 / 27
US Open	F^{V}	SF^{V}	**W^{S}**	**W^{V}**	**W^{V}**	**W^{S}**	A	QF^{S}	QF^{V}	4R^{S}	SF^{V}	**W^{S}**	SF^{S}	SF^{V}	F^{S}	**W^{S}**	**W^{S}**	**W^{S}**	SF^{S}	SF^{S}	SF^{V}	F^{S}	F^{S}	SF^{S}	A	3R^{S}	1R^{V}	A	1R^{V}		8 / 25

== Year-end WTA ranking timeline ==
Player	1995	1996	1997	1998	1999	2000	2001	2002	2003	2004	2005	2006	2007	2008	2009	2010	2011	2012	2013	2014	2015	2016	2017	2018	2019	2020	2021	2022	2023	2024	2025
Venus	205	216	22	5	3	3	3	2	11	9	10	46	8	6	6	5	102	24	49	18	7	17	5	40	53	78	318	1010	407	970	572
Serena			99	20	4	6	6	1	3	7	11	95	7	2	1	4	12	3	1	1	1	2	22	16	10	11	41				

== See also ==
- List of tennis rivalries
- Williams sisters
- Henin–S. Williams rivalry
