= Renee Reid =

Australian tennis player

- Country (sports): Australia
- Born: 28 May 1978 (age 46)
- Prize money: $34,359

Singles
- Highest ranking: No. 174 (22 September 1997)

Grand Slam singles results
- Australian Open: 1R (1998)

Doubles
- Highest ranking: No. 150 (1 December 1997)

Grand Slam doubles results
- Australian Open: 1R (1998)

Renee Reid (born 28 May 1978) is a former professional tennis player from Australia.

== Biography ==
Reid, who grew up in Sydney, was a product of the Australian Institute of Sport and played on the professional tour in the late 1990s, with a best ranking of 174 in the world.

Reid competed in Australian Open qualifying for the first time in 1996, where she had a win over Patty Schnyder, before falling in the second round. In 1997 she lost to Amélie Mauresmo in qualifying, then in 1998 received a wildcard into the main draw. In what would be her only main draw appearance, Reid was beaten in the opening round by Elena Likhovtseva. She also completed in the women's doubles with Samantha Smith.

She is the elder sister of tennis player Todd Reid.

== ITF Circuit finals ==
=== Singles (2–3) ===
$25,000 tournaments
$10,000 tournaments

Result	No.	Date	Tournament	Surface	Opponent	Score
Loss	1.	15 December 1996	São Paulo, Brazil	Clay	(Argentina) Laura Montalvo	2–6, 7–5, 2–6
Loss	2.	11 May 1997	Maryborough, Australia	Hard	(Australia) Cindy Watson	4–6, 2–6
Loss	3.	18 May 1997	Caboolture, Australia	Hard	(Japan) Shinobu Asagoe	4–6, 1–6
Win	1.	25 May 1997	Gympie, Australia	Hard	(Japan) Shinobu Asagoe	3–6, 6–3, 6–4
Win	2.	8 June 1997	Ipswich, Australia	Hard	(Japan) Shinobu Asagoe	6–1, 6–3

=== Doubles (1–5) ===
Result	No.	Date	Tournament	Surface	Partner	Opponents	Score
Loss	1.	26 April 1997	Dalby, Australia	Hard	(Australia) Jenny-Ann Fetch	(South Africa) Nannie de Villiers (Australia) Lisa McShea	0–6, 3–6
Loss	2.	3 May 1997	Kooralbyn, Australia	Hard	(Australia) Jenny-Ann Fetch	(South Africa) Nannie de Villiers (Australia) Lisa McShea	7–6^{(4)}, 1–6, 3–6
Loss	3.	10 May 1997	Hope Island, Australia	Hard	(Australia) Jenny-Ann Fetch	(South Africa) Nannie de Villiers (Australia) Lisa McShea	4–6, 4–6
Loss	4.	27 July 1997	Rostock, Germany	Clay	(Hungary) Réka Vidáts	(Bulgaria) Svetlana Krivencheva (Bulgaria) Pavlina Nola	w/o
Win	1.	3 August 1997	Horb, Germany	Clay	(Germany) Julia Abe	(Romania) Magda Mihalache (Romania) Alice Pirsu	6–3, 6–3
Loss	5.	10 November 1997	Mount Gambier, Australia	Hard	(Hungary) Réka Vidáts	(Australia) Catherine Barclay (South Korea) Kim Eun-ha	3–6, 2–6
