= 1998 Australian Open – Women's doubles =

Tennis tournament

Women's doubles
- 1998 Australian Open

Final
- Champions: (Switzerland) Martina Hingis (Croatia) Mirjana Lučić
- Runners-up: (United States) Lindsay Davenport (Belarus) Natasha Zvereva
- Score: 6–4, 2–6, 6–3

Details
- Draw: 64
- Seeds: 16

Events
Singles	men	women		boys	girls
Doubles	men	women	mixed	boys	girls
WC Singles	men	women	quad
WC Doubles	men	women	quad
Legends	men	women	mixed
- Australian Open

Defending champion Martina Hingis and her partner Mirjana Lučić defeated the other defending champion Natasha Zvereva and her partner Lindsay Davenport in the final, 6–4, 2–6, 6–3 to win the women's doubles tennis title at the 1998 Australian Open. It was the first step in an eventual Grand Slam for Hingis.

== Seeds ==
Champion seeds are indicated in bold text while text in italics indicates the round in which those seeds were eliminated.

1. (United States) Lindsay Davenport / (Belarus) Natasha Zvereva (final)
2. (Netherlands) Manon Bollegraf / (Spain) Arantxa Sánchez Vicario (quarterfinals)
3. (Indonesia) Yayuk Basuki / (Netherlands) Caroline Vis (third round)
4. (Spain) Conchita Martínez / (Argentina) Patricia Tarabini (semifinals)
5. (United States) Chanda Rubin / (Czech Republic) Helena Suková (first round)
6. (Russia) Elena Likhovtseva / (Japan) Ai Sugiyama (quarterfinals)
7. (Japan) Naoko Kijimuta / (Japan) Nana Miyagi (quarterfinals)
8. (United States) Lisa Raymond / (Australia) Rennae Stubbs (semifinals)
9. (Russia) Anna Kournikova / (Latvia) Larisa Neiland (second round)
10. (Romania) Ruxandra Dragomir / (Croatia) Iva Majoli (third round)
11. (South Africa) Amanda Coetzer / (Germany) Anke Huber (third round)
12. (Belgium) Sabine Appelmans / (Netherlands) Miriam Oremans (third round)
13. (Argentina) Inés Gorrochategui / (Romania) Irina Spîrlea (first round)
14. (Japan) Rika Hiraki / (Argentina) Mercedes Paz (second round)
15. (Australia) Kerry-Anne Guse / (Australia) Rachel McQuillan (quarterfinals)
16. (Czech Republic) Eva Melicharová / (Czech Republic) Helena Vildová (first round)

== Draw ==
Key

- Q = Qualifier
- WC = Wild card
- LL = Lucky loser
- Alt = Alternate
- ITF = ITF entry
- PR = Protected ranking
- SR = Special ranking
- SE = Special exempt
- JE = Junior exempt
- JR = Junior Accelerator Programme entrant
- CO = College Accelerator Programme entrant
- NG = Next Gen Accelerator Program entrant
- w/o = Walkover
- r = Retired
- d = Defaulted

=== Finals ===
Quarterfinals
1	(United States) Lindsay Davenport (Belarus) Natasha Zvereva	6	6
7	(Japan) Naoko Kijimuta (Japan) Nana Miyagi	1	0
4	(Spain) Conchita Martínez (Argentina) Patricia Tarabini	6	6^{1}	6
6	(Russia) Elena Likhovtseva (Japan) Ai Sugiyama	4	7	1
8	(United States) Lisa Raymond (Australia) Rennae Stubbs	6	3	6
15	(Australia) Kerry-Anne Guse (Australia) Rachel McQuillan	4	6	3
WC	(Switzerland) Martina Hingis (Croatia) Mirjana Lučić	6	6
2	(Netherlands) Manon Bollegraf (Spain) Arantxa Sánchez Vicario	1	1

Semifinals
1	(United States) Lindsay Davenport (Belarus) Natasha Zvereva	6	6
4	(Spain) Conchita Martínez (Argentina) Patricia Tarabini	3	1
8	(United States) Lisa Raymond (Australia) Rennae Stubbs	6	4	1
WC	(Switzerland) Martina Hingis (Croatia) Mirjana Lučić	4	6	6

Final
1	(United States) Lindsay Davenport (Belarus) Natasha Zvereva	4	6	3
WC	(Switzerland) Martina Hingis (Croatia) Mirjana Lučić	6	2	6

=== Top half ===
==== Section 1 ====
First round
1	(United States) L Davenport (Belarus) N Zvereva	6	6
(Hungary) V Csurgo (Hungary) K Marosi	2	2
(Poland) M Grzybowska (Slovakia) H Nagyová	6	1
(Georgia (country)) N Louarsabishvili (Ukraine) O Lugina	1	0R
(France) A Dechaume-Balleret (France) S Testud	3	6	9
(Germany) M Babel (Australia) C Barclay	6	0	7
10	(Romania) R Dragomir (Croatia) I Majoli	6	6
(Germany) W Probst (France) A-G Sidot	4	3
14	(Japan) R Hiraki (Argentina) M Paz	6	6
(Austria) K Kschwendt (Italy) F Perfetti	4	4
(United States) S Williams (United States) V Williams	6	6
(United States) E deLone (South Africa) L Horn	4	2
(Japan) S Asagoe (New Zealand) P Nola	7	7
(France) L Ghirardi (Italy) G Pizzichini	6^{5}	6^{1}
7	(Japan) N Kijimuta (Japan) N Miyagi	6	6
(Czech Republic) E Martincová (Czech Republic) L Němečková	4	0

Second round
1	(United States) L Davenport (Belarus) N Zvereva	6	1	6
(Poland) M Grzybowska (Slovakia) H Nagyová	2	6	1
(France) A Dechaume-Balleret (France) S Testud	5	4
10	(Romania) R Dragomir (Croatia) I Majoli	7	6
14	(Japan) R Hiraki (Argentina) M Paz	6	2	2
(United States) S Williams (United States) V Williams	2	6	6
(Japan) S Asagoe (New Zealand) P Nola	2	2
7	(Japan) N Kijimuta (Japan) N Miyagi	6	6

Third round
1	(United States) L Davenport (Belarus) N Zvereva	6	6
10	(Romania) R Dragomir (Croatia) I Majoli	1	1
(United States) S Williams (United States) V Williams	3	3
7	(Japan) N Kijimuta (Japan) N Miyagi	6	6

Quarterfinals
1	(United States) L Davenport (Belarus) N Zvereva	6	6
7	(Japan) N Kijimuta (Japan) N Miyagi	1	0

==== Section 2 ====
First round
4	(Spain) C Martínez (Argentina) P Tarabini	3	6	6
(South Africa) M de Swardt (Italy) R Grande	6	3	4
(Switzerland) P Schnyder (Netherlands) B Schultz	6	6
(Canada) S Jeyaseelan (Canada) R Simpson	2	4
(Australia) K Kunce (United States) C Morariu	6	7
(Sweden) Å Carlsson (Canada) P Hy-Boulais	3	6^{6}
11	(South Africa) A Coetzer (Germany) A Huber	6	4	6
(United States) K Adams (United States) M McGrath	2	6	0
(South Africa) N de Villiers (Australia) L McShea	6^{4}	6	6
16	(Czech Republic) E Melicharová (Czech Republic) H Vildová	7	2	1
(United States) S Reeves (United States) M Tu	6	6
WC	(Australia) E Dominikovic (Australia) S Drake-Brockman	3	3
(Romania) C Cristea (United States) A Wunderlich	7	7
(Belgium) E Callens (Belgium) L Courtois	6^{3}	5
6	(Russia) E Lichovceva (Japan) A Sugiyama	6	6
(Slovakia) J Husárová (Thailand) T Tanasugarn	1	3

Second round
4	(Spain) C Martínez (Argentina) P Tarabini	7	6
(Switzerland) P Schnyder (Netherlands) B Schultz	6^{4}	3
(Australia) K Kunce (United States) C Morariu	1	0
11	(South Africa) A Coetzer (Germany) A Huber	6	6
(South Africa) N de Villiers (Australia) L McShea	4	0
(United States) S Reeves (United States) M Tu	6	6
(Romania) C Cristea (United States) A Wunderlich	2	5
6	(Russia) E Lichovceva (Japan) A Sugiyama	6	7

Third round
4	(Spain) C Martínez (Argentina) P Tarabini	7	7
11	(South Africa) A Coetzer (Germany) A Huber	5	5
(United States) S Reeves (United States) M Tu	4	2
6	(Russia) E Lichovceva (Japan) A Sugiyama	6	6

Quarterfinals
4	(Spain) C Martínez (Argentina) P Tarabini	6	6^{1}	6
6	(Russia) E Lichovceva (Japan) A Sugiyama	4	7	1

=== Bottom half ===
==== Section 3 ====
First round
8	(United States) L Raymond (Australia) R Stubbs	6	6
WC	(Australia) G Biggs (Australia) A Grahame	2	1
(South Korea) E-h Kim (Germany) C Schneider	7	6
(Czech Republic) E Bobková (Czechoslovakia) P Langrová	5	3
(Netherlands) S Noorlander (France) N van Lottum	7	6
(France) N Dechy (India) N Vaidyanathan	6^{2}	2
(South Korea) S-h Park (Chinese Taipei) S-t Wang	6	6
13	(Argentina) I Gorrochategui (Romania) I Spîrlea	4	3
15	(Australia) K-A Guse (Australia) R McQuillan	6	2
(Argentina) M Díaz Oliva (Germany) S Klösel	3	0R
(Italy) L Golarsa (Belgium) D Van Roost	6	6
(Australia) D Jones (Poland) A Olsza	4	1
(Germany) B Rittner (Bulgaria) E Pampoulova	7	6
(Belarus) O Barabanschikova (Australia) L Pleming	5	4
WC	(Australia) A Molik (Australia) B Stewart	2	4
3	(Indonesia) Y Basuki (Netherlands) C Vis	6	6

Second round
8	(United States) L Raymond (Australia) R Stubbs	6	6
(South Korea) E-h Kim (Germany) C Schneider	1	0
(Netherlands) S Noorlander (France) N van Lottum	3	3
(South Korea) S-h Park (Chinese Taipei) S-t Wang	6	6
15	(Australia) K-A Guse (Australia) R McQuillan	6	7
(Italy) L Golarsa (Belgium) D Van Roost	1	5
(Germany) B Rittner (Bulgaria) E Pampoulova	2	4
3	(Indonesia) Y Basuki (Netherlands) C Vis	6	6

Third round
8	(United States) L Raymond (Australia) R Stubbs	6	6
(South Korea) S-h Park (Chinese Taipei) S-t Wang	1	2
15	(Australia) K-A Guse (Australia) R McQuillan	6	3
3	(Indonesia) Y Basuki (Netherlands) C Vis	3	0R

Quarterfinals
8	(United States) L Raymond (Australia) R Stubbs	6	3	6
15	(Australia) K-A Guse (Australia) R McQuillan	4	6	3

==== Section 4 ====
First round
(Australia) T Musgrave (United Kingdom) J Pullin	4	6	6
5	(United States) C Rubin (Czech Republic) H Suková	6	1	4
(Bulgaria) S Krivencheva (Ukraine) O Tatarkova	6	6
(Australia) R Reid (United Kingdom) S Smith	1	2
WC	(Switzerland) M Hingis (Croatia) M Lučić	6	6
(Japan) M Saeki (Japan) Y Yoshida	2	3
9	(Russia) A Kournikova (Latvia) L Neiland	6	6
(Slovakia) K Habšudová (Argentina) F Labat	2	1
12	(Belgium) S Appelmans (Netherlands) M Oremans	6	6
(Australia) A Ellwood (Australia) N Pratt	2	2
(Chinese Taipei) J Lee (United States) L Lee-Waters	6	6
(France) C Dhenin (United Kingdom) C Wood	3	3
(Spain) V Ruano Pascual (Argentina) P Suárez	6	5	7
(Italy) S Farina (Austria) B Schett	4	7	5
2	(Netherlands) M Bollegraf (Spain) A Sánchez Vicario	3	6	6
(United States) G Helgeson-Nielsen (Slovenia) T Križan	6	3	3

Second round
(Australia) T Musgrave (United Kingdom) J Pullin	6^{1}	4
(Bulgaria) S Krivencheva (Ukraine) O Tatarkova	7	6
WC	(Switzerland) M Hingis (Croatia) M Lučić	7	6
9	(Russia) A Kournikova (Latvia) L Neiland	5	2
12	(Belgium) S Appelmans (Netherlands) M Oremans	6	1	6
(Chinese Taipei) J Lee (United States) L Lee-Waters	3	6	3
(Spain) V Ruano Pascual (Argentina) Paola Suárez	1	1
2	(Netherlands) M Bollegraf (Spain) A Sánchez Vicario	6	6

Third round
(Bulgaria) S Krivencheva (Ukraine) O Tatarkova	1	3
WC	(Switzerland) M Hingis (Croatia) M Lučić	6	6
12	(Belgium) S Appelmans (Netherlands) M Oremans	6	5	2
2	(Netherlands) M Bollegraf (Spain) A Sánchez Vicario	3	7	6

Quarterfinals
WC	(Switzerland) M Hingis (Croatia) M Lučić	6	6
2	(Netherlands) M Bollegraf (Spain) A Sánchez Vicario	1	1
