= 1998 Australian Open – Women's singles =

Women's singles
- 1998 Australian Open

Final
- Champion: (Switzerland) Martina Hingis
- Runner-up: (Spain) Conchita Martínez
- Score: 6–3, 6–3

Details
- Draw: 128
- Seeds: 16

Events
Singles	men	women		boys	girls
Doubles	men	women	mixed	boys	girls
WC Singles	men	women	quad
WC Doubles	men	women	quad
Legends	men	women	mixed
- Australian Open

Defending champion Martina Hingis defeated Conchita Martínez in the final, 6–3, 6–3 to win the women's singles tennis title at the 1998 Australian Open. It was her second Australian Open title and fourth major singles title overall.

This was the first major in which future world No. 1, Olympic gold medalist, and 23-time major singles champion, and 7-time Australian Open singles champion Serena Williams competed in the main draw. She was defeated by her sister Venus in the second round.

Nirupama Vaidyanathan became the first Indian woman in the Open Era to contest, and win, a main draw singles match at a major.

== Seeds ==
1. (Switzerland) Martina Hingis (champion)
2. (United States) Lindsay Davenport (semifinals)
3. (South Africa) Amanda Coetzer (fourth round)
4. (Croatia) Iva Majoli (third round)
5. (France) Mary Pierce (quarterfinals)
6. (Romania) Irina Spîrlea (first round)
7. (Spain) Arantxa Sánchez Vicario (quarterfinals)
8. (Spain) Conchita Martínez (final)
9. (France) Sandrine Testud (quarterfinals)
10. (Germany) Anke Huber (semifinals)
11. (Netherlands) Brenda Schultz-McCarthy (second round)
12. (Belgium) Sabine Appelmans (first round)
13. (United States) Lisa Raymond (third round)
14. (Belgium) Dominique Van Roost (third round)
15. (Romania) Ruxandra Dragomir (fourth round)
16. (Japan) Ai Sugiyama (fourth round)

== Draw ==
Key

- Q = Qualifier
- WC = Wild card
- LL = Lucky loser
- Alt = Alternate
- ITF = ITF entry
- PR = Protected ranking
- SR = Special ranking
- SE = Special exempt
- JE = Junior exempt
- JR = Junior Accelerator Programme entrant
- CO = College Accelerator Programme entrant
- NG = Next Gen Accelerator Program entrant
- w/o = Walkover
- r = Retired
- d = Defaulted

=== Finals ===
Quarterfinals
1	(Switzerland) Martina Hingis	6	6
5	(France) Mary Pierce	2	3
10	(Germany) Anke Huber	7^{9}	7
7	(Spain) Arantxa Sánchez Vicario	6^{7}	5
8	(Spain) Conchita Martínez	6	6
9	(France) Sandrine Testud	3	2
(United States) Venus Williams	6	5	3
2	(United States) Lindsay Davenport	1	7	6

Semifinals
1	(Switzerland) Martina Hingis	6	2	6
10	(Germany) Anke Huber	1	6	1
8	(Spain) Conchita Martínez	4	6	6
2	(United States) Lindsay Davenport	6	3	3

Final
1	(Switzerland) Martina Hingis	6	6
8	(Spain) Conchita Martínez	3	3

=== Top half ===
==== Section 1 ====
First round
1	(Switzerland) M Hingis	6	6
(Germany) W Probst	1	2
(Germany) B Rittner	6	7^{7}
Q	(Ukraine) E Tatarkova	1	6^{5}
(Belgium) E Callens	4	6	3
(United States) C Morariu	6	1	6
(Russia) A Kournikova	6	6
(Slovakia) K Studeníková	2	1
(Indonesia) Y Basuki	6^{4}	6	6
(United States) M Tu	7^{7}	3	1
(Netherlands) K Boogert	6	6
Q	(Czech Republic) R Bobková	3	2
(Canada) P Hy-Boulais	6^{5}	4
(United States) T Snyder	7^{7}	6
(Canada) R Simpson	3	2
14	(Belgium) D Van Roost	6	6

Second round
1	(Switzerland) M Hingis	7	6
(Germany) B Rittner	5	1
(United States) C Morariu	5	2
(Russia) A Kournikova	7	6
(Indonesia) Y Basuki	5	6	6
(Netherlands) K Boogert	7	4	3
(United States) T Snyder	3	4
14	(Belgium) D Van Roost	6	6

Third round
1	(Switzerland) M Hingis	6	4	6
(Russia) A Kournikova	4	6	4
(Indonesia) Y Basuki	6	6
14	(Belgium) D Van Roost	4	4

Fourth round
1	(Switzerland) M Hingis	6	6
(Indonesia) Y Basuki	0	0

==== Section 2 ====
First round
11	(Netherlands) B Schultz-McCarthy	7^{8}	7
(Austria) M Maruska	6^{6}	5
(Slovakia) H Nagyová	6	6
(United States) A Wunderlich	3	1
PR	(United States) M McGrath	1	3
(Japan) Y Yoshida	6	6
WC	(Australia) R Reid	2	1
(Russia) E Likhovtseva	6	6
Q	(Canada) J Nejedly	6	6
(United States) C Rubin	2	4
(Belarus) O Barabanschikova	6	6
(Czech Republic) D Chládková	3	3
(Spain) C Torrens Valero	6	6
(Ukraine) O Lugina	4	4
(China) F Li	0	0
5	(France) M Pierce	6	6

Second round
11	(Netherlands) B Schultz-McCarthy	1	4
(Slovakia) H Nagyová	6	6
(Japan) Y Yoshida	4	6	1
(Russia) E Likhovtseva	6	4	6
Q	(Canada) J Nejedly	2	4
(Belarus) O Barabanschikova	6	6
(Spain) C Torrens Valero	1	2
5	(France) M Pierce	6	6

Third round
(Slovakia) H Nagyová	6^{1}	7	6
(Russia) E Likhovtseva	7^{7}	5	2
(Belarus) O Barabanschikova	5	3
5	(France) M Pierce	7	6

Fourth round
(Slovakia) H Nagyová	0	0
5	(France) M Pierce	6	6

==== Section 3 ====
First round
3	(South Africa) A Coetzer	6	6
(Austria) B Paulus	2	0
(Latvia) L Neiland	6	7^{7}
WC	(Australia) C Barclay	3	6^{3}
(United States) K Brandi	4	7	3
(Australia) A Ellwood	6	5	6
PR	(France) L Ghirardi	1	7	6
(Japan) N Kijimuta	6	5	1
(Mexico) A Gavaldón	0	0	r
(South Africa) J Kruger	6	2
(Canada) S Jeyaseelan	6^{2}	6	7
(South Korea) S-h Park	7^{7}	1	5
Q	(United States) A Miller	4	7	6
(Czech Republic) H Suková	6	5	0
(France) S Pitkowski	7	0	0
10	(Germany) A Huber	5	6	6

Second round
3	(South Africa) A Coetzer	2	6	6
(Latvia) L Neiland	6	1	0
(Australia) A Ellwood	4	6	6
PR	(France) L Ghirardi	6	4	1
(South Africa) J Kruger	6	6
(Canada) S Jeyaseelan	3	2
Q	(United States) A Miller	4	0
10	(Germany) A Huber	6	6

Third round
3	(South Africa) A Coetzer	6	6
(Australia) A Ellwood	3	1
(South Africa) J Kruger	7^{7}	3	2
10	(Germany) A Huber	6^{4}	6	6

Fourth round
3	(South Africa) A Coetzer	6	4	5
10	(Germany) A Huber	2	6	7

==== Section 4 ====
First round
16	(Japan) A Sugiyama	4	6	6
(Spain) M Sánchez Lorenzo	6	1	3
(Japan) M Saeki	6	6
(Japan) M Endo	4	3
(Poland) M Grzybowska	6	6
(Romania) C Cristea	3	2
WC	(India) N Vaidyanathan	5	6	6
(Italy) G Pizzichini	7	4	2
Q	(Bulgaria) S Krivencheva	3	6^{7}
Q	(United States) G Helgeson-Nielsen	6	7^{9}
(Germany) A Glass	2	2
(Japan) R Hiraki	6	6
(Russia) E Makarova	6	1	6
(Italy) L Golarsa	4	6	4
(United States) J Lee	0	4
7	(Spain) A Sánchez Vicario	6	6

Second round
16	(Japan) A Sugiyama	6^{4}	7	6
(Japan) M Saeki	7^{7}	5	1
(Poland) M Grzybowska	6	6
WC	(India) N Vaidyanathan	2	1
Q	(United States) G Helgeson-Nielsen	6^{5}	5
(Japan) R Hiraki	7^{7}	7
(Russia) E Makarova	0	0
7	(Spain) A Sánchez Vicario	6	6

Third round
16	(Japan) A Sugiyama	7^{7}	1	6
(Poland) M Grzybowska	6^{5}	6	4
(Japan) R Hiraki	2	3
7	(Spain) A Sánchez Vicario	6	6

Fourth round
16	(Japan) A Sugiyama	2	4
7	(Spain) A Sánchez Vicario	6	6

=== Bottom half ===
==== Section 5 ====
First round
8	(Spain) C Martínez	6	6
(Germany) S Klösel	2	2
WC	(Australia) K Kunce	5	2
(Netherlands) M Oremans	7	6
(Czech Republic) S Kleinová	6^{2}	5
(Spain) V Ruano Pascual	7^{7}	7
(Czech Republic) L Němečková	4	3
(France) A-G Sidot	6	6
(Italy) F Lubiani	4	4
(Russia) T Panova	6	6
(Argentina) M Díaz Oliva	4	1
(Austria) B Schett	6	6
Q	(United States) M Shaughnessy	4	3
(Italy) R Grande	6	6
(Belarus) N Zvereva	2	6	6
12	(Belgium) S Appelmans	6	2	3

Second round
8	(Spain) C Martínez	7	6
(Netherlands) M Oremans	5	2
(Spain) V Ruano Pascual	4	4
(France) A-G Sidot	6	6
(Russia) T Panova	3	2
(Austria) B Schett	6	6
(Italy) R Grande	4	4
(Belarus) N Zvereva	6	6

Third round
8	(Spain) C Martínez	3	6	6
(France) A-G Sidot	6	0	3
(Austria) B Schett	6	6
(Belarus) N Zvereva	3	1

Fourth round
8	(Spain) C Martínez	6	6
(Austria) B Schett	3	3

==== Section 6 ====
First round
9	(France) S Testud	6	6
(Spain) G León García	3	2
(Germany) J Kandarr	6	6
WC	(Australia) S Drake-Brockman	1	4
PR	(Slovakia) J Husárová	4	6	7
(Japan) H Inoue	6	4	5
(Bulgaria) M Maleeva	6	2	2
(Czech Republic) A Gerši	2	6	6
(Thailand) T Tanasugarn	6	6
(Venezuela) M-A Vento	1	3
(Bulgaria) E Pampoulova	6	6
(United States) J Watanabe	2	1
WC	(Australia) R Stubbs	5	1
(Croatia) M Lučić	7	6
(Japan) N Sawamatsu	4	2
4	(Croatia) I Majoli	6	6

Second round
9	(France) S Testud	6^{6}	6	6
(Germany) J Kandarr	7^{8}	0	1
PR	(Slovakia) J Husárová	2	5
(Czech Republic) A Gerši	6	7
(Thailand) T Tanasugarn	6	4	6
(Bulgaria) E Pampoulova	4	6	4
(Croatia) M Lučić	5	4
4	(Croatia) I Majoli	7	6

Third round
9	(France) S Testud	6	6
(Czech Republic) A Gerši	4	2
(Thailand) T Tanasugarn	6	6
4	(Croatia) I Majoli	0	2

Fourth round
9	(France) S Testud	3	6	6
(Thailand) T Tanasugarn	6	1	2

==== Section 7 ====
First round
6	(Romania) I Spîrlea	7^{7}	3	1
(United States) S Williams	6^{5}	6	6
(France) A Dechaume-Balleret	3	0
(United States) V Williams	6	6
(France) A Mauresmo	7^{7}	7
(Italy) S Farina	6^{4}	5
(Switzerland) E Gagliardi	5	1
(Austria) S Plischke	7	6
(Chinese Taipei) S-t Wang	6	4	6
(Argentina) I Gorrochategui	1	6	4
(France) N Dechy	1	2
(Switzerland) P Schnyder	6	6
(Austria) S Dopfer	2	1
(Japan) N Miyagi	6	6
(Australia) N Pratt	1	6	3
13	(United States) L Raymond	6	2	6

Second round
(United States) S Williams	6^{4}	1
(United States) V Williams	7^{7}	6
(France) A Mauresmo	1	6	6
(Austria) S Plischke	6	4	3
(Chinese Taipei) S-t Wang	3	4
(Switzerland) P Schnyder	6	6
(Japan) N Miyagi	2	6	5
13	(United States) L Raymond	6	3	7

Third round
(United States) V Williams	6	6
(France) A Mauresmo	1	4
(Switzerland) P Schnyder	2	6	8
13	(United States) L Raymond	6	3	6

Fourth round
(United States) V Williams	6	6
(Switzerland) P Schnyder	4	1

==== Section 8 ====
First round
15	(Romania) R Dragomir	6	6
(Germany) M Babel	2	1
(Spain) M Serna	6	4	9
(Australia) R McQuillan	3	6	7
(Australia) K-A Guse	6	3	4
(Argentina) F Labat	2	6	6
(Sweden) Å Carlsson	6	2	6
WC	(Australia) E Dominikovic	3	6	4
WC	(Australia) T Musgrave	3	5
(Argentina) P Suárez	6	7
(United States) S Cacic	7	4	6
(Italy) F Perfetti	5	6	8
(Slovakia) K Habšudová	6	6
Q	(United States) S Reeves	3	4
(France) A Cocheteux	2	3
2	(United States) L Davenport	6	6

Second round
15	(Romania) R Dragomir	7^{7}	2	6
(Spain) M Serna	6^{5}	6	3
(Argentina) F Labat	6	5	6
(Sweden) Å Carlsson	4	7	4
(Argentina) P Suárez	3	2
(Italy) F Perfetti	6	6
(Slovakia) K Habšudová	6	0	7
2	(United States) L Davenport	2	6	9

Third round
15	(Romania) R Dragomir	6	7
(Argentina) F Labat	2	5
(Italy) F Perfetti	2	2
2	(United States) L Davenport	6	6

Fourth round
15	(Romania) R Dragomir	0	0
2	(United States) L Davenport	6	6

Preceded by 1997 US Open – Women's singles	Grand Slam women's singles	Succeeded by 1998 French Open – Women's singles
