= 1998 Australian Open – Mixed doubles =

Mixed doubles
- 1998 Australian Open

Final
- Champions: (United States) Venus Williams (United States) Justin Gimelstob
- Runners-up: (Czech Republic) Helena Suková (Czech Republic) Cyril Suk
- Score: 6–2, 6–1

Details
- Draw: 32
- Seeds: 8

Events
Singles	men	women		boys	girls
Doubles	men	women	mixed	boys	girls
WC Singles	men	women	quad
WC Doubles	men	women	quad
Legends	men	women	mixed
- Australian Open

Venus Williams and Justin Gimelstob defeated Helena Suková and Cyril Suk in the final, 6–2, 6–1 to win the Mixed Doubles title at the 1998 Australian Open.

Manon Bollegraf and Rick Leach were the defending champions, but lost in the first round to Kristine Kunce and Jim Grabb.

== Seeds ==
1. n.a
2. (Netherlands) Manon Bollegraf / (United States) Rick Leach (first round)
3. (United States) Lisa Raymond / (United States) Patrick Galbraith (quarterfinals)
4. (Netherlands) Caroline Vis / (India) Mahesh Bhupathi (semifinals)
5. (Czech Republic) Helena Suková / (Czech Republic) Cyril Suk (final)
6. (United States) Katrina Adams / (South Africa) Ellis Ferreira (first round)
7. (Latvia) Larisa Neiland / (South Africa) David Adams (second round)
8. (Argentina) Patricia Tarabini / (Argentina) Daniel Orsanic (first round)

== Draw ==
Key

- Q = Qualifier
- WC = Wild card
- LL = Lucky loser
- Alt = Alternate
- ITF = ITF entry
- PR = Protected ranking
- SR = Special ranking
- SE = Special exempt
- JE = Junior exempt
- JR = Junior Accelerator Programme entrant
- CO = College Accelerator Programme entrant
- NG = Next Gen Accelerator Program entrant
- w/o = Walkover
- r = Retired
- d = Defaulted

=== Final ===
Semifinals
(Russia) Elena Likhovtseva (Belarus) Max Mirnyi	2	1
WC	(United States) Venus Williams (United States) Justin Gimelstob	6	6
4	(Netherlands) Caroline Vis (India) Mahesh Bhupathi	2	6	6^{3}
5	(Czech Republic) Helena Suková (Czech Republic) Cyril Suk	6	3	7^{7}

Final
WC	(United States) Venus Williams (United States) Justin Gimelstob	6	6
5	(Czech Republic) Helena Suková (Czech Republic) Cyril Suk	2	1

=== Top half ===
First round
Alt	(Australia) L Pleming (Australia) W Arthurs	4	6	7
(Japan) R Hiraki (Mexico) D Roditi	6	3	5
(Russia) E Likhovtseva (Belarus) M Mirnyi	6	6
(United States) G Helgeson-Nielsen (United States) F Montana	2	4
(Belarus) N Zvereva (Australia) A Florent	7^{7}	6
WC	(United States) S Williams (Australia) L Hewitt	6^{3}	2
(Australia) R McQuillan (Australia) D Macpherson	6	6
8	(Argentina) P Tarabini (Argentina) D Orsanic	0	0
3	(United States) L Raymond (United States) P Galbraith	6	6
WC	(Australia) A Ellwood (Australia) B Ellwood	3	0
(Czech Republic) H Vildová (Sweden) P Nyborg	3	3
(Netherlands) K Boogert (United States) D Johnson	6	6
(Argentina) I Gorrochategui (Argentina) L Lobo	7^{7}	2	4
(Russia) A Kournikova (The Bahamas) M Knowles	6^{4}	6	6
WC	(United States) V Williams (United States) J Gimelstob	6	7
6	(United States) K Adams (South Africa) E Ferreira	3	5

Second round
Alt	(Australia) L Pleming (Australia) W Arthurs	5	4
(Russia) E Likhovtseva (Belarus) M Mirnyi	7	6
(Belarus) N Zvereva (Australia) A Florent	6	6
(Australia) R McQuillan (Australia) D Macpherson	3	3
3	(United States) L Raymond (United States) P Galbraith	7^{7}	6
(Netherlands) K Boogert (United States) D Johnson	6^{3}	1
(Russia) A Kournikova (The Bahamas) M Knowles	5	2
WC	(United States) V Williams (United States) J Gimelstob	7	6

Quarterfinals
(Russia) E Likhovtseva (Belarus) M Mirnyi	6	6
(Belarus) N Zvereva (Australia) A Florent	3	2
3	(United States) L Raymond (United States) P Galbraith	6^{2}	6	2
WC	(United States) V Williams (United States) J Gimelstob	7^{7}	3	6

Semifinals
(Russia) E Likhovtseva (Belarus) M Mirnyi	2	1
WC	(United States) V Williams (United States) J Gimelstob	6	6

=== Bottom half ===
First round
7	(Latvia) L Neiland (South Africa) D Adams	6	7
(Argentina) M Paz (Argentina) P Albano	4	5
(Australia) K-A Guse (Australia) A Kratzmann	6	1
(Argentina) P Suárez (Ecuador) N Lapentti	2	0	r
(Japan) N Miyagi (United States) K Kinnear	1	6	7^{7}
(Australia) R Stubbs (Australia) J Eagle	6	3	6^{4}
(Italy) R Grande (Belgium) L Pimek	2	0
4	(Netherlands) C Vis (India) M Bhupathi	6	6
5	(Czech Republic) H Suková (Czech Republic) C Suk	5	6	6
(United States) M McGrath (United States) J Waite	7	3	4
Alt	(Netherlands) M Oremans (South Africa) P Norval	6	1	3
(Australia) C Barclay (South Africa) B Talbot	3	6	6
(Romania) R Dragomir (Argentina) L Arnold	3	7	4
(Czech Republic) E Melicharová (North Macedonia) A Kitinov	6	5	6
(Australia) K Kunce (United States) J Grabb	7	6
2	(Netherlands) M Bollegraf (United States) R Leach	5	1

Second round
7	(Latvia) L Neiland (South Africa) D Adams	6	3	4
(Australia) K-A Guse (Australia) A Kratzmann	2	6	6
(Japan) N Miyagi (United States) K Kinnear	6	4	5
4	(Netherlands) C Vis (India) M Bhupathi	4	6	7
5	(Czech Republic) H Suková (Czech Republic) C Suk	6	6
(Australia) C Barclay (South Africa) B Talbot	2	4
(Czech Republic) E Melicharová (North Macedonia) A Kitinov	6	7
(Australia) K Kunce (United States) J Grabb	4	5

Quarterfinals
(Australia) K-A Guse (Australia) A Kratzmann	6	6^{7}	2
4	(Netherlands) C Vis (India) M Bhupathi	4	7^{9}	6
5	(Czech Republic) H Suková (Czech Republic) C Suk	3	7^{7}	6
(Czech Republic) E Melicharová (North Macedonia) A Kitinov	6	6^{1}	4

Semifinals
4	(Netherlands) C Vis (India) M Bhupathi	2	6	6^{3}
5	(Czech Republic) H Suková (Czech Republic) C Suk	6	3	7^{7}
