= Lindsay Davenport =

American former tennis player (born 1976)

Lindsay Davenport Leach
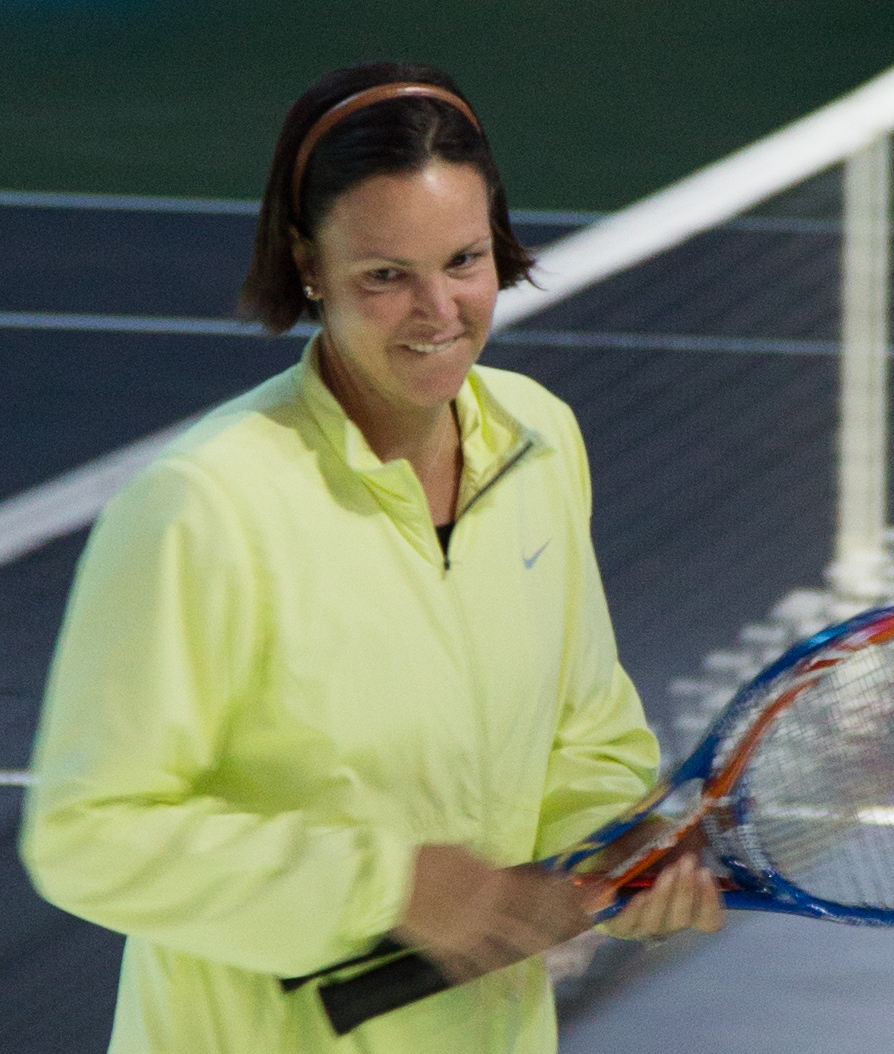
- Davenport in 2013
- Full name: Lindsay Ann Davenport Leach
- Country (sports): United States
- Residence: Laguna Beach, California, US
- Born: June 8, 1976 (age 50) Palos Verdes, California, US
- Height: 6 ft 2.5 in (1.89 m)
- Turned pro: February 22, 1993
- Retired: 2010 (last match)
- Plays: Right-handed (two-handed backhand)
- Coach: Robert Lansdorp; Craig Kardon (1994–1995); Robert Van't Hof (1995–2003); Rick Leach (2004); Adam Peterson (2004–2010)
- Prize money: US$22,166,338: 24th all-time in earnings
- Int. Tennis HoF: 2014 (member page)

Singles
- Career record: 753–194
- Career titles: 55
- Highest ranking: No. 1 (October 12, 1998)

Grand Slam singles results
- Australian Open: W (2000)
- French Open: SF (1998)
- Wimbledon: W (1999)
- US Open: W (1998)

Other tournaments
- Grand Slam Cup: SF (1999)
- Tour Finals: W (1999)
- Olympic Games: W (1996)

Doubles
- Career record: 387–116
- Career titles: 38
- Highest ranking: No. 1 (October 20, 1997)

Grand Slam doubles results
- Australian Open: F (1996, 1997, 1998, 1999, 2001, 2005)
- French Open: W (1996)
- Wimbledon: W (1999)
- US Open: W (1997)

Other doubles tournaments
- Tour Finals: W (1996, 1997, 1998)
- Olympic Games: QF (2008)

Mixed doubles
- Career record: 18–6
- Career titles: 0

Grand Slam mixed doubles results
- Australian Open: SF (1995)
- Wimbledon: SF (1994, 1995, 1996, 1997, 2004)

Team competitions
- Fed Cup: W (1996, 1999, 2000)
- Hopman Cup: W (2004)

Coaching career
- Madison Keys (2014–2015)
Medal record
Women's tennis
Representing United States
Olympic Games
Gold medal – first place	1996 Atlanta	Women's singles

Lindsay Ann Davenport Leach (born June 8, 1976) is an American former professional tennis player. She was ranked as the world No. 1 in women's singles by the Women's Tennis Association (WTA) for 98 weeks (including as the year-end No. 1 four times), and as the world No. 1 in women's doubles for 32 weeks. Davenport won 55 WTA Tour-level singles titles, including three majors (the 1998 US Open, 1999 Wimbledon Championships, and 2000 Australian Open), the gold medal at the 1996 Atlanta Olympics, and the 1999 Tour Finals. She also won 38 doubles titles, including three majors (the 1996 French Open, 1997 US Open, and the 1999 Wimbledon Championships) and three consecutive Tour Finals.

In 2005, TENNIS Magazine ranked Davenport as the 29th-greatest player (male or female) of the preceding 40 years. She amassed career-earnings of US$22,166,338; formerly first in the all-time rankings. Davenport was inducted into the International Tennis Hall of Fame in 2014.

== Early life ==
Lindsay Davenport is the daughter of Wink Davenport, who was a member of the U.S. volleyball team at the 1968 Summer Olympics in Mexico City, and Ann L. Davenport, the president of the Southern California Volleyball Association. Davenport was born to an athletic family. While her two older sisters, Leiann and Shannon, played volleyball, Lindsay began playing tennis at age six. She was coached by Robert Lansdorp, who had previously coached Tracy Austin. She attended Chadwick School in Palos Verdes Peninsula, California. At age 16, her family moved to Murrieta, California, where she attended and graduated from Murrieta Valley High School, and she began to work with, among others, Robert Van't Hof. At age 16, Davenport joined the United States Tennis Association junior national team. She had a rapid growth spurt — about six inches in two years — which affected her coordination, but did not hinder her performance. She excelled at junior level competitions and swept the singles and doubles titles at the National Girls' 18s and Clay Court Championships in 1991 and won the Junior U.S. Open in 1992.

== Career ==
=== 1990–1993 ===
She won the girls' 16s singles at the prestigious Ojai Tennis Tournament in 1990.

While Davenport's first play dated back to 1991, she officially became a professional two years after her first professional-level matches. Davenport's doubles success in 1993 was a 17–16 record while she reached the top 100 in doubles rankings. She reached the third round at the 1993 Australian Open doubles competition with Chanda Rubin. Davenport entered the top 20, despite coming into her first tournament that year ranked no. 162. She qualified for the 1993 Australian Open, reaching the third round before falling to Mary Pierce.

At the Indian Wells Masters, Davenport reached the quarterfinals ranked no. 99, but lost to 7th-ranked and future doubles partner Mary Joe Fernández. Later that year, Davenport won her first Tier III title at the WTA Swiss Open where she beat Nicole Bradtke in three sets in the finals. She reached the third round at the 1993 Wimbledon Championships, and at the 1993 US Open, the American reached the fourth round ranked no. 24. 1993 is also notable because it was the one time she faced Martina Navratilova, falling in three sets, 6–1, 3–6, 5–7, in the Oakland semifinals.

=== 1994 ===
Davenport won the first professional tournament she entered in Brisbane, Australia. At the Australian Open, she reached her first Grand Slam quarterfinal, defeating no. 5 Mary Joe Fernández in the fourth round, before losing in the quarterfinals to top-ranked Steffi Graf. Davenport then reached the semifinals at Indian Wells, California and Miami and won the title in Lucerne. At Wimbledon, Davenport reached her second Grand Slam quarterfinal. Ranked ninth, Davenport defeated tenth ranked Gabriela Sabatini, before losing to third ranked Conchita Martínez, who went on to win the tournament. In November, she reached her first WTA Tour Championship final, losing to Sabatini.

In doubles, Davenport won Indian Wells with Lisa Raymond and reached the French Open doubles final with Raymond, where they lost to Gigi Fernández and Natasha Zvereva. Davenport teamed with Arantxa Sánchez Vicario to win the title in Oakland, defeating Gigi Fernández and Martina Navratilova in the final.

In December 1994, Davenport hired Craig Kardon as her coach.

=== 1995 ===
Davenport started the year by reaching the final of the tournament in Sydney, where she lost to Gabriela Sabatini. Davenport again reached the Australian Open quarterfinals and the following week, lost to Kimiko Date in the final of the tournament in Tokyo.

On clay, Davenport won the tournament in Strasbourg on her first attempt, defeating Kimiko Date in the final. Date, however, turned the tables at the French Open, defeating Davenport in the fourth round.

At Wimbledon, Davenport was upset in the fourth round by Mary Joe Fernández. At the final Grand Slam tournament of the year, the US Open, Davenport was again upset, this time in the second round by Zina Garrison Jackson.

In doubles, Davenport and Jana Novotná started the year by winning the tournament in Sydney. Davenport and Lisa Raymond then lost in the Australian Open semifinals to the top seeded team of Gigi Fernández and Natasha Zvereva. Davenport teamed with Nicole Arendt to reach the French Open semifinals, where they lost to the top seeded team of Novotná and Arantxa Sánchez Vicario. At Wimbledon, Davenport and Raymond, the fourth seeded team, were upset in the first round. At the US Open, Davenport and Raymond were again the fourth seeded team and were upset in the third round by fifteenth seeded Lori McNeil and Helena Suková. In other tournaments, Davenport and Raymond won in Indian Wells, and Davenport and Mary Joe Fernández won in Tokyo (the non-Tier I tournament) and Strasbourg.

After her one-year contract with Kardon had ended, Davenport hired Robert Van't Hof as her full-time coach.

=== 1996 ===
Davenport's year began with a runner-up finish in Sydney. She was a quarterfinalist at the Australian Open. Davenport then reached the semifinals of the tournament in Indian Wells, California, where she lost to Steffi Graf.

On clay, Davenport won the Strasbourg tournament and reached the French Open quarterfinals, losing to Conchita Martínez.

During the summer, Davenport won the tournament in Los Angeles, defeating Graf for the first time in her career in the semifinals, before defeating Anke Huber in the final. Davenport then won the gold medal at the Summer Olympics, defeating Mary Joe Fernández in the semifinal and Arantxa Sánchez Vicario in the final.

In doubles, Davenport teamed with Mary Joe Fernández to win the tournament in Sydney, before losing in the final of the Australian Open to Chanda Rubin and Sánchez Vicario. Davenport and Fernandez then won the French Open doubles title, defeating Gigi Fernández and Natasha Zvereva in the final. The two also won the tournament in Oakland and the year-end Chase Championships together. Davenport partnered with Zvereva to win the tournament in Los Angeles.

=== 1997 ===
Davenport lost in the fourth round of the Australian Open to Kimberly Po. She then won the tournaments in Oklahoma City and Indian Wells, California for the first time in her career.

Davenport began her clay-court season by winning the tournament in Amelia Island, Florida. However, she lost to Iva Majoli, the eventual champion, in the fourth round at the French Open, despite being up a set and 4–0 in the second set.

At Wimbledon, Davenport lost to Denisa Chládková in the second round. She then lost to Monica Seles in the final at Los Angeles, after beating top-ranked Martina Hingis in the semifinals. After winning in Atlanta, Davenport reached her first grand slam semifinal at the US Open, losing to Hingis. Davenport won the titles in Zürich and Chicago, before losing the Philadelphia final to Hingis in a third set tie-break.

In doubles, Davenport was the runner-up in Sydney with Natasha Zvereva and at the Australian Open with Lisa Raymond. She won the US Open with Czech partner Jana Novotná. Davenport's other doubles titles were in Tokyo, Indian Wells, Amelia Island, and Berlin.

=== 1998 ===
Davenport started 1998 by reaching the singles semifinals of the Australian Open, which was her second consecutive Grand Slam singles semifinal. At the tournament in Tokyo, Davenport, ranked second, defeated Martina Hingis, ranked first, in the final. Davenport then lost in the Indian Wells, California, final to Hingis, after defeating Steffi Graf, and in Miami, she fell in the quarterfinals to Anna Kournikova. At the French Open, Davenport defeated defending champion Iva Majoli in the quarterfinals, before losing to Arantxa Sánchez Vicario in the semifinals. Davenport won titles in San Diego, Stanford, and Los Angeles.

Davenport's next victory on tour was her first Grand Slam singles title at the 1998 US Open, defeating fifth-ranked Venus Williams in the semifinals and top-ranked Hingis in the final. She became the first American-born woman to win the U.S. Open since Chris Evert in 1982.

Davenport then won Zürich and lost to 17th-ranked Graf in Philadelphia despite attaining the no. 1 ranking. Davenport finished the year with a loss to Hingis in the final of the Chase Championships .

In doubles, Davenport reached the final of the 1998 Australian Open with Natasha Zvereva, where they lost to the wildcard team of Hingis and Mirjana Lučić. Davenport and Zvereva lost to Hingis and Lučić again in the Tokyo final, and then won both Indian Wells and Berlin, both times defeating Alexandra Fusai and Nathalie Tauziat in the final.

Davenport and Zvereva then lost to Hingis and Jana Novotná in the French Open, Wimbledon, and US Open doubles finals. Davenport won San Diego and Stanford with Zvereva and lost in the US Open doubles final. Davenport won Filderstadt, and then the year-end doubles championship with Zvereva, defeating Fusai and Tauziat in three sets. In 1998, Davenport reached all four Grand Slam doubles finals with Zvereva, losing to teams that included Hingis all four times.

=== 1999 ===
Davenport started 1999 by winning the Sydney singles final and reaching the Australian Open singles semifinal, before losing to Amélie Mauresmo. She teamed with Natasha Zvereva to reach the doubles final, before losing to Martina Hingis and Anna Kournikova.

At the Toray Pan Pacific Open in Tokyo, Davenport and Zvereva beat Hingis and Jana Novotná, to whom they had lost in three of the four 1998 Grand Slam doubles finals. Davenport's second singles title of the year was at Madrid where she defeated lucky loser Paola Suárez in the final.

At Roland Garros, she reached the quarterfinals losing to Steffi Graf. Along the way, she defeated qualifier and future four-times French Open champion Justine Henin in the second round. Davenport's next tournament championship was at Wimbledon. In the final, she defeated Steffi Graf in Graf's last career Grand Slam match. Davenport also won the doubles title at Wimbledon with Corina Morariu, defeating Mariaan de Swardt and Elena Tatarkova in the final.

After Wimbledon, Davenport won the singles and doubles titles in Stanford and won San Diego in doubles with Morariu over Serena and Venus Williams in the final, the only doubles final the sisters have ever lost in their playing careers. She lost the US Open semifinal to eventual champion Serena Williams. To close the year, Davenport won two additional singles and the Chase Championships with a victory over Hingis in the final.

=== 2000 ===
Davenport started the year by losing the Sydney singles final against Amélie Mauresmo.

Her next event was the 2000 Australian Open, which she won in singles without the loss of a set. Seeded second, Davenport defeated top-seeded Martina Hingis in the final. She and Corina Morariu lost in the doubles semifinals to Hingis and Mary Pierce. Two events later, at the Indian Wells, California tournament, Davenport again defeated Hingis and won the doubles title with Morariu over Anna Kournikova and Natasha Zvereva in the final. Hingis defeated Davenport in the Miami final.

At the French Open, Davenport was upset by the 22nd-ranked Dominique Van Roost in three sets in the first round. Van Roost again beat her at The Hastings Direct International Championships in Eastbourne.

Davenport reached the Wimbledon final, where she was beaten by Venus Williams. Davenport once again lost to Venus in the Stanford final and to Serena Williams in the Los Angeles final. She lost in the US Open final to Venus.

After losing to Hingis in the Zürich final, Davenport won two consecutive titles in Linz, defeating Venus Williams, and in Philadelphia. She upset Arantxa Sánchez Vicario at the Chase Championships by serving her all love games, then helped the United States win the 2000 Fed Cup over Spain.

=== 2001 ===
Davenport was at least a quarterfinalist in all seventeen of her singles events. She won seven singles titles, with victories in Tokyo, Scottsdale, Eastbourne, Los Angeles, Filderstadt, Zürich, and Linz. After clinching the year-end number one ranking in a semifinal win over Clijsters (where she injured her knee at the end of the match), she withdrew in the final of the year-end Chase Championships against Serena Williams. She was a semifinalist at the Australian Open, a semifinalist at Wimbledon, and a quarterfinalist at the US Open. She lost in the Australian Open doubles final with Morariu to Venus and Serena Williams. She teamed with Lisa Raymond to win the doubles titles in Filderstadt and Zürich.

=== 2002 ===
Davenport did not win a singles title in 2002. She missed the Australian Open, French Open, and Wimbledon. She played her first singles event in July, losing in the Stanford semifinals to Kim Clijsters. Davenport then reached the semifinals of the Tier I San Diego tournament, where she lost to Venus Williams. At her next tournament in Los Angeles, she lost in the final to Chanda Rubin. She then lost to Venus in New Haven and to Serena Williams in the US Open semifinals. She reached two more finals during 2002, losing in Moscow to Magdalena Maleeva and in Zürich to Patty Schnyder. At the year-end Chase Championships, Davenport lost to Monica Seles, after holding seven match points, her third loss to Seles, having a match point opportunity on all three occasions.

Davenport played her first doubles tournament of the year in Filderstadt in October, where she partnered with Lisa Raymond to win the title. Her relationship with Coach Robert Van't Hof ended.

=== 2003 ===
Davenport started the year by hiring Rick Leach as her coach, but this association lasted only a short time. She then hired Adam Peterson. She reached the final of the tournament in Sydney, where she lost to Kim Clijsters. She then reached the fourth round of the Australian Open, where she lost to Justine Henin. Davenport then won in Tokyo and lost in the Indian Wells, California final to Clijsters. At the remaining Grand Slam tournaments of the year, she lost in the French Open fourth round, the Wimbledon quarterfinals, and the US Open semifinals. She was the runner-up at tournaments in Amelia Island, Florida, Los Angeles, and New Haven.

Davenport and Lisa Raymond reached the doubles semifinals of the Australian Open, where they lost to Serena Williams and Venus Williams. Davenport and Raymond won Indian Wells, defeating Clijsters and Ai Sugiyama. Davenport and Raymond also won in Amelia Island, over Paola Suárez and Virginia Ruano Pascual, and in Eastbourne, over Jennifer Capriati and Magüi Serna. Davenport and Raymond lost in the Wimbledon semifinals to Clijsters and Sugiyama.

=== 2004 ===
Davenport won a tour-high seven titles, including four straight during the summer (Stanford, Los Angeles, San Diego, and Cincinnati). She also had the most match wins on the WTA Tour, with 63. She finished the year ranked first for the third time in her career. She defeated Venus and Serena Williams for the first time since 2000, which she said instilled belief in her that she could win more Grand Slam tournaments.

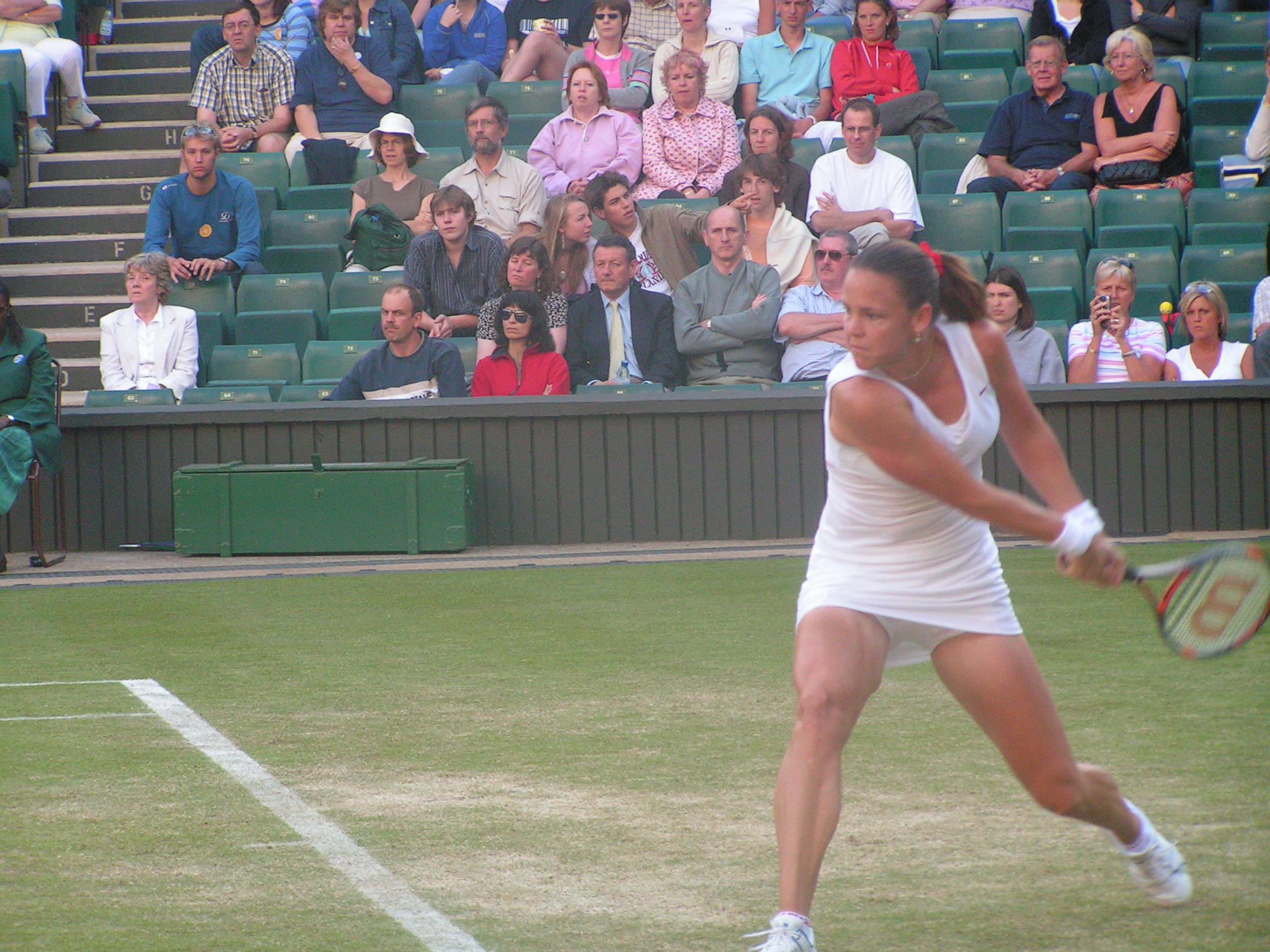
Davenport preparing to return a ball at the 2004 Wimbledon tournament

=== 2005 ===
Davenport's success continued into 2005, when she reached her first Grand Slam final, at the Australian Open, since the 2000 US Open; she fell to Serena Williams in three sets.

At the tournament in Indian Wells, California, in March, Davenport made history by defeating world no. 3 Maria Sharapova, 6–0, 6–0. It marked the first time that a player ranked in the top 3 had ever been "shut out" on the WTA tour and was the first time Sharapova had failed to win a game during a match. This turned out to be Davenport's only career victory against Sharapova.

In April, she won the Bausch & Lomb Championships in Amelia Island, Florida for the third time, defeating Silvia Farina Elia in the final. In the quarterfinals of that tournament, Davenport defeated Venus Williams for the fourth consecutive time.

Davenport bypassed the European clay-court season and went to the French Open without having played a professional competitive match for weeks. She confounded expectations with a run to the quarterfinals on her least favourite surface, including a come-from-behind victory over Kim Clijsters in the fourth round. Davenport lost to eventual runner-up Mary Pierce.

At Wimbledon, Davenport was the top seed and made it easily to the fourth round, where she was tested again by Clijsters, but came through in three sets to win her second successive match against the Belgian. Davenport then reached the semifinals, where her match against Amélie Mauresmo was interrupted by rain and was completed over the course of two days. Davenport eventually defeated Mauresmo and faced 14th-seeded Venus Williams in an all-American final. Davenport led most of the way, as she served for the match at 6–5 in the second set, and had a match point at 5–4 in the third set. Williams went on to win, 4–6, 7–6, 9–7, in the longest (in terms of time) women's Wimbledon final in history. In that match, Davenport sustained a serious back injury while leading 4–2 (40–15) in the final set, although she acknowledged after the match that the injury did not cause her defeat and that Williams was the superior mentally strong player on the day. The injury forced Davenport to withdraw from Fed Cup competition. She returned to the tour at the Stanford tournament. After reinjuring her back in a warmup just hours before her match, Davenport retired while trailing 0–5 in the first set. This back injury then forced her to withdraw from other hard-court events in San Diego and Los Angeles.

Davenport returned to the WTA Tour in August, winning her comeback tournament in New Haven without dropping a set. Davenport then reached the quarterfinals of the US Open, where she held a match point on Elena Dementieva, before falling in the third set tie-break. Davenport briefly lost the no. 1 ranking following the event.

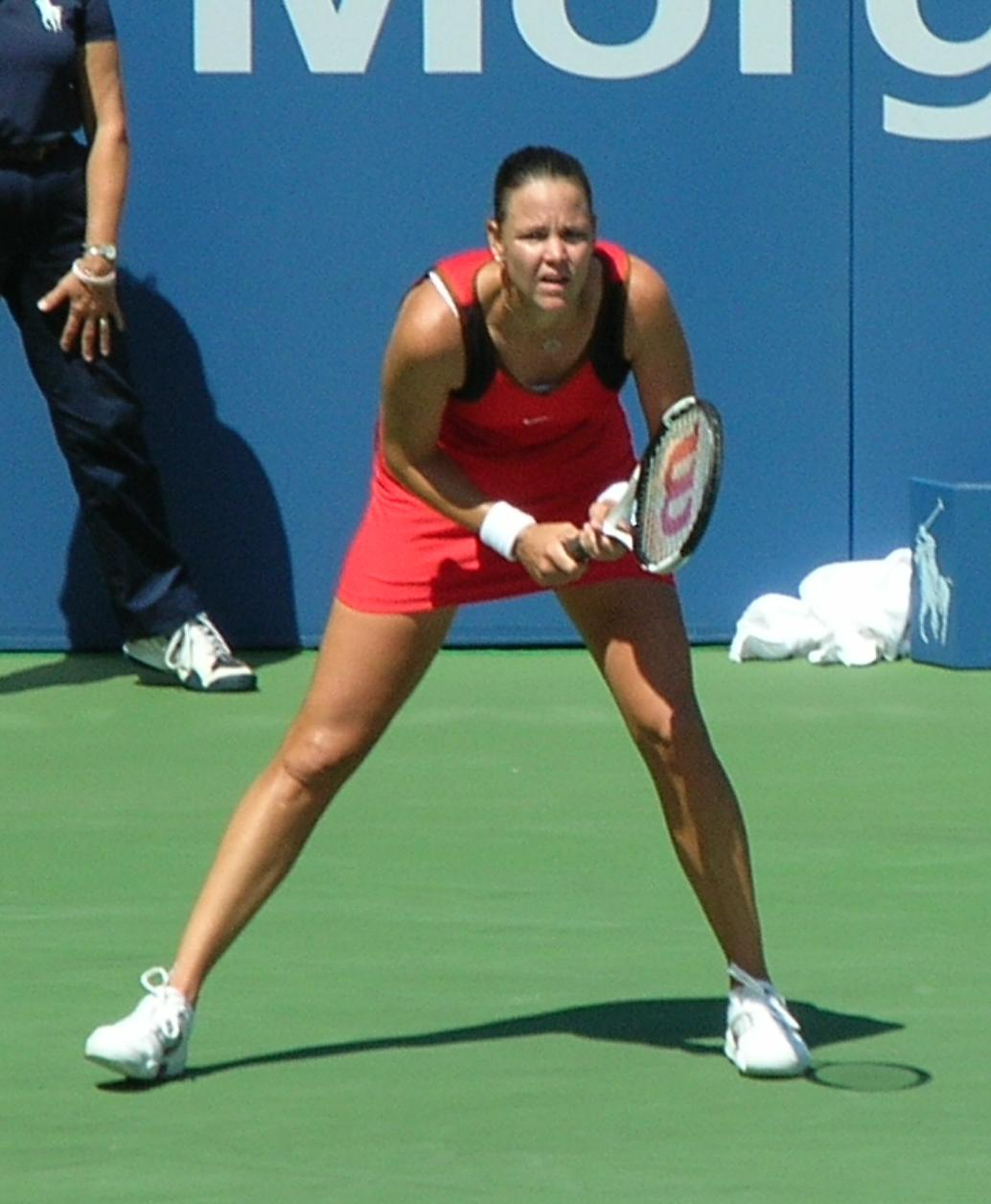
Davenport preparing to return serve at the 2006 U.S. Open against Katarina Srebotnik of Slovenia in the third round on the Grandstand court

After the loss at the US Open, Davenport captured the title in Bali without dropping a set, and subsequently qualified for the WTA Tour Championships. She then won the title in Filderstadt, defeating Mauresmo in the final for the second consecutive year. The win made her only the tenth woman ever to win 50 career WTA singles titles.

In Zürich, Davenport saved two match points while defeating Daniela Hantuchová. The win assured Davenport of recapturing the world no. 1 ranking from Sharapova the following week. In the final, Davenport defeated sixth seeded Patty Schnyder for her fourth title in Zürich and her sixth title of 2005, second only to Clijsters's nine. It was also the first time Davenport had saved match points en route to a victory since the 1999 U.S. Open. The Zürich title left her with eleven Tier I titles, second among active players.

Davenport was a semifinalist at the WTA tour year-end championships (losing to Pierce in two tie-breaks), which ensured that she finished the year ranked no. 1. 2005 was the fourth time that Davenport ended the year ranked No. 1, joining Steffi Graf, Martina Navratilova, and Chris Evert as the only female players to end a year ranked first at least four times.

In 2005, TENNIS Magazine ranked Davenport 29th in its list of the 40 greatest players of the tennis era.

=== 2006 ===
On February 22, 2006, Davenport became just the eighth woman in WTA history to win 700 singles matches, when she handed out her fourth career "double bagel", defeating Elena Likhovtseva in the second round of the Dubai tournament.

At the March tournament in Indian Wells, California, Davenport lost in the fourth round to Martina Hingis. She was then absent from the tour until August because of a back injury. She returned in Los Angeles, losing a second-round match to Samantha Stosur. It was Davenport's earliest exit from a tournament since early 2003. Davenport attributed the loss to her having resumed training only three weeks prior to the start of the tournament. Davenport had re-hired Adam Peterson as her coach, with whom she worked during her 2004–05 resurgence.

At the tournament in New Haven, Davenport defeated world no. 1 Amélie Mauresmo in the quarterfinals, but was forced to retire with a right shoulder injury while playing Justine Henin in the final.

Despite injury, Davenport reached the US Open quarterfinals, where she again lost to Henin.

Davenport's last competitive match before the December announcement of her pregnancy was a quarterfinal loss in Beijing to top-ranked Mauresmo. It was Mauresmo's first win over Davenport after nine consecutive losses.

=== 2007 ===
On July 18, 2007, Davenport announced that she would return to the WTA Tour. At her first tournament, she partnered with Lisa Raymond in the doubles competition at New Haven, where they lost in the first round to top seeds Cara Black and Liezel Huber.

Davenport returned to singles competition in Bali, where she won her first title since 2005, defeating Daniela Hantuchová in the final. En route to the title, Davenport defeated third ranked Jelena Janković, among others. Davenport and her partner Hantuchová also advanced to the semifinals in Bali, before withdrawing from the tournament.

Davenport's second tournament was in Beijing, where she defeated fourth-seeded Russian Elena Dementieva in the quarterfinals, before losing to Janković in the semifinals.

Davenport's third tournament was in Quebec City, Canada, defeating second-seeded Vera Zvonareva in the semifinals and Julia Vakulenko in the final. This was Davenport's 53rd career singles title and lifted her to no. 73 in the WTA rankings.

=== 2008 ===
Davenport won the ASB Classic in Auckland, New Zealand, the first WTA tour event of the year. Davenport defeated Aravane Rezaï in the final. This raised her ranking to world no. 52. She was the only player in the WTA top 100 that had fewer than 10 tournaments counting towards her world ranking.

At the first Grand Slam tournament of the year, the Australian Open, Davenport lost in the second round to eventual champion Maria Sharapova, 1–6, 3–6. This was the first time that Davenport had lost to Sharapova in straight sets.

On January 14, 2008, Davenport surpassed Steffi Graf in career prize money earned on the women's tour, garnering a total of US$21,897,501.

In March, Davenport won her second tournament of the year and 55th career singles title by beating Olga Govortsova in the final of the Regions Morgan Keegan Championships & The Cellular South Cup in Memphis, Tennessee. She tied Virginia Wade for seventh place on the list of most singles titles won during the open era. Davenport also teamed with Lisa Raymond to win the doubles title.

At the Tier I Pacific Life Open in Indian Wells, California, Davenport lost in the quarterfinals to Jelena Janković, 6–2, retired. She retired from the match because of a back injury sustained before the match started. At the Tier I Sony Ericsson Open in Key Biscayne, Florida, Davenport defeated world no. 2 and second-seeded Ana Ivanovic in the third round, 6–4, 6–2, before losing her fourth-round match with Dinara Safina, 3–6, 4–6.

In her first clay-court tournament since 2005, Davenport reached the semifinals of the Bausch & Lomb Championships in Amelia Island, Florida, where she defaulted her match with Sharapova before it began, due to illness. Citing undisclosed personal reasons, Davenport withdrew from the French Open five days before the tournament began.

At Wimbledon, Davenport was seeded 25th, won her first-round match, and then withdrew from the tournament because of a right knee injury.

On August 8, 2008, Davenport withdrew from the singles competition at the Olympic Games in Beijing because of a lingering knee injury. She and her partner, world no. 1 doubles player Liezel Huber, lost in the women's doubles quarterfinals.

At the US Open, Davenport was seeded 23rd and lost to 12th-seeded Marion Bartoli in the third round. Davenport was scheduled to play the Fortis Championships Luxembourg in October, but withdrew before the start of the tournament.

=== 2009 ===
Davenport announced her intention to play in the 2009 Australian Open in January, ending speculation that she would be retiring from the sport. However, she withdrew from the event when she learned that she was expecting her second child. It was announced on June 30, 2009, that Davenport had given birth to a baby girl.

=== 2010 ===
In her first tournament since the 2008 US Open, Davenport played mixed doubles at Wimbledon with Bob Bryan, where they received a wild card. They made it to the second round before falling to Daniel Nestor and Bethanie Mattek-Sands.

Davenport also announced her intention to play doubles at two tournaments in the American hard-court season. The first tournament was the women's doubles event at the 2010 Bank of the West Classic, where she won the title partnering Liezel Huber. She followed this with the 2010 Mercury Insurance Open, again with Huber. They lost in the quarterfinals to Bethanie Mattek-Sands and Yan Zi.

=== 2011 ===
At the 2011 French Open she won the Women's Legends Doubles event with partner Martina Hingis. Davenport went on to win the Wimbledon Invitational Doubles event, partnering once again with Hingis. World Team Tennis announced that Davenport would not be able to compete for the season because she was pregnant with her third child.

== World TeamTennis ==
Davenport has played 11 seasons with World TeamTennis starting in 1993 when she debuted in the league with the Sacramento Capitals and proceeded to win three championships with the team in 1997, 1998 and 2007. She also played with the St. Louis Aces in 2001, 2010 and 2011; New York Buzz in 2002; Newport Beach Breakers 2003 and 2008; Sacramento Capitals in 1993, 1997, 1998 and 2007 and the Orange County Breakers in 2012.

Davenport won multiple league honors during her WTT career including Female MVP 1997 and 2010; Women's Singles scoring leader 1997, 1998; Female Rookie of the Year 1993; Mixed Doubles scoring leader 1998 (w/ Brian MacPhie).

== Playing style ==
Davenport was an aggressive baseliner, whose game was built around her powerful serve and groundstrokes, which were used to dominate play, and hit winners both crosscourt and down-the-line. Due to her aggressive and risky playing style, she typically hit large numbers of both winners and unforced errors. Gabriela Sabatini once commented that, "[Lindsay] likes to hit the ball hard into the corner. Very, very hard". She would typically utilise aggressive serve/groundstroke combinations to finish points quickly, and, by aiming for the corners and the lines, Davenport was able to dictate play from the baseline. Davenport has been described as one of the cleanest ball strikers in WTA history, as well as one of the most powerful; in 2021, Serena Williams described Davenport in retrospect as the "hardest" hitter she had ever faced, and the most "powerful" player of all time. Davenport possessed an exceptionally powerful first serve, which peaked at 121 mph (195 km/h), allowing her to serve multiple aces in any given match. She also possessed powerful and effective kick and slice serves, which she deployed as second serves; these prevented double faults, and allowed her to dictate play from a defensive position. She was known for her forehand, which was hit flat with an Eastern forehand grip, affording consistent depth, power, and penetration; Gigi Fernández once remarked that Davenport has developed "a forehand as good as Steffi Graf's." She was also known for her powerful two-handed backhand, which was similarly hit hard and flat. Her lack of court speed and mobility was her greatest weakness throughout her career, until she overhauled her conditioning program and lost 30 pounds beginning in 1995; she was also known for her mental strength. She was a thirteen-time grand slam finalist in doubles, although she typically only approached the net in singles matches to retrieve short balls, or to finish a point when she had created an opportunity to attack with her powerful overhead smash. Throughout her career, Davenport rarely used defensive shots, instead predicating her game on pure power and aggression.

== Equipment and endorsements ==
Davenport was endorsed by Nike for clothing, shoes, and on-court apparel. She was also endorsed by Wilson for racquets throughout her career, typically utilising a racquet from the Wilson Hammer range.

== Coaching ==
Davenport became the coach of Madison Keys prior to the commencement of the 2015 season. Already the pair have made an impact together, with Keys advancing to the semi-finals of a Grand Slam tournament for the first time at the 2015 Australian Open, where she upset reigning Wimbledon champion Petra Kvitová en route.

== Personal life ==
Davenport married Jon Leach, a Merrill Lynch investment banker and former University of Southern California All-American tennis player, on April 25, 2003, in Hawaii. He is the brother of her former coach Rick Leach. Davenport took a break from competitive tennis in late 2006 and much of 2007 to have a baby. In 2007, she gave birth to a son, Jagger Leach, in Newport Beach, California. She gave birth to a daughter in 2009 also in Newport Beach, California. She gave birth to her third child, a daughter, in 2012. The couple's fourth child (and third daughter) was born in 2014. She owns homes in the Irvine, California, neighborhood of Shady Canyon, in Laguna Beach, California, and in Kona, Hawaii.

Jagger Leach made his Major debut in the juniors tournament at the 2024 Australian Open. He reached the quarterfinals of the juniors tournament at Wimbledon 2024.

== Records ==
- These records were attained in the Open Era of tennis.

Championship	Years	Record accomplished	Player tied
Grand Slam	1998; 1999; 2000	3 different Grand Slam titles won without losing a set	Chris Evert; Steffi Graf; Serena Williams

== Awards and accomplishments ==
- Named in 1993 the Rookie of the Year by both TENNIS Magazine and World TeamTennis.
- 1996 International Tennis Federation (ITF) World Champion in women's doubles.
- 1998 ITF World Champion in women's singles and doubles.
- 1998 Tennis Magazine player of the year.
- 1998 and 1999 Women's Tennis Association (WTA) player of the year.
- Diamond ACES award winner in 1998 and 1999.
- Named the U.S. Olympic Committee's female athlete of the month for July 1999 after winning the women's doubles and singles at Wimbledon.
- Voted by journalists at the 2000 French Open as the winner of the Prix Orange, which goes to the player who has shone in the tennis world the international essence of fairness, kindness, availability, and friendliness.
- Re-elected to the WTA player council in 2002.
- Voted by the International Tennis Writers Association as a joint winner of the 2004 women's Ambassador for Tennis award.
- 2007 Women's Tennis Association (WTA) Comeback Player of the Year.

== Career statistics ==
=== Grand Slam tournament performance timelines ===
Key
W	F	SF	QF	#R	RR	Q#	P#	DNQ	A	Z#	PO	G	S	B	NMS	NTI	P	NH

(W) winner; (F) finalist; (SF) semifinalist; (QF) quarterfinalist; (#R) rounds 4, 3, 2, 1; (RR) round-robin stage; (Q#) qualification round; (P#) preliminary round; (DNQ) did not qualify; (A) absent; (Z#) Davis/Fed Cup Zonal Group (with number indication) or (PO) play-off; (G) gold, (S) silver or (B) bronze Olympic/Paralympic medal; (NMS) not a Masters tournament; (NTI) not a Tier I tournament; (P) postponed; (NH) not held; (SR) strike rate (events won / competed); (W–L) win–loss record.

==== Singles ====
Tournament	1991	1992	1993	1994	1995	1996	1997	1998	1999	2000	2001	2002	2003	2004	2005	2006	2007	2008	Career SR	Career W–L
Australian Open	A	A	3R	QF	QF	4R	4R	SF	SF	W	SF	A	4R	QF	F	QF	A	2R	1 / 14	56–13
French Open	A	A	1R	3R	4R	QF	4R	SF	QF	1R	A	A	4R	4R	QF	A	A	A	0 / 11	31–11
Wimbledon	A	Q1	3R	QF	4R	2R	2R	QF	W	F	SF	A	QF	SF	F	A	A	2R	1 / 13	49–11
US Open	1R	2R	4R	3R	2R	4R	SF	W	SF	F	QF	SF	SF	SF	QF	QF	A	3R	1 / 17	62–16
Win–loss	0–1	1–1	7–4	12–4	11–4	11–4	12–4	21–3	21–3	19–3	14–3	5–1	15–4	17–4	20–4	8–2	0–0	4–2	N/A	198–51

==== Doubles ====
Tournament	1991	1992	1993	1994	1995	1996	1997	1998	1999	2000	2001	2002	2003	2004	2005	2006	2007	2008	Career SR	Career W–L
Australian Open	A	A	3R	3R	SF	F	F	F	F	SF	F	A	SF	3R	F	A	A	3R	0 / 13	
French Open	A	A	1R	F	SF	W	3R	F	SF	A	A	A	3R	A	A	A	A	A	1 / 8	
Wimbledon	A	A	2R	3R	1R	QF	QF	F	W	A	A	A	SF	A	2R	A	A	A	1 / 9	
US Open	1R	1R	1R	QF	3R	A	W	F	QF	A	A	A	A	A	A	A	A	3R	1 / 9	
Win–loss																				

=== Grand Slam tournament finals ===
==== Singles: 7 (3 titles, 4 runner-ups) ====
Result	Year	Tournament	Surface	Opponent	Score
Win	1998	US Open	Hard	(Switzerland) Martina Hingis	6–3, 7–5
Win	1999	Wimbledon	Grass	(Germany) Steffi Graf	6–4, 7–5
Win	2000	Australian Open	Hard	(Switzerland) Martina Hingis	6–1, 7–5
Loss	2000	Wimbledon	Grass	(United States) Venus Williams	3–6, 6–7^{(3–7)}
Loss	2000	US Open	Hard	(United States) Venus Williams	4–6, 5–7
Loss	2005	Australian Open	Hard	(United States) Serena Williams	6–2, 3–6, 0–6
Loss	2005	Wimbledon	Grass	(United States) Venus Williams	6–4, 6–7^{(4–7)}, 7–9

==== Doubles: 13 (3 titles, 10 runner-ups) ====
Result	Year	Tournament	Surface	Partner	Opponents	Score
Loss	1994	French Open	Clay	(United States) Lisa Raymond	(United States) Gigi Fernández (Belarus) Natasha Zvereva	6–2, 6–2
Loss	1996	Australian Open	Hard	(United States) Mary Joe Fernández	(United States) Chanda Rubin (Spain) Arantxa Sánchez Vicario	7–5, 2–6, 6–4
Win	1996	French Open	Clay	(United States) Mary Joe Fernández	(United States) Gigi Fernández (Belarus) Natasha Zvereva	6–2, 6–1
Loss	1997	Australian Open (2)	Hard	(United States) Lisa Raymond	(Switzerland) Martina Hingis (Belarus) Natasha Zvereva	6–2, 6–2
Win	1997	US Open	Hard	(Czech Republic) Jana Novotná	(United States) Gigi Fernández (Belarus) Natasha Zvereva	6–3, 6–4
Loss	1998	Australian Open (3)	Hard	(Belarus) Natasha Zvereva	(Switzerland) Martina Hingis (Croatia) Mirjana Lučić	6–4, 2–6, 6–3
Loss	1998	French Open (2)	Clay	(Belarus) Natasha Zvereva	(Switzerland) Martina Hingis (Czech Republic) Jana Novotná	6–1, 7–6
Loss	1998	Wimbledon	Grass	(Belarus) Natasha Zvereva	(Switzerland) Martina Hingis (Czech Republic) Jana Novotná	6–3, 3–6, 8–6
Loss	1998	US Open	Hard	(Belarus) Natasha Zvereva	(Switzerland) Martina Hingis (Czech Republic) Jana Novotná	6–3, 6–3
Loss	1999	Australian Open (4)	Hard	(Belarus) Natasha Zvereva	(Switzerland) Martina Hingis (Russia) Anna Kournikova	7–5, 6–3
Win	1999	Wimbledon	Grass	(United States) Corina Morariu	(South Africa) Mariaan de Swardt (Ukraine) Elena Tatarkova	6–4, 6–4
Loss	2001	Australian Open (5)	Hard	(United States) Corina Morariu	(United States) Serena Williams (United States) Venus Williams	6–2, 2–6, 6–4
Loss	2005	Australian Open (6)	Hard	(United States) Corina Morariu	(Russia) Svetlana Kuznetsova (Australia) Alicia Molik	6–3, 6–4

== See also ==
- List of female tennis players
- List of Wimbledon ladies' singles champions
- List of Grand Slam women's singles champions

Sporting positions
Preceded by Martina Hingis; Martina Hingis; Martina Hingis; Martina Hingis; Jennifer Capriati; Amélie Mauresmo; Maria Sharapova; Maria Sharapova	World No. 1 October 12, 1998 – February 7, 1999; July 5, 1999 – August 8, 1999; April 3, 2000 – May 7, 2000; May 15, 2000 – May 21, 2000; November 5, 2001 – January 13, 2002; October 18, 2004 – August 21, 2005; August 29, 2005 – September 11, 2005; October 24, 2005 – January 29, 2006	Succeeded by Martina Hingis; Martina Hingis; Martina Hingis; Martina Hingis; Jennifer Capriati; Maria Sharapova; Maria Sharapova; Kim Clijsters
Preceded by First title	US Open Series Champion; 2004	Succeeded by Kim Clijsters
Awards and achievements
Preceded by Martina Hingis	ITF World Champion; 1998	Succeeded by Martina Hingis
Preceded by Martina Hingis	WTA Player of the year 1998–1999	Succeeded by Venus Williams
Preceded by Martina Hingis	WTA Comeback of the year 2007	Succeeded by Zheng Jie
