= Conchita Martínez =

Spanish tennis player (born 1972)

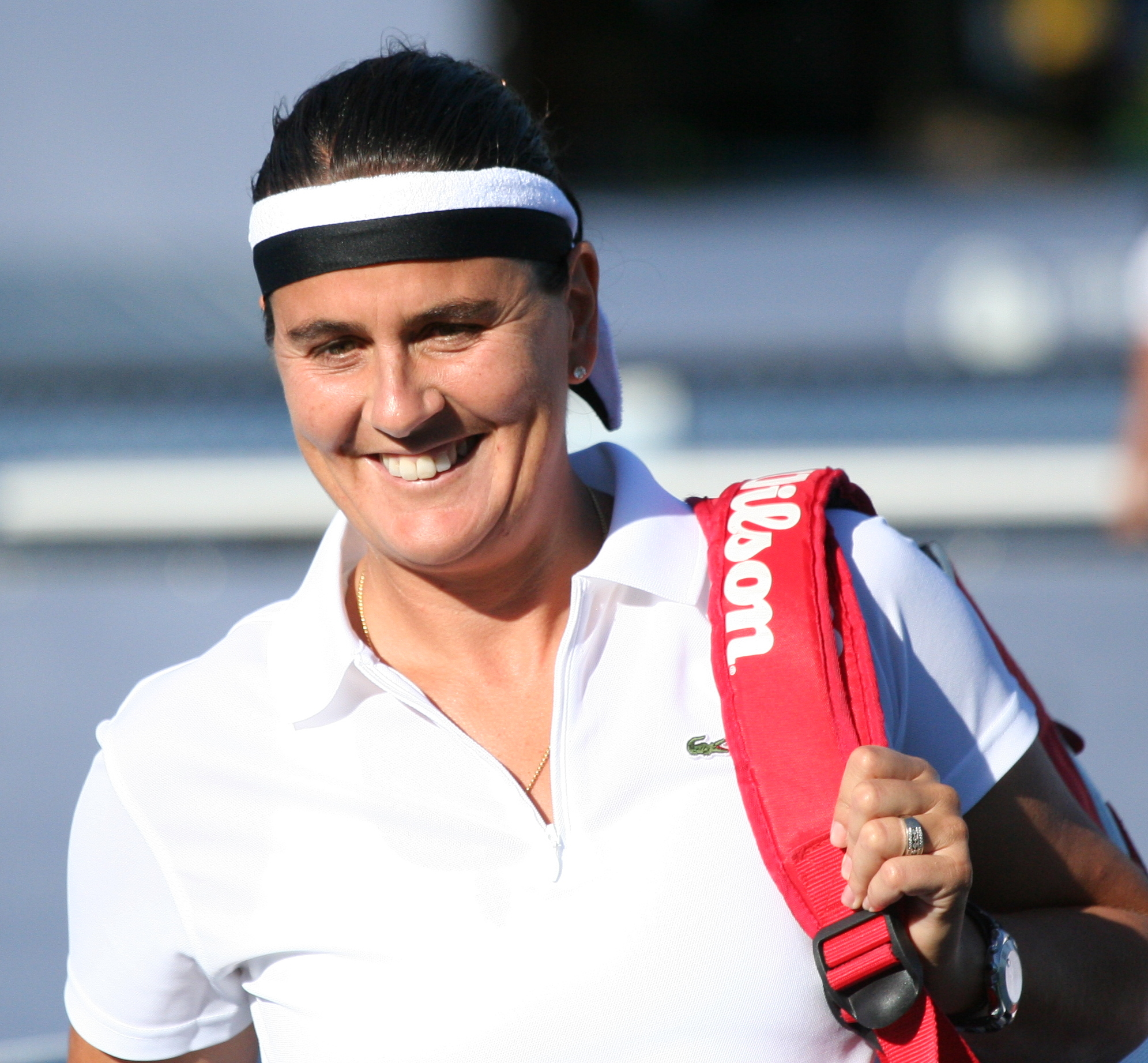
- Conchita Martínez at the 2010 US Open
- Full name: Inmaculada Concepción Martínez Bernat
- Country (sports): Spain
- Residence: Barcelona, Spain
- Born: 16 April 1972 (age 54) Monzón, Spain
- Height: 1.73 m (5 ft 8 in)
- Turned pro: February 1988
- Retired: 15 April 2006
- Plays: Right-handed (one-handed backhand)
- Prize money: $11,527,977
- Int. Tennis HoF: 2020 (member page)

Singles
- Career record: 739–297
- Career titles: 33
- Highest ranking: No. 2 (30 October 1995)

Grand Slam singles results
- Australian Open: F (1998)
- French Open: F (2000)
- Wimbledon: W (1994)
- US Open: SF (1995, 1996)

Other tournaments
- Grand Slam Cup: QF (1998)

Doubles
- Career record: 414–232
- Career titles: 13
- Highest ranking: No. 7 (11 January 1993)

Grand Slam doubles results
- Australian Open: SF (1998, 2002)
- French Open: F (1992, 2001)
- Wimbledon: QF (1995, 2003)
- US Open: SF (2005)

Team competitions
- Fed Cup: W (1991, 1993, 1994, 1995, 1998)

Coaching career
- Garbiñe Muguruza (2017–2018, 2020–2023); Karolína Plíšková (2018–2019); Mirra Andreeva (2024–)
Medal record
Olympic Games
Silver medal – second place	1992 Barcelona	Women's Doubles
Silver medal – second place	2004 Athens	Women's Doubles
Bronze medal – third place	1996 Atlanta	Women's Doubles
Mediterranean Games
Gold medal – first place	1987 Latakia	Women's Singles

Inmaculada Concepción "Conchita" Martínez Bernat (born 16 April 1972) is a Spanish former professional tennis player and current coach. She reached a career-high ranking of world No. 2 in October 1995, and was in the year-end top 10 for nine years. Martínez won 33 WTA Tour–level singles and 13 doubles titles, including a major at the 1994 Wimbledon Championships, as well as three Olympic medals. She also was the runner-up at the 1998 Australian Open and the 2000 French Open, and led Spain to five Billie Jean King Cup titles. Martínez was inducted into the International Tennis Hall of Fame in 2020.

Following her playing career, Martínez was the Spain Billie Jean King Cup captain from 2013 to 2017 as well as the Spanish Davis Cup team captain from 2015 to 2017, leading the latter team back into the top-tier World Group under her captaincy. She then served stints coaching Garbiñe Muguruza and Karolína Plíšková, guiding the former to the 2017 Wimbledon Championships title. Martínez won the 2021 WTA Coach of the Year award for her work coaching Muguruza. Since 2024, Martínez has been coaching Mirra Andreeva, guiding her to the 2026 French Open title.

== Career ==
=== 1988–1992: Breakthrough, top 10, Grand Slam quarterfinals ===
Born in Monzón in the Huesca, Aragon, Martínez turned professional in 1988. At the age of just 16, she reached the fourth round at the French Open in her third professional tournament. She upset ninth-seed Lori McNeil en route, before losing to Bettina Fulco in two sets. In 1989, her breakthrough year, Martínez defeated Gabriela Sabatini to win the title at Tampa and also won two Tier V tournaments (Wellington, Phoenix). She also reached the quarterfinals of the French Open, losing to Steffi Graf. She finished the year world No. 7. In 1990 and 1991, Martínez won a further six titles and again reached the quarterfinals at the French Open both years (losing to Graf in 1990 and Monica Seles in 1991).

The following year, Martínez was a silver medalist in doubles at the Olympic Games in Barcelona (partnering Arantxa Sánchez Vicario) and the runner-up in women's doubles at the French Open. Once again, Martínez was a quarterfinalist at the French Open, losing a tight match with Sabatini. In 1992, she was runner up in Indian Wells and San Diego.

=== 1993–1996: Highest ranking, Wimbledon singles title ===
In 1993, Martínez became the first Spanish woman since Lilí de Álvarez in 1928 to reach the semifinals at Wimbledon, where she lost to Steffi Graf in two sets. In November, Martínez defeated Graf for the first and only time in her career, at a tournament in Philadelphia in the final. At the Italian Open, Martínez defeated Sabatini in the final in straight sets to become the first Spaniard to win the tournament since de Álvarez in 1930. She again reached the quarterfinals at the French Open for the fifth year in a row, losing a 2-hour, 45-minute three-set battle with Anke Huber.

Martínez reached the Wimbledon singles final in 1994 beating Rene Simpson, Nana Smith, Nathalie Tauziat, Kristine Kunce and Lindsay Davenport in the quarterfinal and Lori McNeil in the semifinals where the third set went to 10–8, where she faced nine-time Wimbledon champion Martina Navratilova. Navratilova's last Wimbledon triumph had come four years earlier, but many observers felt that the 37-year-old Czech-born American was the favourite going into the match given her long track record of success on grass courts, whereas Martínez's most significant tournament victories up to that time had been on slower-playing surfaces, particularly on clay courts. Martínez, however, won the match in three sets and became the first Spanish woman to win Wimbledon. In 1995, Martínez was a semifinalist at all four Grand Slam tournaments and reached her career-high singles ranking of World No. 2. In the Australian Open, she beat Lindsay Davenport in the quarterfinals before losing to Mary Pierce in the semifinals. At Wimbledon, Martínez beat Sabatini in the quarterfinals before losing to Arantxa Sánchez Vicario in the semifinals. She also had a new coach that year, Carlos Kirmayr.

In 1996, Martínez became the only player to win the Italian Open singles title four consecutive years, after a straight-sets victory in the final against 15-year-old Martina Hingis. She also partnered Sánchez Vicario to claim a women's doubles Olympic bronze medal in Atlanta.

=== 1997–2006: Out of top 10 and return, Australian and French Open runner-up ===
In 1998, Martínez reached her second career Grand Slam singles final at the Australian Open. She beat Lindsay Davenport in the semifinals, before losing to Martina Hingis in the final in straight sets. At the German Open in May, she defeated Amélie Mauresmo to win her first singles title in 18 months. She also helped Spain win the Fed Cup that year, beating Patty Schnyder of Switzerland 6–3, 2–6, 9–7 in 3 hours, 19 minutes in the final.

In January 2000 at the Australian Open, Martínez beat Elena Likhovtseva in the quarterfinals after Likhovtseva twice failed to serve for the match to reach the semifinals where she was beaten by Martina Hingis. Martínez reached the final of the French Open in 2000, where she lost to Mary Pierce in two sets after beating Sánchez Vicario in the semifinals. She also won the German Open, beating Hingis in a semifinal and Amanda Coetzer in the final. In 2001, Martínez was a runner-up in the women's doubles at the French Open (partnering Jelena Dokic). Martínez also reached the quarterfinals at Wimbledon for the first time in six years but lost to Justine Henin of Belgium. In 2003, she reached her last Grand Slam quarterfinal in the French Open losing to Kim Clijsters. Also that year, she reached the final at Eastbourne losing to Chanda Rubin.

Martínez won her second Olympic silver medal in the women's doubles in 2004 in Athens, Greece (partnering Virginia Ruano Pascual). In 2005, Martínez won her first singles title in five years at Pattaya, Thailand. It was her last singles title, bringing her career total to 33 top-level singles titles, nine of which were Tier I events, and 13 doubles titles. On 15 April 2006, aged 33 and after 18 years of playing professionally, she announced her retirement. As of 2025, she is still the Spanish female player with the most singles titles so far.

=== 2008–2010 ===
In 2008, 2009 and 2010, Martínez played at Wimbledon in the Ladies Invitations Doubles. In 2010, her partner in doubles was Nathalie Tauziat.

== Coaching career ==
Martinez has been acclaimed for her coaching, having coached Garbiñe Muguruza during her win at Wimbledon in 2017. She was also Mirra Andreeva's coach for her win at the 2026 French Open.

== Playing style ==
Nicknamed Señorita Topspin, Martínez was a patient, right-handed baseline player who won matches by disrupting her opponents' rhythm through changes of spin, pace, depth, height, and angle. She had a strong backhand, played single-handedly, and used heavy topspin on her forehand and slower topspin and slice on her backhand. A characteristic shot of Martínez was to hit a deep, looping forehand with a lot of topspin with the intent to drive her opponent to the back of the court and make her hit the ball at shoulder height. She often sought out the ball with which she had won the previous point. This sometimes irritated her opponents; Patty Schnyder once pocketed the ball to prevent Martínez from retrieving it, and rejected the traditional handshake at the end of the match.

== Performance timelines ==
Key
W	F	SF	QF	#R	RR	Q#	DNQ	A	NH

(W) winner; (F) finalist; (SF) semifinalist; (QF) quarterfinalist; (#R) rounds 4, 3, 2, 1; (RR) round-robin stage; (Q#) qualification round; (DNQ) did not qualify; (A) absent; (NH) not held; (SR) strike rate (events won / competed); (W–L) win–loss record.

=== Singles ===
Tournament	1988	1989	1990	1991	1992	1993	1994	1995	1996	1997	1998	1999	2000	2001	2002	2003	2004	2005	Career SR
Grand Slam tournaments
Australian Open	A	2R	A	A	4R	4R	QF	SF	QF	4R	F	3R	SF	2R	2R	1R	1R	1R	0 / 15
French Open	4R	QF	QF	QF	QF	QF	SF	SF	SF	4R	4R	QF	F	3R	2R	QF	2R	1R	0 / 18
Wimbledon	A	A	A	A	2R	SF	W	SF	4R	3R	3R	3R	2R	QF	3R	3R	1R	3R	1 / 14
US Open	1R	4R	3R	QF	1R	4R	3R	SF	SF	3R	4R	4R	3R	A	2R	2R	1R	1R	0 / 17
SR	0 / 2	0 / 3	0 / 2	0 / 2	0 / 4	0 / 4	1 / 4	0 / 4	0 / 4	0 / 4	0 / 4	0 / 4	0 / 4	0 / 3	0 / 4	0 / 4	0 / 4	0 / 4	1 / 64
Year-end championships
WTA Tour Championships	A	1R	QF	1R	QF	QF	QF	QF	QF	1R	1R	1R	QF	A	A	A	A	A	0 / 12
Grand Slam Cup	Not held		Men's Only Event								QF	A	Not held						0 / 1
Career statistics
Tournaments won	1	3	3	3	1	5	4	6	2	0	2	1	1	0	0	0	0	1	33
Year-end ranking	40	7	11	9	8	4	3	2	5	12	8	15	5	35	34	18	42	32	N/A

=== Doubles ===
Tournament	1988	1989	1990	1991	1992	1993	1994	1995	1996	1997	1998	1999	2000	2001	2002	2003	2004	2005	SR	W–L
Australian Open	A	A	A	A	A	QF	3R	3R	3R	QF	SF	1R	2R	1R	SF	QF	3R	1R	0 / 13	26–13
French Open	A	A	3R	A	F	QF	1R	3R	3R	QF	QF	3R	QF	F	1R	1R	QF	3R	0 / 15	33–15
Wimbledon	A	A	A	A	2R	A	1R	QF	3R	1R	1R	2R	2R	3R	3R	QF	3R	3R	0 / 13	19–13
US Open	A	1R	A	2R	3R	A	3R	QF	3R	QF	1R	3R	QF	A	3R	QF	QF	SF	0 / 14	29–14
Win–loss	0–0	0–1	2–1	1–1	8–3	6–2	4–4	10–4	8–4	8–4	6–4	5–4	7–4	7–3	8–4	9–4	10–4	8–4	0 / 55	107–55
Year-end championships
Tour Championships	A	A	A	A	A	A	A	QF	A	QF	QF	QF	A	A	A	A	A	SF	0 / 5	0–5
Career statistics
Year-end ranking	147	67	106	51	8	10	41	17	28	19	16	24	29	19	16	21	14	9		

== See also ==
- Performance timelines for all female tennis players since 1978 who reached at least one Grand Slam final

Awards
Preceded by Carmen Acedo	Spanish Sportswoman of the Year; 1994	Succeeded by Taymi Chappé
