= Robert Lansdorp =

American tennis coach (1938–2024)

- Born: November 12, 1938; Semarang, Semarang Residency, Dutch East Indies
- Died: September 16, 2024 (aged 85); West Carson, California, U.S.
- Education: Pepperdine University (attended)
- Occupation: Tennis coach

Robert Herman Lansdorp (November 12, 1938 – September 16, 2024) was an American tennis coach known for working with top-ranked players including Tracy Austin, Pete Sampras, Lindsay Davenport, and Maria Sharapova. Lansdorp was regarded as an expert on groundstrokes, advocating a consistently powerful and flat hitting technique commonly referred to in the tennis world as the "Lansdorp Forehand".

== Life and career ==
Born in the Dutch East Indies (now Indonesia), Lansdorp eventually settled in California in 1960 with his family. He attended Pepperdine University and played on the tennis team until 1964, but did not graduate from the school. In February 1969, he married Denise Middlebrook and they subsequently divorced in 1971 after an affair was revealed.

He rose to international fame in 1979 when his student Tracy Austin became the youngest US Open Women's Singles champion in history at age 16. He later coached other pros including high-ranked Pete Sampras, Lindsay Davenport, Maria Sharapova, Eugenie Bouchard, and Julia Boserup.

Lansdorp received the USTA Lifetime Achievement Award in 2005 and was honored as a Team USA Coaching Legend along with Nick Bollettieri, Jerry Baskin and Jack Sharpe at the inaugural 2013 Team USA Coaching Legend reception in Indian Wells, California.

Lansdorp died on September 16, 2024 in West Carson, California, at the age of 85.

== Controversies ==
In 2004, Lansdorp said: "I’ve never received anything from one player. Not even a $500 gift. They’re all multi-millionaires but I’ve never received one thing. And I’m telling you, if Maria doesn’t put a Mercedes convertible in my driveway, I’m going to shoot myself."

In 2013, he publicly criticized the United States Tennis Association's Player Development program under General Manager Patrick McEnroe, saying the 2012 mandate requiring players under the age of ten to compete on miniature courts with lightweight green-dot balls is "wrong for the very talented kids." Sharapova, Monica Seles, and the Williams sisters, he noted, were very competitive with standard courts and equipment from age 7.
