= 1998 Australian Open =

- Date: 19 January – 1 February 1998
- Edition: 86th
- Category: Grand Slam (ITF)
- Surface: Hardcourt (Rebound Ace)
- Location: Melbourne, Australia
- Venue: Melbourne Park

Champions

Men's singles
- (Czech Republic) Petr Korda

Women's singles
- (Switzerland) Martina Hingis

Men's doubles
- (Sweden) Jonas Björkman / (Netherlands) Jacco Eltingh

Women's doubles
- (Switzerland) Martina Hingis / (Croatia) Mirjana Lučić

Mixed doubles
- (United States) Venus Williams / (United States) Justin Gimelstob

Boys' singles
- (France) Julien Jeanpierre

Girls' singles
- (Croatia) Jelena Kostanić

Boys' doubles
- (France) Jérôme Haehnel / (France) Julien Jeanpierre

Girls' doubles
- (Australia) Evie Dominikovic / (Australia) Alicia Molik
- Australian Open

The 1998 Australian Open was a tennis tournament played on outdoor hard courts at Melbourne Park in Melbourne in Victoria in Australia. It was the 86th edition of the Australian Open and was held from 19 January through 1 February 1998.

== Seniors ==
=== Men's singles ===
(Czech Republic) Petr Korda defeated (Chile) Marcelo Ríos 6–2, 6–2, 6–2

- It was Korda's only Grand Slam title.

=== Women's singles ===
(Switzerland) Martina Hingis defeated (Spain) Conchita Martínez 6–3, 6–3

- It was Hingis' 4th career Grand Slam title and her 2nd Australian Open title.

=== Men's doubles ===
(Sweden) Jonas Björkman / (Netherlands) Jacco Eltingh defeated (Australia) Todd Woodbridge / (Australia) Mark Woodforde 6–2, 5–7, 2–6, 6–4, 6–3

- It was Björkman's 1st career Grand Slam title and his 1st Australian Open title. It was Eltingh's 4th career Grand Slam title and his 2nd and last Australian Open title.

=== Women's doubles ===
(Switzerland) Martina Hingis / (Croatia) Mirjana Lučić (Note: Lučić became the first Croatian tennis player to win the Australian Open.) defeated (United States) Lindsay Davenport / (Belarus) Natasha Zvereva 6–4, 2–6, 6–3

- It was Hingis' 7th career Grand Slam title and her 4th Australian Open title. It was Lučić's only career Grand Slam title.

=== Mixed doubles ===
(United States) Venus Williams / (United States) Justin Gimelstob defeated (Czech Republic) Helena Suková / (Czech Republic) Cyril Suk 6–2, 6–1

- It was Williams' 1st career Grand Slam title and her 1st Australian Open title. It was Gimelstob's 1st career Grand Slam title and his only Australian Open title.

== Juniors ==
=== Boys' singles ===
(France) Julien Jeanpierre defeated (Sweden) Andreas Vinciguerra 4–6, 6–4, 6–3

=== Girls' singles ===
(Croatia) Jelena Kostanić defeated (Indonesia) Wynne Prakusya 6–0, 7–5

=== Boys' doubles ===
(France) Jérôme Haehnel / (France) Julien Jeanpierre defeated (Croatia) Mirko Pehar / (Croatia) Lovro Zovko 6–3, 6–3

=== Girls' doubles ===
(Australia) Evie Dominikovic / (Australia) Alicia Molik defeated (New Zealand) Leanne Baker / (New Zealand) Rewa Hudson 6–3, 3–6, 6–2

== Notes ==
Preceded by 1997 US Open	Grand Slams	Succeeded by 1998 French Open
