= 1993 French Open – Men's singles qualifying =

Men's singles qualifying
- 1993 French Open

Events
Singles	men	women		boys	girls
Doubles	men	women	mixed	boys	girls
WC Singles	men	women	quad
WC Doubles	men	women	quad
Legends	−45	45+	women

Qualification
Singles	men	women
- French Open

Players who neither had high enough rankings nor received wild cards to enter the main draw of the annual French Open Tennis Championships participated in a qualifying tournament held in the week before the event.

== Seeds ==
1. (Argentina) Horacio de la Peña (qualified)
2. (Australia) Jason Stoltenberg (first round)
3. (United States) Jared Palmer (second round)
4. (Spain) Jose-Francisco Altur (second round)
5. (South Africa) Grant Stafford (first round)
6. (Zimbabwe) Byron Black (qualifying competition)
7. (Argentina) Daniel Orsanic (second round)
8. (Australia) Neil Borwick (first round)
9. (Sweden) Jonas Björkman (first round)
10. (Argentina) Martin Stringari (qualifying competition)
11. (Czech Republic) David Rikl (qualifying competition)
12. (Germany) Jörn Renzenbrink (qualified)
13. (Germany) Patrick Baur (second round)
14. (Germany) Carsten Arriens (qualified)
15. (United States) Robbie Weiss (qualified)
16. (Belgium) Filip Dewulf (qualifying competition)
17. (Netherlands) Michiel Schapers (first round)
18. (Germany) Christian Saceanu (second round)
19. (Spain) Juan Gisbert Schultze (second round)
20. (Spain) Francisco Roig (first round)
21. (Germany) Arne Thoms (first round)
22. (United States) Chris Garner (second round)
23. (Italy) Stefano Pescosolido (qualified)
24. (United States) Jimmy Arias (second round)
25. (Italy) Laurence Tieleman (qualifying competition)
26. (Sweden) Tomas Nydahl (first round)
27. (Brazil) Fernando Meligeni (qualified)
28. (Italy) Andrea Gaudenzi (second round)
29. (Russia) Yevgeny Kafelnikov (qualified)
30. (United Kingdom) Chris Wilkinson (first round)
31. (Venezuela) Maurice Ruah (first round)
32. (Australia) Pat Rafter (qualifying competition)

== Qualifiers ==
1. (Argentina) Horacio de la Peña
2. (Peru) Alejandro Aramburu Acuna
3. (Russia) Yevgeny Kafelnikov
4. (Slovakia) Karol Kučera
5. (France) Pierre Bouteyre
6. (Brazil) Fernando Meligeni
7. (Hungary) József Krocskó
8. (United States) Brian Devening
9. (France) Frederic Vitoux
10. (Italy) Stefano Pescosolido
11. (Netherlands) Mark Koevermans
12. (Germany) Jörn Renzenbrink
13. (France) Stéphane Huet
14. (Germany) Carsten Arriens
15. (United States) Robbie Weiss
16. (Italy) Mario Visconti

== Qualifying draw ==
Key

- Q = Qualifier
- WC = Wild card
- LL = Lucky loser
- Alt = Alternate
- ITF = ITF entry
- PR = Protected ranking
- SR = Special ranking
- SE = Special exempt
- JE = Junior exempt
- JR = Junior Accelerator Programme entrant
- CO = College Accelerator Programme entrant
- NG = Next Gen Accelerator Program entrant
- w/o = Walkover
- r = Retired
- d = Defaulted

=== First qualifier ===
First round
1	(Argentina) Horacio de la Peña	6	6
(United Kingdom) Sean Cole	3	3
(Kenya) Paul Wekesa	4^{r}
(United Kingdom) Andrew Foster	2
WC	(France) Aloïs Beust	6	7
(Brazil) José Daher	0	5
(Slovakia) Marián Vajda	3	3
32	(Australia) Pat Rafter	6	6

Second round
1	(Argentina) Horacio de la Peña	6	6
(United Kingdom) Andrew Foster	4	2
WC	(France) Aloïs Beust	6	6	7
32	(Australia) Pat Rafter	7	1	9

Qualifying competition
1	(Argentina) Horacio de la Peña	4	6	6
32	(Australia) Pat Rafter	6	2	4

=== Second qualifier ===
First round
2	(Australia) Jason Stoltenberg	6	6	2
(Sweden) Patrik Albertsson	7	2	6
(Argentina) Pablo Albano	6	7
(Netherlands) Hendrik Jan Davids	1	6
WC	(France) Lionel Barthez	6	6
(Australia) Wayne Arthurs	4	0
(Peru) Alejandro Aramburu Acuna	7	6
31	(Venezuela) Maurice Ruah	5	2

Second round
(Sweden) Patrik Albertsson	6	6
(Argentina) Pablo Albano	2	2
WC	(France) Lionel Barthez	1	3
(Peru) Alejandro Aramburu Acuna	6	6

Qualifying competition
(Sweden) Patrik Albertsson	4	1
(Peru) Alejandro Aramburu Acuna	6	6

=== Third qualifier ===
First round
3	(United States) Jared Palmer	6	6	9
(Norway) Christian Ruud	7	4	7
(Czech Republic) Václav Roubíček	6	6
(Brazil) Roberto Jabali	3	4
(Germany) Florian Krumrey	6	6
(Argentina) Pablo Escribano	0	4
(Netherlands) Tom Nijssen	1	1
29	(Russia) Yevgeny Kafelnikov	6	6

Second round
3	(United States) Jared Palmer	3	3
(Czech Republic) Václav Roubíček	6	6
(Germany) Florian Krumrey	3	4
29	(Russia) Yevgeny Kafelnikov	6	6

Qualifying competition
(Czech Republic) Václav Roubíček	5	1
29	(Russia) Yevgeny Kafelnikov	7	6

=== Fourth qualifier ===
First round
4	(Spain) Jose-Francisco Altur	1	6	6
(Germany) Jörn Grunewald	6	2	3
(Spain) Jose-Antonio Conde	6	2	4
(Slovakia) Karol Kučera	4	6	6
(Sweden) Christer Allgårdh	5	6	6
(South Africa) Clinton Marsh	7	0	1
(Estonia) Andres Võsand	6	6
30	(United Kingdom) Chris Wilkinson	2	1

Second round
4	(Spain) Jose-Francisco Altur	6	6	3
(Slovakia) Karol Kučera	7	4	6
(Sweden) Christer Allgårdh	7	6
(Estonia) Andres Võsand	5	2

Qualifying competition
(Slovakia) Karol Kučera	6	6
(Sweden) Christer Allgårdh	1	2

=== Fifth qualifier ===
First round
5	(South Africa) Grant Stafford	7	2	1
(Germany) Peter Moraing	6	6	6
WC	(France) Pierre Bouteyre	7	6
(Spain) Daniel Marco	6	1
(France) Guillaume Marx	7	7
(United States) Todd Nelson	5	6
(France) Laurent Prades	4	3
28	(Italy) Andrea Gaudenzi	6	6

Second round
(Germany) Peter Moraing	6	4	4
WC	(France) Pierre Bouteyre	2	6	6
(France) Guillaume Marx	6	6
28	(Italy) Andrea Gaudenzi	4	2

Qualifying competition
WC	(France) Pierre Bouteyre	6	6
(France) Guillaume Marx	4	4

=== Sixth qualifier ===
First round
6	(Zimbabwe) Byron Black	6	6
(Belgium) Fabien Cousin	3	2
WC	(France) Sébastien Hette	6	3	6
(Sweden) Peter Lundgren	2	6	4
(Germany) Milan Palme	6	6
(Sweden) Thomas Högstedt	1	4
WC	(France) Antony Dupuis	4	2
27	(Brazil) Fernando Meligeni	6	6

Second round
6	(Zimbabwe) Byron Black	6	5	6
WC	(France) Sébastien Hette	3	7	0
(Germany) Milan Palme	2	4
27	(Brazil) Fernando Meligeni	6	6

Qualifying competition
6	(Zimbabwe) Byron Black	4	3
27	(Brazil) Fernando Meligeni	6	6

=== Seventh qualifier ===
First round
7	(Argentina) Daniel Orsanic	5
(Czech Republic) Jaroslav Bulant	0^{r}
(Hungary) József Krocskó	3	6	6
(Brazil) Cássio Motta	6	3	1
(Italy) Pietro Angelini	1	2
(United States) David Witt	6	6
(Australia) Carl Limberger	3	4
25	(Italy) Laurence Tieleman	6	6

Second round
7	(Argentina) Daniel Orsanic	2	6
(Hungary) József Krocskó	6	7
(United States) David Witt	6	3	4
25	(Italy) Laurence Tieleman	4	6	6

Qualifying competition
(Hungary) József Krocskó	6	6
25	(Italy) Laurence Tieleman	4	4

=== Eighth qualifier ===
First round
8	(Australia) Neil Borwick	3	6	8
(United States) Brian Devening	6	1	10
(Romania) Adrian Voinea	6
(Italy) Massimo Cierro	1^{r}
(Spain) Jordi Mas	2	3
(United States) David Kass	6	6
WC	(France) Stephane Grenier	6	6
26	(Sweden) Tomas Nydahl	4	1

Second round
(United States) Brian Devening	6	6
(Romania) Adrian Voinea	3	4
(United States) David Kass	3	3
WC	(France) Stephane Grenier	6	6

Qualifying competition
(United States) Brian Devening	6	6
WC	(France) Stephane Grenier	4	3

=== Ninth qualifier ===
First round
9	(Sweden) Jonas Björkman	6	5
(Germany) Alex Rădulescu	7	7
(France) Philippe Pech	4	4
Alt	(France) Bertrand Lemercier	6	6
WC	(France) Frederic Vitoux	6	6
(Sweden) Mikael Stadling	3	0
(Germany) Sascha Nensel	4	5
24	(United States) Jimmy Arias	6	7

Second round
(Germany) Alex Rădulescu	6	6
Alt	(France) Bertrand Lemercier	3	2
WC	(France) Frederic Vitoux	4	6	6
24	(United States) Jimmy Arias	6	2	2

Qualifying competition
(Germany) Alex Rădulescu	4	3
WC	(France) Frederic Vitoux	6	6

=== Tenth qualifier ===
First round
10	(Argentina) Martin Stringari	3	6	6
(Sweden) Niclas Kroon	6	0	3
(Spain) Alejo Mancisidor	6	7
(Germany) Stephan Rhode	4	6
(Germany) Dirk Dier	7	6	4
(France) Olivier Soules	6	7	6
(United States) Donald Johnson	1	7	3
23	(Italy) Stefano Pescosolido	6	6	6

Second round
10	(Argentina) Martin Stringari	6	6	6
(Spain) Alejo Mancisidor	4	7	1
(France) Olivier Soules	3	7	5
23	(Italy) Stefano Pescosolido	6	6	7

Qualifying competition
10	(Argentina) Martin Stringari	4	6	5
23	(Italy) Stefano Pescosolido	6	2	7

=== Eleventh qualifier ===
First round
11	(Czech Republic) David Rikl	7	6
(United States) Steve Bryan	5	4
(Czech Republic) Tomáš Anzari	6	6
(South Africa) Piet Norval	0	0
(Sweden) Mikael Tillström	4	2
(Netherlands) Mark Koevermans	6	6
(Argentina) Juan Garat	6	6
21	(Germany) Arne Thoms	0	2

Second round
11	(Czech Republic) David Rikl	4	6	7
(Czech Republic) Tomáš Anzari	6	4	5
(Netherlands) Mark Koevermans	6	1	7
(Argentina) Juan Garat	2	6	5

Qualifying competition
11	(Czech Republic) David Rikl	3	1
(Netherlands) Mark Koevermans	6	6

=== Twelfth qualifier ===
First round
12	(Germany) Jörn Renzenbrink	6	6
(Australia) John Fitzgerald	3	4
(Spain) Juan-Albert Viloca-Puig	6	6	6
(Australia) Paul Kilderry	4	7	2
(Sweden) Nicklas Utgren	6	4	5
(Italy) Francesco Michelotti	3	6	7
(India) Ramesh Krishnan	6	3	6
22	(United States) Chris Garner	4	6	8

Second round
12	(Germany) Jörn Renzenbrink	6	7
(Spain) Juan-Albert Viloca-Puig	3	5
(Italy) Francesco Michelotti	7	6
22	(United States) Chris Garner	6	4

Qualifying competition
12	(Germany) Jörn Renzenbrink	7	6
(Italy) Francesco Michelotti	5	3

=== Thirteenth qualifier ===
First round
13	(Germany) Patrick Baur	6	3	6
(Netherlands) Sander Groen	4	6	3
(South Africa) David Nainkin	7	3	6
(France) Serge Soulié	6	6	3
(South Africa) David Adams	2	4
(The Bahamas) Mark Knowles	6	6
(France) Stéphane Huet	6	6
20	(Spain) Francisco Roig	3	1

Second round
13	(Germany) Patrick Baur	1	6	2
(South Africa) David Nainkin	6	4	6
(The Bahamas) Mark Knowles	4	4
(France) Stéphane Huet	6	6

Qualifying competition
(South Africa) David Nainkin	7	3	6
(France) Stéphane Huet	6	6	8

=== Fourteenth qualifier ===
First round
14	(Germany) Carsten Arriens	7	7
(Sweden) Ola Kristiansson	5	5
(Spain) Tati Rascón	4	4
(Sweden) Jan Apell	6	6
(Israel) Michael Daniel	2	4
(Netherlands) Fernon Wibier	6	6
(Cuba) Mario Tabares	6	3
19	(Spain) Juan Gisbert Schultze	7	6

Second round
14	(Germany) Carsten Arriens	6	3	8
(Sweden) Jan Apell	1	6	6
(Netherlands) Fernon Wibier	1	6	11
19	(Spain) Juan Gisbert Schultze	6	4	9

Qualifying competition
14	(Germany) Carsten Arriens	7	6
(Netherlands) Fernon Wibier	6	2

=== Fifteenth qualifier ===
First round
15	(United States) Robbie Weiss	6	6
(United States) Martin Blackman	1	4
WC	(France) Éric Winogradsky	7	2	7
(Hungary) Sandor Noszaly	6	6	5
(Australia) Simon Youl	4	6	6
(Argentina) Roberto Saad	6	1	2
(India) Leander Paes	4	6	6
17	(Netherlands) Michiel Schapers	6	4	1

Second round
15	(United States) Robbie Weiss	6	6
WC	(France) Éric Winogradsky	2	0
(Australia) Simon Youl	4	7	6
(India) Leander Paes	6	6	4

Qualifying competition
15	(United States) Robbie Weiss	6	6
(Australia) Simon Youl	3	2

=== Sixteenth qualifier ===
First round
16	(Belgium) Filip Dewulf	6	6
(Spain) Álex Calatrava	4	4
(Colombia) Jaime Cortés	6	7
(Spain) Germán López	3	5
WC	(France) Tarik Benhabiles	4	6
(Italy) Mario Visconti	6	7
(South Africa) Kevin Ullyett	6	2	1
18	(Germany) Christian Saceanu	2	6	6

Second round
16	(Belgium) Filip Dewulf	6	6
(Colombia) Jaime Cortés	3	1
(Italy) Mario Visconti	7	6
18	(Germany) Christian Saceanu	5	2

Qualifying competition
16	(Belgium) Filip Dewulf	5	6	4
(Italy) Mario Visconti	7	2	6
