= 1993 Thriftway ATP Championships – Singles =

Singles
- 1993 Thriftway ATP Championships

Final
- Champion: (United States) Michael Chang
- Runner-up: (Sweden) Stefan Edberg
- Score: 7–5, 0–6, 6–4

Details
- Draw: 56 (3WC/7Q)
- Seeds: 16

Events
Singles	Doubles
← 1992 ·	Cincinnati Open	· 1994 →

Michael Chang defeated Stefan Edberg in the final, 7–5, 0–6, 6–4 to win the singles tennis title at the 1993 Cincinnati Masters.

Pete Sampras was the defending champion, but lost in the semifinals to Edberg.

== Seeds ==
1. (United States) Pete Sampras (semifinals)
2. (United States) Jim Courier (second round)
3. (Sweden) Stefan Edberg (final)
4. (Germany) Michael Stich (quarterfinals)
5. (United States) Ivan Lendl (second round)
6. (Czech Republic) Petr Korda (second round)
7. (United States) Michael Chang (champion)
8. (Netherlands) Richard Krajicek (second round)
9. (Croatia) Goran Ivanišević (first round, retired)
10. (Ukraine) Andrei Medvedev (third round)
11. (United States) Todd Martin (first round)
12. (Russia) Alexander Volkov (third round)
13. (France) Cédric Pioline (second round)
14. (South Africa) Wayne Ferreira (third round)
15. (United States) MaliVai Washington (second round)
16. (Sweden) Henrik Holm (second round)

== Draw ==
=== Key ===
- Q = Qualifier
- WC = Wild card
- LL = Lucky loser
- Alt = Alternate
- SE = Special exempt
- PR = Protected ranking
- ITF = ITF entry
- JE = Junior exempt
- w/o = Walkover
- r = Retired
- d = Defaulted
- SR = Special ranking

=== Finals ===
Semifinals
1	(United States) Pete Sampras	7^{7}	5	6^{5}
3	(Sweden) Stefan Edberg	6^{3}	7	7^{7}
(United States) Andre Agassi	5	6	5
7	(United States) Michael Chang	7	1	7

Final
3	(Sweden) Stefan Edberg	5	6	4
7	(United States) Michael Chang	7	0	6

=== Top half ===
==== Section 1 ====
First round
(United States) B Shelton	7^{10}	4	6
(France) G Raoux	6^{8}	6	1
(France) S Simian	4	6^{5}
(United States) A Krickstein	6	7^{7}
(Netherlands) J Eltingh	5	4
16	(Sweden) H Holm	7	6
10	(Ukraine) A Medvedev	6	6
Q	(India) L Paes	2	4
(Australia) W Masur	7^{7}	4	7^{7}
(United States) D Rostagno	6^{4}	6	6^{5}
(United States) J Stark	6^{4}	6^{4}
Q	(United States) S Bryan	7^{7}	7^{7}

Second round
1	(United States) P Sampras	7	6
(United States) B Shelton	5	2
(United States) A Krickstein	4	6	6
16	(Sweden) H Holm	6	3	0
10	(Ukraine) A Medvedev	6	6
(Australia) W Masur	3	4
Q	(United States) S Bryan	4	6	6
8	(Netherlands) R Krajicek	6	4	1

Third round
1	(United States) P Sampras	6	7
(United States) A Krickstein	2	5
10	(Ukraine) A Medvedev	3	6^{6}
Q	(United States) S Bryan	6	7^{8}

Quarterfinals
1	(United States) P Sampras	6	6
Q	(United States) S Bryan	4	0

==== Section 2 ====
First round
(Switzerland) J Hlasek	6	4	6
WC	(United States) R Weiss	4	6	0
(France) R Gilbert	7	4	0
(United States) J Tarango	5	6	6
(Denmark) K Carlsen	4	3
14	(South Africa) W Ferreira	6	6
12	(Russia) A Volkov	6	6^{3}	7
(Peru) J Yzaga	1	7^{7}	5
(Russia) A Cherkasov	6	6
(Sweden) A Järryd	4	0
(Russia) A Olhovskiy	7^{7}	4	6^{7}
(United States) B Gilbert	6^{3}	6	7^{9}

Second round
3	(Sweden) S Edberg	6	6
(Switzerland) J Hlasek	4	3
(United States) J Tarango	2	4
14	(South Africa) W Ferreira	6	6
12	(Russia) A Volkov	6	6
(Russia) A Cherkasov	3	3
(United States) B Gilbert	6	6
6	(Czech Republic) P Korda	3	4

Third round
3	(Sweden) S Edberg	6	6
14	(South Africa) W Ferreira	4	2
12	(Russia) A Volkov	6	2	2
(United States) B Gilbert	3	6	6

Quarterfinals
3	(Sweden) S Edberg	6	6
(United States) B Gilbert	4	2

=== Bottom half ===
==== Section 3 ====
First round
(Italy) G Pozzi	1	7^{8}	2
WC	(United States) D Flach	6	6^{6}	6
(United States) R Reneberg	6	7^{7}
Q	(Australia) S Stolle	3	6^{5}
(United States) A Agassi	6	6^{2}	6
11	(United States) T Martin	3	7^{7}	3
13	(France) C Pioline	6	6
(New Zealand) B Steven	3	3
(United States) A O'Brien	6^{4}	4
(Australia) M Woodforde	7^{7}	6
(United States) C Adams	3	1^{r}
(Israel) A Mansdorf	6	2

Second round
5	(United States) I Lendl	6^{4}	6	2
WC	(United States) D Flach	7^{7}	2	6
(United States) R Reneberg	3	2
(United States) A Agassi	6	6
13	(France) C Pioline	6^{4}	2
(Australia) M Woodforde	7^{7}	6
(Israel) A Mansdorf	2	3
4	(Germany) M Stich	6	6

Third round
WC	(United States) D Flach	5	1
(United States) A Agassi	7	6
(Australia) M Woodforde	3	3
4	(Germany) M Stich	6	6

Quarterfinals
(United States) A Agassi	6	6
4	(Germany) M Stich	3	2

==== Section 4 ====
First round
Q	(Australia) P Rafter	4	2
Q	(Canada) D Nestor	6	6
Q	(The Bahamas) M Knowles	6	1	6^{6}
(Australia) J Morgan	2	6	7^{8}
(Brazil) L Mattar	6	3
9	(Croatia) G Ivanišević	3	1^{r}
15	(United States) M Washington	6	6
WC	(Sweden) M Pernfors	4	2
(Netherlands) J Siemerink	6	6
Q	(Australia) G Doyle	3	2
(Australia) J Stoltenberg	6	7^{7}
(United States) D Wheaton	2	6^{5}

Second round
7	(United States) M Chang	6	7^{7}
Q	(Canada) D Nestor	3	6^{5}
(Australia) J Morgan	6	5	7^{7}
(Brazil) L Mattar	3	7	6^{3}
15	(United States) M Washington	4	4
(Netherlands) J Siemerink	6	6
(Australia) J Stoltenberg	3	6	6
2	(United States) J Courier	6	4	4

Third round
7	(United States) M Chang	6	7^{9}
(Australia) J Morgan	1	6^{7}
(Netherlands) J Siemerink	6^{1}	6	5
(Australia) J Stoltenberg	7^{7}	3	7

Quarterfinals
7	(United States) M Chang	7^{7}	5	6
(Australia) J Stoltenberg	6^{3}	7	3

== Qualifying ==
=== Qualifying seeds ===
1. (Sweden) Thomas Enqvist (first round)
2. (United States) Jared Palmer (first round)
3. (United States) Tommy Ho (first round)
4. (Germany) Markus Zoecke (first round)
5. (United Kingdom) Chris Wilkinson (second round)
6. (Italy) Cristiano Caratti (first round)
7. (Canada) Chris Pridham (qualifying competition)
8. (Australia) Patrick Rafter (qualified)
9. (Italy) Stefano Pescosolido (second round)
10. (United Kingdom) Jeremy Bates (first round)
11. (Italy) Diego Nargiso (first round)
12. (Australia) Sandon Stolle (qualified)
13. (United States) David Witt (qualifying competition)
14. (Canada) Sébastien Lareau (qualifying competition)

=== Qualifiers ===
1. (Australia) Sandon Stolle
2. (Canada) Daniel Nestor
3. (The Bahamas) Mark Knowles
4. (India) Leander Paes
5. (Australia) Grant Doyle
6. (Australia) Patrick Rafter
7. (United States) Steve Bryan

=== Qualifying draw ===
==== First qualifier ====
First round
1	(Sweden) Thomas Enqvist	4	2
(Italy) Nicola Bruno	6	6
(Indonesia) Lin Bing-chao	6	3	4
(United Kingdom) Ross Matheson	2	6	6
(Australia) Michael Tebbutt	0	4
(United States) Dave Randall	6	6
(Peru) José Luis Noriega	6	5
12	(Australia) Sandon Stolle	7	7

Second round
(Italy) Nicola Bruno	6	6
(United Kingdom) Ross Matheson	4	2
(United States) Dave Randall	3	2
12	(Australia) Sandon Stolle	6	6

Qualifying competition
(Italy) Nicola Bruno	4	2
12	(Australia) Sandon Stolle	6	6

==== Second qualifier ====
First round
2	(United States) Jared Palmer	6	7	3
(Canada) Daniel Nestor	7	6	6
(United States) Richard Schmidt	6	6
(France) Philippe Pech	3	4
(Australia) Wayne Arthurs	6	4
(South Africa) David Nainkin	7	6
(United States) Todd Nelson	6	1
13	(United States) David Witt	7	6

Second round
(Canada) Daniel Nestor	7	6
(United States) Richard Schmidt	6	4
(South Africa) David Nainkin	3	4
13	(United States) David Witt	6	6

Qualifying competition
(Canada) Daniel Nestor	7	1	6
13	(United States) David Witt	5	6	3

==== Third qualifier ====
First round
3	(United States) Tommy Ho	4	2
(The Bahamas) Mark Knowles	6	6
(Australia) John Fitzgerald	3	1
(Brazil) Fabio Silberberg	6	6
(Canada) Martin Laurendeau	6	6
(Ecuador) Pablo Campana	4	4
(Zimbabwe) Kevin Ullyett	5	1
14	(Canada) Sébastien Lareau	7	6

Second round
(The Bahamas) Mark Knowles	6	7
(Brazil) Fabio Silberberg	4	6
(Canada) Martin Laurendeau	6	6
14	(Canada) Sébastien Lareau	7	7

Qualifying competition
(The Bahamas) Mark Knowles	7	5	7
14	(Canada) Sébastien Lareau	5	7	6

==== Fourth qualifier ====
First round
4	(Germany) Markus Zoecke	4	5
(India) Leander Paes	6	7
(United States) Matt Lucena	6	6
(United States) Chris Garner	4	4
(United States) Kent Kinnear	2	7	7
(United States) Keith Evans	6	5	6
(United States) Todd Witsken	6	6
11	(Italy) Diego Nargiso	4	2

Second round
(India) Leander Paes	6	6	6
(United States) Matt Lucena	7	4	3
(United States) Kent Kinnear	6	3	6
(United States) Todd Witsken	4	6	7

Qualifying competition
(India) Leander Paes	4	6	6
(United States) Todd Witsken	6	3	2

==== Fifth qualifier ====
First round
5	(United Kingdom) Chris Wilkinson	6	6
(United States) Louis Gloria	4	3
(Australia) Grant Doyle	6	6
(Mexico) Agustín Moreno	1	3
(Australia) Heath Denman	6	6
(South Africa) Mark Kaplan	0	4
(Sweden) David Engel	6	6
10	(United Kingdom) Jeremy Bates	2	2

Second round
5	(United Kingdom) Chris Wilkinson	6	4
(Australia) Grant Doyle	7	6
(Australia) Heath Denman	2	6	4
(Sweden) David Engel	6	2	6

Qualifying competition
(Australia) Grant Doyle	7	6
(Sweden) David Engel	6	2

==== Sixth qualifier ====
First round
6	(Italy) Cristiano Caratti	6	6	5
(South Africa) Lan Bale	1	7	7
(United States) Jimmy Arias	2	6	2
(Sweden) Peter Lundgren	6	3	6
(Sweden) Niclas Kroon	6	6
(United States) Vince Spadea	3	4
(Sweden) Johan Carlsson	4	3
8	(Australia) Patrick Rafter	6	6

Second round
(South Africa) Lan Bale	2	7	6
(Sweden) Peter Lundgren	6	5	3
(Sweden) Niclas Kroon	2	4
8	(Australia) Patrick Rafter	6	6

Qualifying competition
(South Africa) Lan Bale	2	2
8	(Australia) Patrick Rafter	6	6

==== Seventh qualifier ====
First round
7	(Canada) Chris Pridham	6	6
(Germany) Axel Finnberg	4	3
(Belgium) Fabien Cousin	2	6	3
(United States) David Kass	6	3	6
(Brazil) Danilo Marcelino	2	4^{r}
(United States) Steve Bryan	6	3
WC	(United States) Curt Josselyn	6	0	3
9	(Italy) Stefano Pescosolido	4	6	6

Second round
7	(Canada) Chris Pridham	6	6
(United States) David Kass	2	2
(United States) Steve Bryan	7	6
9	(Italy) Stefano Pescosolido	5	1

Qualifying competition
7	(Canada) Chris Pridham	6	5
(United States) Steve Bryan	7	7
