= 1995 French Open – Men's singles qualifying =

Men's singles qualifying
- 1995 French Open

Events
Singles	men	women		boys	girls
Doubles	men	women	mixed	boys	girls
WC Singles	men	women	quad
WC Doubles	men	women	quad
Legends	−45	45+	women

Qualification
Singles	men	women
- French Open

Players who neither had high enough rankings nor received wild cards to enter the main draw of the annual French Open Tennis Championships participated in a qualifying tournament held in the week before the event.

== Seeds ==
1. (Netherlands) Sjeng Schalken (first round)
2. (Belgium) Kris Goossens (qualifying competition, lucky loser)
3. (United Kingdom) Mark Petchey (first round)
4. (Spain) Alex Lopez-Moron (qualifying competition, lucky loser)
5. (Japan) Shuzo Matsuoka (first round)
6. (Germany) Alexander Mronz (first round)
7. (Slovakia) Ján Krošlák (second round)
8. (United States) Alex O'Brien (first round)
9. (Sweden) Lars Jonsson (second round)
10. (Argentina) Hernán Gumy (qualified)
11. (Romania) Adrian Voinea (qualified)
12. (Germany) Carsten Arriens (qualified)
13. (Belgium) Filip Dewulf (qualifying competition)
14. (Spain) Alejo Mancisidor (second round)
15. (Spain) Juan-Albert Viloca-Puig (first round)
16. (Australia) Scott Draper (qualified)
17. (Haiti) Ronald Agénor (qualifying competition)
18. (Belgium) Johan Van Herck (qualified)
19. (Sweden) Mikael Tillström (qualified)
20. (Ukraine) Dimitri Poliakov (first round)
21. (Germany) Arne Thoms (second round)
22. (Sweden) Nicklas Kulti (qualifying competition)
23. (Italy) Stefano Pescosolido (second round)
24. (Germany) Patrick Baur (first round)
25. (Germany) Lars Burgsmüller (first round)
26. (Czech Republic) David Rikl (qualified)
27. (Italy) Laurence Tieleman (second round)
28. (Italy) Diego Nargiso (qualified)
29. (United States) David Witt (second round)
30. (Spain) Roberto Carretero (qualifying competition)
31. (Australia) Paul Kilderry (first round)
32. (Spain) Emilio Benfele Álvarez (qualified)

== Qualifiers ==
1. (Poland) Wojciech Kowalski
2. (Spain) Emilio Benfele Álvarez
3. (Sweden) Thomas Johansson
4. (France) Gérard Solvès
5. (Italy) Diego Nargiso
6. (United States) Donald Johnson
7. (Czech Republic) David Rikl
8. (Australia) Andrew Ilie
9. (France) Daniel Courcol
10. (Argentina) Hernán Gumy
11. (Romania) Adrian Voinea
12. (Germany) Carsten Arriens
13. (Morocco) Younes El Aynaoui
14. (Sweden) Mikael Tillström
15. (Belgium) Johan Van Herck
16. (Australia) Scott Draper

== Lucky losers ==
1. (Spain) Alex Lopez-Moron
2. (Belgium) Kris Goossens

== Qualifying draw ==
Key

- Q = Qualifier
- WC = Wild card
- LL = Lucky loser
- Alt = Alternate
- ITF = ITF entry
- PR = Protected ranking
- SR = Special ranking
- SE = Special exempt
- JE = Junior exempt
- JR = Junior Accelerator Programme entrant
- CO = College Accelerator Programme entrant
- NG = Next Gen Accelerator Program entrant
- w/o = Walkover
- r = Retired
- d = Defaulted

=== First qualifier ===
First round
1	(Netherlands) Sjeng Schalken	3	6^{5}
(Argentina) Daniel Orsanic	6	7^{7}
WC	(France) Olivier Soules	7	7^{13}
(Netherlands) Dennis van Scheppingen	5	6^{11}
(Sweden) Lars-Anders Wahlgren	3	1
(Poland) Wojciech Kowalski	6	6
(Germany) Torben Theine	3	7	6
31	(Australia) Paul Kilderry	6	5	4

Second round
(Argentina) Daniel Orsanic	7^{7}	6
WC	(France) Olivier Soules	6^{1}	4
(Poland) Wojciech Kowalski	4	6	7
(Germany) Torben Theine	6	2	5

Qualifying competition
(Argentina) Daniel Orsanic	2	3
(Poland) Wojciech Kowalski	6	6

=== Second qualifier ===
First round
2	(Belgium) Kris Goossens	7^{7}	6
(France) Antony Dupuis	6^{1}	3
(Argentina) Patricio Arnold	6	6
(United States) Kip Brady	2	2
(Argentina) Franco Squillari	4	4
(South Africa) David Nainkin	6	6
(Spain) Marcos Górriz	6	4	1
32	(Spain) Emilio Benfele Álvarez	4	6	6

Second round
2	(Belgium) Kris Goossens	6	1	6
(Argentina) Patricio Arnold	4	6	2
(South Africa) David Nainkin	6^{5}	4
32	(Spain) Emilio Benfele Álvarez	7^{7}	6

Qualifying competition
2	(Belgium) Kris Goossens	6^{6}	5
32	(Spain) Emilio Benfele Álvarez	7^{8}	7

=== Third qualifier ===
First round
3	(United Kingdom) Mark Petchey	7^{8}	5	4
(Australia) Neil Borwick	6^{6}	7	6
(Switzerland) Patrick Mohr	2	2
(Sweden) Thomas Johansson	6	6
(Italy) Filippo Messori	6	6
WC	(France) Stéphane Huet	1	1
WC	(France) Hervé Grenier	1	3
30	(Spain) Roberto Carretero	6	6

Second round
(Australia) Neil Borwick	4	1
(Sweden) Thomas Johansson	6	6
(Italy) Filippo Messori	1	3
30	(Spain) Roberto Carretero	6	6

Qualifying competition
(Sweden) Thomas Johansson	3	6	6
30	(Spain) Roberto Carretero	6	0	4

=== Fourth qualifier ===
First round
4	(Spain) Alex Lopez-Moron	6	6
(Australia) Grant Doyle	3	2
(France) Frédéric Fontang	6	7
(Spain) Ignacio Truyol-Turrion	1	5
(Russia) Andrey Cherkasov	3	2
(France) Gérard Solvès	6	6
(Australia) Brent Larkham	3	4
29	(United States) David Witt	6	6

Second round
4	(Spain) Alex Lopez-Moron	6	6
(France) Frédéric Fontang	1	3
(France) Gérard Solvès	6	3	6
29	(United States) David Witt	3	6	1

Qualifying competition
4	(Spain) Alex Lopez-Moron	5	2
(France) Gérard Solvès	7	6

=== Fifth qualifier ===
First round
5	(Japan) Shuzo Matsuoka	7	6^{3}	4
(Australia) Joshua Eagle	5	7^{7}	6
(Germany) Milan Palme	6	6
(France) Jérôme Hanquez	2	4
(Belgium) Fabien Cousin	1	1
(Germany) Christian Saceanu	6	6
(United States) Robbie Weiss	1	4
28	(Italy) Diego Nargiso	6	6

Second round
(Australia) Joshua Eagle	6^{2}	6^{7}
(Germany) Milan Palme	7^{7}	7^{9}
(Germany) Christian Saceanu	2	1
28	(Italy) Diego Nargiso	6	6

Qualifying competition
(Germany) Milan Palme	5	1
28	(Italy) Diego Nargiso	7	6

=== Sixth qualifier ===
First round
6	(Germany) Alexander Mronz	6	1	2
(France) Philippe Pech	4	6	6
(Sweden) Mikael Stadling	6	4	6
(United States) Louis Gloria	2	6	3
(United Kingdom) Ross Matheson	6^{4}	1
(United States) Donald Johnson	7^{7}	6
(France) Stéphane Sansoni	3	6^{5}
27	(Italy) Laurence Tieleman	6	7^{7}

Second round
(France) Philippe Pech	6	7^{7}
(Sweden) Mikael Stadling	4	6^{5}
(United States) Donald Johnson	6	7
27	(Italy) Laurence Tieleman	4	5

Qualifying competition
(France) Philippe Pech	4	4
(United States) Donald Johnson	6	6

=== Seventh qualifier ===
First round
7	(Slovakia) Ján Krošlák	6	6
WC	(France) Nicolas Escudé	2	3
(Belgium) Christophe Van Garsse	7^{7}	6
(Austria) Roland Burtscher	6^{4}	1
(United Kingdom) Miles Maclagan	6^{2}	3
(United Kingdom) Tim Henman	7^{7}	6
Alt	(Australia) James Sekulov	3	1
26	(Czech Republic) David Rikl	6	6

Second round
7	(Slovakia) Ján Krošlák	3	4
(Belgium) Christophe Van Garsse	6	6
(United Kingdom) Tim Henman	6	2	3
26	(Czech Republic) David Rikl	4	6	6

Qualifying competition
(Belgium) Christophe Van Garsse	4	3
26	(Czech Republic) David Rikl	6	6

=== Eighth qualifier ===
First round
8	(United States) Alex O'Brien	6	5	4
(Germany) Christian Vinck	3	7	6
(China) Pan Bing	6	1	4
(United States) Steve Bryan	3	6	6
(Argentina) Federico Browne	3	7^{7}	4
(Australia) Andrew Ilie	6	6^{5}	6
WC	(France) Guillaume Marx	7^{7}	7^{7}
25	(Germany) Lars Burgsmüller	6^{5}	6^{4}

Second round
(Germany) Christian Vinck	4	6	7
(United States) Steve Bryan	6	4	9
(Australia) Andrew Ilie	7^{7}	4	6
WC	(France) Guillaume Marx	6^{3}	6	2

Qualifying competition
(United States) Steve Bryan	3	2
(Australia) Andrew Ilie	6	6

=== Ninth qualifier ===
First round
9	(Sweden) Lars Jonsson	6	6
(South Africa) Clinton Marsh	1	2
WC	(France) Maxime Huard	7^{7}	6
(France) Pier Gauthier	6^{5}	3
(Austria) Thomas Gollwitzer	1	1
(France) Daniel Courcol	6	6
(Australia) Allen Belobrajdic	7^{7}	6
24	(Germany) Patrick Baur	6^{1}	3

Second round
9	(Sweden) Lars Jonsson	6	1	3
WC	(France) Maxime Huard	3	6	6
(France) Daniel Courcol	4	6	6
(Australia) Allen Belobrajdic	6	2	4

Qualifying competition
WC	(France) Maxime Huard	6	2	4
(France) Daniel Courcol	1	6	6

=== Tenth qualifier ===
First round
10	(Argentina) Hernán Gumy	6	6
(United Kingdom) Gary Henderson	2	2
(Brazil) Fabio Silberberg	5	2
(Spain) Juan-Carlos Baguena	7	6
(Morocco) Hicham Arazi	3	0
(Hungary) József Krocskó	6	6
(Australia) Peter Tramacchi	2	4
23	(Italy) Stefano Pescosolido	6	6

Second round
10	(Argentina) Hernán Gumy	7	6
(Spain) Juan-Carlos Baguena	5	2
(Hungary) József Krocskó	6	7
23	(Italy) Stefano Pescosolido	1	5

Qualifying competition
10	(Argentina) Hernán Gumy	7^{8}	6
(Hungary) József Krocskó	6^{6}	1

=== Eleventh qualifier ===
First round
11	(Romania) Adrian Voinea	6	6
(Australia) Todd Larkham	3	1
(France) Nicolas Kischkewitz	6	2	5
(France) Stéphane Matheu	2	6	7
(Germany) Michael Geserer	6	6
(United States) Kent Kinnear	2	4
(Sweden) Tomas Nydahl	2	1
22	(Sweden) Nicklas Kulti	6	6

Second round
11	(Romania) Adrian Voinea	6	6^{4}	11
(France) Stéphane Matheu	2	7^{7}	9
(Germany) Michael Geserer	2	2
22	(Sweden) Nicklas Kulti	6	6

Qualifying competition
11	(Romania) Adrian Voinea	7^{7}	2	6
22	(Sweden) Nicklas Kulti	6^{5}	6	2

=== Twelfth qualifier ===
First round
12	(Germany) Carsten Arriens	6	3	6
(Spain) Albert Portas	4	6	4
(The Bahamas) Mark Knowles	6	3	6
(France) Stéphane Simian	3	6	2
(Sweden) Ola Kristiansson	6	6
WC	(France) Aloïs Beust	3	0
(Italy) Massimo Ardinghi	5	2
21	(Germany) Arne Thoms	7	6

Second round
12	(Germany) Carsten Arriens	7	6
(The Bahamas) Mark Knowles	5	3
(Sweden) Ola Kristiansson	6	6
21	(Germany) Arne Thoms	2	1

Qualifying competition
12	(Germany) Carsten Arriens	0	6	6
(Sweden) Ola Kristiansson	6	2	1

=== Thirteenth qualifier ===
First round
13	(Belgium) Filip Dewulf	6	3	6
(Netherlands) Joost Winnink	2	6	4
(The Bahamas) Roger Smith	0	6	3
(United States) Doug Flach	6	3	6
(United Kingdom) Andrew Foster	4	7^{7}	3
(New Zealand) Steven Downs	6	6^{1}	6
(Morocco) Younes El Aynaoui	7	6
20	(Ukraine) Dimitri Poliakov	5	2

Second round
13	(Belgium) Filip Dewulf	6^{1}	6	6
(United States) Doug Flach	7^{7}	4	3
(New Zealand) Steven Downs	1	1
(Morocco) Younes El Aynaoui	6	6

Qualifying competition
13	(Belgium) Filip Dewulf	3	2
(Morocco) Younes El Aynaoui	6	6

=== Fourteenth qualifier ===
First round
14	(Spain) Alejo Mancisidor	3	6	6
(Canada) Andrew Sznajder	6	4	4
(Spain) Álex Calatrava	6	6
(United Kingdom) Colin Beecher	3	4
(Netherlands) Martijn Bok	6^{5}	4
(United States) Kenny Thorne	7^{7}	6
(South Korea) Kim Bong-soo	2	2
19	(Sweden) Mikael Tillström	6	6

Second round
14	(Spain) Alejo Mancisidor	7^{12}	4	5
(Spain) Álex Calatrava	6^{10}	6	7
(United States) Kenny Thorne	6	6^{4}	2
19	(Sweden) Mikael Tillström	4	7^{7}	6

Qualifying competition
(Spain) Álex Calatrava	5	3
19	(Sweden) Mikael Tillström	7	6

=== Fifteenth qualifier ===
First round
15	(Spain) Juan-Albert Viloca-Puig	6	3	1^{r}
(Sweden) Patrik Fredriksson	3	6	4
(Germany) Alex Rădulescu	6	6
(United States) Richard Matuszewski	3	4
WC	(France) Gilles Bastié	1	2
(United States) Brian MacPhie	6	6
(Italy) Marco Meneschincheri	0	2
18	(Belgium) Johan Van Herck	6	6

Second round
(Sweden) Patrik Fredriksson	5	4
(Germany) Alex Rădulescu	7	6
(United States) Brian MacPhie	6^{2}	1
18	(Belgium) Johan Van Herck	7^{7}	6

Qualifying competition
(Germany) Alex Rădulescu	4	6^{4}
18	(Belgium) Johan Van Herck	6	7^{7}

=== Sixteenth qualifier ===
First round
16	(Australia) Scott Draper	6	6
(Sweden) Robert Eriksson	3	4
WC	(France) Pierre Bouteyre	4	3
(Germany) Jens Knippschild	6	6
(Spain) Jose-Francisco Altur	5	7	6
(Argentina) Martin Rodriguez	7	5	3
(Mexico) Oscar Ortiz	3	3
17	(Haiti) Ronald Agénor	6	6

Second round
16	(Australia) Scott Draper	7	6
(Germany) Jens Knippschild	5	3
(Spain) Jose-Francisco Altur	1	6	3
17	(Haiti) Ronald Agénor	6	3	6

Qualifying competition
16	(Australia) Scott Draper	6	1	6
17	(Haiti) Ronald Agénor	3	6	3
