= 1994 U.S. Men's Clay Court Championships – Singles =

Singles
- 1994 U.S. Men's Clay Court Championships

Final
- Champion: (Australia) Jason Stoltenberg
- Runner-up: (Argentina) Gabriel Markus
- Score: 3–6, 6–3, 6–4

Details
- Draw: 32
- Seeds: 8

Events
Singles	Doubles
- U.S. Men's Clay Court Championships

Horacio de la Peña was the defending champion, but did not participate this year.

Jason Stoltenberg won the title, defeating Gabriel Markus 3–6, 6–3, 6–4 in the final.

== Seeds ==
A champion seed is indicated in bold text while text in italics indicates the round in which that seed was eliminated.

1. (United States) MaliVai Washington (first round)
2. (Sweden) Mikael Pernfors (first round)
3. (United States) Richey Reneberg (second round)
4. (Australia) **Jason Stoltenberg (champion)**
5. (Brazil) Luiz Mattar (first round)
6. (Netherlands) Jacco Eltingh (quarterfinals)
7. (South Africa) Grant Stafford (second round)
8. (United States) Bryan Shelton (second round)

== Draw ==
Key

- Q = Qualifier
- WC = Wild card
- LL = Lucky loser
- Alt = Alternate
- ITF = ITF entry
- PR = Protected ranking
- SR = Special ranking
- SE = Special exempt
- JE = Junior exempt
- JR = Junior Accelerator Programme entrant
- CO = College Accelerator Programme entrant
- NG = Next Gen Accelerator Program entrant
- w/o = Walkover
- r = Retired
- d = Defaulted

First round
1	(United States) M Washington	5	4
WC	(United States) **D Witt**	**7**	**6**
(Australia) B Larkham	4	3
WC	(Sweden) **M Wilander**	**6**	**6**
(Uruguay) **M Filippini**	**6**	**6**
(Colombia) M Hadad	0	4
(United States) R Weiss	3	4
8	(United States) **B Shelton**	**6**	**6**
4	(Australia) **J Stoltenberg**	**6**	**6**
(United States) A O'Brien	2	4
(Argentina) **A Mancini**	**6**	**6**
Q	(Argentina) M Stringari	3	3
Q	(Brazil) J Oncins	3	**6**	3
(United States) **S Bryan**	**6**	1	**6**
(Germany) H Dreekmann	6^{8}	**7^{7}**	3
6	(Netherlands) **J Eltingh**	**7^{10}**	6^{5}	**6**
5	(Brazil) L Mattar	3	5
(Argentina) **D Orsanic**	**6**	**7**
(United States) D Flach	**6**	6^{10}	6^{5}
(South Africa) **C van Rensburg**	1	**7^{12}**	**7^{7}**
(Argentina) **G Markus**	**7^{7}**	**6**
Q	(United States) J Arias	6^{4}	2
WC	(United States) C Woodruff	1	2
3	(United States) **R Reneberg**	**6**	**6**
7	(South Africa) **G Stafford**	2	**6**	**6**
(Chile) S Cortés	**6**	3	3
(Spain) **J F Altur**	**6**	**6**
(Venezuela) N Pereira	4	4
(United States) **J Palmer**	**6**	**6**
(Australia) T Woodbridge	4	4
Q	(Brazil) **R Jabali**	3	**6**	**6**
2	(Sweden) M Pernfors	**6**	0	3

Second round
WC	(United States) **D Witt**	**6**	4	**6**
WC	(Sweden) M Wilander	3	**6**	4
Q	(Uruguay) **M Filippini**	**6**	6^{2}	**7**
8	(United States) B Shelton	4	**7^{7}**	5
4	(Australia) **J Stoltenberg**	4	**6**	**7**
(Argentina) A Mancini	**6**	4	5
(United States) S Bryan	3	3
6	(Netherlands) **J Eltingh**	**6**	**6**
(Argentina) **D Orsanic**	**6**	**6**
(South Africa) C van Rensburg	4	2
(Argentina) **G Markus**	4	**6**	**7**
3	(United States) R Reneberg	**6**	1	5
7	(South Africa) G Stafford	3	**6**	2
(Spain) **J F Altur**	**6**	1	**6**
(United States) **J Palmer**	**6**	**6**
Q	(Brazil) R Jabali	2	0

Quarterfinals
WC	(United States) D Witt	3	5
(Uruguay) **M Filippini**	**6**	**7**
4	(Australia) **J Stoltenberg**	**6**	**6**
6	(Netherlands) J Eltingh	4	2
(Argentina) D Orsanic	3	0
(Argentina) **G Markus**	**6**	**6**
(Spain) J F Altur	3	1
(United States) **J Palmer**	**6**	**6**

Semifinals
(Uruguay) M Filippini	5	6^{2}
4	(Australia) **J Stoltenberg**	**7**	**7^{7}**
(Argentina) **G Markus**	**6**	**6**
(United States) J Palmer	4	4

Final
4	(Australia) **Jason Stoltenberg**	**6**	**6**
(Argentina) Gabriel Markus	3	4
