= Stefan Bojic =

Serbian tennis player (born 1990)

Stefan Bojic (born 20 March 1990) is a Serbian professional freestyle tennis player.

== Early career ==
Bojic won the U16 national championships in Serbia and was ranked No. 1 in the U18 Serbian national junior rankings. He also represented Serbia in the Junior Davis Cup for the U14 and U16 teams, playing alongside future ATP professionals Dušan Lajović and Filip Krajinović. Due to a lack of financial support, he enrolled in college tennis programs in the United States, competing for Radford University and St. John's University.

== Freestyle tennis career ==
In January 2015, Bojic transitioned into freestyle tennis, initially as a project before turning it into a professional career. His breakthrough came when he participated in a campaign for Head at the Indian Wells Masters. Since then, he has performed at major tournaments, including the Australian Open, Roland Garros, Wimbledon, US Open, Davis Cup, Miami Open, Madrid Open, and many others.

Bojic has worked with global brands to promote tennis, including Red Bull, Lacoste, Oppo, FedEx, Peugeot, Kia, and Head.

From 2017 to 2020, he conducted masterclasses in Saint Petersburg. In January 2020, he performed in Australia, and in February, he held trick-shot lessons at the Rafa Nadal Academy in Kuwait.
