= Eddleman Pro Tennis Classic =

Defunct tennis tournament
- Event name: Eddleman Pro Tennis Classic (1991–93); Eddleman USTA Tennis Classic (1995–96); Eddleman USTA Challenger (1997–2003)
- Founded: 1991
- Abolished: 2003
- Location: Birmingham, Alabama, United States
- Venue: Brook Highland Racquet Club
- Category: ATP Challenger Series
- Surface: Clay / Outdoor
- Draw: 32S/16D

The Eddleman Pro Tennis Classic was an ATP Challenger Tour tennis tournament played from 1991 until 2003. It was held at the Brook Highland Racquet Club in Birmingham, Alabama, United States, and was played on outdoor clay courts. The Eddleman U.S. Clay Court Championships took the place of the Challenger event in 1994.

== Results ==
=== Singles ===
Year	Champion	Runner-up	Score
1991	(Argentina) Marcelo Ingaramo	(Argentina) Gabriel Markus	3–6, 6–3, 6–2
1992	(Sweden) Mikael Pernfors	(Brazil) Luiz Mattar	7–6, 6–4
1993	(Sweden) Mikael Pernfors	(Switzerland) Claudio Mezzadri	7–6, 6–3
1994	No challenger event		
1995	(Czech Republic) Bohdan Ulihrach	(Czech Republic) Jiří Novák	6–4, 7–6
1996	(Argentina) Mariano Zabaleta	(United States) Bill Behrens	6–4, 6–4
1997	(Belgium) Johan Van Herck	(Germany) Tommy Haas	7–6, 6–7, 6–4
1998	(Norway) Christian Ruud	(Belgium) Johan Van Herck	2–6, 6–1, 6–1
1999	(Brazil) Francisco Costa	(Argentina) Martín Rodríguez	6–7, 7–6, 6–3
2000	(Haiti) Ronald Agénor	(Thailand) Paradorn Srichaphan	7–5, 6–3
2001	(Georgia (country)) Irakli Labadze	(United States) James Blake	6–2, 6–3
2002	(United States) Alex Kim	(United States) Cecil Mamiit	7–6^{(11–9)}, 6–2
2003	(Spain) Óscar Hernández	(United States) Alex Kim	6–2, 6–1

=== Doubles ===
Year	Champions	Runners-up	Score
1991	(United States) Mark Keil (United States) Dave Randall	(Brazil) Nelson Aerts (Brazil) Danilo Marcelino	1–6, 7–6, 6–2
1992	(United States) Bret Garnett (Sweden) Tobias Svantesson	(Sweden) Jan Apell (Sweden) Peter Nyborg	6–4, 7–6
1993	(United States) Bryan Shelton (United States) Todd Witsken	(Argentina) Pablo Albano (Argentina) Javier Frana	7–6, 6–3
1994	No challenger event		
1995	(United States) Ken Flach (United States) Bryan Shelton	(South Africa) Ellis Ferreira (South Africa) Brent Haygarth	5–7, 7–5, 6–2
1996	(Argentina) Javier Frana (Czech Republic) Karel Nováček	(United States) Matt Lucena (United States) Dave Randall	6–3, 6–1
1997	(United States) Luke Jensen (United States) Murphy Jensen	(Sweden) Fredrik Bergh (Sweden) Rikard Bergh	6–2, 7–6
1998	(United States) Doug Flach (United States) David Witt	(Israel) Eyal Erlich (United States) Eric Taino	7–6, 6–4
1999	(United States) Bob Bryan (United States) Mike Bryan	(United States) Geoff Grant (United States) T. J. Middleton	7–5, 6–3
2000	(Australia) Paul Kilderry (Australia) Peter Tramacchi	(Australia) Lee Pearson (Australia) Grant Silcock	6–4, 6–4
2001	(United States) James Blake (The Bahamas) Mark Merklein	(Paraguay) Ramón Delgado (Argentina) Ignacio Hirigoyen	7–5, 6–1
2002	(United States) Mardy Fish (United States) Jeff Morrison	(South Africa) Paul Rosner (United States) Glenn Weiner	6–4, 7–6^{(7–4)}
2003	(Brazil) Josh Goffi (United States) Travis Parrott	(United States) Paul Goldstein (United States) Robert Kendrick	6–4, 2–6, 6–2

== See also ==
- U.S. Men's Clay Court Championships
