= 1980 Japan Open Tennis Championships – Men's singles =

Men's singles
- 1980 Japan Open Tennis Championships

Final
- Champion: (Czechoslovakia) Ivan Lendl
- Runner-up: (United States) Eliot Teltscher
- Score: 3–6, 6–4, 6–0

Details
- Draw: 64 (8Q)
- Seeds: 16

Events
Singles	men	women
Doubles	men	women
- Japan Open

Terry Moor was the defending champion, but lost in the quarterfinals to Mel Purcell.

Ivan Lendl won the title, defeating Eliot Teltscher in the final, 3–6, 6–4, 6–0.

== Seeds ==
1. (Czechoslovakia) Ivan Lendl (champion)
2. (United States) Eliot Teltscher (final)
3. (United States) Mel Purcell (semifinals)
4. (United States) Pat DuPré (second round)
5. (United Kingdom) Buster Mottram (quarterfinals)
6. (United States) Terry Moor (quarterfinals)
7. (United States) Peter Rennert (quarterfinals)
8. (India) Ramesh Krishnan (third round)
9. (United States) Bruce Manson (quarterfinals)
10. (Zimbabwe) Haroon Ismail (first round)
11. (West Germany) Wolfgang Popp (third round)
12. (United States) Steve Krulevitz (second round)
13. (Netherlands) Louk Sanders (second round)
14. (United States) George Hardie (third round)
15. (France) Éric Deblicker (second round)
16. (Australia) Ross Case (third round)

== Draw ==
Key

- Q = Qualifier
- WC = Wild card
- LL = Lucky loser
- Alt = Alternate
- ITF = ITF entry
- PR = Protected ranking
- SR = Special ranking
- SE = Special exempt
- JE = Junior exempt
- JR = Junior Accelerator Programme entrant
- CO = College Accelerator Programme entrant
- NG = Next Gen Accelerator Program entrant
- w/o = Walkover
- r = Retired
- d = Defaulted

=== Finals ===
Quarterfinals
1	(Czechoslovakia) Ivan Lendl	7	6
7	(United States) Peter Rennert	5	3
3	(United States) Mel Purcell	6	6
6	(United States) Terry Moor	2	1
5	(United Kingdom) Buster Mottram	3	1
(Sweden) Jan Norbäck	6	0^{r}
9	(United States) Bruce Manson	3	3
2	(United States) Eliot Teltscher	6	6

Semifinals
1	(Czechoslovakia) Ivan Lendl	7	6
3	(United States) Mel Purcell	6	1
(Sweden) Jan Norbäck	3	1
2	(United States) Eliot Teltscher	6	6

Final
1	(Czechoslovakia) Ivan Lendl	3	6	6
2	(United States) Eliot Teltscher	6	4	0

=== Top half ===
==== Section 1 ====
First round
1	(Czechoslovakia) I Lendl	7	6
Q	(Belgium) T Stevaux	5	2
(United States) T Gullikson	6	7
(United States) L Stefanki	3	6
Q	(United States) L Bourne	6	6
Q	(Italy) M Alciati	4	3
(Japan) N Tamura	4	1
11	(West Germany) W Popp	6	6
12	(United States) S Krulevitz	6	1	6
(Australia) C Letcher	1	6	2
(Japan) J Kamiwazumi	6	4	7
(United States) J Delaney	2	6	6
(Australia) B Drewett	6	5	6
(Australia) A Gardiner	3	7	4
(Japan) S Sakamoto	1	2
7	(United States) P Rennert	6	6

Second round
1	(Czechoslovakia) I Lendl	6	6
(United States) T Gullikson	2	4
Q	(United States) L Bourne	2	7	2
11	(West Germany) W Popp	6	6	6
12	(United States) S Krulevitz	5	6	1
(Japan) J Kamiwazumi	7	4	6
(Australia) B Drewett	1	1
7	(United States) P Rennert	6	6

Third round
1	(Czechoslovakia) I Lendl	6	6
11	(West Germany) W Popp	3	4
(Japan) J Kamiwazumi	3	6
7	(United States) P Rennert	6	7

Quarterfinals
1	(Czechoslovakia) I Lendl	7	6
7	(United States) P Rennert	5	3

==== Section 2 ====
First round
3	(United States) M Purcell	6	6
(Austria) R Reininger	1	1
(Italy) F Meneschincheri	2	6	6
(Japan) T Kuramitsu	6	2	0
Q	(Sweden) J Gunnarsson	6	6
(United States) G Malin	3	4
(United States) J Bailey	3	2
14	(United States) G Hardie	6	6
15	(France) É Deblicker	6	6
(United States) J Whitlinger	4	4
(India) S Menon	7	6
(Chile) A Pierola	6	4
(Colombia) A Cortes	3	7	6
Q	(West Germany) P Spang	6	6	1
(Chile) J Fillol Sr.	2	3
6	(United States) T Moor	6	6

Second round
3	(United States) M Purcell	6	6
(Italy) F Meneschincheri	4	1
Q	(Sweden) J Gunnarsson	6	3	3
14	(United States) G Hardie	3	6	6
15	(France) É Deblicker	1	3
(India) S Menon	6	6
(Colombia) A Cortes	1	5
6	(United States) T Moor	6	7

Third round
3	(United States) M Purcell	6	2	7
14	(United States) G Hardie	4	6	5
(India) S Menon	2	4
6	(United States) T Moor	6	6

Quarterfinals
3	(United States) M Purcell	6	6
6	(United States) T Moor	2	1

=== Bottom half ===
==== Section 3 ====
First round
5	(United Kingdom) B Mottram	3	6	6
(United Kingdom) R Lewis	6	0	1
(West Germany) A Maurer	7	7
Q	(West Germany) F Settelmeyer	5	5
(Belgium) B Boileau	3	6	7
(Switzerland) M Günthardt	6	1	6
(United States) A Kohlberg	6	3
13	(Netherlands) L Sanders	7	6
10	(Zimbabwe) H Ismail	6	1	2
(Japan) T Fukui	4	6	6
(United States) B Kleege	6	7
(Mexico) E Montaño	1	6
(Sweden) J Norbäck	6	6
Q	(Philippines) B Sisson	3	1
(United States) T Graham	3	6
4	(United States) P DuPré	6	7

Second round
5	(United Kingdom) B Mottram	6	6	7
(West Germany) A Maurer	7	4	6
(Belgium) B Boileau	6	7
13	(Netherlands) L Sanders	2	6
(Japan) T Fukui	6	7	7
(United States) B Kleege	7	5	6
(Sweden) J Norbäck	7	6
4	(United States) P DuPré	6	3

Third round
5	(United Kingdom) B Mottram	6	6
(Belgium) B Boileau	3	0
(Japan) T Fukui	1	2
(Sweden) J Norbäck	6	6

Quarterfinals
5	(United Kingdom) B Mottram	3	1
(Sweden) J Norbäck	6	0^{r}

==== Section 4 ====
First round
8	(India) R Krishnan	7	3	6
(Bolivia) R Benavides	6	6	0
(United States) M Cahill	6	6
(Japan) K Tanabe	1	3
(United States) M Mitchell	7	7
(West Germany) W Zirngibl	5	6
(Austria) H Stiegler	1	1
9	(United States) B Manson	6	6
16	(Australia) R Case	6	6
(Japan) J Kuki	4	2
(France) P Proisy	6	4	6
Q	(Austria) B Pils	2	6	3
(Japan) S Nishio	6	6
(Japan) E Uchiyama	4	2
(United States) J Cohen	2	1
2	(United States) E Teltscher	6	6

Second round
8	(India) R Krishnan	6	6	7
(United States) M Cahill	7	4	5
(United States) M Mitchell	1	1
9	(United States) B Manson	6	6
16	(Australia) R Case	6	2	6
(France) P Proisy	3	6	3
(Japan) S Nishio	2	3
2	(United States) E Teltscher	6	6

Third round
8	(India) R Krishnan	3	3
9	(United States) B Manson	6	6
16	(Australia) R Case	4	1
2	(United States) E Teltscher	6	6

Quarterfinals
9	(United States) B Manson	3	3
2	(United States) E Teltscher	6	6
