= 1980 Japan Open Tennis Championships – Men's doubles =

Men's doubles
- 1980 Japan Open Tennis Championships

Final
- Champion: (Australia) Ross Case; (Chile) Jaime Fillol
- Runner-up: (United States) Terry Moor; (United States) Eliot Teltscher
- Score: 6–3, 3–6, 6–4

Details
- Draw: 32
- Seeds: 4

Events
Singles	men	women
Doubles	men	women
- Japan Open

Colin Dibley and Pat DuPré were the defending champions, although Dibley did not participate this year. DuPré partnered with Bruce Manson as the first seeds to defend his title, but they lost in the semifinals.

Ross Case and Jaime Fillol won the title, defeating Terry Moor and Eliot Teltscher in the final, 6–3, 3–6, 6–4.

== Seeds ==
1. (United States) Pat DuPré / (United States) Bruce Manson (semifinals)
2. (United States) Terry Moor / (United States) Eliot Teltscher (final)
3. (Australia) Ross Case / (Chile) Jaime Fillol (champions)
4. (United States) Mike Cahill / (United Kingdom) Buster Mottram (second round)

== Draw ==
Key

- Q = Qualifier
- WC = Wild card
- LL = Lucky loser
- Alt = Alternate
- ITF = ITF entry
- PR = Protected ranking
- SR = Special ranking
- SE = Special exempt
- JE = Junior exempt
- JR = Junior Accelerator Programme entrant
- CO = College Accelerator Programme entrant
- NG = Next Gen Accelerator Program entrant
- w/o = Walkover
- r = Retired
- d = Defaulted

=== Finals ===
Semifinals
1	(United States) Pat DuPré (United States) Bruce Manson	3	5
3	(Australia) Ross Case (Chile) Jaime Fillol	6	7
(United States) Jeremy Cohen (Philippines) Beeyong Sison	5	4
2	(United States) Terry Moor (United States) Eliot Teltscher	7	6

Final
3	(Australia) Ross Case (Chile) Jaime Fillol	6	3	6
2	(United States) Terry Moor (United States) Eliot Teltscher	3	6	4

=== Top half ===
First round
1	(United States) P DuPré (United States) B Manson	6	6
(Japan) S Kato (Japan) S Shiraishi	3	1
(United States) A Kohlberg (United States) M Purcell	6	6	5
(India) R Krishnan (United States) G Malin	0	7	7
(Italy) M Alciati (Italy) F Meneschincheri	1	2
(Japan) T Fukui (Japan) J Kamiwazumi	6	6
(Colombia) A Cortes (Netherlands) L Sanders	4	4
(United States) S Krulevitz (United States) P Rennert	6	6
3	(Australia) R Case (Chile) J Fillol Sr.	6	6
(Belgium) B Boileau (Belgium) A Brichant	1	4
(Japan) T Kuramitsu (Japan) K Tanabe	7	6
(Japan) T Kanai (Japan) T Yamamoto	5	1
(Japan) K Hirai (Japan) N Tamura	4	6
(United States) J Bailey (Sweden) J Norbäck	6	7
(Australia) B Drewett (United States) L Stefanki	6	6	6
(United States) J Delaney (India) S Menon	3	7	3

Second round
1	(United States) P DuPré (United States) B Manson	6	6
(India) R Krishnan (United States) G Malin	2	2
(Japan) T Fukui (Japan) J Kamiwazumi	3	7	4
(United States) S Krulevitz (United States) P Rennert	6	6	6
3	(Australia) R Case (Chile) J Fillol Sr.	6	6
(Japan) T Kuramitsu (Japan) K Tanabe	1	2
(United States) J Bailey (Sweden) J Norbäck	7	7
(Australia) B Drewett (United States) L Stefanki	6	6

Quarterfinals
1	(United States) P DuPré (United States) B Manson	6	6
(United States) S Krulevitz (United States) P Rennert	3	2
3	(Australia) R Case (Chile) J Fillol Sr.	2	6	6
(United States) J Bailey (Sweden) J Norbäck	6	4	2

Semifinals
1	(United States) P DuPré (United States) B Manson	3	5
3	(Australia) R Case (Chile) J Fillol Sr.	6	7

=== Bottom half ===
First round
(United States) T Gullikson (United States) G Hardie	6	6
(United Kingdom) R Lewis (Australia) C Letcher	1	2
(France) É Deblicker (France) P Proisy	6	6
(United States) L Bourne (Austria) R Reininger	2	4
(United States) T Graham (United States) M Mitchell	3	6	1
(United States) J Cohen (Philippines) B Sison	6	3	6
(Japan) S Nishio (Japan) S Sakamoto	5	6
4	(United States) M Cahill (United Kingdom) B Mottram	7	7
(Mexico) E Montaño (United States) J Whitlinger	7	6
(United States) Z Guerry (Zimbabwe) H Ismail	5	1
(Bolivia) R Benavides (Chile) A Pierola	4	3
(Australia) A Gardiner (United States) B Kleege	6	6
(West Germany) A Maurer (West Germany) W Popp	7	6
(Austria) B Pils (Austria) H Stiegler	5	4
(Switzerland) M Günthardt (West Germany) W Zirngibl	4	7	3
2	(United States) T Moor (United States) E Teltscher	6	6	6

Second round
(United States) T Gullikson (United States) G Hardie	w/o
(France) É Deblicker (France) P Proisy
(United States) J Cohen (Philippines) B Sison	4	6	6
4	(United States) M Cahill (United Kingdom) B Mottram	6	2	3
(Mexico) E Montaño (United States) J Whitlinger	6	6
(Australia) A Gardiner (United States) B Kleege	4	2
(West Germany) A Maurer (West Germany) W Popp	3	3
2	(United States) T Moor (United States) E Teltscher	6	6

Quarterfinals
(United States) T Gullikson (United States) G Hardie	6	6	6
(United States) J Cohen (Philippines) B Sison	7	4	7
(Mexico) E Montaño (United States) J Whitlinger	4	7	3
2	(United States) T Moor (United States) E Teltscher	6	6	6

Semifinals
(United States) J Cohen (Philippines) B Sison	5	4
2	(United States) T Moor (United States) E Teltscher	7	6
