= 1994 U.S. Men's Clay Court Championships – Doubles =

Doubles
- 1994 U.S. Men's Clay Court Championships

Final
- Champions: (United States) Richey Reneberg (South Africa) Christo van Rensburg
- Runners-up: (United States) Brian MacPhie (United States) David Witt
- Score: 2–6, 6–3, 6–2

Details
- Draw: 16
- Seeds: 4

Events
Singles	Doubles
- U.S. Men's Clay Court Championships

Fourth-seeded pair Richey Reneberg and Christo van Rensburg won the title, defeating Brian MacPhie and David Witt in the final.

== Seeds ==
Champion seeds are indicated in bold text while text in italics indicates the round in which those seeds were eliminated.

1. (United States) Jared Palmer / (Australia) Todd Woodbridge (semifinals)
2. (United States) Doug Flach / (United States) Ken Flach (first round)
3. (United States) Brian Devening / (United States) Bryan Shelton (quarterfinals)
4. **(United States) Richey Reneberg / (South Africa) Christo van Rensburg (champions)**

== Draw ==
Key

- Q = Qualifier
- WC = Wild card
- LL = Lucky loser
- Alt = Alternate
- ITF = ITF entry
- PR = Protected ranking
- SR = Special ranking
- SE = Special exempt
- JE = Junior exempt
- JR = Junior Accelerator Programme entrant
- CO = College Accelerator Programme entrant
- NG = Next Gen Accelerator Program entrant
- w/o = Walkover
- r = Retired
- d = Defaulted

First round
1	**(United States) J Palmer** **(Australia) T Woodbridge**	**6**	6	**6**
WC	(Sweden) M Pernfors (Sweden) M Wilander	4	**7**	4
(South Africa) R Deppe (United States) J Sullivan	2	3
Q	**(South Africa) L Bale** **(South Africa) G Stafford**	**6**	**6**
4	**(United States) R Reneberg** **(South Africa) C van Rensburg**	**6**	**6**
(Argentina) P Albano (Venezuela) N Pereira	3	4
**(South Africa) B Haygarth** **(South Africa) S Kruger**	**6**	**6**
(United States) B Garnett (United States) TJ Middleton	4	4
WC	**(United States) B MacPhie** **(United States) D Witt**	**6**	4	**6**
(Netherlands) J Eltingh (Australia) J Stoltenberg	4	**6**	4
(Brazil) L Mattar (Brazil) J Oncins	3	1
3	**(United States) B Devening** **(United States) B Shelton**	**6**	**6**
(United States) M Briggs (United States) T Kronemann	2	2
**(South Africa) E Ferreira** **(United States) D Randall**	**6**	**6**
**(United States) P Annacone** **(United States) A O'Brien**	**6**	4	**6**
2	(United States) D Flach (United States) K Flach	3	**6**	2

Quarterfinals
1	**(United States) J Palmer** **(Australia) T Woodbridge**	**6**	1	**7**
Q	(South Africa) L Bale (South Africa) G Stafford	3	**6**	6
4	**(United States) R Reneberg** **(South Africa) C van Rensburg**	**6**	**6**
(South Africa) B Haygarth (South Africa) S Kruger	2	4
WC	**(United States) B MacPhie** **(United States) D Witt**	**6**	**6**
3	(United States) B Devening (United States) B Shelton	3	1
**(South Africa) E Ferreira** **(United States) D Randall**	4	**6**	**7**
(United States) P Annacone (United States) A O'Brien	**6**	4	6

Semifinals
1	(United States) J Palmer (Australia) T Woodbridge	4	4
4	**(United States) R Reneberg** **(South Africa) C van Rensburg**	**6**	**6**
WC	**(United States) B MacPhie** **(United States) D Witt**	**6**	**7**
(South Africa) E Ferreira (United States) D Randall	4	6

Final
4	**(United States) R Reneberg** **(South Africa) C van Rensburg**	2	**6**	**6**
WC	(United States) B MacPhie (United States) D Witt	**6**	3	2
