= 1980 Japan Open Tennis Championships =

- Date: 20–26 October
- Edition: 7th
- Surface: Clay / outdoor
- Location: Tokyo, Japan
- Venue: Denen Tennis Club

Champions

Men's singles
- (Czechoslovakia) Ivan Lendl

Women's singles
- (Romania) Mariana Simionescu

Men's doubles
- (Chile) Jaime Fillol / (Australia) Ross Case

Women's doubles
- (United States) Dana Gilbert / (United States) Mareen Louie
- Japan Open

The 1980 Japan Open Tennis Championships (also known as the Hit-Union Japan & Asia Open Tennis Championships for sponsorship reasons) was a tennis tournament played on outdoor clay courts at the Denen Tennis Club in Tokyo, Japan. It was part of the 1980 Volvo Grand Prix and of the 1980 Colgate Series. The tournament ran from 20 October through 26 October 1980. Ivan Lendl and Mariana Simionescu won the singles titles.

== Finals ==
=== Men's singles ===
(Czechoslovakia) Ivan Lendl defeated (United States) Eliot Teltscher, 3–6, 6–4, 6–0

- It was Lendl's 5th title of the year and the 5th of his career.

=== Women's singles ===
(Romania) Mariana Simionescu defeated (Australia) Nerida Gregory, 6–4, 6–4

- It was the only singles title of Simionescu's career.

=== Men's doubles ===
(Chile) Jaime Fillol / (Australia) Ross Case defeated (United States) Terry Moor / (United States) Eliot Teltscher, 6–3, 3–6, 6–4

- It was Fillol's 3rd title of the year and the 14th of his career. It was Case's 2nd title of the year and the 20th of his career.

=== Women's doubles ===
(United States) Dana Gilbert / (United States) Mareen Louie defeated (Australia) Nerida Gregory / (Hungary) Marie Pinterová, 7–5, 7–6

- It was the only doubles title of Gilbert's career. It was the 1st title of Louie's career.
