= Sébastien Hette =

French tennis player

- Country (sports): France
- Born: 9 June 1972 (age 52)

Singles
- Career record: 0–1
- Highest ranking: No. 379 (8 March 1993)

Grand Slam singles results
- Australian Open: Q1 (1994)
- French Open: Q2 (1993)

Sébastien Hette (born 9 June 1972) is a French former professional tennis player.

A French Junior Davis Cup representative, Hette competed on the professional tour in the 1990s and had a best singles world ranking of 379. He featured in qualifying draws at the Australian Open and French Open. His only ATP Tour main draw appearance came in 1994 at the Jakarta Open, as a lucky loser from qualifying.

Hette now runs a retrogaming business called Reset XP. He was previously employed by the French Tennis Federation as the Operational Director of Davis Cup and Fed Cup events.
