= 1994 U.S. Men's Clay Court Championships =

- Date: April 11–18
- Edition: 26th
- Category: World Series
- Draw: 32S / 16D
- Prize money: $288,350
- Surface: Clay / outdoor
- Location: Birmingham, Alabama, U.S.

Champions

Singles
- (Australia) Jason Stoltenberg

Doubles
- (United States) Richey Reneberg / (South Africa) Christo van Rensburg
- U.S. Men's Clay Court Championships

The 1994 U.S. Men's Clay Court Championships was an Association of Tennis Professionals men's tennis tournament held in Birmingham, Alabama in the United States and played on outdoor clay courts. It was the 26th edition of the tournament and was held from April 11 to April 18, 1994. Fourth-seeded Jason Stoltenberg won the singles title.

== Finals ==
=== Singles ===
(Australia) Jason Stoltenberg defeated (Argentina) Gabriel Markus 6–3, 6–4

- It was Stoltenberg's only title of the year and the 7th of his career.

=== Doubles ===
(United States) Richey Reneberg / (South Africa) Christo van Rensburg defeated (United States) Brian MacPhie / (United States) David Witt 2–6, 6–3, 6–2

- It was Reneberg's 2nd title of the year and the 14th of his career. It was van Rensburg's only title of the year and the 19th of his career.
