= Marco Meneschincheri =

Italian tennis player

- Full name: Marco Meneschincheri
- Country (sports): Italy
- Born: 25 April 1972 (age 52); Rome, Italy
- Height: 1.80 m (5 ft 11 in)
- Turned pro: 1990
- Plays: Left-handed
- Prize money: $208,940

Singles
- Career record: 2–12
- Career titles: 0; 1 Challenger, 0 Futures
- Highest ranking: No. 131 (2 February 1998)

Grand Slam singles results
- Australian Open: Q1 (1998)
- French Open: Q2 (1998)
- Wimbledon: Q1 (2001)
- US Open: Q1 (1992, 1997)

Doubles
- Career record: 0–2
- Career titles: 0; 0 Challenger, 0 Futures
- Highest ranking: No. 464 (16 May 1994)
- Last updated on: 9 September 2022.

Marco Meneschincheri (born 25 April 1972) is a former professional tennis player from Italy.

== Biography ==
=== Career ===
Born in Rome, Meneschincheri began playing tennis professionally in 1990.

He played mostly on the Challenger circuit and won a title in the Uruguayan city of Punta del Este in 1997, despite suffering an injury scare earlier in the tournament in an unusual incident. During his second round encounter against Cecil Mamiit, the Italian was hit in the head by a billboard which had blown towards him and was forced to go to hospital after losing consciousness. The match was suspended but later resumed after he was given the all clear.

In 1998 he reached his highest career ranking, 131 in the world.

His ATP Tour main draw appearances include two top-tier (now known as Masters) tournaments in 1999, the German Open in Hamburg and Italian Open, making the second round of the former.

He is now involved with Italian television channel SuperTennis, for which he contributes as a commentator.

=== Personal life ===
Meneschincheri holds a degree in political science from the University of Rome.

With wife Roberta he has a son who was born in 2014. He has two brothers who are both doctors, including former professional tennis player Famiano.

== ATP Challenger and ITF Futures finals ==
=== Singles: 3 (1–2) ===
Legend ATP Challenger (1–2) ITF Futures (0–0)	Finals by surface Hard (0–1) Clay (1–1) Grass (0–0) Carpet (0–0)

Result	W–L	Date	Tournament	Tier	Surface	Opponent	Score
Loss	0–1	Aug 1994	Belo Horizonte, Brazil	Challenger	Hard	(Brazil) Fabio Silberberg	6–7, 3–6
Win	1–1	Feb 1997	Punta del Este, Uruguay	Challenger	Clay	(Costa Rica) Juan Antonio Marín	6–7, 6–1, 6–4
Loss	1–2	Jun 1998	Eisenach, Germany	Challenger	Clay	(Netherlands) Edwin Kempes	6–7, 3–6

== Performance timeline ==
Key
W	F	SF	QF	#R	RR	Q#	DNQ	A	NH

(W) winner; (F) finalist; (SF) semifinalist; (QF) quarterfinalist; (#R) rounds 4, 3, 2, 1; (RR) round-robin stage; (Q#) qualification round; (DNQ) did not qualify; (A) absent; (NH) not held; (SR) strike rate (events won / competed); (W–L) win–loss record.

=== Singles ===
Tournament	1992	1993	1994	1995	1996	1997	1998	1999	2000	2001	SR	W–L	Win %
Grand Slam tournaments
Australian Open	A	A	A	A	A	A	Q1	A	A	A	0 / 0	0–0	–
French Open	A	A	A	Q1	A	A	Q2	Q1	Q1	Q1	0 / 0	0–0	–
Wimbledon	A	A	A	A	A	A	A	A	A	Q1	0 / 0	0–0	–
US Open	Q1	A	A	A	A	Q1	A	A	A	A	0 / 0	0–0	–
Win–loss	0–0	0–0	0–0	0–0	0–0	0–0	0–0	0–0	0–0	0–0	0 / 0	0–0	–
ATP Masters Series
Miami	A	A	A	A	A	A	Q1	A	A	A	0 / 0	0–0	–
Monte Carlo	A	A	Q2	A	A	Q2	A	A	A	A	0 / 0	0–0	–
Hamburg	A	A	A	Q1	A	A	A	2R	A	A	0 / 1	1–1	50%
Rome	A	Q1	Q2	Q2	Q3	A	Q1	1R	A	Q1	0 / 1	0–1	0%
Paris	A	A	A	A	A	A	Q1	A	A	A	0 / 0	0–0	–
Win–loss	0–0	0–0	0–0	0–0	0–0	0–0	0–0	1–2	0–0	0–0	0 / 2	1–2	33%
