= Junior Davis Cup and Junior Billie Jean King Cup =

Team events in junior tennis

Junior Davis Cup
- Current season, competition or edition: 2025 Junior Davis Cup
- Sport: Tennis
- Founded: 1985; 41 years ago
- Founder: Dwight F. Davis
- Countries: ITF member nations
- Continent: Worldwide
- Most recent champions: United States (5th title)
- Most titles: Australia; Spain (6 titles)
- Website: Junior Davis Cup

Junior Billie Jean King Cup
- Current season, competition or edition: 2025 Junior Billie Jean King Cup
- Sport: Tennis
- Founded: 1985; 41 years ago
- Founder: Dwight F. Davis
- Countries: ITF member nations
- Continent: Worldwide
- Most recent champions: United States (10th title)
- Most titles: United States (10 titles)
- Website: Junior Billie Jean King Cup

Junior Davis Cup and Junior Billie Jean King Cup, the World Cup of tennis in junior level, are the international team events in junior tennis (16-and-under age category).

== History ==
=== U16 ===
Competitions were launched by the ITF in 1985 as the 16-and-under World Youth Cup, and rebranded in 2002 under the current names.

Format: Each year nations enter regional qualifying events with the winners progressing to the Finals, where they compete to be crowned champion.

The senior equivalents of the Junior Davis Cup and Junior Billie Jean King Cup are the Davis Cup and Billie Jean King Cup, respectively.

=== U14 ===
- es:Copa Mundial de Tenis Juvenil (U14) Since 1991.

== Winners ==
=== Junior Davis Cup ===
Year	Host city	Champion	Score	Runner-up	Third place	Score	Fourth place
1985	(Japan) Kobe	Australia; Shane Barr; Richard Fromberg; Jason Stoltenberg	2–1	United States; John Falbo; Francisco Montana; Jim Courier**	Soviet Union; Andrei Cherkasov; Dato Kacharava; Vladimir Petrushenko	2–1	Venezuela; Juan Carlos Bianchi; Nicolás Pereira; Franz Sydow
1986	(Japan) Tokyo	Australia; Richard Fromberg; Jason Stoltenberg; Todd Woodbridge	2–1	United States; Michael Chang; Jim Courier; David Kass	Sweden; Kim Andersson; Nicklas Kulti; Magnus Larsson	3–0	Brazil; Walmir Bandeira; Marcus Barbosa; Jaime Oncins
1987	(West Germany) Freiburg im Breisgau	Australia; Johan Anderson; Jamie Morgan; Todd Woodbridge	3–0	Netherlands; Paul Dogger; Fernon Wibier; Richard Krajicek**	Sweden; Ola Kristiansson; Nicklas Kulti	2–1	France; Dominique Durand; Sébastien Hette; Fabrice Santoro
1988	(Australia) Perth	Czechoslovakia; Martin Damm; Lukáš Hovorka; Jan Kodeš Jr.	2–1	United States; William Bull; Rick Leach; Brian MacPhie	Chile; Marcelo Achondo; Ernesto Díaz; Miguel Ocampo	2–1	Yugoslavia; Saša Hiršzon; Srđan Muškatirović; Blaž Trupej
1989	(Paraguay) Asunción	West Germany; Scott Gessner; Gregor Paul; David Prinosil	2–1	Czechoslovakia; Pavel Gazda; Lukáš Thomas; René Hanák**	Soviet Union; Andrei Medvedev; Sergei Pospelov; Sargis Sargsian	2–1	Sweden; Thomas Enqvist; Patrik Fredriksson; Richard Wernerhjelm
1990	(Netherlands) Rotterdam	Soviet Union; Yevgeni Kafelnikov; Andriy Medvedev; Dmitri Tomashevich	2–1	Australia; Grant Doyle; Brad Sceney; Anastasios Vasiliadis	Sweden; Thomas Enqvist; Thomas Johansson	3–0	Spain; Àlex Corretja; Jairo Velasco Jr.
1991	(Spain) Barcelona	Spain; Gonzalo Corrales; Albert Costa	2–1	Czechoslovakia; Filip Kaščák; David Škoch	Germany; Lars Rehmann; Christian Tambue; Christian Vinck	2–1	United States; Jason Appel; Jimmy Jackson; Eric Taino
1992	(Spain) Castelldefels	France; Maxime Boyé; Nicolas Escudé	2–1	Germany; Alexander Nickel; Rene Nicklisch; Axel Pretzsch**	Sweden; Kalle Flygt; Magnus Norman; Anders Stenman	2–1	Brazil; Gustavo Kuerten; Fernando Prestes; Antônio Wuttke
1993	(New Zealand) Wellington	France; Jean-François Bachelot; Olivier Mutis; Johann Potron	2–1	New Zealand; Scott Clark; Mark Nielsen; Teo Susnjak	Sweden; Thomas Axelsson; Fredrik Jonsson; Nicklas Timfjord	2–1	South Korea; Chung Kyung-won; Kim Dong-hyun; Kwon Oh-hee
1994	(United States) Tucson	Netherlands; Raemon Sluiter; Peter Wessels	2–1	Austria; Markus Hipfl; Clemens Trimmel; Ingo Neumüller**	United States; Geoff Abrams; Kevin Kim; Michael Russell	3–0	Italy; Daniele Bracciali; Andrea Capodimonte; Matteo Gotti
1995	(Germany) Essen	Germany; Daniel Elsner; Thomas Messmer; Tomas Zivnicek	3–0	Czech Republic; Petr Kralert; Pavel Říha; Michal Tabara	Sweden; Joel Christensen; Kristofer Stahlberg; Mats Norin	2–1	United States; Brandon Hawk; Michael Lang; Rudy Rake
1996	(Switzerland) Zürich	France; Jérôme Haehnel; Julien Jeanpierre; Olivier Patience	2–1	Australia; Nathan Healey; Lleyton Hewitt; Glenn Knox**	Slovakia; František Babej; Miloslav Grolmus	2–1	Chile; Carlos González; Fernando González; Luis Hormazábal
1997	(Canada) Vancouver	Czech Republic; Ladislav Chramosta; Jaroslav Levinský; Tomáš Cakl*	2–0	Venezuela; José de Armas; Ezequiel Nastari; Luis Aguerrevere**	Great Britain; Simon Dickson; Mark Hilton; Alan Mackin	2–0	United States; Lesley Joseph; Scott Lipsky; David Martin
1998	(Italy) Cuneo	Spain; Marc López; Tommy Robredo; David Ferrer*	2–1	Croatia; Roko Karanušić; Mario Radić	Russia; Sergei Pozdnev; Dmitry Vlasov; Mikhail Youzhny	2–1	France; Julien Cassaigne; Nicolas Mahut; Julien Maigret
1999	(Australia) Perth	United States; Alex Bogomolov; Ryan Redondo; Travis Rettenmaier	3–0	Croatia; Mario Ančić; Tomislav Perić; Ivan Stelko	Czech Republic; Jan Hájek; Dušan Karol; Michal Kokta	2–1	Russia; Pavel Ivanov; Philipp Mukhometov; Dmitri Sitak
2000	(Japan) Hiroshima	Australia; Ryan Henry; Todd Reid; Raphael Durek*	2–0	Austria; Johannes Ager; Stefan Wiespeiner; Christian Polessnig**	Sweden; Christian Johansson; Michael Ryderstedt; Robin Söderling	2–1	Poland; Adam Chadaj; Pawel Dilaj; Michał Przysiężny
2001	(Chile) Santiago	Chile; Jorge Aguilar; Guillermo Hormazábal; Carlos Ríos	3–0	Germany; Sascha Klör; Bastian Koch; Marcel Zimmermann	Argentina; Martín Alund; Leandro Migani; Luis Moreschi	2–1	Portugal; Filipe Farinha; Fred Gil; Peter Rodrigues
2002	(France) La Baule-Escoublac	Spain; Marcel Granollers; Rafael Nadal; Tomeu Salvá	3–0	United States; Brendan Evans; Scott Oudsema; Phillip Simmonds	Uruguay; Pablo Cuevas; Diego Ksiazenicki; Federico Sansonetti	2–1	Australia; Lachlan Ferguson; Joel Kerley; Alexander Petropoulos
2003	(Germany) Essen	Germany; Matthias Bachinger; Mischa Zverev; Aljoscha Thron*	2–1	France; Jérémy Chardy; Mathieu Dehaine; Jérémy Dréan	Venezuela; Piero Luisi; David Navarrete; Enrique Olivares	2–1	United States; Alex Kuznetsov; Timothy Neilly; Michael Shabaz
2004	(Spain) Barcelona	Spain; Roberto Bautista; Pere Riba; Javier Garrapiz*	2–1	Czech Republic; Dušan Lojda; Miroslav Navrátil; Filip Zeman	Russia; Pavel Chekhov; Artur Chernov; Valery Rudnev	2–1	Croatia; Marin Čilić; Jurica Grubišić; Mikhail Karpol
2005	(Spain) Barcelona	France; Kevin Botti; Jérôme Inzerillo; Stéphane Piro*	2–0	Czech Republic; Michal Konečný; Roman Jebavý; Jiří Košler**	Ecuador; Patrick Alvarado; Gonzalo Escobar; Juan Martín Paredes	2–1	Italy; Thomas Fabbiano; Matteo Trevisan; Andrea Volpini
2006	(Spain) Barcelona	Netherlands; Xander Spong; Tim van Terheijden; Joost Vogel*	2–1	Russia; Evgeny Donskoy; Vladimir Karusevich; Vladimir Zinyakov	Brazil; Henrique Cunha; Fabrício Neis; Andre Stabile	2–0	Chile; Matías Bobadilla; Guillermo Nicol; Cristóbal Saavedra Corvalán
2007	(Italy) Reggio Emilia	Australia; Bernard Tomic; Mark Verryth; Alex Sanders*	2–0	Argentina; Guido Andreozzi; Kevin Konfederak; Nicolás Pastor**	Chinese Taipei; Chen Chung-su; Hsieh Cheng-peng; Yang Tsung-Hua	2–1	Brazil; Idio Escobar; Bernardo Lipschitz; Aires José Pereira
2008	(Mexico) San Luis Potosí	United States; Evan King; Denis Kudla; Raymond Sarmiento*	2–0	Argentina; Andrea Collarini; Agustín Velotti; Facundo Argüello**	Russia; Mikhail Biryukov; Alexander Kostanov; Richard Muzaev	2–1	India; Yuki Bhambri; Venkata Abhishek Sakleshpur; Saurabh Singh
2009	(Mexico) San Luis Potosí	Australia; Jason Kubler; Luke Saville; Joey Swaysland	2–1	Great Britain; Andrew Bettles; George Morgan	Czech Republic; Robert Rumler; Jiří Veselý; Lukáš Vrňák	3–0	France; Cédrick Commin; Mathias Bourgue; Mick Lescure
2010	(Mexico) San Luis Potosí	Japan; Kazuma Kawachi; Kaichi Uchida; Soichiro Moritani*	2–0	Canada; Edward Nguyen; Filip Peliwo; Samuel Monette**	France; Grégoire Barrère; Mathias Bourgue; Laurent Lokoli	2–1	Great Britain; Luke Bambridge; Kyle Edmund; Evan Hoyt
2011	(Mexico) San Luis Potosí	Great Britain; Kyle Edmund; Evan Hoyt; Luke Bambridge*	2–0	Italy; Stefano Napolitano; Gianluigi Quinzi; Matteo Donati**	France; Alexandre Favrot; Quentin Halys; Johan Tatlot	2–0	South Africa; Daniel Theodorus Ferreira; Wayne Montgomery; Matthew Rossouw
2012	(Spain) Barcelona	Italy; Filippo Baldi; Gianluigi Quinzi; Mirko Cutuli*	2–1	Australia; Harry Bourchier; Thanasi Kokkinakis; Blake Mott**	United States; Jared Donaldson; Stefan Kozlov; Noah Rubin	2–0	France; Benjamin Bonzi; Quentin Halys; Johan Tatlot
2013	(Mexico) San Luis Potosí	Spain; Pedro Martínez; Jaume Munar; Álvaro López San Martín*	2–1	South Korea; Chung Yun-seong; Hong Seong-chan; Kang Ku-keon	Australia; Oliver Anderson; Marc Polmans; Akira Santillan	2–0	Germany; Fabian Fallert; Tim Sandkaulen; Alexander Zverev
2014	(Mexico) San Luis Potosí	United States; William Blumberg; Michael Mmoh; Gianni Ross	3–0	South Korea; Chung Yun-seong; Im Seong-taek; Oh Chan-yeong	France; Geoffrey Blancaneaux; Ugo Humbert; Corentin Moutet	2–1	Japan; Shohei Chikami; Riki Oshima; Renta Tokuda
2015	(Spain) Madrid	Canada; Félix Auger-Aliassime; Denis Shapovalov; Benjamin Sigouin*	2–1	Germany; Nicola Kuhn; Marvin Möller; Maximilian Todorov**	Russia; Alen Avidzba; Artem Dubrivnyy; Mikhail Sokolovskiy	3–0	Japan; Toru Horie; Yuta Shimizu; Yunosuke Tanaka
2016	(Hungary) Budapest	Russia; Alen Avidzba; Timofey Skatov; Alexey Zakharov	2–1	Canada; Félix Auger-Aliassime; Nicaise Muamba; Chih-Chi Huang	Argentina; Sebastián Báez; Tomás Descarrega; Thiago Agustín Tirante	2–1	United States; Sebastian Korda; Keenan Mayo; Sangeet Sridhar
2017	(Hungary) Budapest	Czech Republic; Jonáš Forejtek; Dalibor Svrčina; Andrew Paulson*	2–0	United States; William Grant; Govind Nanda; Tyler Zink**	Argentina; Juan Manuel Cerúndolo; Alejo Lorenzo Lingua Lavallén; Thiago Agustín Tirante	2–0	Croatia; Duje Ajduković; Admir Kalender; Roko Horvat
2018	(Hungary) Budapest	Spain; Carlos Alcaraz; Mario González; Pablo Llamas	2–1	France; Martin Breysach; Lilian Mamousez; Harold Mayot	Argentina; Román Andrés Burruchaga; Santiago de la Fuente; Juan Bautista Torres	2–1	Italy; Flavio Cobolli; Lorenzo Musetti; Luca Nardi
2019	(United States) Orlando	Japan; Kokoro Isomura; Shintaro Mochizuki; Yamato Sueoka	2–1	United States; Toby Kodat; Martin Damm; Dali Blanch**	Serbia; Hamad Međedović; Stefan Popović; Petar Teodorović	2–0	France; Giovanni Mpetshi Perricard; Mehdi Sadaoui; Max Westphal
2020	Not held due to the COVID-19 pandemic	—N/a	—N/a	—N/a	—N/a	—N/a	—N/a
2021	(Turkey) Antalya	Russia; Yaroslav Demin; Maxim Zhukov; Danil Panarin*	2–0	France; Gabriel Debru; Antoine Ghibaudo; Arthur Géa**	Mexico; Luca Lemaitre Vilchis; Sebastián Médica Sandoval; Rodrigo Pacheco Méndez	2–1	Argentina; Nicolás Eli; Juan Estévez; Gonzalo Zeitune
2022	(Turkey) Antalya	Brazil; João Fonseca; Gustavo Ribeiro de Almeida; Pedro Rodrigues*	2–0	United States; Kaylan Bigun; Meecah Bigun; Alexander Razeghi**	Italy; Lorenzo Angelini; Lorenzo Carboni; Federico Cinà	2–0	France; Thomas Faurel; Lucas Marionneau; Théo Papamalamis
2023	(Spain) Córdoba	Czech Republic; Jan Kumstát; Maxim Mrva; Martin Doskočil*	2–1	Italy; Federico Cinà; Andrea De Marchi; Matteo Sciahbasi**	United States; Darwin Blanch; Maxwell Exsted; Jagger Leach	2–1	Spain; Sergi Fita; Sergio Planella; Andrés Santamarta
2024	(Turkey) Antalya	United States; Keaton Hance; Jack Kennedy; Jack Secord*	2–0	Romania; Alejandro Nourescu; Yannick Alexandrescou; Cezar Bentzel**	Germany; Diego Dedura-Palomero; Christopher Thies; Oliver Majdandzic	1–1	Japan; Ryo Tabata; Hyu Kawanishi; Ren Matsumura
2025	(Chile) Santiago	United States; Andrew Johnson; Michael Antonius; Jordan Lee*	2–0	Japan; Takahiro Kawaguchi; Kanta Watanabe; Motoharu Abe**	Germany; Jannik Soetebier; Eric Dylan Müller; Jakob Joggerst	2–1	Turkey; Samim Filiz; Kaan Işık Koşaner; Ziya Ayberk Aydın
2026	(Egypt) Cairo	France; Pablo Pradat; Benoit Geldof; Joseph Phitoussi*	2–1	Czech Republic; Matyáš Maršík; Tommy Luxa; Tobiáš Zapský**	Japan; Takahiro Kawaguchi; Shintaro Ogaki; Junya Kawamura*	2–0	Brazil; Livas Eduardo de Carvalho Damazio; Henrique Pissette Vialle; Victor Pignaton**

Legend
* was part of the winning team but did not play in the final
** was part of the team but did not play in the final

=== Junior Billie Jean King Cup ===
Year	Host city	Champion	Score	Runner-up	Third place	Score	Fourth place
1985	(Japan) Kobe	Czechoslovakia; Jana Pospíšilová; Radka Zrubáková	3–0	Australia; Sally McCann; Nicole Provis; Wendy Frazer	France; Alexia Dechaume-Balleret; Frédérique Martin; Sybille Niox-Château	3–0	Great Britain; Teresa Catlin; Sue McCarthy; Anne Simpkin
1986	(Japan) Tokyo	Belgium; Sandra Wasserman; Ann Devries; Caroline Neuprez	2–1	Czechoslovakia; Petra Langrová; Radka Zrubáková	Japan; Erika Kajitani; Yoriko Yamagishi; Ryoko Yamaguchi	2–1	Switzerland; Sandrine Jaquet; Mareke Plocher; Emanuela Zardo
1987	(West Germany) Freiburg im Breisgau	Australia; Rachel McQuillan; Jo-Anne Faull; Bilynda Potter*	2–1	Soviet Union; Elena Brioukhovets; Natalia Medvedeva; Natalia Biletskaya**	West Germany; Michaela Kriebel; Steffi Menning; Pamela Wallenfels	2–1	United States; Diedre Herman; Deborah Moringiello; Laxmi Poruri
1988	(Australia) Perth	Australia; Kerry-Anne Guse; Lorrae Guse; Kirrily Sharpe	3–0	Argentina; Federica Haumuller; Cristina Tessi; Ines Gorrochategui	Japan; Hiroko Hara; Naoko Sawamatsu; Yoriko Yamagishi	3–0	Belgium; Galia Angelova; Svetlana Krivencheva; Elena Pampoulova
1989	(Paraguay) Asunción	West Germany; Maja Živec-Škulj; Anke Huber; Katharina Düll	2–1	Czechoslovakia; Klára Matoušková; Karina Habšudová; Petra Kučová	Spain; Eva Bes; Inés Canadell; Pilar Pérez	2–1	Netherlands; Kristie Boogert; Petra Kamstra; Linda Niemantsverdriet
1990	(Netherlands) Rotterdam	Netherlands; Petra Kamstra; Linda Niemantsverdriet	2–1	Soviet Union; Irina Sukhova; Tatiana Ignatieva; Olga Lugina**	West Germany; Meike Babel; Anke Huber; Marketa Kochta	3–0	China; Cai Yujie; Huang Qiang; Yi Jing-Qian
1991	(Spain) Barcelona	Germany; Heike Rusch; Marketa Kochta; Kirstin Freye	2–1	Paraguay; Larissa Schaerer; Rossana de los Ríos; Magalí Benítez**	Netherlands; Lara Bitter; Maaike Koutstaal	2–1	Soviet Union; Julia Latrova; Elena Likhovtseva; Victoria Zvereva
1992	(Spain) Castelldefels	Belgium; Laurence Courtois; Nancy Feber; Stephanie Devillé	3–0	Argentina; Laura Montalvo; María Luciana Reynares; Mariana Díaz Oliva	United States; Nicole London; Karin Miller; Julie Steven	2–1	Czechoslovakia; Alena Havrlíková; Eva Krejčová; Zuzana Nemšáková
1993	(New Zealand) Wellington	Australia; Siobhan Drake-Brockman; Annabel Ellwood; Jodi Richardson	2–1	United States; Stephanie Nickitas; Amanda Basica; Cristina Moros	Spain; Paula Hermida; Rosa María Pérez; María Sánchez Lorenzo	3–0	Hungary; Rita Kuti-Kis; Petra Gáspár; Petra Mandula
1994	(United States) Tucson	South Africa; Jessica Steck; Surina De Beer; Giselle Swart*	3–0	France; Amélie Cocheteux; Amélie Castéra; Kildine Chevalier	United States; Amanda Basica; Stephanie Mabry; Lilia Osterloh	2–0	Italy; Alice Canepa; Natalia Fracassi; Elena Pioppo
1995	(Germany) Essen	France; Karolina Jagieniak; Amélie Mauresmo; Kildine Chevalier	2–1	Germany; Stephanie Kovacic; Sandra Klösel; Caroline Christian	Austria; Nina Aigner; Petra Russegger; Barbara Schwartz	2–1	Czech Republic; Denisa Chládková; Jana Lubasová; Michaela Paštiková
1996	(Switzerland) Zürich	Slovenia; Katarina Srebotnik; Petra Rampre	2–1	Germany; Stephanie Kovacic; Jasmin Wöhr; Lisa Fritz**	Slovakia; Andrea Šebová; Silvia Uríčková; Gabriela Voleková	2–1	United States; Erin Boisclair; Brie Rippner; Alexandra Stevenson
1997	(Canada) Vancouver	Russia; Anastasia Myskina; Elena Dementieva	2–0	France; Samantha Schoeffel; Stéphanie Rizzi; Laëtitia Sanchez**	Australia; Jelena Dokic; Alicia Molik; Rochelle Rosenfield	2–0	Italy; Laura Dell'Angelo; Flavia Pennetta; Nathalie Viérin
1998	(Italy) Cuneo	Italy; Roberta Vinci; Maria Elena Camerin; Flavia Pennetta	2–1	Slovakia; Stanislava Hrozenská; Daniela Hantuchová; Katarína Bašternáková**	France; Stéphanie Cohen-Aloro; Mélinda Malouli; Virginie Razzano	2–0	Argentina; Eugenia Chialvo; Jorgelina Cravero; María Emilia Salerni
1999	(Australia) Perth	Argentina; Gisela Dulko; María Emilia Salerni; Eugenia Chialvo	2–1	Slovakia; Lenka Dlhopolcová; Ľubomíra Kurhajcová; Dominika Nociarová**	United States; Megan Bradley; Amber Liu; Kelly McCain	2–1	Czech Republic; Iveta Benešová; Eva Birnerová; Renata Voráčová
2000	(Japan) Hiroshima	Czech Republic; Eva Birnerová; Petra Cetkovská; Ema Janašková	2–1	Hungary; Dorottya Magas; Virág Németh; Ildikó Balázs**	Russia; Anna Bastrikova; Dinara Safina; Galina Voskoboeva	2–1	United States; Ashley Harkleroad; Bethanie Mattek-Sands; Kristen Schlukebir
2001	(Chile) Santiago	Czech Republic; Petra Cetkovská; Barbora Strýcová; Lucie Šafářová	3–0	Poland; Olga Brózda; Marta Domachowska; Alicja Rosolska	Hungary; Zsuzsanna Babos; Ildikó Csordás; Virág Németh	2–1	Germany; Anna-Lena Grönefeld; Claudia Kardys; Hannah Kuervers
2002	(France) La Baule-Escoublac	Belarus; Darya Kustova; Anastasiya Yakimova; Ekaterina Dzehalevich*	3–0	Czech Republic; Andrea Hlaváčková; Kateřina Böhmová	Russia; Ekaterina Kirianova; Olga Panova; Elena Vesnina	2–1	China; Du Rui; Gao Quan; Sun Shengnan
2003	(Germany) Essen	Netherlands; Bibiane Schoofs; Michaëlla Krajicek; Lisanne Balk*	2–1	Canada; Ekaterina Shulaeva; Aleksandra Wozniak; Katarina Zoricic	Poland; Marta Leśniak; Magdalena Kiszczyńska; Anna Korzeniak	3–0	Israel; Shahar Pe'er; Milana Yusupov; Efrat Zlotikamin
2004	(Spain) Barcelona	Argentina; Betina Jozami; Florencia Molinero; Agustina Lepore*	2–0	Canada; Valérie Tétreault; Sharon Fichman; Tania Rice**	Netherlands; Marrit Boonstra; Bibiane Schoofs; Nicole Thyssen	2–1	Russia; Evgenia Grebenyuk; Ekaterina Kosminskaya; Ekaterina Makarova
2005	(Spain) Barcelona	Poland; Urszula Radwańska; Agnieszka Radwańska; Maksymiliana Wandel*	2–0	France; Estelle Guisard; Alizé Cornet; Noémie Scharle**	Czech Republic; Eva Kadlecová; Soňa Nováková; Kateřina Vaňková	2–1	Spain; Leticia Costas; Maite Gabarrús-Alonso; Sandra Soler
2006	(Spain) Barcelona	Belarus; Ima Bohush; Ksenia Milevskaya; Viktoria Yemialyanava*	2–1	Russia; Ksenia Lykina; Anastasia Pavlyuchenkova; Yulia Solonitskaya	Slovakia; Klaudia Boczová; Lenka Juríková; Kristina Kučová	2–1	Croatia; Indire Akiki; Petra Martić; Tereza Mrdeža
2007	(Italy) Reggio Emilia	Australia; Sally Peers; Isabella Holland	2–1	Poland; Sandra Zaniewska; Katarzyna Piter; Veronika Domagała**	Italy; Gioia Barbieri; Nastassja Burnett; Vivienne Vierin	2–0	Thailand; Noppawan Lertcheewakarn; Nicha Lertpitaksinchai; Kanyapat Narattana
2008	(Mexico) San Luis Potosí	United States; Christina McHale; Kristie Ahn; Sloane Stephens*	2–0	Great Britain; Heather Watson; Tara Moore; Amy Askew**	Hungary; Tímea Babos; Zsófia Mikó; Zsófia Susányi	2–0	Belarus; Anna Orlik; Nataliya Pintusova; Sviatlana Pirazhenka
2009	(Mexico) San Luis Potosí	Russia; Ksenia Kirillova; Daria Gavrilova; Polina Leykina*	2–0	Germany; Stephanie Wagner; Annika Beck; Anna-Lena Friedsam**	Slovakia; Jana Čepelová; Vivien Juhászová; Chantal Škamlová	2–1	Japan; Emi Mutaguchi; Akiko Omae; Risa Ozaki
2010	(Mexico) San Luis Potosí	Russia; Margarita Gasparyan; Daria Gavrilova; Victoria Kan*	2–1	China; Tian Ran; Tang Haochen; Zheng Saisai	Ukraine; Kateryna Kozlova; Ganna Poznikhirenko; Elina Svitolina	2–0	United States; Krista Hardebeck; Kyle McPhillips; Grace Min
2011	(Mexico) San Luis Potosí	Australia; Belinda Woolcock; Ashleigh Barty; Brooke Rischbieth*	2–0	Canada; Carol Zhao; Françoise Abanda; Erin Routliffe**	Czech Republic; Aneta Dvořáková; Barbora Krejčíková; Pera Rohanová	2–0	Italy; Giorgia Marchetti; Giulia Pairone; Camilla Rosatello
2012	(Spain) Barcelona	United States; Louisa Chirico; Taylor Townsend; Gabrielle Andrews	3–0	Russia; Alina Silich; Elizaveta Kulichkova; Daria Kasatkina	Brazil; Carolina Alves; Beatriz Haddad Maia; Ingrid Gamarra Martins	2–1	Australia; Naiktha Bains; Zoe Hives; Isabelle Wallace
2013	(Mexico) San Luis Potosí	Russia; Veronika Kudermetova; Daria Kasatkina; Aleksandra Pospelova*	2–0	Australia; Priscilla Hon; Naiktha Bains; Sara Tomic**	United States; Michaela Gordon; Kaitlyn McCarthy; Katerina Stewart	2–0	Hungary; Anna Bondár; Fanny Stollár; Rebeka Stolmár
2014	(Mexico) San Luis Potosí	United States; Tornado Alicia Black; CiCi Bellis; Sofia Kenin	3–0	Slovakia; Tereza Mihalíková; Viktória Kužmová; Tamara Kupková	Hungary; Dalma Gálfi; Fanni Stollár; Panna Udvardy	2–1	Russia; Anna Blinkova; Anna Kalinskaya; Aleksandra Pospelova
2015	(Spain) Madrid	Czech Republic; Monika Kilnarová; Markéta Vondroušová; Anna Slováková	2–1	United States; Kayla Day; Claire Liu; Michaela Gordon**	Canada; Bianca Andreescu; Charlotte Robillard-Millette; Vanessa Wong	3–0	Russia; Evgeniya Levashova; Olesya Pervushina; Elena Rybakina
2016	(Hungary) Budapest	Poland; Iga Świątek; Maja Chwalińska; Stefania Rogozińska-Dzik*	2–1	United States; Amanda Anisimova; Claire Liu; Caty McNally	Russia; Varvara Gracheva; Olesya Pervushina; Anastasia Potapova	3–0	Japan; Ayumi Miyamoto; Yuki Naito; Naho Sato
2017	(Hungary) Budapest	United States; Whitney Osuigwe; Caty McNally; Amanda Anisimova*	2–0	Japan; Yuki Naito; Naho Sato; Himari Satō**	Ukraine; Marta Kostyuk; Daria Snigur; Alina Tsyurpalevych	2–1	Canada; Leylah Fernandez; Layne Sleeth; Alexandra Vagramov
2018	(Hungary) Budapest	United States; Coco Gauff; Alexa Noel; Connie Ma*	2–1	Ukraine; Lyubov Kostenko; Daria Lopatetska; Kateryna Rublevska**	Slovakia; Romana Čisovská; Eszter Méri; Nina Stankovská	2–0	Russia; Polina Kudermetova; Avelina Sayfetdinova; Oksana Selekhmeteva
2019	(United States) Orlando	United States; Connie Ma; Katrina Scott; Robin Montgomery	2–1	Czech Republic; Barbora Palicová; Linda Nosková; Darja Viďmanová**	Russia; Polina Kudermetova; Oksana Selekhmeteva; Diana Shnaider	2–0	Germany; Mara Guth; Julia Middendorf; Nastasja Schunk
2020	Not held due to the COVID-19 pandemic	—N/a	—N/a	—N/a	—N/a	—N/a	—N/a
2021	(Turkey) Antalya	Czech Republic; Brenda Fruhvirtová; Sára Bejlek; Nikola Bartůňková*	2–0	Japan; Sara Saito; Sayaka Ishii; Ena Koike**	Russia; Yaroslava Bartashevich; Anastasiia Gureva; Elena Pridankina	2–1	Germany; Carolina Kuhl; Ella Seidel; Marie Vogt
2022	(Turkey) Antalya	United States; Valerie Glozman; Clervie Ngounoue; Iva Jovic*	3–0	Czech Republic; Magdaléna Smékalová; Lucie Urbanová; Tereza Valentová**	Japan; Mayu Crossley; Hayu Kinoshita; Sara Saito	2–1	Serbia; Teodora Kostović; Mia Ristić; Lana Virc
2023	(Spain) Córdoba	United States; Tyra Grant; Iva Jovic; Alanis Hamilton*	2–0	Czech Republic; Alena Kovačková; Laura Samsonová; Eliška Forejtková**	Great Britain; Hannah Klugman; Hephzibah Oluwadare; Mingge Xu	2–0	Spain; Charo Esquiva; Lorena Solar; Neus Torner
2024	(Turkey) Antalya	United States; Tyra Grant; Kristina Penickova; Julieta Pareja*	2–1	Romania; Maia Burcescu; Giulia Popa; Ioana-Ștefania Boian**	Czech Republic; Julie Paštiková; Tereza Krejčová; Sofie Hettlerová	2–0	Germany; Julia Stusek; Sonja Zhenikhova; Mariella Thamm
2025	(Chile) Santiago	United States; Kristina Penickova; Julieta Pareja; Annika Penickova*	2–0	France; Cindy Langlais; Ksenia Efremova; Nehira Sanon**	Czech Republic; Tereza Hermanová; Jana Kovačková; Sofie Hettlerová	2–0	Poland; Barbara Kostecka; Oliwia Sybicka; Antonina Snochowska
2026	(Egypt) Cairo	Czech Republic; Jana Kovačková; Kateřina Zajíčková; Ema Chladová*	2–1	Japan; Sakino Miyazawa; Yui Komada; Ran Wakana	Great Britain; Daniella Britton; Megan Knight; Annabel Wong*	2–1	Ukraine; Polina Skliar; Sofiia Bielinska; Anna Shchavinska**

Legend
* was part of the winning team but did not play in the final
** was part of the team but did not play in the final

== Medals (1985–2026) ==
=== Junior Davis Cup ===
Rank	Nation	Gold	Silver	Bronze	Total
1	Australia (AUS)	6	3	1	10
2	Spain (ESP)	6	0	0	6
3	United States (USA)	5	7	3	15
4	France (FRA)	5	3	3	11
5	Czech Republic (CZE)	4	6	2	12
6	Germany (GER)	3	3	3	9
7	Russia (RUS)	3	1	6	10
8	Japan (JPN)	2	1	1	4
9	Netherlands (NED)	2	1	0	3
10	Italy (ITA)	1	2	1	4
11	Canada (CAN)	1	2	0	3
12	Great Britain (GBR)	1	1	1	3
13	Brazil (BRA)	1	0	1	2
13	Chile (CHI)	1	0	1	2
15	Argentina (ARG)	0	2	4	6
16	Austria (AUT)	0	2	0	2
16	Croatia (CRO)	0	2	0	2
16	South Korea (KOR)	0	2	0	2
19	Venezuela (VEN)	0	1	1	2
20	New Zealand (NZL)	0	1	0	1
20	Romania (ROM)	0	1	0	1
22	Sweden (SWE)	0	0	7	7
23	Chinese Taipei (TPE)	0	0	1	1
23	Ecuador (ECU)	0	0	1	1
23	Mexico (MEX)	0	0	1	1
23	Serbia (SRB)	0	0	1	1
23	Slovakia (SVK)	0	0	1	1
23	Uruguay (URU)	0	0	1	1
Totals (28 entries)		41	41	41	123

- Russia include Soviet Union / Czech Republic include Czechoslovakia

=== Junior Billie Jean King Cup ===
Rank	Nation	Gold	Silver	Bronze	Total
1	United States (USA)	10	3	4	17
2	Czech Republic (CZE)	6	6	4	16
3	Australia (AUS)	5	2	1	8
4	Russia (RUS)	4	4	5	13
5	Germany (GER)	2	3	2	7
6	Poland (POL)	2	2	1	5
7	Argentina (ARG)	2	2	0	4
8	Netherlands (NED)	2	0	2	4
9	Belarus (BLR)	2	0	0	2
9	Belgium (BEL)	2	0	0	2
11	France (FRA)	1	4	2	7
12	Italy (ITA)	1	0	1	2
13	Slovenia (SLO)	1	0	0	1
13	South Africa (RSA)	1	0	0	1
15	Slovakia (SVK)	0	3	4	7
16	Japan (JPN)	0	3	3	6
17	Canada (CAN)	0	3	1	4
18	Hungary (HUN)	0	1	3	4
19	Great Britain (GBR)	0	1	2	3
19	Ukraine (UKR)	0	1	2	3
21	China (CHN)	0	1	0	1
21	Paraguay (PAR)	0	1	0	1
21	Romania (ROM)	0	1	0	1
24	Spain (ESP)	0	0	2	2
25	Austria (AUT)	0	0	1	1
25	Brazil (BRA)	0	0	1	1
Totals (26 entries)		41	41	41	123

- Russia include Soviet Union / Czech Republic include Czechoslovakia / Germany include West Germany

== U14 ==
- es:Copa Mundial de Tenis Juvenil (U14)

== Qualification ==
Regional Championship

1. European Junior Championships 14 & Under : Since 1976
2. European Junior Championships 16 & Under : Since 1976
3. European Junior Championships 18 & Under : Since 1976
4. es:Campeonato Sudamericano de Tenis (U12/U14/U16) Since 2006
5. Asian and Oceania U12/U14/U16
6. African U12/U14/U16

== See also ==
- Davis Cup
- Fed Cup
- ATP Cup
- World Team Cup
- es:Copa Mundial de Tenis Juvenil (U14)
- es:Campeonato Sudamericano de Tenis (U12/U14/U16)
- es:Copa Davis Juvenil
- es:Copa Fed Juvenil
