= Fabien Cousin =

Belgian tennis player (born 1969)

- Country (sports): Belgium
- Born: 21 January 1969 (age 56)
- Prize money: $26,682

Singles
- Career record: 0–1
- Highest ranking: No. 284 (30 Aug 1993)

Grand Slam singles results
- French Open: Q1 (1993, 1994, 1995)
- Wimbledon: Q1 (1993, 1994, 1996)
- US Open: Q2 (1994, 1995)

Doubles
- Highest ranking: No. 658 (25 Jul 1994)

Fabien Cousin (born 21 January 1969) is a Belgian former professional tennis player.

Cousin competed on the professional tennis tour in the 1990s and had a best singles ranking of 284 in the world. He qualified for his only ATP Tour main draw at the 1992 Lyon Grand Prix, where he lost his first round match in three sets to world number 22 Karel Nováček.
