= David Kass =

American tennis player

- Country (sports): United States
- Born: June 16, 1970 (age 54); Columbus, Ohio, U.S.
- Height: 5 ft 11 in (180 cm)
- Plays: Right-handed
- Prize money: $14,970

Singles
- Career record: 0–1
- Highest ranking: No. 288 (February 1, 1993)

Grand Slam singles results
- Australian Open: Q1 (1993)
- French Open: Q2 (1993)
- US Open: Q1 (1993)

Doubles
- Highest ranking: No. 348 (September 13, 1993)

David Kass (born June 16, 1970) is an American former professional tennis player.

== Biography ==
Born in 1970, Kass grew up in Bexley, a suburb of Columbus, Ohio. Kass, who won junior titles at both the Orange Bowl and Easter Bowl, represented the United States at the 1986 World Youth Cup (now the Junior Davis Cup), as a teammate of Michael Chang and Jim Courier.

Kass played college tennis at the University of Michigan, where he was a three-time All-American and was the 1992 Big Ten Player of the Year.

A right-handed player, Kass toured professionally from 1992 to 1993, reaching a career high singles ranking of 288 in the world. He was runner-up at an ATP Challenger event in Halifax in 1992, then in 1993 featured in the qualifying draws of three of the four grand slam tournaments.

From his home town of Columbus he now runs the Kass Tennis Academy. He is the current coach of Katrina Scott.
