= Jaime Cortés =

Colombian tennis player

- Full name: Jaime Cortés
- Country (sports): Colombia
- Born: 26 July 1964 (age 61) Bogotá, Colombia
- Plays: Right-handed
- Prize money: $47,483

Singles
- Career record: 0–2
- Highest ranking: No. 200 (17 August 1992)

Doubles
- Career record: 0–1
- Highest ranking: No. 504 (24 September 1990)

Jaime Cortés (born 26 July 1964) is a former professional tennis player from Colombia.

== Biography ==
Born in Bogotá, Cortés was a right-handed player, based in Fort Lauderdale, Florida.

Between 1989 and 1998, he featured in a total of 11 Davis Cup ties for Colombia, winning seven matches.

On the professional tour, he had a best ranking of 200 in the world and made two appearances in the main draw of the Colombia Open, an ATP Tour tournament in his home city.

Cortés now runs a tennis academy in Bogotá.
