= Fabio Silberberg =

Brazilian tennis player

- Full name: Fabio Silberberg
- Country (sports): Brazil
- Born: 25 March 1969 (age 55); São Paulo, Brazil
- Height: 1.91 m (6 ft 3 in)
- Turned pro: 1991
- Plays: Left-handed (one-handed backhand)
- Prize money: $73,823

Singles
- Career record: 1–2
- Career titles: 0; 2 Challenger, 0 Futures
- Highest ranking: No. 196 (18 May 1992)

Grand Slam singles results
- French Open: Q1 (1995)
- Wimbledon: Q3 (1993)
- US Open: Q1 (1993, 1995)

Doubles
- Career record: 1–1
- Career titles: 0; 1 Challenger, 0 Futures
- Highest ranking: No. 217 (27 February 1995)

Grand Slam doubles results
- Wimbledon: Q1 (1992, 1993)
- Last updated on: 9 September 2022.

Fabio Silberberg (born 25 March 1969) is a former professional tennis player from Brazil.

== Biography ==
Born in São Paulo, Silberberg was a left-handed player, with a one handed backhand. He learned his early tennis at the city's Paulistano Club and had his best year as a junior in 1987 when he finished 17th in the world rankings for singles. In doubles he made the boy's quarter-finals of the 1987 French Open with Alberto Mancini and ended the year at number 10 in the world.

Before turning professional in 1991 he competed at the University of Tennessee for three seasons, while studying for a sports management degree.

Silberberg played in the main draw at two ATP Tour tournaments, the Brasília Open and São Paulo Open, both in 1991. He had a first round exit in each, but made the second round of the doubles at Brasília, with John Stimpson.

He won a Challenger title at Whistler in 1991 and in the same year won a match against Guillermo Vilas at a São Paulo Challenger tournament. Further Challenger titles came in the doubles at Cali in 1992 and the singles at the 1994 Belo Horizonte Challenger.

In 1995 he played in a Davis Cup tie for Brazil, against Mexico on hard courts at the German Club in Mexico City. His win over Óscar Ortiz in the reverse singles was the only match Brazil won in the tie.

He retired from professional tennis in 1996 and now runs "Faberg Tour Experience", a São Paulo based travel company he founded in 2005.

== ATP Challenger and ITF Futures finals ==
=== Singles: 2 (2–0) ===
Legend ATP Challenger (2–0) ITF Futures (0–0)	Finals by surface Hard (2–0) Clay (0–0) Grass (0–0) Carpet (0–0)

Result	W–L	Date	Tournament	Tier	Surface	Opponent	Score
Win	1–0	Sep 1991	Whistler Mountain, Canada	Challenger	Hard	(United States) David Witt	7–5, 6–3
Win	2–0	Aug 1994	Belo Horizonte, Brazil	Challenger	Hard	(Italy) Marco Meneschincheri	7–6, 6–3

=== Doubles: 3 (1–2) ===
Legend ATP Challenger (1–2) ITF Futures (0–0)	Finals by surface Hard (0–2) Clay (1–0) Grass (0–0) Carpet (0–0)

Result	W–L	Date	Tournament	Tier	Surface	Partner	Opponents	Score
Win	1–0	Oct 1992	Cali, Colombia	Challenger	Clay	(Germany) Michael Geserer	(Argentina) Daniel Orsanic (Cuba) Mario Tabares	6–4, 6–4
Loss	1–1	Jul 1994	Campos do Jordão, Brazil	Challenger	Hard	(Brazil) Marcelo Saliola	(Argentina) Patricio Arnold (United States) Richard Matuszewski	3–6, 4–6
Loss	1–2	Dec 1994	São Luís, Brazil	Challenger	Hard	(Brazil) João Zwetsch	(Portugal) João Cunha-Silva (The Bahamas) Roger Smith	6–4, 3–6, 3–6

== See also ==
- List of Brazil Davis Cup team representatives
