= Famiano Meneschincheri =

Italian tennis player

- Country (sports): Italy
- Born: 13 November 1957 (age 67); Rome, Italy
- Plays: Right-handed

Singles
- Career record: 2–6
- Highest ranking: No. 363 (3 January 1983)

Doubles
- Career record: 1–7
- Highest ranking: No. 455 (3 January 1983)

Famiano Meneschincheri (born 13 November 1957) is an Italian former professional tennis player.

Born in Rome, Meneschincheri is nicknamed "Mino" and comes from a tennis playing family. His younger brother Marco, as well as cousins Roberto and Stefano, were all professional tennis players.

Meneschincheri's best performances on the Grand Prix tennis circuit came in 1980 when he made the second round of the Japan Open and Sofia Open. On the ATP Challenger Tour, he was a semi-finalist at Kaduna in 1981.
