= David Witt =

American tennis coach and former player (born 1973)

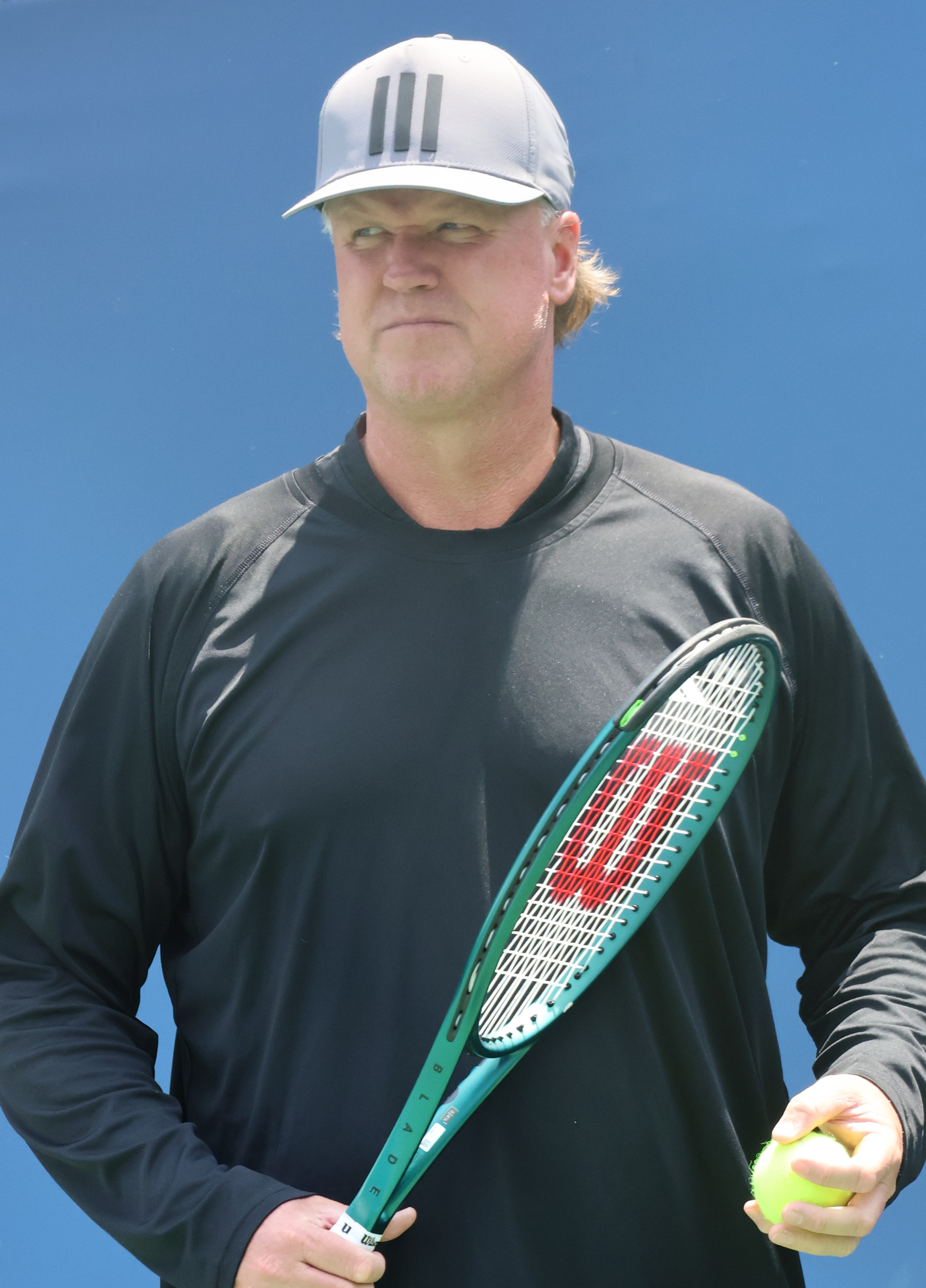
- Witt in 2024
- Country (sports): United States
- Residence: Ponte Vedra Beach, Florida, U.S.
- Born: June 2, 1973 (age 53) High Point, North Carolina, U.S.
- Height: 1.90 m (6 ft 3 in)
- Turned pro: 1991
- Plays: Right-handed
- Prize money: US$ 295,543

Singles
- Career record: 15–23
- Career titles: 0; 2 Challenger, 0 Futures
- Highest ranking: No. 128 (8 November 1993)

Grand Slam singles results
- Australian Open: 1R (1998)
- French Open: Q3 (1994)
- Wimbledon: 1R (1994)
- US Open: 2R (1994)

Doubles
- Career record: 13–17
- Career titles: 0; 2 Challenger, 0 Futures
- Highest ranking: No. 157 (22 August 1994)

Grand Slam doubles results
- French Open: 1R (1994)
- Wimbledon: Q3 (1993)
- US Open: 3R (1993)

David Witt (born June 2, 1973) is an American tennis coach and former professional player. He is currently coaching Peyton Stearns. Before that, he coached Aleksandar Kovacevic and is best known as the former long-time coach of Venus Williams and Jessica Pegula. He enjoyed a successful junior career, during which time he won the USTA Boys' 16s Clay, Hard and National Championships and was the top-ranked under-16 in the USTA in 1989. He was also a semifinalist at the US Open Junior Boys Singles event in 1991.

== Career ==
His closest career win on the main tour was in the U.S. Men's Clay Court Championships in Birmingham, Alabama, where he and Brian MacPhie were runners-up in the doubles in 1994. He did win two challenger-level events in his career: Guadalajara, Mexico in 1992 and the Levene Gouldin & Thompson Tennis Challenger at Binghamton, New York in 1997. He retired from professional tennis in 2005.

== Coaching ==
In 2002, while working as the resident pro at the Deerwood Country Club in Jacksonville, Florida, Witt was approached by the Williams sisters to act as a hitting partner during their participation at the Bausch & Lomb Championships at nearby Amelia Island. In 2007, they asked him to accompany them to Charleston, South Carolina for the Family Circle Cup. Since then he acted as a travelling hitting partner for both women, most notably for elder sister Venus. In December 2018, Venus ended the 11-year partnership.

David Witt coached Jessica Pegula from July 2019 to January 2024. In March 2024, Witt began coaching Maria Sakkari, and several months later, in July he started a collaboration with Frances Tiafoe, which ended in October 2025. In January 2026, Aleksandar Kovacevic hired Witt as a coach to start the 2026 season.

== ATP career finals ==
=== Doubles: 1 (runner-up) ===
Legend Grand Slam Tournaments (0–0) ATP Masters Series (0–0) ATP Championship Series (0–0) ATP World Series (0–1)	Finals by surface Hard (0–0) Clay (0–1) Grass (0–0) Carpet (0–0)	Finals by setting Outdoors (0–1) Indoors (0–0)

Result	W–L	Date	Tournament	Tier	Surface	Partner	Opponents	Score
Loss	0–1	Apr 1994	Birmingham, United States	World Series	Clay	(United States) Brian MacPhie	(United States) Richey Reneberg (South Africa) Christo van Rensburg	6–2, 3–6, 2–6

== ATP Challenger and ITF Futures finals ==
=== Singles: 4 (2–2) ===
Legend ATP Challenger (2–2) ITF Futures (0–0)	Finals by surface Hard (1–2) Clay (1–0) Grass (0–0) Carpet (0–0)

Result	W–L	Date	Tournament	Tier	Surface	Opponent	Score
Loss	0-1	Sep 1991	Whistler Mountain, Canada	Challenger	Hard	(Brazil) Fabio Silberberg	5–7, 3–6
Win	1-1	Nov 1992	Guadalajara, Mexico	Challenger	Clay	(Netherlands) Mark Koevermans	6–4, 6–3
Loss	1-2	Aug 1994	Binghamton, United States	Challenger	Hard	(India) Leander Paes	4–6, 2–6
Win	2-2	Aug 1997	Binghamton, United States	Challenger	Hard	(United States) Brian MacPhie	6–2, 6–4

=== Doubles: 4 (2–2) ===
Legend ATP Challenger (2–1) ITF Futures (0–1)	Finals by surface Hard (1–1) Clay (1–1) Grass (0–0) Carpet (0–0)

Result	W–L	Date	Tournament	Tier	Surface	Partner	Opponents	Score
Win	1–0	Jul 1994	Winnetka, United States	Challenger	Hard	(United States) Brian MacPhie	(United States) Doug Flach (United States) Wade McGuire	7–5, 6–2
Loss	1–1	Jul 1997	Flushing Meadows, United States	Challenger	Hard	(United States) Michael Joyce	(United States) Geoff Grant (United States) Mark Merklein	1–6, 4–6
Win	2–1	Apr 1998	Birmingham, United States	Challenger	Clay	(United States) Doug Flach	(Israel) Eyal Erlich (United States) Eric Taino	6–4, 7–5
Loss	2–2	May 2004	USA F11, Orange Park	Futures	Clay	(United States) Scott Melville	(United States) Levar Harper-Griffith (United States) Chris Kwon	5–7, 3–6

== Performance timelines ==
Key
W	F	SF	QF	#R	RR	Q#	DNQ	A	NH

(W) winner; (F) finalist; (SF) semifinalist; (QF) quarterfinalist; (#R) rounds 4, 3, 2, 1; (RR) round-robin stage; (Q#) qualification round; (DNQ) did not qualify; (A) absent; (NH) not held; (SR) strike rate (events won / competed); (W–L) win–loss record.

=== Singles ===
Tournament	1990	1991	1992	1993	1994	1995	1996	1997	1998	SR	W–L	Win %
Grand Slam tournaments
Australian Open	A	A	A	A	Q3	A	A	A	1R	0 / 1	0–1	0%
French Open	A	A	A	Q2	Q3	Q2	A	A	A	0 / 0	0–0	–
Wimbledon	A	Q1	Q1	Q3	1R	Q2	A	A	Q1	0 / 1	0–1	0%
US Open	1R	1R	Q2	1R	2R	A	A	Q1	Q1	0 / 4	1–4	20%
Win–loss	0–1	0–1	0–0	0–1	1–2	0–0	0–0	0–0	0–1	0 / 6	1–6	14%
ATP Tour Masters 1000
Indian Wells	A	A	A	Q1	Q1	A	A	A	A	0 / 0	0–0	–
Miami	A	2R	A	Q1	Q3	A	Q1	A	Q1	0 / 1	1–1	50%
Canada	A	A	A	A	A	A	A	A	Q1	0 / 0	0–0	–
Cincinnati	A	A	A	Q3	A	A	A	A	A	0 / 0	0–0	–
Win–loss	0–0	1–1	0–0	0–0	0–0	0–0	0–0	0–0	0–0	0 / 1	1–1	50%

=== Doubles ===
Tournament	1991	1992	1993	1994	1995	1996	1997	1998	SR	W–L	Win %
Grand Slam tournaments
Australian Open	A	A	A	A	A	A	A	A	0 / 0	0–0	–
French Open	A	A	A	1R	A	A	A	A	0 / 1	0–1	0%
Wimbledon	A	A	Q3	Q2	A	A	A	Q1	0 / 0	0–0	–
US Open	1R	A	3R	2R	A	A	2R	Q1	0 / 4	4–4	50%
Win–loss	0–1	0–0	2–1	1–2	0–0	0–0	1–1	0–0	0 / 5	4–5	44%
ATP Tour Masters 1000
Miami	A	A	Q2	A	A	A	A	A	0 / 0	0–0	–
Win–loss	0–0	0–0	0–0	0–0	0–0	0–0	0–0	0–0	0 / 0	0–0	–
