= Pierre Bouteyre =

French tennis player and coach (born 1971)

- Country (sports): France
- Born: 7 September 1971 (age 54) Nîmes, France
- Height: 1.85 m (6 ft 1 in)
- Plays: Right-handed
- Prize money: $54,033

Singles
- Career record: 2–3
- Career titles: 0
- Highest ranking: No. 249 (4 May 1992)

Grand Slam singles results
- French Open: 1R (1993)
- Wimbledon: 2R (1996)

Pierre Bouteyre (born 7 September 1971) is a tennis coach and former professional player from France.

Bouteyre qualified for two Grand Slam tournaments during his career. His first appearance was in the 1993 French Open, where he was defeated by Bart Wuyts in the opening round. He fared better at the 1996 Wimbledon Championships, winning a 230-minute-long five-set marathon over world number 23 Carlos Moyá, 10–8 in the final set. The Frenchman was eliminated in the second round, by seventh-seed Goran Ivanišević.

Bouteyre was Alize Cornet's coach in 2002–12 and 2018–19.

Bouteyre was Fiona Ferro's coach in 2012–15, when Ferro was 15–18 years old. In February 2022, Ferro filed a complaint with the French police at Fréjus accusing Bouteyre of rape and sexual assault by a person with authority. Bouteyre was indicted on 18 August 2022, placed under judicial supervision and banned from training players under 18. Ferro said that Bouteyre had had sex with her between 2012 and 2015, both in Saint-Raphaël, where she trained, and at tournaments abroad. Bouteyre did not dispute this, but said that there was no coercion and claimed that it had been a love story; he has appealed against the order. The French police questioned other players who Bouteyre had coached when they were under 18, and found no evidence of criminal behaviour by Bouteyre towards them. Bouteyre's appeal against the indictment at the Chamber of Investigation of the Court of Appeal of Aix-en-Provence was held in October 2024. This upheld the indictment, and Bouteyre will be tried by the Var criminal court in Draguignan.
