= Alejo Mancisidor =

Spanish tennis player (born 1970)

- Country (sports): Spain
- Born: 31 July 1970 (age 55) San Sebastián, Spain
- Height: 1.83 m (6 ft 0 in)
- Turned pro: 1991
- Plays: Right-handed
- Prize money: $149,180

Singles
- Career record: 5–21
- Career titles: 0
- Highest ranking: No. 120 (27 Feb 1995)

Grand Slam singles results
- US Open: 1R (1992)

Doubles
- Highest ranking: No. 433 (13 Jun 1994)

Alejo Mancisidor (born 31 July 1970) is a former professional tennis player from Spain.

== Career ==
Mancisidor played NCAA tennis while at Pepperdine University and was an All-American.

He was a quarter-finalist at the Guarujá Open in 1992, with wins over Peru's Jaime Yzaga and German Marc-Kevin Goellner.

The right-hander played Jeff Tarango in the opening round of the 1992 US Open and was beaten in five sets.

He defeated Yzaga again in 1994, at the Bancolombia Open, when the Peruvian was ranked 19th in the world.

=== Coach ===
Mancisidor coached WTA top 10 player Garbiñe Muguruza between 2010 and 2015.

== Challenger titles ==
=== Singles: (2) ===
No.	Year	Tournament	Surface	Opponent	Score
1.	1994	Bronx, United States	Hard	(United States) Chris Woodruff	6–2, 6–4
2.	1994	Natal, Brazil	Clay	(Brazil) Fernando Meligeni	6–3, 3–6, 7–5
