= Steve Bryan =

American tennis player

- Country (sports): United States
- Residence: Katy, Texas, U.S.
- Born: August 10, 1970 (age 55) Dallas, Texas, U.S.
- Height: 5 ft 10 in (1.78 m)
- Turned pro: 1990
- Plays: Right-handed
- Prize money: $560,562

Singles
- Career record: 36–70
- Career titles: 0
- Highest ranking: No. 80 (June 20, 1994)

Grand Slam singles results
- Australian Open: 3R (1996)
- French Open: 1R (1994)
- Wimbledon: 1R (1992, 1992, 1993, 1997)
- US Open: 2R (1994)

Doubles
- Career record: 1–6
- Career titles: 0
- Highest ranking: No. 307 (July 15, 1991)

Grand Slam doubles results
- US Open: 2R (1990)

Steve Bryan (born August 10, 1970) is a former professional tennis player from the United States.

== Career ==
Competing for The University of Texas, Bryan was the NCAA Men's Division I Singles Champion in 1990. He was the first sophomore to win the NCAA singles title since 1983, when Greg Holmes was victorious.

It wasn't until his ninth Grand Slam singles match that he made it past the first round, breaking the drought at the 1994 US Open, with a comfortable win over Franco Davín, dropping just two games. His tournament came to an end when he lost in the second round to fourth seed Michael Stich. His best run came in the 1996 Australian Open, where he defeated local players Heath Denman and Sandon Stolle, to reach the third round. He then met Andre Agassi and took the first set, but won just three more games for the rest of the match. The American also competed in the men's doubles on one occasion, at the 1990 US Open, with countryman Todd Martin. They won their opening round match over Nick Brown and Libor Pimek but were then eliminated by Guy Forget and Jakob Hlasek.

Bryan had his best performance on the ATP Tour at the 1993 Thriftway ATP Championships, an ATP Super 9 event (now Masters). He lost to Pete Sampras in the quarter-finals, but not before he had posted wins over world number eight Richard Krajicek and world number 12 Andrei Medvedev.

== Challenger titles ==
=== Singles: (2) ===
No.	Year	Tournament	Surface	Opponent	Score
1.	1994	Indian Wells, United States	Hard	(France) Olivier Delaître	6–3 ret.
2.	1996	Lexington, United States	Hard	(Italy) Nicola Bruno	6–2, 6–4
