= 1997 US Open – Women's doubles qualifying =

Women's doubles qualifying
- 1997 US Open

Events
Singles	men	women		boys	girls
Doubles	men	women	mixed	boys	girls
WC Singles	men	women	quad
WC Doubles	men	women	quad
Legends	men	women	mixed

Qualification
Singles	men	women
Doubles	men	women
- US Open

The qualifying rounds for the 1997 US Open were played from 20 to 23 August 1997 in the USTA National Tennis Center in Flushing Meadows, New York, United States.

== Seeds ==
1. (Hungary) Virág Csurgó / (Italy) Flora Perfetti (first round)
2. (United States) Erika deLone / (Australia) Nicole Pratt (qualifying competition)
3. (Australia) Lisa McShea / (United Kingdom) Amanda Wainwright (qualified)
4. (Georgia (country)) Nino Louarsabishvili / (Japan) Kaoru Shibata (qualifying competition)
5. (Belgium) Nancy Feber / (South Africa) Liezel Horn (qualifying competition)
6. (Austria) Karin Kschwendt / (India) Nirupama Vaidyanathan (first round)
7. (United States) Elly Hakami / (United States) Rebecca Jensen (first round)
8. (France) Caroline Dhenin / (United Kingdom) Valda Lake (first round)

== Qualifiers ==
1. (Czech Republic) Ludmila Richterová / (Bulgaria) Pavlina Stoyanova
2. (United States) Anne Miller / (United States) Julie Steven
3. (Australia) Lisa McShea / (United Kingdom) Amanda Wainwright
4. (United States) Cristina Moros / (United States) Julie Scott

== Draw ==
=== First qualifier ===
First round
1	(Hungary) Virág Csurgó (Italy) Flora Perfetti	7	6^{5}	4
(Czech Republic) Ludmila Richterová (Bulgaria) Pavlina Stoyanova	5	7^{7}	6
(France) Nathalie Dechy (France) Sarah Pitkowski	6	2	7
8	(France) Caroline Dhenin (United Kingdom) Valda Lake	4	6	5

Qualifying competition
(Czech Republic) Ludmila Richterová (Bulgaria) Pavlina Stoyanova	6	3	6
(France) Nathalie Dechy (France) Sarah Pitkowski	3	6	3

=== Second qualifier ===
First round
4	(Georgia (country)) Nino Louarsabishvili (Japan) Kaoru Shibata	7	2	6
WC	(United States) Jane Chi (United States) Kelly Pace	5	6	4
WC	(United States) Anne Miller (United States) Julie Steven	6	6
6	(Austria) Karin Kschwendt (India) Nirupama Vaidyanathan	2	3

Qualifying competition
4	(Georgia (country)) Nino Louarsabishvili (Japan) Kaoru Shibata	7^{7}	3	4
WC	(United States) Anne Miller (United States) Julie Steven	6^{4}	6	6

=== Third qualifier ===
First round
5	(Belgium) Nancy Feber (South Africa) Liezel Horn	4	6	6
(Austria) Sylvia Plischke (Germany) Marlene Weingärtner	6	2	1
(Belarus) Olga Barabanschikova (Portugal) Sofia Prazeres	4	3
3	(Australia) Lisa McShea (United Kingdom) Amanda Wainwright	6	6

Qualifying competition
5	(Belgium) Nancy Feber (South Africa) Liezel Horn	2	6^{6}
3	(Australia) Lisa McShea (United Kingdom) Amanda Wainwright	6	7^{8}

=== Fourth qualifier ===
First round
7	(United States) Elly Hakami (United States) Rebecca Jensen	4	3
WC	(United States) Cristina Moros (United States) Julie Scott	6	6
(Switzerland) Emmanuelle Gagliardi (Hungary) Katalin Marosi	4^{r}
2	(United States) Erika deLone (Australia) Nicole Pratt	4

Qualifying competition
WC	(United States) Cristina Moros (United States) Julie Scott	6	6
2	(United States) Erika deLone (Australia) Nicole Pratt	4	3
