= 1997 US Open – Men's singles qualifying =

Men's singles qualifying
- 1997 US Open

Events
Singles	men	women		boys	girls
Doubles	men	women	mixed	boys	girls
WC Singles	men	women	quad
WC Doubles	men	women	quad
Legends	men	women	mixed

Qualification
Singles	men	women
Doubles	men	women
- US Open

Players who neither had high enough rankings nor received wild cards to enter the main draw of the annual US Open Tennis Championships participated in a qualifying tournament held over several days before the event.

== Seeds ==
1. (Italy) Gianluca Pozzi (first round)
2. (Sweden) Tomas Nydahl (second round)
3. (France) Olivier Delaître (first round)
4. (Zimbabwe) Wayne Black (qualified)
5. (Uzbekistan) Oleg Ogorodov (qualified)
6. (Canada) Sébastien Lareau (first round)
7. (France) Nicolas Escudé (qualifying competition, lucky loser)
8. (Romania) Ionuț Moldovan (second round)
9. (Belgium) Dick Norman (qualifying competition)
10. (Germany) Bernd Karbacher (second round)
11. (Romania) Răzvan Sabău (first round)
12. (United States) Geoff Grant (qualified)
13. (Canada) Daniel Nestor (qualified)
14. (Sweden) Nicklas Kulti (first round)
15. (South Africa) Kevin Ullyett (first round)
16. (United States) Doug Flach (first round)
17. (Netherlands) Fernon Wibier (qualifying competition)
18. (Israel) Eyal Erlich (first round)
19. (Russia) Andrei Merinov (first round)
20. (South Africa) Neville Godwin (first round)
21. (Germany) Dirk Dier (qualifying competition)
22. (Brazil) Jaime Oncins (qualified)
23. (Germany) Rainer Schüttler (second round)
24. (Argentina) Gastón Etlis (first round)
25. (Australia) Allen Belobrajdic (qualifying competition)
26. (Australia) Michael Tebbutt (qualified)
27. (Israel) Eyal Ran (second round)
28. (Czech Republic) David Rikl (qualifying competition)
29. (Mexico) Luis Herrera (first round)
30. (Belgium) Christophe Van Garsse (qualifying competition)
31. (Mexico) Alejandro Hernandez (qualifying competition)
32. (Italy) Cristiano Caratti (qualified)

== Qualifiers ==
1. (Italy) Cristiano Caratti
2. (Germany) Patrick Baur
3. (Finland) Tuomas Ketola
4. (Zimbabwe) Wayne Black
5. (Uzbekistan) Oleg Ogorodov
6. (Netherlands) John van Lottum
7. (Australia) Michael Tebbutt
8. (Italy) Laurence Tieleman
9. (United States) Tommy Ho
10. (Venezuela) Jimy Szymanski
11. (Brazil) Jaime Oncins
12. (United States) Geoff Grant
13. (Canada) Daniel Nestor
14. (United States) Michael Sell
15. (Netherlands) Peter Wessels
16. (Australia) Todd Larkham

== Lucky losers ==
1. (France) Nicolas Escudé

== Qualifying draw ==
Key

- Q = Qualifier
- WC = Wild card
- LL = Lucky loser
- Alt = Alternate
- ITF = ITF entry
- PR = Protected ranking
- SR = Special ranking
- SE = Special exempt
- JE = Junior exempt
- JR = Junior Accelerator Programme entrant
- CO = College Accelerator Programme entrant
- NG = Next Gen Accelerator Program entrant
- w/o = Walkover
- r = Retired
- d = Defaulted

=== First qualifier ===
First round
1	(Italy) Gianluca Pozzi	7	4	4
(Italy) Mosé Navarra	6	6	6
(Australia) Grant Doyle	6	6
(Venezuela) Kepler Orellana	4	4
(Portugal) Emanuel Couto	6	2	6
(United Kingdom) Jamie Delgado	2	6	3
(France) Olivier Mutis	1	6	3
32	(Italy) Cristiano Caratti	6	4	6

Second round
(Italy) Mosé Navarra	2	6
(Australia) Grant Doyle	6	7
(Portugal) Emanuel Couto	7	1	3
32	(Italy) Cristiano Caratti	6	6	6

Qualifying competition
(Australia) Grant Doyle	6	3
32	(Italy) Cristiano Caratti	7	6

=== Second qualifier ===
First round
2	(Sweden) Tomas Nydahl	6	5	6
(Japan) Satoshi Iwabuchi	4	7	0
(Germany) Patrick Baur	6	6
WC	(United States) Phil Williamson	3	2
(Austria) Wolfgang Schranz	6	6	1
(France) Stéphane Huet	3	7	6
(Germany) Lars Rehmann	4	6	6
31	(Mexico) Alejandro Hernandez	6	1	7

Second round
2	(Sweden) Tomas Nydahl	4	6	3
(Germany) Patrick Baur	6	4	6
(France) Stéphane Huet	3	7	3
31	(Mexico) Alejandro Hernandez	6	6	6

Qualifying competition
(Germany) Patrick Baur	6	6
31	(Mexico) Alejandro Hernandez	4	4

=== Third qualifier ===
First round
3	(France) Olivier Delaître	6	4
(Finland) Tuomas Ketola	7	6
(New Zealand) Steven Downs	5	2
(United Kingdom) Andrew Richardson	7	6
(Argentina) Miguel Pastura	5	1
(Spain) Óscar Burrieza	7	6
WC	(United States) Paul Goldstein	7	6
29	(Mexico) Luis Herrera	5	3

Second round
(Finland) Tuomas Ketola	6	7
(United Kingdom) Andrew Richardson	3	6
(Spain) Óscar Burrieza	6	2	3
WC	(United States) Paul Goldstein	1	6	6

Qualifying competition
(Finland) Tuomas Ketola	6	6
WC	(United States) Paul Goldstein	3	4

=== Fourth qualifier ===
First round
4	(Zimbabwe) Wayne Black	6	3	6
(Australia) Ben Ellwood	4	6	3
(Venezuela) Nicolás Pereira	6	6
(Israel) Raviv Weidenfeld	4	4
(Canada) Bobby Kokavec	7	4	3
(Netherlands) Edwin Kempes	6	6	6
(Spain) Quino Muñoz	4	0
30	(Belgium) Christophe Van Garsse	6	6

Second round
4	(Zimbabwe) Wayne Black	6	6
(Venezuela) Nicolás Pereira	3	3
(Netherlands) Edwin Kempes	2	3
30	(Belgium) Christophe Van Garsse	6	6

Qualifying competition
4	(Zimbabwe) Wayne Black	6	2	6
30	(Belgium) Christophe Van Garsse	1	6	2

=== Fifth qualifier ===
First round
5	(Uzbekistan) Oleg Ogorodov	6	6
(Brazil) André Sá	4	3
(Australia) James Sekulov	6	6
WC	(United States) Marc Silva	1	4
WC	(United States) Mike Bryan	2	6	7
(France) Cyril Buscaglione	6	1	5
(France) Nicolas Thomann	4	7	6
28	(Czech Republic) David Rikl	6	6	7

Second round
5	(Uzbekistan) Oleg Ogorodov	6	7	6
(Australia) James Sekulov	7	5	3
WC	(United States) Mike Bryan	3	3
28	(Czech Republic) David Rikl	6	6

Qualifying competition
5	(Uzbekistan) Oleg Ogorodov	6	7
28	(Czech Republic) David Rikl	4	6

=== Sixth qualifier ===
First round
6	(Canada) Sébastien Lareau	2	6
(Canada) Albert Chang	6	7
(Germany) Lars Burgsmüller	6	6	6
(Japan) Hideki Kaneko	7	3	4
(Australia) Jaymon Crabb	4	4
(Netherlands) John van Lottum	6	6
(United States) Wade McGuire	2	0
27	(Israel) Eyal Ran	6	6

Second round
(Canada) Albert Chang	6	6
(Germany) Lars Burgsmüller	3	4
(Netherlands) John van Lottum	4	6	6
27	(Israel) Eyal Ran	6	2	0

Qualifying competition
(Canada) Albert Chang	2	4
(Netherlands) John van Lottum	6	6

=== Seventh qualifier ===
First round
7	(France) Nicolas Escudé	6	7
(France) Thierry Guardiola	3	6
(India) Mahesh Bhupathi	6	6	6
(United States) Steve Bryan	4	7	4
(United States) David Caldwell	6	0	4
(France) Pier Gauthier	3	6	6
(Australia) Steven Randjelovic	0	2
26	(Australia) Michael Tebbutt	6	6

Second round
7	(France) Nicolas Escudé	5	6	6
(India) Mahesh Bhupathi	7	2	3
(France) Pier Gauthier	w/o
26	(Australia) Michael Tebbutt

Qualifying competition
7	(France) Nicolas Escudé	6	4
26	(Australia) Michael Tebbutt	7	6

=== Eighth qualifier ===
First round
8	(Romania) Ionuț Moldovan	7	6
(Germany) Markus Zillner	5	3
(Italy) Laurence Tieleman	6	3	6
WC	(United States) James Blake	4	6	3
(New Zealand) Mark Nielsen	2	6	6
(United Kingdom) Danny Sapsford	6	3	2
(France) Sébastien Grosjean	6	3	2
25	(Australia) Allen Belobrajdic	4	6	6

Second round
8	(Romania) Ionuț Moldovan	6	4	0
(Italy) Laurence Tieleman	4	6	6
(New Zealand) Mark Nielsen	2	6	1
25	(Australia) Allen Belobrajdic	6	3	6

Qualifying competition
(Italy) Laurence Tieleman	6	6
25	(Australia) Allen Belobrajdic	3	4

=== Ninth qualifier ===
First round
9	(Belgium) Dick Norman	4	6	7
(Romania) Gabriel Trifu	6	3	6
(South Africa) David Nainkin	6	6	6
(Italy) Filippo Messori	3	7	2
(Italy) Giorgio Galimberti	2	6
(United States) Tommy Ho	6	7
WC	(United States) Taylor Dent	1	3
23	(Germany) Rainer Schüttler	6	6

Second round
9	(Belgium) Dick Norman	6	6
(South Africa) David Nainkin	2	3
(United States) Tommy Ho	6	7
23	(Germany) Rainer Schüttler	4	5

Qualifying competition
9	(Belgium) Dick Norman	3	4
(United States) Tommy Ho	6	6

=== Tenth qualifier ===
First round
10	(Germany) Bernd Karbacher	6	6
(Venezuela) Maurice Ruah	4	3
(Germany) Karsten Braasch	2	7	6
(Venezuela) Jimy Szymanski	6	6	7
(United States) Mark Merklein	6	6	4
(New Zealand) Alistair Hunt	3	7	6
(United States) Oren Motevassel	4	7	6
24	(Argentina) Gastón Etlis	6	5	3

Second round
10	(Germany) Bernd Karbacher	4	6	4
(Venezuela) Jimy Szymanski	6	1	6
(New Zealand) Alistair Hunt	2	2
(United States) Oren Motevassel	6	6

Qualifying competition
(Venezuela) Jimy Szymanski	6	6
(United States) Oren Motevassel	3	4

=== Eleventh qualifier ===
First round
11	(Romania) Răzvan Sabău	6	2	6
(Egypt) Tamer El-Sawy	4	6	7
(United Kingdom) Miles Maclagan	6	7
(France) Jean-Philippe Fleurian	2	6
(United States) Alex Reichel	6	6
(Australia) Peter Tramacchi	2	4
(Israel) Lior Mor	3	3
22	(Brazil) Jaime Oncins	6	6

Second round
(Egypt) Tamer El-Sawy	6	6
(United Kingdom) Miles Maclagan	3	4
(United States) Alex Reichel	4	1
22	(Brazil) Jaime Oncins	6	6

Qualifying competition
(Egypt) Tamer El-Sawy	2	5
22	(Brazil) Jaime Oncins	6	7

=== Twelfth qualifier ===
First round
12	(United States) Geoff Grant	6	6
WC	(United States) Bob Bryan	3	3
(United States) David Witt	4	4
WC	(United States) Michael Russell	6	6
(Brazil) Roberto Jabali	6	4	6
(United States) Bryan Shelton	4	6	7
Alt	(Australia) Michael Hill	2	5
21	(Germany) Dirk Dier	6	7

Second round
12	(United States) Geoff Grant	7	6
WC	(United States) Michael Russell	5	3
(United States) Bryan Shelton	7	5	3
21	(Germany) Dirk Dier	6	7	6

Qualifying competition
12	(United States) Geoff Grant	6	6
21	(Germany) Dirk Dier	3	4

=== Thirteenth qualifier ===
First round
13	(Canada) Daniel Nestor	6	7
(Switzerland) Ivo Heuberger	0	6
(France) Arnaud Clément	7	6	2
(France) Jean-François Bachelot	6	7	6
(Czech Republic) Petr Luxa	6	6
(South Africa) Robbie Koenig	4	1
(South Africa) Chris Haggard	2	6	6
19	(Russia) Andrei Merinov	6	3	4

Second round
13	(Canada) Daniel Nestor	6	6
(France) Jean-François Bachelot	3	2
(Czech Republic) Petr Luxa	6	6
(South Africa) Chris Haggard	3	4

Qualifying competition
13	(Canada) Daniel Nestor	4	6	6
(Czech Republic) Petr Luxa	6	3	2

=== Fourteenth qualifier ===
First round
14	(Sweden) Nicklas Kulti	3	6
(France) Charles Aufy	6	7
(France) Jean-Baptiste Perlant	6	7	4
(France) Stéphane Simian	7	6	6
(Germany) Carsten Arriens	6	6
(Switzerland) Lorenzo Manta	1	4
(United States) Michael Sell	7	4	7
20	(South Africa) Neville Godwin	5	6	6

Second round
(France) Charles Aufy	4	6	7
(France) Stéphane Simian	6	3	6
(Germany) Carsten Arriens	w/o
(United States) Michael Sell

Qualifying competition
(France) Charles Aufy	6	6	2
(United States) Michael Sell	2	7	6

=== Fifteenth qualifier ===
First round
15	(South Africa) Kevin Ullyett	4	1
(Austria) Gerald Mandl	6	6
(United States) Brian MacPhie	3	6
(France) Rodolphe Gilbert	6	7
(Japan) Gouichi Motomura	6	4	3
(Netherlands) Peter Wessels	4	6	6
(Austria) Herbert Wiltschnig	6	6
18	(Israel) Eyal Erlich	1	0

Second round
(Austria) Gerald Mandl	7	1	7
(France) Rodolphe Gilbert	6	6	6
(Netherlands) Peter Wessels	6	6
(Austria) Herbert Wiltschnig	1	1

Qualifying competition
(Austria) Gerald Mandl	5	4
(Netherlands) Peter Wessels	7	6

=== Sixteenth qualifier ===
First round
16	(United States) Doug Flach	3	4
(Australia) Todd Larkham	6	6
WC	(United States) Mashiska Washington	4	3
(Switzerland) Alexandre Strambini	6	6
(Switzerland) Filippo Veglio	4	4
(Croatia) Ivan Ljubičić	6	6
(United States) Glenn Weiner	3	3
17	(Netherlands) Fernon Wibier	6	6

Second round
(Australia) Todd Larkham	6	6
(Switzerland) Alexandre Strambini	1	3
(Croatia) Ivan Ljubičić	6	3	2
17	(Netherlands) Fernon Wibier	3	6	6

Qualifying competition
(Australia) Todd Larkham	6	5	6
17	(Netherlands) Fernon Wibier	3	7	2
