= 1997 US Open – Women's singles qualifying =

Women's singles qualifying
- 1997 US Open

Events
Singles	men	women		boys	girls
Doubles	men	women	mixed	boys	girls
WC Singles	men	women	quad
WC Doubles	men	women	quad
Legends	men	women	mixed

Qualification
Singles	men	women
Doubles	men	women
- US Open

Players who neither had high enough rankings nor received wild cards to enter the main draw of the annual US Open Tennis Championships participated in a qualifying tournament held over several days before the event.

== Seeds ==
1. (China) Fang Li (qualified)
2. (France) Nathalie Dechy (qualified)
3. (Canada) Sonya Jeyaseelan (first round)
4. (United Kingdom) Samantha Smith (qualified)
5. (Mexico) Angélica Gavaldón (qualified)
6. (Japan) Mana Endo (first round)
7. (Czech Republic) Lenka Němečková (first round)
8. (Australia) Siobhan Drake-Brockman (qualifying competition)
9. (Germany) Marlene Weingärtner (second round)
10. (Canada) Jana Nejedly (first round)
11. (Netherlands) Seda Noorlander (second round)
12. (Australia) Kristine Kunce (second round)
13. (Japan) Haruka Inoue (first round)
14. (Ukraine) Olga Lugina (qualified)
15. (Austria) Sylvia Plischke (qualifying competition)
16. (Australia) Nicole Pratt (qualified)

== Qualifiers ==
1. (China) Fang Li
2. (Czech Republic) Ludmila Richterová
3. (United Kingdom) Samantha Smith
4. (Ukraine) Olga Lugina
5. (Australia) Nicole Pratt
6. (Bulgaria) Pavlina Nola
7. (Mexico) Angélica Gavaldón
8. (France) Nathalie Dechy

== Qualifying draw ==
Key

- Q = Qualifier
- WC = Wild card
- LL = Lucky loser
- Alt = Alternate
- ITF = ITF entry
- PR = Protected ranking
- SR = Special ranking
- SE = Special exempt
- JE = Junior exempt
- JR = Junior Accelerator Programme entrant
- CO = College Accelerator Programme entrant
- NG = Next Gen Accelerator Program entrant
- w/o = Walkover
- r = Retired
- d = Defaulted

=== First qualifier ===
First round
1	(China) Fang Li	6	6
(United States) Jane Chi	3	3
(Germany) Sandra Klösel	2	6^{5}
(Sweden) Kristina Triska	6	7^{7}
(Ukraine) Elena Tatarkova	6	3	6
(Romania) Raluca Sandu	2	6	1
(Georgia (country)) Nino Louarsabishvili	6	2	6^{4}
11	(Netherlands) Seda Noorlander	3	6	7^{7}

Second round
1	(China) Fang Li	6	6
(Sweden) Kristina Triska	0	1
(Ukraine) Elena Tatarkova	7	6
11	(Netherlands) Seda Noorlander	5	4

Qualifying competition
1	(China) Fang Li	6	6
(Ukraine) Elena Tatarkova	2	3

=== Second qualifier ===
First round
10	(Canada) Jana Nejedly	6	4	5
(United States) Laxmi Poruri	1	6	7
(Hungary) Virág Csurgó	3	6	2
WC	(United States) Katrina Adams	6	2	6
WC	(United States) Holly Parkinson	4	6	2
(Czech Republic) Ludmila Richterová	6	1	6
(India) Nirupama Sanjeev	6	6
6	(Japan) Mana Endo	2	2

Second round
(United States) Laxmi Poruri	4	1
WC	(United States) Katrina Adams	6	6
(Czech Republic) Ludmila Richterová	6	7
(India) Nirupama Sanjeev	3	5

Qualifying competition
WC	(United States) Katrina Adams	4	4
(Czech Republic) Ludmila Richterová	6	6

=== Third qualifier ===
First round
4	(United Kingdom) Samantha Smith	6	6^{5}	6
(Slovenia) Tina Križan	2	7^{7}	1
(Australia) Rennae Stubbs	6	5	6
(Argentina) María José Gaidano	0	7	3
WC	(United States) Karin Miller	6	7
(Czech Republic) Ludmila Varmužová	2	5
(France) Caroline Dhenin	4	5
15	(Austria) Sylvia Plischke	6	7

Second round
4	(United Kingdom) Samantha Smith	2	6	6
(Australia) Rennae Stubbs	6	3	3
WC	(United States) Karin Miller	3	6	2
15	(Austria) Sylvia Plischke	6	3	6

Qualifying competition
4	(United Kingdom) Samantha Smith	6	6
15	(Austria) Sylvia Plischke	3	3

=== Fourth qualifier ===
First round
14	(Ukraine) Olga Lugina	6	6
(Australia) Jane Taylor	3	1
(Canada) Maureen Drake	7^{8}	6
(China) Chen Li-Ling	6^{6}	3
(Argentina) Mercedes Paz	2	6	6
(Germany) Miriam Schnitzer	6	1	4
(United States) Debbie Graham	3	3
8	(Australia) Siobhan Drake-Brockman	6	6

Second round
14	(Ukraine) Olga Lugina	6	5	7
(Canada) Maureen Drake	4	7	5
(Argentina) Mercedes Paz	5	6	4
8	(Australia) Siobhan Drake-Brockman	7	4	6

Qualifying competition
14	(Ukraine) Olga Lugina	6	6
8	(Australia) Siobhan Drake-Brockman	2	4

=== Fifth qualifier ===
First round
7	(Czech Republic) Lenka Němečková	6	5	6^{6}
(Israel) Anna Smashnova	3	7	7^{8}
WC	(United States) Cristina Moros	0	4
WC	(United States) Ginger Helgeson-Nielsen	6	6
(United States) Meghann Shaughnessy	7^{7}	6
(France) Amélie Cocheteux	6^{4}	2
(Argentina) Bettina Fulco	3	1
16	(Australia) Nicole Pratt	6	6

Second round
(Israel) Anna Smashnova	6	5	4
WC	(United States) Ginger Helgeson-Nielsen	2	7	6
(United States) Meghann Shaughnessy	7	5	1
16	(Australia) Nicole Pratt	5	7	6

Qualifying competition
WC	(United States) Ginger Helgeson-Nielsen	4	6^{3}
16	(Australia) Nicole Pratt	6	7^{7}

=== Sixth qualifier ===
First round
13	(Japan) Haruka Inoue	3	6^{6}
(France) Magalie Lamarre	6	7^{8}
(Luxembourg) Anne Kremer	7^{7}	6
(United Kingdom) Lucie Ahl	6^{1}	1
(South Korea) Park Sung-hee	6	7^{7}
(Czech Republic) Lenka Cenková	4	6^{1}
(Bulgaria) Pavlina Nola	7	6
3	(Canada) Sonya Jeyaseelan	5	4

Second round
(France) Magalie Lamarre	2	6	6^{4}
(Luxembourg) Anne Kremer	6	4	7^{7}
(South Korea) Park Sung-hee	4	2
(Bulgaria) Pavlina Nola	6	6

Qualifying competition
(Luxembourg) Anne Kremer	2	3
(Bulgaria) Pavlina Nola	6	6

=== Seventh qualifier ===
First round
5	(Mexico) Angélica Gavaldón	6	6
(Japan) Yuko Hosoki	3	2
(United Kingdom) Lorna Woodroffe	7	6
(Portugal) Sofia Prazeres	5	2
(Belgium) Nancy Feber	3	3
(Paraguay) Larissa Schaerer	6	6
(United Kingdom) Karen Cross	4	2
12	(Australia) Kristine Kunce	6	6

Second round
5	(Mexico) Angélica Gavaldón	6	6
(United Kingdom) Lorna Woodroffe	1	0
(Paraguay) Larissa Schaerer	6	2	6
12	(Australia) Kristine Kunce	2	6	1

Qualifying competition
5	(Mexico) Angélica Gavaldón	6	6^{3}	6
(Paraguay) Larissa Schaerer	1	7^{7}	4

=== Eighth qualifier ===
First round
9	(Germany) Marlene Weingärtner	6	6
(Croatia) Silvija Talaja	4	4
WC	(United States) Mashona Washington	6	6
WC	(United States) Julie Steven	3	2
(Ukraine) Elena Brioukhovets	6	1	0
(Madagascar) Dally Randriantefy	2	6	6
WC	(United States) Samantha Reeves	2	4
2	(France) Nathalie Dechy	6	6

Second round
9	(Germany) Marlene Weingärtner	4	6	3
WC	(United States) Mashona Washington	6	0	6
(Madagascar) Dally Randriantefy	4	1
2	(France) Nathalie Dechy	6	6

Qualifying competition
WC	(United States) Mashona Washington	3	5
2	(France) Nathalie Dechy	6	7
