= 1997 US Open – Men's doubles qualifying =

Men's doubles qualifying
- 1997 US Open

Events
Singles	men	women		boys	girls
Doubles	men	women	mixed	boys	girls
WC Singles	men	women	quad
WC Doubles	men	women	quad
Legends	men	women	mixed

Qualification
Singles	men	women
Doubles	men	women
- US Open

Players and pairs who neither have high enough rankings nor receive wild cards may participate in a qualifying tournament held one week before the annual US Open.

== Seeds ==
1. (France) Jean-Philippe Fleurian / (South Africa) Paul Rosner (first round)
2. (Czech Republic) Petr Luxa / (Uzbekistan) Oleg Ogorodov (first round)
3. (Romania) Dinu Pescariu / (Italy) Davide Sanguinetti (qualified)
4. (Sweden) Rikard Bergh / (Venezuela) Maurice Ruah (first round)
5. (Germany) Patrick Baur / (Sweden) Tomas Nydahl (qualifying competition)
6. (Mexico) Óscar Ortiz / (Brazil) André Sá (qualified)
7. (Austria) Georg Blumauer / (Romania) Gabriel Trifu (qualifying competition)
8. (South Africa) Chris Haggard / (Australia) Jamie Holmes (qualifying competition)

== Qualifiers ==
1. (The Bahamas) Roger Smith / (Australia) Peter Tramacchi
2. (South Africa) John-Laffnie de Jager / (South Africa) Robbie Koenig
3. (Romania) Dinu Pescariu / (Italy) Davide Sanguinetti
4. (Mexico) Óscar Ortiz / (Brazil) André Sá

== Draw ==
=== First qualifier ===
First round
1	(France) Jean-Philippe Fleurian (South Africa) Paul Rosner	6	6	4
(The Bahamas) Roger Smith (Australia) Peter Tramacchi	2	7	6
WC	(United States) David Caldwell (United States) Adam Peterson	1	4
8	(South Africa) Chris Haggard (Australia) Jamie Holmes	6	6

Qualifying competition
(The Bahamas) Roger Smith (Australia) Peter Tramacchi	4	6	6
8	(South Africa) Chris Haggard (Australia) Jamie Holmes	6	4	2

=== Second qualifier ===
First round
2	(Czech Republic) Petr Luxa (Uzbekistan) Oleg Ogorodov	7	6	3
(South Africa) John-Laffnie de Jager (South Africa) Robbie Koenig	5	7	6
(Germany) Marcus Hilpert (South Africa) Myles Wakefield	4	3
7	(Austria) Georg Blumauer (Romania) Gabriel Trifu	6	6

Qualifying competition
(South Africa) John-Laffnie de Jager (South Africa) Robbie Koenig	6	6
7	(Austria) Georg Blumauer (Romania) Gabriel Trifu	2	4

=== Third qualifier ===
First round
3	(Romania) Dinu Pescariu (Italy) Davide Sanguinetti	7	4	7
WC	(United States) James Blake (United States) Thomas Blake	6	6	6
(United States) Doug Flach (United States) Tommy Ho	1	6
5	(Germany) Patrick Baur (Sweden) Tomas Nydahl	6	7

Qualifying competition
3	(Romania) Dinu Pescariu (Italy) Davide Sanguinetti	6	6
5	(Germany) Patrick Baur (Sweden) Tomas Nydahl	4	2

=== Fourth qualifier ===
First round
4	(Sweden) Rikard Bergh (Venezuela) Maurice Ruah	3	7	6
(Egypt) Tamer El-Sawy (Federal Republic of Yugoslavia) Nenad Zimonjić	6	6	7
WC	(United States) Brady Blain (United States) Brook Blain	3	7	4
6	(Mexico) Óscar Ortiz (Brazil) André Sá	6	6	6

Qualifying competition
(Egypt) Tamer El-Sawy (Federal Republic of Yugoslavia) Nenad Zimonjić	6	2
6	(Mexico) Óscar Ortiz (Brazil) André Sá	7	6
