= Julie Thu =

American tennis player

- Full name: Julie Scott Thu
- Country (sports): United States
- Born: October 16, 1975 (age 50)
- Prize money: $49,873

Singles
- Career record: 72–65
- Highest ranking: No. 229 (July 12, 1999)

Doubles
- Career record: 67–49
- Highest ranking: No. 126 (May 22, 2000)

Grand Slam doubles results
- Wimbledon: 1R (2000)
- US Open: 1R (1997)

Julie Scott Thu (born October 16, 1975) is a former professional tennis player from the United States. She competed for most of her career as Julie Scott.

== Biography ==
A left-handed player from Austin, Texas, Thu played collegiate tennis at Stanford University and was a 5-time All-American, winning back to back Pac-10 singles championships in 1996 and 1997. She was a member of Stanford's 1997 NCAA championship team, with her win over Florida's Stephanie Nickitas securing the title. While at Stanford, she and Cristina Moros qualified for the women's doubles main draw at the 1997 US Open. She currently holds the Stanford record for most dual match wins in a single season with a 29–1 record.

From 1998, she toured as a professional, reaching a career high ranking of 229 in singles. As a doubles player, she was ranked 126 in the world in 2000 and played in the women's doubles main draw at Wimbledon that year, partnering Dawn Buth.

In 2001, she joined the Rice University women's tennis team as a coach.
