= Heather Willens =

American tennis player

- Country (sports): United States
- Born: October 11, 1971 (age 53)

Singles
- Career titles: 1 ITF
- Highest ranking: No. 379 (October 4, 1993)

Grand Slam singles results
- US Open: Q1 (1993)

Heather Willens (born October 11, 1971) is an American former professional tennis player.

Willens was raised in California and attended Palisades High School, then continued a family tradition by joining Stanford University. She is the daughter of Wimbledon quarter-finalist Jane Albert Willens and granddaughter of San Francisco 49ers quarterback Frankie Albert, both of whom played for Stanford in their respective sports.

A three-time All-American, she amassed a 91–14 record in dual singles, during her time at Stanford from 1990 to 1993.

On the professional tour, Willens reached a best singles ranking of 379 in the world while competing in the occasional tournament. She made her only WTA Tour main draw appearance at the 1993 Mazda Classic in San Diego and took part in the qualifying draw for the 1993 US Open.

== ITF finals ==
=== Doubles: 1 (1–0) ===
Outcome	Date	Tournament	Surface	Partner	Opponents	Score
Winner	July 6, 1992	Indianapolis, United States	Clay	(United States) Laxmi Poruri	(United States) Jeri Ingram (Sri Lanka) Lihini Weerasuriya	6–1, 6–1
