= 1993 US Open – Women's singles qualifying =

Women's singles qualifying
- 1993 US Open

Events
Singles	men	women		boys	girls
Doubles	men	women	mixed	boys	girls
WC Singles	men	women	quad
WC Doubles	men	women	quad
Legends	men	women	mixed

Qualification
Singles	men	women
- US Open

Players who neither had high enough rankings nor received wild cards to enter the main draw of the annual US Open Tennis Championships participated in a qualifying tournament held over several days before the event.

== Seeds ==
1. (United States) Beverly Bowes (second round)
2. (Japan) Yone Kamio (qualified)
3. (South Africa) Tessa Price (first round)
4. (Argentina) María José Gaidano (qualifying competition, lucky loser)
5. (France) Sarah Pitkowski-Malcor (first round)
6. (Japan) Rika Hiraki (qualifying competition)
7. (France) Isabelle Demongeot (qualifying competition)
8. (United States) Louise Allen (second round)
9. (Czech Republic) Petra Langrová (qualifying competition)
10. (Brazil) Andrea Vieira (qualified)
11. (Canada) Maureen Drake (first round)
12. (Italy) Elena Savoldi (first round)
13. (United States) Ann Henricksson (first round)
14. (Romania) Cătălina Cristea (qualifying competition)
15. (Australia) Louise Field (second round)
16. (France) Sylvie Sabas (second round)

== Qualifiers ==
1. (Netherlands) Petra Kamstra
2. (Australia) Jenny Byrne
3. (Slovakia) Karina Habšudová
4. (Brazil) Andrea Vieira
5. (Kazakhstan) Elena Likhovtseva
6. (Netherlands) Manon Bollegraf
7. (United States) Jeri Ingram
8. (Japan) Yone Kamio

== Lucky losers ==
1. (Argentina) María José Gaidano

== Qualifying draw ==
Key

- Q = Qualifier
- WC = Wild card
- LL = Lucky loser
- Alt = Alternate
- ITF = ITF entry
- PR = Protected ranking
- SR = Special ranking
- SE = Special exempt
- JE = Junior exempt
- JR = Junior Accelerator Programme entrant
- CO = College Accelerator Programme entrant
- NG = Next Gen Accelerator Program entrant
- w/o = Walkover
- r = Retired
- d = Defaulted

=== First qualifier ===
First round
1	(United States) Beverly Bowes	5	6	6
(United States) Patti O'Reilly	7	2	4
(France) Sophie Amiach	2	5
(Netherlands) Petra Kamstra	6	7
(Italy) Adriana Serra Zanetti	1	4
(United States) Donna Faber	6	6
WC	(United States) Cristina Moros	2	2
14	(Romania) Cătălina Cristea	6	6

Second round
1	(United States) Beverly Bowes	4	3
(Netherlands) Petra Kamstra	6	6
(United States) Donna Faber	2	3
14	(Romania) Cătălina Cristea	6	6

Qualifying competition
(Netherlands) Petra Kamstra	6	6
14	(Romania) Cătălina Cristea	0	3

=== Second qualifier ===
First round
16	(France) Sylvie Sabas	6	6
WC	(United States) Amanda Basica	2	2
(Japan) Maya Kidowaki	2	2
(Australia) Jenny Byrne	6	6
(United States) Cammy MacGregor	4	6	6
(Netherlands) Linda Niemantsverdriet	6	2	1
(Germany) Kirstin Freye	7^{7}	5	0
6	(Japan) Rika Hiraki	6^{5}	7	6

Second round
16	(France) Sylvie Sabas	1	1
(Australia) Jenny Byrne	6	6
(United States) Cammy MacGregor	2	6	5
6	(Japan) Rika Hiraki	6	4	7

Qualifying competition
(Australia) Jenny Byrne	6	6
6	(Japan) Rika Hiraki	4	3

=== Third qualifier ===
First round
3	(South Africa) Tessa Price	0	6	2
(Australia) Rennae Stubbs	6	4	6
WC	(United States) Andrea Farley	4	4
(Paraguay) Larissa Schaerer	6	6
(Slovakia) Karina Habšudová	6	7^{7}
WC	(United States) Nicole London	4	6^{3}
(United States) Jessica Emmons	6	6
12	(Italy) Elena Savoldi	2	2

Second round
(Australia) Rennae Stubbs	7^{7}	6
(Paraguay) Larissa Schaerer	6^{5}	2
(Slovakia) Karina Habšudová	6	6
(United States) Jessica Emmons	3	4

Qualifying competition
(Australia) Rennae Stubbs	6	3	5
(Slovakia) Karina Habšudová	4	6	7

=== Fourth qualifier ===
First round
10	(Brazil) Andrea Vieira	7	6
WC	(United States) Alix Creek	5	3
(Argentina) Mercedes Paz	6	4	1
(Germany) Susi Lohrmann	3	6	6
(Japan) Nana Smith	7^{7}	6
(United States) Mary-Lou Daniels	6^{4}	3
(Israel) Yael Segal	6^{4}	3
7	(France) Isabelle Demongeot	7^{7}	6

Second round
10	(Brazil) Andrea Vieira	4	6	6
(Germany) Susi Lohrmann	6	1	3
(Japan) Nana Smith	1	0
7	(France) Isabelle Demongeot	6	6

Qualifying competition
10	(Brazil) Andrea Vieira	6	5	7^{9}
7	(France) Isabelle Demongeot	4	7	6^{7}

=== Fifth qualifier ===
First round
5	(France) Sarah Pitkowski-Malcor	2	2
(Slovakia) Janette Husárová	6	6
(New Zealand) Julie Richardson	6^{4}	6^{7}
(Australia) Tracey Morton-Rodgers	7^{7}	7^{9}
(United Kingdom) Monique Javer	3	2
(Kazakhstan) Elena Likhovtseva	6	6
(Russia) Elena Makarova	6	6
11	(Canada) Maureen Drake	1	2

Second round
(Slovakia) Janette Husárová	7	6
(Australia) Tracey Morton-Rodgers	5	0
(Kazakhstan) Elena Likhovtseva	6	6
(Russia) Elena Makarova	4	3

Qualifying competition
(Slovakia) Janette Husárová	3	3
(Kazakhstan) Elena Likhovtseva	6	6

=== Sixth qualifier ===
First round
13	(United States) Ann Henricksson	4	5
(Netherlands) Manon Bollegraf	6	7
(United States) Aurora Gima	6	0	1
(United States) Anne Mall	2	6	6
(United States) Erika deLone	7	6
(United States) Shannan McCarthy	5	4
WC	(United States) Heather Willens	3	3
4	(Argentina) María José Gaidano	6	6

Second round
(Netherlands) Manon Bollegraf	5	7	6
(United States) Anne Mall	7	5	2
(United States) Erika deLone	7	3	4
4	(Argentina) María José Gaidano	5	6	6

Qualifying competition
(Netherlands) Manon Bollegraf	6	7
4	(Argentina) María José Gaidano	2	5

=== Seventh qualifier ===
First round
8	(United States) Louise Allen	4	7^{7}	6
(Italy) Rita Grande	6	6^{3}	3
(Netherlands) Caroline Vis	4	6	4
(Russia) Eugenia Maniokova	6	4	6
(United States) Jeri Ingram	6	6
WC	(United States) Tonya Evans	3	1
(United States) Elise Burgin	0	1
15	(Australia) Louise Field	6	6

Second round
8	(United States) Louise Allen	6^{2}	6^{2}
(Russia) Eugenia Maniokova	7^{7}	7^{7}
(United States) Jeri Ingram	5	6	6
15	(Australia) Louise Field	7	1	1

Qualifying competition
(Russia) Eugenia Maniokova	5	6	2
(United States) Jeri Ingram	7	3	6

=== Eighth qualifier ===
First round
9	(Czech Republic) Petra Langrová	6	6
(Japan) Hiromi Nagano	3	1
(Australia) Nicole Pratt	6	6
WC	(United States) Kara Schertzer	2	1
(France) Angelique Olivier	6
(Sweden) Maria Strandlund	1^{r}
(Poland) Katarzyna Teodorowicz-Lisowska	4	4
2	(Japan) Yone Kamio	6	6

Second round
9	(Czech Republic) Petra Langrová	7	6
(Australia) Nicole Pratt	5	4
(France) Angelique Olivier	4	6	2
2	(Japan) Yone Kamio	6	4	6

Qualifying competition
9	(Czech Republic) Petra Langrová	2	1
2	(Japan) Yone Kamio	6	6
