= Stephanie Nickitas =

American tennis player

- Full name: Stephanie Nickitas
- Country (sports): United States
- Born: 1977
- Prize money: $13,616

Singles
- Highest ranking: No. 739 (August 17, 1998)

Doubles
- Highest ranking: No. 474 (May 26, 1997)

Grand Slam doubles results
- US Open: 1R (1993, 1994, 1996, 1997)

Stephanie Nickitas (born 1977) is a former professional and college tennis player from the United States.

== Biography ==
Nickitas trained as a junior at the Saddlebrook Academy near Tampa, Florida. She played Junior Fed Cup tennis for the United States and twice made the girls' doubles semi-finals at the US Open juniors, in 1993 and 1994. In both of those years she also featured in the women's doubles draw with regular junior partner Cristina Moros.

With University of Florida teammate Dawn Buth, Nickitas made further US Open main draw appearances in the women's doubles in 1996 and 1997. The pair had received US Open wildcards each year for winning the NCAA doubles championships. They were the first players in women's NCAA history to win back to back Division I titles and reached a third successive final in 1998, but lost to California's Amanda Augustus and Amy Jensen. A six-time All-American, she also won two NCAA team championships with Florida. She graduated in 1999 with a degree in business administration.

Since finishing up as a player she has worked as a collegiate tennis coach. She was an assistant coach at Harvard and then Duke University, before a nine-season stint as head coach of the University of Central Florida, which ended with her retirement in 2016.
