= Tomas Nydahl =

Swedish tennis player (born 1968)

- Country (sports): Sweden
- Residence: Munich, Germany
- Born: 21 March 1968 (age 57); Linköping, Sweden
- Height: 1.85 m (6 ft 1 in)
- Turned pro: 1987
- Plays: Right-handed
- Prize money: $671,903

Singles
- Career record: 34–62
- Career titles: 0
- Highest ranking: No. 72 (4 May 1998)

Grand Slam singles results
- Australian Open: 2R (1994)
- French Open: 1R (1998)
- Wimbledon: 2R (1998)
- US Open: Q2 (1997)

Doubles
- Career record: 32–47
- Career titles: 0
- Highest ranking: No. 103 (18 December 1989)

Grand Slam doubles results
- French Open: 2R (1989)
- Wimbledon: Q1 (1993)
- US Open: Q2 (1997)

Tomas Nydahl (born 21 March 1968) is a former professional tennis player from Sweden. He reached a career high singles ranking of world No. 72 in 1998. He managed to beat players such as Thomas Muster, Marcelo Ríos, Tim Henman, Tommy Haas, Petr Korda. He won 12 Challenger Tournaments and finished runner-up at 3 doubles Tour events. Nydahl achieved a career-high world best doubles ranking of world No. 103 in May 1989.

== ATP career finals ==
=== Doubles: 3 (3 runner-ups) ===
| Legend Grand Slam Tournaments (0–0) ATP World Tour Finals (0–0) ATP Masters Series (0–0) ATP Championship Series (0–0) ATP World Series (0–3) | Finals by surface Hard (0–0) Clay (0–2) Grass (0–0) Carpet (0–1) | Finals by setting Outdoors (0–3) Indoors (0–0) |

| Result | W–L | Date | Tournament | Tier | Surface | Partner | Opponents | Score |
|---|---|---|---|---|---|---|---|---|
| Loss | 0–1 | Jun 1989 | Bologna, Italy | World Series | Clay | (Sweden) Jörgen Windahl | (Spain) Sergio Casal (Spain) Javier Sánchez | 2–6, 3–6 |
| Loss | 0–2 | Jul 1993 | Båstad, Sweden | World Series | Clay | (United States) Brian Devening | (Sweden) Henrik Holm (Sweden) Anders Järryd | 1–6, 6–3, 3–6 |
| Loss | 0–3 | Feb 1997 | Shanghai, China | World Series | Carpet | (Italy) Stefano Pescosolido | (Belarus) Max Mirnyi (Zimbabwe) Kevin Ullyett | 6–7, 7–6, 5–7 |

== ATP Challenger and ITF Futures finals ==
=== Singles: 11 (7–4) ===
| Legend ATP Challenger (7–4) ITF Futures (0–0) | Finals by surface Hard (0–0) Clay (6–4) Grass (0–0) Carpet (1–0) |

| Result | W–L | Date | Tournament | Tier | Surface | Opponent | Score |
|---|---|---|---|---|---|---|---|
| Loss | 0-1 | Jun 1991 | Seville, Spain | Challenger | Clay | (Germany) Lars Koslowski | 2–6, 6–3, 6–7 |
| Loss | 0-2 | Jul 1991 | New Ulm, Germany | Challenger | Clay | (France) Rodolphe Gilbert | 2–6, 4–6 |
| Loss | 0-3 | Jun 1992 | Cologne, Germany | Challenger | Clay | (Denmark) Kenneth Carlsen | 2–6, 3–1 ret. |
| Win | 1-3 | Feb 1993 | Emden, Germany | Challenger | Carpet | (Sweden) David Engel | 7–6, 4–6, 6–3 |
| Win | 2-3 | Nov 1995 | Ahmedabad, India | Challenger | Clay | (Israel) Eyal Ran | 6–4, 6–0 |
| Win | 3-3 | Jun 1996 | Weiden, Germany | Challenger | Clay | (Germany) Tommy Haas | 6–3, 3–6, 7–6 |
| Loss | 3-4 | Jun 1997 | Furth, Germany | Challenger | Clay | (Italy) Davide Sanguinetti | 4–6, 2–6 |
| Win | 4-4 | Jun 1997 | Eisenach, Germany | Challenger | Clay | (Italy) Davide Sanguinetti | 6–3, 6–1 |
| Win | 5-4 | Oct 1997 | Lima, Peru | Challenger | Clay | (Germany) Oliver Gross | 4–6, 6–0, 6–4 |
| Win | 6-4 | Oct 1997 | Guayaquil, Ecuador | Challenger | Clay | (Argentina) Mariano Zabaleta | 6–0, 6–3 |
| Win | 7-4 | Sep 1998 | Edinburgh, United Kingdom | Challenger | Clay | (Norway) Jan Frode Andersen | 6–4, 6–1 |

=== Doubles: 15 (6–9) ===
| Legend ATP Challenger (6–9) ITF Futures (0–0) | Finals by surface Hard (0–0) Clay (5–8) Grass (0–0) Carpet (1–1) |

| Result | W–L | Date | Tournament | Tier | Surface | Partner | Opponents | Score |
|---|---|---|---|---|---|---|---|---|
| Win | 1–0 | Nov 1990 | Munich, Germany | Challenger | Carpet | (Sweden) Peter Nyborg | (Czech Republic) Jaroslav Bulant (Italy) Gianluca Pozzi | 6–2, 1–6, 7–6 |
| Loss | 1–1 | Jul 1990 | Hanko, Finland | Challenger | Clay | (Sweden) Peter Svensson | (Australia) Johan Anderson (Sweden) Lars-Anders Wahlgren | 3–6, 5–7, 0–6 |
| Win | 2–1 | Sep 1991 | Bucharest, Romania | Challenger | Clay | (Germany) Lars Koslowski | (Romania) Gheorghe Cosac (Romania) Florin Segărceanu | 6–3, 2–6, 6–3 |
| Loss | 2–2 | Jan 1992 | Heilbronn, Germany | Challenger | Carpet | (Netherlands) Sander Groen | (United States) Doug Eisenman (Norway) Bent-Ove Pedersen | 1–6, 3–6 |
| Win | 3–2 | Jul 1992 | Seville, Spain | Challenger | Clay | (Sweden) Christer Allgårdh | (Chile) Sergio Cortés (Brazil) César Kist | 6–3, 6–2 |
| Loss | 3–3 | Sep 1993 | Prague, Czech Republic | Challenger | Clay | (Sweden) Mikael Tillström | (Czech Republic) David Rikl (Czech Republic) Pavel Vízner | 2–6, 6–7 |
| Loss | 3–4 | Mar 1994 | Agadir, Morocco | Challenger | Clay | (Germany) Bernd Karbacher | (Czech Republic) Slava Doseděl (Netherlands) Mark Koevermans | 7–6, 3–6, 6–7 |
| Win | 4–4 | Sep 1994 | Merano, Italy | Challenger | Clay | (Australia) Simon Youl | (Portugal) Emanuel Couto (Portugal) João Cunha-Silva | 6–4, 4–6, 6–4 |
| Loss | 4–5 | Sep 1994 | Venice, Italy | Challenger | Clay | (Australia) Simon Youl | (Italy) Cristian Brandi (Italy) Federico Mordegan | 3–6, 6–4, 3–6 |
| Win | 5–5 | Oct 1995 | Siracuse, Italy | Challenger | Clay | (Sweden) Magnus Norman | (Australia) Todd Larkham (Belgium) Tom Vanhoudt | 6–3, 6–4 |
| Loss | 5–6 | Apr 1996 | Naples, Italy | Challenger | Clay | (Latvia) Ģirts Dzelde | (Italy) Omar Camporese (Italy) Diego Nargiso | 6–3, 4–6, 6–7 |
| Loss | 5–7 | May 1996 | Dresden, Germany | Challenger | Clay | (Latvia) Ģirts Dzelde | (Sweden) Ola Kristiansson (Sweden) Mårten Renström | 6–3, 2–6, 5–7 |
| Loss | 5–8 | Jun 1996 | Weiden, Germany | Challenger | Clay | (Latvia) Ģirts Dzelde | (United States) Jonathan Leach (Italy) Mosé Navarra | 6–7, 5–7 |
| Loss | 5–9 | Sep 1996 | Alpirsbach, Germany | Challenger | Clay | (Latvia) Ģirts Dzelde | (Germany) Jens Knippschild (Germany) Karsten Braasch | 6–1, 3–6, 5–7 |
| Win | 6–9 | Oct 1997 | Guayaquil, Ecuador | Challenger | Clay | (Hungary) Gábor Köves | (Argentina) Diego del Río (Argentina) Mariano Puerta | 2–6, 6–3, 7–6 |

== Performance timelines ==
Key
| W | F | SF | QF | #R | RR | Q# | DNQ | A | NH |

(W) winner; (F) finalist; (SF) semifinalist; (QF) quarterfinalist; (#R) rounds 4, 3, 2, 1; (RR) round-robin stage; (Q#) qualification round; (DNQ) did not qualify; (A) absent; (NH) not held; (SR) strike rate (events won / competed); (W–L) win–loss record.

=== Singles ===
| Tournament | 1993 | 1994 | 1995 | 1996 | 1997 | 1998 | SR | W–L | Win % |
|---|---|---|---|---|---|---|---|---|---|
Grand Slam tournaments
| Australian Open | A | 2R | A | A | A | 1R | 0 / 2 | 1–2 | 33% |
| French Open | Q1 | Q1 | Q1 | Q1 | A | 1R | 0 / 1 | 0–1 | 0% |
| Wimbledon | Q3 | A | A | A | A | 2R | 0 / 1 | 1–1 | 50% |
| US Open | A | A | A | A | Q2 | A | 0 / 0 | 0–0 | – |
| Win–loss | 0–0 | 1–1 | 0–0 | 0–0 | 0–0 | 1–3 | 0 / 4 | 2–4 | 33% |
ATP Masters Series
| Indian Wells | A | A | Q2 | Q1 | A | A | 0 / 0 | 0–0 | – |
| Miami | A | A | Q2 | 2R | A | 1R | 0 / 2 | 0–2 | 0% |
| Monte Carlo | A | Q1 | A | Q2 | A | Q2 | 0 / 0 | 0–0 | – |
| Hamburg | A | A | A | A | 1R | A | 0 / 1 | 0–1 | 0% |
| Win–loss | 0–0 | 0–0 | 0–0 | 0–1 | 0–1 | 0–1 | 0 / 3 | 0–3 | 0% |

=== Doubles ===
| Tournament | 1989 | 1990 | 1991 | 1992 | 1993 | 1994 | 1995 | 1996 | 1997 | 1998 | SR | W–L | Win % |
|---|---|---|---|---|---|---|---|---|---|---|---|---|---|
Grand Slam tournaments
| Australian Open | A | A | A | A | A | A | A | A | A | A | 0 / 0 | 0–0 | – |
| French Open | 2R | 1R | A | A | A | A | A | A | A | A | 0 / 2 | 1–2 | 33% |
| Wimbledon | A | A | A | A | Q1 | A | A | A | A | A | 0 / 0 | 0–0 | – |
| US Open | A | A | A | A | A | A | A | A | Q2 | A | 0 / 0 | 0–0 | – |
| Win–loss | 1–1 | 0–1 | 0–0 | 0–0 | 0–0 | 0–0 | 0–0 | 0–0 | 0–0 | 0–0 | 0 / 2 | 1–2 | 33% |
ATP Masters Series
| Miami | A | A | A | A | A | A | 1R | A | A | Q1 | 0 / 1 | 0–1 | 0% |
| Monte Carlo | A | A | A | A | A | Q1 | A | Q2 | A | 1R | 0 / 1 | 0–1 | 0% |
| Hamburg | A | A | A | A | A | A | A | A | 1R | A | 0 / 1 | 0–1 | 0% |
| Win–loss | 0–0 | 0–0 | 0–0 | 0–0 | 0–0 | 0–0 | 0–1 | 0–0 | 0–1 | 0–1 | 0 / 3 | 0–3 | 0% |
