= Allen Belobrajdic =

Australian tennis player

- Full name: Allen Belobrajdic
- Country (sports): Australia
- Born: 18 September 1976 (age 50) Sydney, Australia
- Prize money: $83,068

Singles
- Career record: 1-4
- Career titles: 0
- Highest ranking: No. 146 (8 December 1997)

Grand Slam singles results
- Australian Open: 1R (1996, 1998)

Doubles
- Career record: 1-2
- Career titles: 0
- Highest ranking: No. 335 (12 February 1996)

Grand Slam doubles results
- Australian Open: 1R (1997)

Allen Belobrajdic (born 18 September 1976) is a former professional tennis player from Australia.

== Biography ==
Born in Sydney, Belobrajdic is the son of Croatian immigrants Ivan and Anna. A promising junior, he was at one stage the world's top ranked under-14s player. He made the quarter-finals of the boys' singles and doubles events at the 1994 Australian Open.

Belobrajdic, who turned professional in 1995, achieved a rare feat in 1997 when he became the first player in seven years to win all four legs of a satellite tournament. One of his victories came against a young Lleyton Hewitt.

On the ATP Tour, Belobrajdic was a quarter-finalist in the doubles at the 1996 Sydney Outdoor, with partner Grant Doyle. In 1998 he played in the singles of two ATP Tour tournaments, at Chennai where he made the second round and a first round appearance in Tokyo.

He played in the main draw at the Australian Open on three occasions. At the 1996 Australian Open he was given a wildcard and came up against world number 59 Martin Sinner in the first round. He won the first two sets, before the German came back to win in five. His appearance at the 1998 Australian Open was in doubles, after he fell in the final round of qualifying for the singles he partnered with Grant Doyle in the men's doubles. He earned another wildcard into the singles draw at the 1998 Australian Open and went down in the opening round to fourth seed Jonas Björkman, in a four set match.

Retiring due to a chronic shoulder condition in 1999, he now works as a tennis coach and as of 2019 is based in Singapore. Previously he has been a performance coach in Scotland, national coach in China, national coach in Hong Kong and national junior coach in Canada.

Belobrajdic was also coaching football in an amateur football team AFC Hearts which is in Division 1 of Yau Yee League for the season 2017/2018 in Hong Kong.
