= 1997 US Open – Women's singles =

Women's singles
- 1997 US Open

Final
- Champion: (Switzerland) Martina Hingis
- Runner-up: (United States) Venus Williams
- Score: 6–0, 6–4

Details
- Draw: 128
- Seeds: 16

Events
| Singles | men | women | | boys | girls |
| Doubles | men | women | mixed | boys | girls |
| WC Singles | men | women | quad |
| WC Doubles | men | women | quad |
| Legends | men | women | mixed |
- US Open

Martina Hingis defeated Venus Williams in the final, 6–0, 6–4 to win the women's singles tennis title at the 1997 US Open. It was her first US Open singles title and third major singles title overall. Hingis did not lose a set during the tournament. By reaching the final, she became the seventh woman (after Maureen Connolly, Margaret Court, Chris Evert, Martina Navratilova, Steffi Graf, and Monica Seles) to reach all four major singles finals in a calendar year. Hingis was the youngest woman to reach all four major finals at 16 years, 339 days old, and the youngest to win three majors in a calendar year at 16 years, 341 days old.

Williams was the first unseeded player in the Open Era to reach the final. She reached that stage after being two match points down in the third set of her semifinal clash with Irina Spîrlea.

Graf was the two-time reigning champion, but withdrew due to injury.

== Seeds ==
1. (Switzerland) Martina Hingis (champion)
2. (United States) Monica Seles (quarterfinals)
3. (Czech Republic) Jana Novotná (quarterfinals)
4. (Croatia) Iva Majoli (second round)
5. (South Africa) Amanda Coetzer (fourth round)
6. (United States) Lindsay Davenport (semifinals)
7. (Spain) Conchita Martínez (third round)
8. (Germany) Anke Huber (third round)
9. (France) Mary Pierce (fourth round)
10. (Spain) Arantxa Sánchez Vicario (quarterfinals)
11. (Romania) Irina Spîrlea (semifinals)
12. (United States) Mary Joe Fernández (fourth round)
13. (Netherlands) Brenda Schultz-McCarthy (second round)
14. (Austria) Barbara Paulus (first round)
15. (Romania) Ruxandra Dragomir (first round)
16. (United States) Kimberly Po (third round)

== Draw ==
Key

- Q = Qualifier
- WC = Wild card
- LL = Lucky loser
- Alt = Alternate
- ITF = ITF entry
- PR = Protected ranking
- SR = Special ranking
- SE = Special exempt
- JE = Junior exempt
- JR = Junior Accelerator Programme entrant
- CO = College Accelerator Programme entrant
- NG = Next Gen Accelerator Program entrant
- w/o = Walkover
- r = Retired
- d = Defaulted

=== Finals ===
Quarterfinals
1 | (Switzerland) Martina Hingis | 6 | 6
10 | (Spain) Arantxa Sánchez Vicario | 3 | 2
3 | (Czech Republic) Jana Novotná | 2 | 6 | 6^{5}
6 | (United States) Lindsay Davenport | 6 | 4 | 7^{7}
(United States) Venus Williams | 7 | 7
(France) Sandrine Testud | 5 | 5
11 | (Romania) Irina Spîrlea | 6^{7} | 7^{10} | 6
2 | (United States) Monica Seles | 7^{9} | 6^{8} | 3

Semifinals
1 | (Switzerland) Martina Hingis | 6 | 6
6 | (United States) Lindsay Davenport | 2 | 4
(United States) Venus Williams | 7^{7} | 4 | 7^{9}
11 | (Romania) Irina Spîrlea | 6^{5} | 6 | 6^{7}

Final
1 | (Switzerland) Martina Hingis | 6 | 6
(United States) Venus Williams | 0 | 4

=== Top half ===
==== Section 1 ====
First round
1 | (Switzerland) M Hingis | 6 | 6
(United States) T Whitlinger-Jones | 0 | 1
(Czech Republic) D Chládková | 6 | 1 | 6
(Czech Republic) H Suková | 1 | 6 | 1
(Czech Republic) P Langrová | 5 | 4
(Russia) E Likhovtseva | 7 | 6
(Germany) J Kandarr | 1 | 1
Q | (Czech Republic) L Richterová | 6 | 6
Q | (Mexico) A Gavaldón | 2 | 1
(Argentina) F Labat | 6 | 6
Q | (China) F Li | 4 | 6 | 2
(Italy) F Lubiani | 6 | 3 | 6
(Italy) L Golarsa | 3 | 3
(Belarus) O Barabanschikova | 6 | 6
(Sweden) Å Carlsson | 7 | 3 | 4
13 | (Netherlands) B Schultz-McCarthy | 6 | 6 | 6

Second round
1 | (Switzerland) M Hingis | 6 | 6
(Czech Republic) D Chládková | 1 | 2
(Russia) E Likhovtseva | 7 | 6
Q | (Czech Republic) L Richterová | 5 | 1
(Argentina) F Labat | 6 | 6
(Italy) F Lubiani | 1 | 1
(Belarus) O Barabanschikova | 6 | 6
13 | (Netherlands) B Schultz-McCarthy | 3 | 3

Third round
1 | (Switzerland) M Hingis | 7 | 6
(Russia) E Likhovtseva | 5 | 2
(Argentina) F Labat | 4 | 7 | 6
(Belarus) O Barabanschikova | 6 | 6 | 1

Fourth round
1 | (Switzerland) M Hingis | 6 | 6
(Argentina) F Labat | 0 | 2

==== Section 2 ====
First round
10 | (Spain) A Sánchez Vicario | 6 | 6
(Australia) K-A Guse | 2 | 4
(United States) J Watanabe | 3 | 5
(United States) M Tu | 6 | 7
(Argentina) I Gorrochategui | 2 | 5
(Japan) N Miyagi | 6 | 7
(France) A Fusai | 6 | 6
(Monaco) E Gagliardi | 1 | 1
(Japan) R Hiraki | 6 | 4 | 6
(Argentina) M Díaz Oliva | 4 | 6 | 2
(Australia) R McQuillan | 4 | 7 | 6
(Spain) C Torrens Valero | 6 | 5 | 4
Q | (United Kingdom) S Smith | 6 | 6
Q | (Australia) N Pratt | 3 | 1
(United States) J Capriati | 1 | 2
7 | (Spain) C Martínez | 6 | 6

Second round
10 | (Spain) A Sánchez Vicario | 6 | 5 | 6
(United States) M Tu | 2 | 7 | 2
(Japan) N Miyagi | 3 | 6 | 4
(France) A Fusai | 6 | 3 | 6
(Japan) R Hiraki | 0 | 2
(Australia) R McQuillan | 6 | 6
Q | (United Kingdom) S Smith | 1 | 0
7 | (Spain) C Martínez | 6 | 6

Third round
10 | (Spain) A Sánchez Vicario | 6 | 6
(France) A Fusai | 2 | 1
(Australia) R McQuillan | 6 | 7
7 | (Spain) C Martínez | 2 | 5

Fourth round
10 | (Spain) A Sánchez Vicario | 6 | 6
(Australia) R McQuillan | 1 | 2

==== Section 3 ====
First round
3 | (Czech Republic) J Novotná | 6 | 6
(Spain) V Ruano Pascual | 0 | 4
(Indonesia) Y Basuki | 6 | 6
(France) N van Lottum | 3 | 4
WC | (United States) B Rippner | 6 | 6
(Ukraine) N Medvedeva | 2 | 2
(Czech Republic) S Kleinová | 0 | 3
(Croatia) M Lučić | 6 | 6
(Austria) S Dopfer | 3 | 6 | 6
(Argentina) P Suárez | 6 | 3 | 7
WC | (United States) J Trail | 7 | 6
(Czech Republic) A Gerši | 6 | 2
(United States) S Cacic | 2 | 1
(Italy) R Grande | 6 | 6
(Japan) N Kijimuta | 2 | 3
12 | (United States) MJ Fernández | 6 | 6

Second round
3 | (Czech Republic) J Novotná | 6 | 6
(Indonesia) Y Basuki | 4 | 2
WC | (United States) B Rippner | 0 | 1
(Croatia) M Lučić | 6 | 6
(Argentina) P Suárez | 4 | 7 | 6
WC | (United States) J Trail | 6 | 5 | 4
(Italy) R Grande | 6 | 2 | 2
12 | (United States) MJ Fernández | 4 | 6 | 6

Third round
3 | (Czech Republic) J Novotná | 6 | 6 | 6
(Croatia) M Lučić | 2 | 7 | 3
(Argentina) P Suárez | 1 | 2
12 | (United States) MJ Fernández | 6 | 6

Fourth round
3 | (Czech Republic) J Novotná | 7 | 6
12 | (United States) MJ Fernández | 5 | 4

==== Section 4 ====
First round
16 | (United States) K Po | 6 | 6
(Czech Republic) E Martincová | 4 | 1
(Austria) M Maruska | 1 | 0
(Austria) B Schett | 6 | 6
(Spain) M Serna | 6 | 1 | 6
(Poland) M Grzybowska | 4 | 6 | 3
(Germany) P Begerow | 3 | 1
Q | (France) N Dechy | 6 | 6
(Switzerland) P Schnyder | 6 | 6
(Belgium) D Van Roost | 2 | 2
(United States) K Brandi | 7 | 1 | 4
(Japan) Y Yoshida | 6 | 6 | 6
(Germany) W Probst | 6 | 5 | 6
WC | (United States) L Lee | 1 | 7 | 3
WC | (United States) L McNeil | 2 | 6
6 | (United States) L Davenport | 6 | 7

Second round
16 | (United States) K Po | 6 | 4 | 7
(Austria) B Schett | 3 | 6 | 5
(Spain) M Serna | 6 | 6
Q | (France) N Dechy | 4 | 4
(Switzerland) P Schnyder | 4 | 6 | 6
(Japan) Y Yoshida | 6 | 2 | 4
(Germany) W Probst | 2 | 3
6 | (United States) L Davenport | 6 | 6

Third round
16 | (United States) K Po | 4 | 3
(Spain) M Serna | 6 | 6
(Switzerland) P Schnyder | 6 | 1 | 4
6 | (United States) L Davenport | 1 | 6 | 6

Fourth round
(Spain) M Serna | 0 | 3
6 | (United States) L Davenport | 6 | 6

=== Bottom half ===
==== Section 5 ====
First round
8 | (Germany) A Huber | 6 | 6
(Italy) G Pizzichini | 2 | 2
(United States) J Lee | 6 | 6 | 6
(Japan) M Saeki | 3 | 7 | 3
(Latvia) L Neiland | 7 | 0 | 1
(United States) V Williams | 5 | 6 | 6
(Spain) G León García | 4 | 6 | 6
(United States) A Miller | 6 | 2 | 3
(United States) C Rubin | 4 | 0
(Thailand) T Tanasugarn | 6 | 6
(Venezuela) M-A Vento | 1 | 7 | 6
(Germany) A Glass | 6 | 6 | 2
(Slovakia) H Nagyová | 6 | 6
(Poland) A Olsza | 3 | 0
(South Africa) J Kruger | 6 | 6 | 6
14 | (Austria) B Paulus | 1 | 7 | 1

Second round
8 | (Germany) A Huber | 6 | 6
(United States) J Lee | 2 | 1
(United States) V Williams | 6 | 6
(Spain) G León García | 0 | 1
(Thailand) T Tanasugarn | 6 | 6
(Venezuela) M-A Vento | 4 | 3
(Slovakia) H Nagyová | 4 | 6
(South Africa) J Kruger | 6 | 7

Third round
8 | (Germany) A Huber | 3 | 4
(United States) V Williams | 6 | 6
(Thailand) T Tanasugarn | 7 | 5 | 4
(South Africa) J Kruger | 6 | 7 | 6

Fourth round
(United States) V Williams | 6 | 6
(South Africa) J Kruger | 2 | 3

==== Section 6 ====
First round
15 | (Romania) R Dragomir | 2 | 6 | 3
(United States) L Raymond | 6 | 3 | 6
(Bulgaria) M Maleeva | 6 | 6
Q | (Bulgaria) P Stoyanova | 2 | 3
(France) N Tauziat | 5 | 6
(Slovakia) K Habšudová | 7 | 7
(United States) A Grossman | 7 | 5 | 2
(Japan) A Sugiyama | 6 | 7 | 6
(Canada) P Hy-Boulais | 6 | 6
(Germany) M Kochta | 2 | 1
(Slovakia) K Studeníková | 2 | 3
(Bulgaria) E Pampoulova | 6 | 6
(Spain) M Sánchez Lorenzo | 3 | 3
(France) S Testud | 6 | 6
(Romania) C Cristea | 3 | 2
4 | (Croatia) I Majoli | 6 | 6

Second round
(United States) L Raymond | 6 | 2 | 4
(Bulgaria) M Maleeva | 3 | 6 | 6
(Slovakia) K Habšudová | 5 | 6 | 7
(Japan) A Sugiyama | 7 | 3 | 5
(Canada) P Hy-Boulais | 3 | 6 | 6
(Bulgaria) E Pampoulova | 6 | 0 | 7
(France) S Testud | 6 | 2 | 6
4 | (Croatia) I Majoli | 4 | 6 | 1

Third round
(Bulgaria) M Maleeva | 6 | 5 | 1
(Slovakia) K Habšudová | 0 | 7 | 6
(Bulgaria) E Pampoulova | 1 | 3
(France) S Testud | 6 | 6

Fourth round
(Slovakia) K Habšudová | 3 | 6 | 6
(France) S Testud | 6 | 4 | 7

==== Section 7 ====
First round
5 | (South Africa) A Coetzer | 6 | 6
(United States) N Arendt | 3 | 2
(France) A-G Sidot | 3 | 6 | 3
(France) A Dechaume-Balleret | 6 | 3 | 6
(France) S Pitkowski | 6 | 4 | 7
(Canada) R Simpson | 1 | 6 | 6
(Belgium) E Callens | 3 | 4
(Italy) F Perfetti | 6 | 6
(United States) C Morariu | 7 | 7
(Australia) A Ellwood | 6 | 6
(Germany) B Rittner | 3 | 6 | 3
WC | (United States) L Osterloh | 6 | 1 | 6
(Russia) A Kournikova | 6 | 6
(Belgium) S Appelmans | 2 | 0
(United States) A Frazier | 1 | 1
11 | (Romania) I Spîrlea | 6 | 6

Second round
5 | (South Africa) A Coetzer | 6 | 6
(France) A Dechaume-Balleret | 1 | 1
(France) S Pitkowski | 4 | 3
(Italy) F Perfetti | 6 | 6
(United States) C Morariu | 7 | 1 | 0^{r}
WC | (United States) L Osterloh | 6 | 6 | 3
(Russia) A Kournikova | 1 | 6 | 3
11 | (Romania) I Spîrlea | 6 | 3 | 6

Third round
5 | (South Africa) A Coetzer | 6 | 7
(Italy) F Perfetti | 2 | 5
WC | (United States) L Osterloh | 2 | 5
11 | (Romania) I Spîrlea | 6 | 7

Fourth round
5 | (South Africa) A Coetzer | 6 | 4
11 | (Romania) I Spîrlea | 7 | 6

==== Section 8 ====
First round
9 | (France) M Pierce | 6 | 6
WC | (United States) G Fernández | 1 | 2
(Italy) S Farina | 6 | 6 | 6
(United States) L Wild | 4 | 7 | 4
(Japan) N Sawamatsu | 6 | 6
WC | (United States) E deLone | 4 | 3
(Slovakia) R Zrubáková | 1 | 5
(Belarus) N Zvereva | 6 | 7
(Russia) T Panova | 4 | 1
(Germany) M Babel | 6 | 6
(Russia) E Makarova | 6 | 4 | 4
(Netherlands) M Oremans | 3 | 6 | 6
WC | (United States) T Snyder | 6 | 7
Q | (Ukraine) O Lugina | 0 | 6
(Netherlands) K Boogert | 1 | 2
2 | (United States) M Seles | 6 | 6

Second round
9 | (France) M Pierce | 6 | 3
(Italy) S Farina | 2 | 0 | r
(Japan) N Sawamatsu | 4 | 6 | 3
(Belarus) N Zvereva | 6 | 3 | 6
(Germany) M Babel | 5 | 1
(Netherlands) M Oremans | 7 | 6
WC | (United States) T Snyder | 2 | 3
2 | (United States) M Seles | 6 | 6

Third round
9 | (France) M Pierce | 7 | 6
(Belarus) N Zvereva | 6 | 1
(Netherlands) M Oremans | 1 | 1
2 | (United States) M Seles | 6 | 6

Fourth round
9 | (France) M Pierce | 6 | 2 | 2
2 | (United States) M Seles | 1 | 6 | 6

| Preceded by 1997 Wimbledon Championships – Women's singles | Grand Slam women's singles | Succeeded by 1998 Australian Open – Women's singles |
