= Cristina Moros =

American tennis player

- Country (sports): United States
- Born: February 10, 1977 (age 49)
- Prize money: $16,151

Singles
- Highest ranking: No. 623 (September 8, 1997)

Grand Slam singles results
- US Open: Q1 (1993, 1997)

Doubles
- Highest ranking: No. 388 (November 9, 1998)

Grand Slam doubles results
- US Open: 1R (1993, 1994, 1997)

Cristina Moros (born February 10, 1977) is an American former professional tennis player.

Moros is originally from Florida and was a world number one junior in doubles. Her father Julio, a Venezuelan by birth, is a tennis coach who was a long time assistant to Nick Bollettieri. She is a goddaughter of Bollettieri.

Between 1994 and 1998, Moros played college tennis for the Texas Longhorns and achieved All-American selection in each of her four seasons. In 1995 she was a member of Texas's NCAA championship winning team. She is currently the head coach of the University of South Florida's women's tennis team.

== ITF finals ==
=== Doubles: 1 (0–1) ===
Outcome	Date	Tournament	Surface	Partner	Opponents	Score
Runner-up	May 17, 2005	El Paso, United States	Hard	(United States) Krista Damico	(United States) Beau Jones (Romania) Anda Perianu	5–7, 3–6
