= 1997 US Open – Boys' doubles =

Boys' doubles
- 1997 US Open

Final
- Champions: (Chile) Fernando González (Chile) Nicolás Massú
- Runners-up: (France) Jean-René Lisnard (France) Michaël Llodra
- Score: 6–4, 6–4

Events
Singles	men	women		boys	girls
Doubles	men	women	mixed	boys	girls
WC Singles	men	women	quad
WC Doubles	men	women	quad
Legends	men	women	mixed
- US Open

Bob and Mike Bryan were the defending champions, but none competed this year as both were playing for Stanford University during this season.

Fernando González and Nicolás Massú won the title by defeating Jean-René Lisnard and Michaël Llodra 6–4, 6–4 in the final. It was the 1st Grand Slam title for González, and the 2nd Grand Slam title for Massú, in their respective doubles careers.

== Seeds ==
The top seed received a bye into the second round.

1. (Chile) Fernando González / (Chile) Nicolás Massú (champions)
2. (Venezuela) José de Armas / (Peru) Luis Horna (first round)
3. (South Africa) Jaco van der Westhuizen / (South Africa) Wesley Whitehouse (first round)
4. (France) Arnaud Di Pasquale / (France) Julien Jeanpierre (semifinals)
5. (Australia) Nathan Healey / (Australia) Lleyton Hewitt (semifinals)
6. (United Kingdom) Simon Dickson / (United Kingdom) David Sherwood (first round)
7. (Italy) Federico Luzzi / (Czech Republic) Robin Vik (quarterfinals)
8. (United Kingdom) Iain Bates / (Germany) Thomas Messmer (quarterfinals)

== Draw ==
Key

- Q = Qualifier
- WC = Wild card
- LL = Lucky loser
- Alt = Alternate
- ITF = ITF entry
- PR = Protected ranking
- SR = Special ranking
- SE = Special exempt
- JE = Junior exempt
- JR = Junior Accelerator Programme entrant
- CO = College Accelerator Programme entrant
- NG = Next Gen Accelerator Program entrant
- w/o = Walkover
- r = Retired
- d = Defaulted

=== Finals ===
Semifinals
1	(Chile) Fernando González (Chile) Nicolás Massú	6	6
5	(Australia) Nathan Healey (Australia) Lleyton Hewitt	3	4
4	(France) Arnaud Di Pasquale (France) Julien Jeanpierre	3	5
(France) Jean-René Lisnard (France) Michaël Llodra	6	7

Final
1	(Chile) Fernando González (Chile) Nicolás Massú	6	6
(France) Jean-René Lisnard (France) Michaël Llodra	4	4

=== Top half ===
First round
(France) J Haehnel (Ivory Coast) V Sanon	1	1
(Italy) Nohuel Frocassi (Mexico) Ricardo Rizo	6	6
(Croatia) Davor Grgic (Austria) I Neumüller	6	4	4
(Denmark) Bob Borella (Hungary) Zoltán Papp	4	6	6
(United States) T Dent (United States) D Martin	3	6	5
8	(United Kingdom) Iain Bates (Germany) T Messmer	6	2	7
3	(South Africa) Jaco van der Westhuizen (South Africa) W Whitehouse	6	5
(United States) J Blake (United States) B Vahaly	7	7
(Georgia (country)) I Labadze (Israel) Kobi Ziv	6	6
(United States) S Lipsky (United States) Jeremy Wurtzman	3	3
(India) Manoj Mahadevan (India) H Mankad	3	3
(Germany) D Elsner (Germany) Tomas Zivnicek	6	6
(Chinese Taipei) Cheng Wei-jen (Japan) T Terachi	6	2	6
5	(Australia) N Healey (Australia) L Hewitt	2	6	7

Second round
1	(Chile) F González (Chile) N Massú	6	6
(Italy) N Frocassi (Mexico) R Rizo	1	2
(Denmark) B Borella (Hungary) Z Papp	1	4
8	(United Kingdom) I Bates (Germany) T Messmer	6	6
(United States) J Blake (United States) B Vahaly	6	6
(Georgia (country)) I Labadze (Israel) K Ziv	4	1
(Germany) D Elsner (Germany) T Zivnicek	6	4	6
5	(Australia) N Healey (Australia) L Hewitt	4	6	7

Quarterfinals
1	(Chile) F González (Chile) N Massú	7	4	6
8	(United Kingdom) I Bates (Germany) T Messmer	5	6	2
(United States) J Blake (United States) B Vahaly	6	3	4
5	(Australia) N Healey (Australia) L Hewitt	0	6	6

Semifinals
1	(Chile) F González (Chile) N Massú	6	6
5	(Australia) N Healey (Australia) L Hewitt	3	4

=== Bottom half ===
First round
6	(United Kingdom) Simon Dickson (United Kingdom) D Sherwood	4	6
(Argentina) Federico Cardinali (Czech Republic) Ladislav Chramosta	6	7
(Morocco) El Mehdi Belbacha-Jawhari (United States) Z Fleishman	4	6
(Poland) Filip Aniola (Poland) Jakub Ilowski	6	7
(Dominican Republic) Jorge Dueñas (Pakistan) A Qureshi	2	6
(United States) A Park (United States) T Parrott	6	7
(Azerbaijan) E Ağayev (Israel) A Ram	2	1
4	(France) A Di Pasquale (France) J Jeanpierre	6	6
7	(Italy) F Luzzi (Czech Republic) R Vik	7	4	6
(United States) N Overholser (Peru) R Rake	6	6	1
(Czech Republic) J Levinský (Croatia) L Zovko	7	6
(United States) Simone Amorico (United States) Chad Carlson	5	2
(Indonesia) P Handoyo (Egypt) Marwan Zewar	6	4	5
(France) J-R Lisnard (France) M Llodra	4	6	7
(United States) D Ayala (United States) Rafael de Mesa	6	6
2	(Venezuela) J de Armas (Peru) L Horna	4	1

Second round
(Argentina) F Cardinali (Czech Republic) L Chramosta	7	6
(Poland) F Aniola (Poland) J Ilowski	5	2
(United States) A Park (United States) T Parrott	7	3	2
4	(France) A Di Pasquale (France) J Jeanpierre	6	6	6
7	(Italy) F Luzzi (Czech Republic) R Vik	6	6
(Czech Republic) J Levinský (Croatia) L Zovko	3	2
(France) J-R Lisnard (France) M Llodra	6	6
(United States) D Ayala (United States) R de Mesa	4	1

Quarterfinals
(Argentina) F Cardinali (Czech Republic) L Chramosta	0	4
4	(France) A Di Pasquale (France) J Jeanpierre	6	6
7	(Italy) F Luzzi (Czech Republic) R Vik	3	6	5
(France) J-R Lisnard (France) M Llodra	6	3	7

Semifinals
4	(France) A Di Pasquale (France) J Jeanpierre	3	5
(France) J-R Lisnard (France) M Llodra	6	7
