= 1997 US Open – Mixed doubles =

Mixed doubles
- 1997 US Open
- 1996 Champions: (United States) Lisa Raymond (United States) Patrick Galbraith

Final
- Champions: (Netherlands) Manon Bollegraf (United States) Rick Leach
- Runners-up: (Argentina) Mercedes Paz (Argentina) Pablo Albano
- Score: 3–6, 7–5, 7–6^{(7–3)}

Details
- Draw: 32
- Seeds: 8

Events
Singles	men	women		boys	girls
Doubles	men	women	mixed	boys	girls
WC Singles	men	women	quad
WC Doubles	men	women	quad
Legends	men	women	mixed
- US Open

Lisa Raymond and Patrick Galbraith were the defending champions but lost in the semifinals to Mercedes Paz and Pablo Albano.

Manon Bollegraf and Rick Leach won in the final 3–6, 7–5, 7–6^{(7–3)} against Mercedes Paz and Pablo Albano.

== Seeds ==
Champion seeds are indicated in bold text while text in italics indicates the round in which those seeds were eliminated.

1. (United States) Lisa Raymond / (United States) Patrick Galbraith (semifinals)
2. (United States) Gigi Fernández / (South Africa) Ellis Ferreira (quarterfinals)
3. (Latvia) Larisa Neiland / (Russia) Andrei Olhovskiy (quarterfinals)
4. (France) Nathalie Tauziat / (Canada) Daniel Nestor (quarterfinals)
5. (Netherlands) **Manon Bollegraf** / (United States) **Rick Leach (champions)**
6. (Czech Republic) Helena Suková / (Czech Republic) Cyril Suk (second round)
7. (Indonesia) Yayuk Basuki / (Netherlands) Menno Oosting (second round)
8. (Japan) Rika Hiraki / (India) Mahesh Bhupathi (first round)

== Draw ==
Key

- Q = Qualifier
- WC = Wild card
- LL = Lucky loser
- Alt = Alternate
- ITF = ITF entry
- PR = Protected ranking
- SR = Special ranking
- SE = Special exempt
- JE = Junior exempt
- JR = Junior Accelerator Programme entrant
- CO = College Accelerator Programme entrant
- NG = Next Gen Accelerator Program entrant
- w/o = Walkover
- r = Retired
- d = Defaulted

=== Final ===
Final
	(Argentina) Mercedes Paz (Argentina) Pablo Albano	**6**	5	6^{3}
5	(Netherlands) **Manon Bollegraf** (United States) **Rick Leach**	3	**7**	**7^{7}**

=== Top half ===
First round
1	(United States) **L Raymond** (United States) **P Galbraith**	**7**	4	**6**
(Argentina) I Gorrochategui (Argentina) L Lobo	5	**6**	3
(Netherlands) K Boogert (United States) D Johnson	6^{3}	2
(Japan) **N Miyagi** (North Macedonia) **A Kitinov**	**7^{7}**	**6**
WC	(United States) L McNeil (United States) T. J. Middleton	6^{4}	2
(Russia) **E Likhovtseva** (United States) **J Tarango**	**7^{7}**	**6**
(Netherlands) M Oremans (Netherlands) H J Davids	**6**	3	5
7	(Indonesia) **Y Basuki** (Netherlands) **M Oosting**	3	**6**	**7**
3	(Latvia) **L Neiland** (Russia) **A Olhovskiy**	**6**	**7^{7}**
WC	(United States) L Osterloh (United States) B Bryan	0	6^{2}
(Russia) **A Kournikova** (Australia) **M Philippoussis**	**6**	**6**
(United States) D Graham (United States) J Grabb	4	3
(Argentina) **M Paz** (Argentina) **P Albano**	**6**	**6**
(United States) L Wild (United Kingdom) N Broad	3	4
(Germany) A Huber (Australia) J Eagle	1	r
6	(Czech Republic) **H Suková** (Czech Republic) **C Suk**	4

Second round
1	(United States) **L Raymond** (United States) **P Galbraith**	**6**	4	**6**
(Japan) N Miyagi (North Macedonia) A Kitinov	3	**6**	3
(Russia) **E Likhovtseva** (United States) **J Tarango**	**6**	5	**6**
7	(Indonesia) Y Basuki (Netherlands) M Oosting	3	**7**	2
3	(Latvia) **L Neiland** (Russia) **A Olhovskiy**	**6**	**6**
(Russia) A Kournikova (Australia) M Philippoussis	3	3
(Argentina) **M Paz** (Argentina) **P Albano**	**7^{7}**	**6**
6	(Czech Republic) H Suková (Czech Republic) C Suk	6^{5}	3

Quarterfinals
1	(United States) **L Raymond** (United States) **P Galbraith**	**7**	**6**
(Russia) E Likhovtseva (United States) J Tarango	5	3
3	(Latvia) L Neiland (Russia) A Olhovskiy
(Argentina) **M Paz** (Argentina) **P Albano**	w/o

Semifinals
1	(United States) L Raymond (United States) P Galbraith	4	6^{6}
(Argentina) **M Paz** (Argentina) **P Albano**	**6**	**7^{8}**

=== Bottom half ===
First round
5	(Netherlands) **M Bollegraf** (United States) **R Leach**	**6**	**6**
(United States) A Frazier (United States) T Kronemann	4	4
(Australia) **K-A Guse** (Australia) **D Macpherson**	**6**	2	**7^{7}**
(Romania) R Dragomir (India) L Paes	4	**6**	6^{4}
(Netherlands) C Vis (Netherlands) F Wibier	1	5
(United States) **K Po** (United States) **J Waite**	**6**	**7**
WC	(United States) R Jensen (United States) M Jensen	2	6^{1}
4	(France) **N Tauziat** (Canada) **D Nestor**	**6**	**7^{7}**
8	(Japan) R Hiraki (India) M Bhupathi	4	**6**	2
(United States) **K Adams** (Australia) **A Florent**	**6**	2	**6**
(Australia) R Stubbs (South Africa) B Talbot	4	3
(Netherlands) **B Schultz-McCarthy** (United States) **L Jensen**	**6**	**6**
(Argentina) P Tarabini (Belgium) L Pimek	2	3
(Belgium) **E Callens** (South Africa) **P Norval**	**6**	**6**
WC	(United States) C Rubin (United States) J Gimelstob	3	4
2	(United States) **G Fernández** (South Africa) **E Ferreira**	**6**	**6**

Second round
5	(Netherlands) **M Bollegraf** (United States) **R Leach**	**6**	**6**
(Australia) K-A Guse (Australia) D Macpherson	3	3
(United States) K Po (United States) J Waite	2	**6**	3
4	(France) **N Tauziat** (Canada) **D Nestor**	**6**	4	**6**
(United States) K Adams (Australia) A Florent	6^{6}	2
(Netherlands) **B Schultz-McCarthy** (United States) **L Jensen**	**7^{8}**	**6**
(Belgium) E Callens (South Africa) P Norval	6^{2}	2
2	(United States) **G Fernández** (South Africa) **E Ferreira**	**7^{7}**	**6**

Quarterfinals
5	(Netherlands) **M Bollegraf** (United States) **R Leach**	**7**	**6**
4	(France) N Tauziat (Canada) D Nestor	5	3
(Netherlands) **B Schultz-McCarthy** (United States) **L Jensen**	**7^{7}**	**6**
2	(United States) G Fernández (South Africa) E Ferreira	6^{4}	4

Semifinals
5	(Netherlands) **M Bollegraf** (United States) **R Leach**	**6**	**6**
(Netherlands) B Schultz-McCarthy (United States) L Jensen	3	4
