= 1997 US Open – Men's doubles =

Men's doubles
- 1997 US Open

Final
- Champion: (Russia) Yevgeny Kafelnikov (Czech Republic) Daniel Vacek
- Runner-up: (Sweden) Jonas Björkman (Sweden) Nicklas Kulti
- Score: 7–6^{(10–8)}, 6–3

Details
- Draw: 64
- Seeds: 16

Events
Singles	men	women		boys	girls
Doubles	men	women	mixed	boys	girls
WC Singles	men	women	quad
WC Doubles	men	women	quad
Legends	men	women	mixed
← 1996 ·	US Open	· 1998 →

The 1997 US Open was a tennis tournament played on outdoor hard courts at the USTA National Tennis Center in New York City in New York in the United States. It was the 117th edition of the US Open and was held from August 25 through September 7, 1997.

== Seeds ==
Champion seeds are indicated in bold text while text in italics indicates the round in which those seeds were eliminated.

1. (Australia) Todd Woodbridge / (Australia) Mark Woodforde (first round)
2. (Netherlands) Jacco Eltingh / (Netherlands) Paul Haarhuis (second round)
3. (Canada) Sébastien Lareau / (United States) Alex O'Brien (second round)
4. (Russia) **Yevgeny Kafelnikov** / (Czech Republic) **Daniel Vacek (champions)**
5. (Australia) Mark Philippoussis / (Australia) Patrick Rafter (third round)
6. (Argentina) Luis Lobo / (Spain) Javier Sánchez (second round)
7. Unknown (withdrew)
8. (South Africa) Ellis Ferreira / (United States) Patrick Galbraith (first round)
9. (United States) Rick Leach / (United States) Jonathan Stark (first round)
10. (India) Mahesh Bhupathi / (India) Leander Paes (semifinals)
11. (Sweden) Jonas Björkman / (Sweden) Nicklas Kulti (final)
12. (United Kingdom) Neil Broad / (South Africa) Piet Norval (first round)
13. (United States) Donald Johnson / (United States) Francisco Montana (third round)
14. (United States) Trevor Kronemann / (Australia) David Macpherson (third round)
15. (Canada) Grant Connell / (Canada) Daniel Nestor (third round)
16. (France) Olivier Delaître / (France) Fabrice Santoro (first round)

== Draw ==
=== Key ===
- Q = Qualifier
- WC = Wild card
- LL = Lucky loser
- Alt = Alternate
- ITF = ITF entry
- PR = Protected ranking
- SR = Special ranking
- SE = Special exempt
- JE = Junior exempt
- JR = Junior Accelerator Programme entrant
- CO = College Accelerator Programme entrant
- NG = Next Gen Accelerator Program entrant
- w/o = Walkover
- r = Retired
- d = Defaulted

=== Finals ===
Quarterfinals
(Zimbabwe) **Wayne Black** **(United States) Jim Grabb**	**7**	**6**
(Croatia) Goran Ivanišević (Czech Republic) Cyril Suk	6	3
(Czech Republic) Jiří Novák (Czech Republic) David Rikl	6	**6**	4
11	(Sweden) **Jonas Björkman** **(Sweden) Nicklas Kulti**	**7**	3	**6**
Q	(South Africa) John-Laffnie de Jager (South Africa) Robbie Koenig	5	5
4	(Russia) **Yevgeny Kafelnikov** **(Czech Republic) Daniel Vacek**	**7**	**7**
10	(India) **Mahesh Bhupathi** **(India) Leander Paes**	**6**	**7**
(South Africa) David Adams (South Africa) Wayne Ferreira	4	6

Semifinals
(Zimbabwe) Wayne Black (United States) Jim Grabb	5	6
11	(Sweden) **Jonas Björkman** **(Sweden) Nicklas Kulti**	**7**	**7**
4	(Russia) **Yevgeny Kafelnikov** **(Czech Republic) Daniel Vacek**	**7**	**7**
10	(India) Mahesh Bhupathi (India) Leander Paes	6	6

Final
11	(Sweden) Jonas Björkman (Sweden) Nicklas Kulti	6	3
4	(Russia) **Yevgeny Kafelnikov** **(Czech Republic) Daniel Vacek**	**7**	**6**

=== Top half ===
==== Section 1 ====
First round
(Netherlands) **T Kempers** **(Netherlands) M Oosting**	**6**	3	**6**
1	(Australia) T Woodbridge (Australia) M Woodforde	4	**6**	1
(Zimbabwe) **W Black** **(United States) J Grabb**	3	**6**	**6**
(Sweden) D Ekerot (Australia) M Tebbutt	**6**	2	3
(Argentina) **P Albano** **(Spain) À Corretja**	**7**	**6**
(United States) B Coupe (Socialist Federal Republic of Yugoslavia) N Djordjevic	5	4
15	(Canada) **G Connell** **(Canada) D Nestor**	**6**	**7**
(Australia) P Cash (Australia) A Kratzmann	3	6
(Croatia) **G Ivanišević** **(Czech Republic) C Suk**	**6**	**7**
9	(United States) R Leach (United States) J Stark	4	5
(Netherlands) **HJ Davids** **(Germany) J Knippschild**	**6**	**7**
(United States) TJ Middleton (Venezuela) N Pereira	3	6
WC	(United States) **M Sell** **(United States) D Witt**	6	**7**	**7**
(Netherlands) S Schalken (Netherlands) J Siemerink	**7**	6	6
(Czech Republic) **M Damm** **(Russia) A Olhovskiy**	4	**6**	**7**
(Belgium) L Pimek (South Africa) B Talbot	**6**	3	6

Second round
(Netherlands) T Kempers (Netherlands) M Oosting	**7**	4	6
(Zimbabwe) **W Black** **(United States) J Grabb**	5	**6**	**7**
(Argentina) P Albano (Spain) À Corretja
15	(Canada) **G Connell** **(Canada) D Nestor**	w/o
(Croatia) **G Ivanišević** **(Czech Republic) C Suk**	4	**6**	**6**
(Netherlands) HJ Davids (Germany) J Knippschild	**6**	4	3
WC	(United States) M Sell (United States) D Witt	5	**6**	6
(Czech Republic) **M Damm** **(Russia) A Olhovskiy**	**7**	3	**7**

Third round
(Zimbabwe) **W Black** **(United States) J Grabb**	**7**	**6**
15	(Canada) G Connell (Canada) D Nestor	6	1
(Croatia) **G Ivanišević** **(Czech Republic) C Suk**	**6**	**6**
(Czech Republic) M Damm (Russia) A Olhovskiy	4	2

Quarterfinals
(Zimbabwe) **W Black** **(United States) J Grabb**	**7**	**6**
(Croatia) G Ivanišević (Czech Republic) C Suk	6	3

==== Section 2 ====
First round
3	(Canada) **S Lareau** **(United States) A O'Brien**	**7**	**7**
(Belarus) M Mirnyi (Zimbabwe) K Ullyett	5	6
(Czech Republic) **J Novák** **(Czech Republic) D Rikl**	**7**	**7**
(South Africa) N Godwin (South Africa) G Muller	5	6
WC	(United States) **J Gimelstob** **(United States) C Woodruff**	5	**7**	**6**
(South Africa) M Ondruska (South Africa) G Stafford	**7**	6	4
14	(United States) **T Kronemann** **(Australia) D Macpherson**	2	**7**	**7**
(United States) G Grant (The Bahamas) M Merklein	**6**	6	5
11	(Sweden) **J Björkman** **(Sweden) N Kulti**	**6**	**6**
WC	(United States) B Bryan (United States) M Bryan	4	3
WC	(United States) **B Hawk** **(United States) N Overholser**	**7**	**7**
(South Africa) M Barnard (Netherlands) T Nijssen	5	6
Q	(Romania) **D Pescariu** **(Italy) D Sanguinetti**	**6**	**6**
(United States) S Davis (United States) K Jones	1	3
5	(Australia) **M Philippoussis** **(Australia) P Rafter**	**7**	**7**
(Czech Republic) P Korda (United States) R Reneberg	6	6

Second round
3	(Canada) S Lareau (United States) A O'Brien	4	6
(Czech Republic) **J Novák** **(Czech Republic) D Rikl**	**6**	**7**
WC	(United States) J Gimelstob (United States) C Woodruff
14	(United States) **T Kronemann** **(Australia) D Macpherson**	w/o
11	(Sweden) **J Björkman** **(Sweden) N Kulti**	**6**	**6**
WC	(United States) B Hawk (United States) N Overholser	2	;1
(Romania) D Pescariu (Italy) D Sanguinetti	2	4
5	(Australia) **M Philippoussis** **(Australia) Patrick Rafter**	**6**	**6**

Third round
(Czech Republic) **J Novák** **(Czech Republic) D Rikl**	**6**	**7**
14	(United States) T Kronemann (Australia) D Macpherson	4	5
11	(Sweden) **J Björkman** **(Sweden) N Kulti**	**6**	**6**
5	(Australia) M Philippoussis (Australia) Patrick Rafter	2	4

Quarterfinals
(Czech Republic) J Novák (Czech Republic) D Rikl	6	**6**	4
11	(Sweden) **J Björkman** **(Sweden) N Kulti**	**7**	3	**6**

=== Bottom half ===
==== Section 3 ====
First round
6	(Argentina) **L Lobo** **(Spain) J Sánchez**	4	**7**	**7**
(Netherlands) S Groen (Germany) D Prinosil	**6**	6	6
(United States) **D Randall** **(United States) J Waite**	**6**	**6**
WC	(United States) V Spadea (Philippines) E Taino	2	4
(United States) **B MacPhie** **(United States) J Salzenstein**	**7**	**6**
(South Africa) B Haygarth (United States) G Van Emburgh	6	3
Q	(South Africa) **J-L de Jager** **(South Africa) R Koenig**	2	**7**	**6**
12	(United Kingdom) N Broad (South Africa) P Norval	**6**	6	3
13	(United States) **D Johnson** **(United States) F Montana**	**6**	**6**
(Australia) J Eagle (Australia) A Florent	4	4
(Sweden) **P Nyborg** **(Armenia) S Sargsian**	**7**	6	**6**
(United States) L Jensen (United States) M Jensen	6	**7**	4
(Sweden) **P Fredriksson** **(Belgium) T Vanhoudt**	**6**	2	**6**
Q	(The Bahamas) R Smith (Australia) P Tramacchi	4	**6**	3
4	(Russia) **Y Kafelnikov** **(Czech Republic) D Vacek**	**6**	**6**
Q	(Mexico) Ó Ortiz (Brazil) A Sá	3	2

Second round
6	(Argentina) L Lobo (Spain) J Sánchez	3	6
(United States) **D Randall** **(United States) J Waite**	**6**	**7**
(United States) B MacPhie (United States) J Salzenstein	5	6
Q	(South Africa) **J-L de Jager** **(South Africa) R Koenig**	**7**	**7**
13	(United States) **D Johnson** **(United States) F Montana**	2	**7**	**6**
(Sweden) P Nyborg (Armenia) S Sargsian	**6**	6	4
(Sweden) P Fredriksson (Belgium) T Vanhoudt	**6**	2	1
4	(Russia) **Y Kafelnikov** **(Czech Republic) D Vacek**	4	**6**	**6**

Third round
(United States) D Randall (United States) J Waite	2	**6**	2
Q	(South Africa) **J-L de Jager** **(South Africa) R Koenig**	**6**	3	**6**
13	(United States) D Johnson (United States) F Montana	**6**	3	4
4	(Russia) **Y Kafelnikov** **(Czech Republic) D Vacek**	1	**6**	**6**

Quarterfinals
Q	(South Africa) J-L de Jager (South Africa) R Koenig	5	5
4	(Russia) **Y Kafelnikov** **(Czech Republic) D Vacek**	**7**	**7**

==== Section 4 ====
First round
(United States) **B Behrens** **(United States) P McEnroe**	**7**	4	**7**
8	(South Africa) E Ferreira (United States) P Galbraith	6	**6**	5
(France) **G Raoux** **(United States) J Tarango**	**7**	**6**
(Italy) C Brandi (Italy) F Messori	6	4
(Australia) **P Kilderry** **(Ecuador) N Lapentti**	4	**7**	**6**
(Germany) K Braasch (United States) B Shelton	**6**	6	4
10	(India) **M Bhupathi** **(India) L Paes**	**6**	**6**
(Australia) W Arthurs (North Macedonia) A Kitinov	4	4
(Spain) **A Berasategui** **(Mexico) D Roditi**	6	**6**	**6**
16	(France) O Delaître (France) F Santoro	**7**	3	3
(Netherlands) **S Noteboom** **(Netherlands) F Wibier**	2	**7**	**6**
WC	(Australia) T Blenkiron (Australia) L Smith	**6**	5	2
(South Africa) **D Adams** **(South Africa) W Ferreira**	4	**7**	**6**
(Brazil) G Kuerten (Brazil) F Meligeni	**6**	5	3
2	(Netherlands) **J Eltingh** **(Netherlands) P Haarhuis**	**7**	**7**
(Zimbabwe) B Black (New Zealand) B Steven	6	6

Second round
(United States) B Behrens (United States) P McEnroe	3	**7**	6
(France) **G Raoux** **(United States) J Tarango**	**6**	6	**7**
(Australia) P Kilderry (Ecuador) N Lapentti	**7**	3	6
10	(India) **M Bhupathi** **(India) L Paes**	6	**6**	**7**
(Spain) **A Berasategui** **(Mexico) D Roditi**	**6**	**6**
(Netherlands) S Noteboom (Netherlands) F Wibier	4	3
(South Africa) **D Adams** **(South Africa) W Ferreira**	**6**	**7**
2	(Netherlands) J Eltingh (Netherlands) P Haarhuis	4	6

Third round
(France) G Raoux (United States) J Tarango	**6**	4	6
10	(India) **M Bhupathi** **(India) L Paes**	4	**6**	**7**
(Spain) A Berasategui (Mexico) D Roditi	3	3
(South Africa) **D Adams** **(South Africa) W Ferreira**	**6**	**6**

Quarterfinals
10	(India) **M Bhupathi** **(India) L Paes**	**6**	**7**
(South Africa) D Adams (South Africa) W Ferreira	4	6
