= 1997 US Open – Women's doubles =

Women's doubles
- 1997 US Open

Final
- Champions: (United States) Lindsay Davenport (Czech Republic) Jana Novotná
- Runners-up: (United States) Gigi Fernández (Belarus) Natasha Zvereva
- Score: 6–3, 6–4

Details
- Draw: 64 (4 Q / 4 WC )
- Seeds: 16

Events
Singles	men	women		boys	girls
Doubles	men	women	mixed	boys	girls
WC Singles	men	women	quad
WC Doubles	men	women	quad
Legends	men	women	mixed
← 1996 ·	US Open	· 1998 →

Lindsay Davenport and Jana Novotná defeated the defending champions Gigi Fernández and Natasha Zvereva in the final, 6–3, 6–4 to win the women's doubles tennis title at the 1997 US Open. It was the 17th doubles title and second major title for Davenport, and the 67th title and ninth major title for Novotná.

This was the first major in which sisters Venus and Serena Williams competed, losing in the first round.

Zvereva made the finals of all 4 grand slam tournaments for the second time in her career, but fell short of winning the Calendar Grand Slam with this loss. This would also be Fernández’s last women’s doubles grand slam tournament, ending a 6-year streak of making the quarterfinals or better in 24 consecutive slams and winning 14 of her total 17 women’s double grand slam titles.

== Seeds ==
1. (United States) Gigi Fernández / (Belarus) Natasha Zvereva (final)
2. (Switzerland) Martina Hingis / (Spain) Arantxa Sánchez Vicario (semifinals)
3. (United States) Lindsay Davenport / (Czech Republic) Jana Novotná (champions)
4. (United States) Nicole Arendt / (Netherlands) Manon Bollegraf (semifinals)
5. (Latvia) Larisa Neiland / (Czech Republic) Helena Suková (third round, retired)
6. (Indonesia) Yayuk Basuki / (Netherlands) Caroline Vis (quarterfinals)
7. (France) Alexandra Fusai / (France) Nathalie Tauziat (quarterfinals)
8. (Spain) Conchita Martínez / (Argentina) Patricia Tarabini (quarterfinals, retired)
9. (Japan) Naoko Kijimuta / (Japan) Nana Miyagi (third round)
10. (United States) Lisa Raymond / (Australia) Rennae Stubbs (third round)
11. (Belgium) Sabine Appelmans / (Netherlands) Miriam Oremans (first round)
12. (United States) Mary Joe Fernández / (Germany) Anke Huber (third round)
13. (United States) Amy Frazier / (United States) Kimberly Po (third round)
14. (United States) Katrina Adams / (Netherlands) Kristie Boogert (third round)
15. (Russia) Anna Kournikova / (Russia) Elena Likhovtseva (third round)
16. (Romania) Ruxandra Dragomir / (Croatia) Iva Majoli (quarterfinals)

== Draw ==
=== Key ===
- Q = Qualifier
- WC = Wild card
- LL = Lucky loser
- Alt = Alternate
- ITF = ITF entry
- PR = Protected ranking
- SR = Special ranking
- SE = Special exempt
- JE = Junior exempt
- JR = Junior Accelerator Programme entrant
- CO = College Accelerator Programme entrant
- NG = Next Gen Accelerator Program entrant
- w/o = Walkover
- r = Retired
- d = Defaulted

=== Finals ===
Quarterfinals
1	(United States) Gigi Fernández (Belarus) Natasha Zvereva	4	6	6
7	(France) Alexandra Fusai (France) Nathalie Tauziat	6	2	2
4	(United States) Nicole Arendt (Netherlands) Manon Bollegraf	6	3	6
16	(Romania) Ruxandra Dragomir (Croatia) Iva Majoli	3	6	4
6	(Indonesia) Yayuk Basuki (Netherlands) Caroline Vis	3	5
3	(United States) Lindsay Davenport (Czech Republic) Jana Novotná	6	7
8	(Spain) Conchita Martínez (Argentina) Patricia Tarabini	0^{r}
2	(Switzerland) Martina Hingis (Spain) Arantxa Sánchez Vicario	4

Semifinals
1	(United States) Gigi Fernández (Belarus) Natasha Zvereva	3	7	6
4	(United States) Nicole Arendt (Netherlands) Manon Bollegraf	6	6	2
3	(United States) Lindsay Davenport (Czech Republic) Jana Novotná	6	6
2	(Switzerland) Martina Hingis (Spain) Arantxa Sánchez Vicario	4	3

Final
1	(United States) Gigi Fernández (Belarus) Natasha Zvereva	3	4
3	(United States) Lindsay Davenport (Czech Republic) Jana Novotná	6	6

=== Top half ===
==== Section 1 ====
First round
1	(United States) G Fernández (Belarus) N Zvereva	6	6
(United Kingdom) J Pullin (United Kingdom) L Woodroffe	4	4
(Germany) W Probst (Japan) A Sugiyama	6	6
Q	(Czech Republic) L Richterová (Bulgaria) P Stoyanova	1	3
(Canada) J Hetherington (United States) K Rinaldi-Stunkel	6	7
WC	(United States) S Williams (United States) V Williams	4	5
(Czech Republic) L Němečková (Netherlands) S Noorlander	1	2
10	(United States) L Raymond (Australia) R Stubbs	6	6
12	(United States) MJ Fernández (Germany) A Huber	6	6
(Ukraine) O Lugina (Bulgaria) E Pampoulova	1	3
(Poland) A Olsza (Slovakia) K Studeníková	1	5
(Spain) V Ruano Pascual (Argentina) P Suárez	6	7
(United States) C Rubin (Netherlands) B Schultz-McCarthy	1	5
(Canada) S Jeyaseelan (Canada) R Simpson	6	7
WC	(United States) D Buth (United States) S Nickitas	7	3	2
7	(France) A Fusai (France) N Tauziat	6	6	6

Second round
1	(United States) G Fernández (Belarus) N Zvereva	6	6
(Germany) W Probst (Japan) A Sugiyama	1	4
(Canada) J Hetherington (United States) K Rinaldi-Stunkel	1	7	3
10	(United States) L Raymond (Australia) R Stubbs	6	5	6
12	(United States) MJ Fernández (Germany) A Huber	6	6
(Spain) V Ruano Pascual (Argentina) P Suárez	2	4
(Canada) S Jeyaseelan (Canada) R Simpson	6	2
7	(France) A Fusai (France) N Tauziat	7	6

Third round
1	(United States) G Fernández (Belarus) N Zvereva	6	6
10	(United States) L Raymond (Australia) R Stubbs	3	4
12	(United States) MJ Fernández (Germany) A Huber	6	3	1
7	(France) A Fusai (France) N Tauziat	4	6	6

Quarterfinals
1	(United States) G Fernández (Belarus) N Zvereva	4	6	6
7	(France) A Fusai (France) N Tauziat	6	2	2

==== Section 2 ====
First round
4	(United States) N Arendt (Netherlands) M Bollegraf	6	6
(United States) C Morariu (Croatia) M Murić	4	4
(South Korea) S-h Park (Thailand) T Tanasugarn	7	6
(Australia) C Barclay (United Kingdom) C Wood	6	4
(Romania) C Cristea (Poland) M Grzybowska	6	6
(Germany) K Freye (France) N van Lottum	2	4
(Czech Republic) E Melicharová (Czech Republic) H Vildová	0	3
13	(United States) A Frazier (United States) K Po	6	6
16	(Romania) R Dragomir (Croatia) I Majoli	6	7
(Austria) B Schett (United Kingdom) S-A Siddall	4	5
(Italy) L Garrone (Italy) G Pizzichini	4	4
(Ukraine) N Medvedeva (Ukraine) E Tatarkova	6	6
(Australia) KA Guse (Australia) R McQuillan	6	6
WC	(United States) M Irvin (United States) A Stevenson	1	4
(Belgium) E Callens (United States) G Helgeson-Nielsen	3	5
5	(Latvia) L Neiland (Czech Republic) H Suková	6	7

Second round
4	(United States) N Arendt (Netherlands) M Bollegraf	7	6
(South Korea) S-h Park (Thailand) T Tanasugarn	6	4
(Romania) C Cristea (Poland) M Grzybowska	4	5
13	(United States) A Frazier (United States) K Po	6	7
16	(Romania) R Dragomir (Croatia) I Majoli	6	4	6
(Ukraine) N Medvedeva (Ukraine) E Tatarkova	2	6	4
(Australia) KA Guse (Australia) R McQuillan	4	4
5	(Latvia) L Neiland (Czech Republic) H Suková	6	6

Third round
4	(United States) N Arendt (Netherlands) M Bollegraf	6	6
13	(United States) A Frazier (United States) K Po	4	2
16	(Romania) R Dragomir (Croatia) I Majoli	5
5	(Latvia) L Neiland (Czech Republic) H Suková	2^{r}

Quarterfinals
4	(United States) N Arendt (Netherlands) M Bollegraf	6	3	6
16	(Romania) R Dragomir (Croatia) I Majoli	3	6	4

=== Bottom half ===
==== Section 3 ====
First round
6	(Indonesia) Y Basuki (Netherlands) C Vis	2	6	6
(Sweden) Å Carlsson (Canada) P Hy-Boulais	6	3	1
(United States) A Grossman (Slovakia) K Habšudová	3	2
Q	(Australia) L McShea (United Kingdom) A Wainwright	6	6
(United States) J Lee (United States) L Lee	3	5
(Argentina) L Montalvo (Australia) L Pleming	6	7
(Australia) A Ellwood (Australia) K Kunce	6	6
11	(Belgium) S Appelmans (Netherlands) M Oremans	2	2
9	(Japan) N Kijimuta (Japan) N Miyagi	6	6
(Italy) R Grande (United States) L Wild	3	3
(Japan) R Hiraki (France) AG Sidot	6	6
(Australia) D Jones (United States) T Whitlinger-Jones	1	4
(Germany) B Rittner (Belgium) D van Roost	6	5
(France) A Dechaume-Balleret (France) S Testud	7	7
WC	(United States) Z Garrison-Jackson (United States) L McNeil	2	6	3
3	(United States) L Davenport (Czech Republic) J Novotná	6	4	6

Second round
6	(Indonesia) Y Basuki (Netherlands) C Vis	6	7
Q	(Australia) L McShea (United Kingdom) A Wainwright	2	6
(Argentina) L Montalvo (Australia) L Pleming	4	1
(Australia) A Ellwood (Australia) K Kunce	6	6
9	(Japan) N Kijimuta (Japan) N Miyagi	2
(Japan) R Hiraki (France) AG Sidot	1^{r}
(France) A Dechaume-Balleret (France) S Testud	6	2
3	(United States) L Davenport (Czech Republic) J Novotná	7	6

Third round
6	(Indonesia) Y Basuki (Netherlands) C Vis	6	6
(Australia) A Ellwood (Australia) K Kunce	0	4
9	(Japan) N Kijimuta (Japan) N Miyagi	7	2	2
3	(United States) L Davenport (Czech Republic) J Novotná	6	6	6

Quarterfinals
6	(Indonesia) Y Basuki (Netherlands) C Vis	3	5
3	(United States) L Davenport (Czech Republic) J Novotná	6	7

==== Section 4 ====
First round
8	(Spain) C Martínez (Argentina) P Tarabini	6	6
Q	(United States) C Moros (United States) J Scott	2	3
(South Africa) M de Swardt (United States) D Graham	6	6
(Czech Republic) P Langrová (Slovakia) R Zrubáková	1	3
(Argentina) F Labat (Argentina) M Paz	6	6
(United States) A Lettiere (United States) M Tu	1	3
(Japan) M Saeki (Japan) Y Yoshida	2	5
14	(United States) K Adams (Netherlands) K Boogert	6	7
15	(Russia) A Kournikova (Russia) E Likhovtseva	6	6	6
Q	(United States) A Miller (United States) J Steven	2	7	4
(Slovenia) T Križan (Czech Republic) E Martincová	5	4
(Germany) M Babel (Italy) L Golarsa	7	6
(Slovakia) H Nagyová (Switzerland) P Schnyder	0	1
(South Africa) A Coetzer (France) M Pierce	6	6
(Argentina) I Gorrochategui (Romania) I Spîrlea	3	1
2	(Switzerland) M Hingis (Spain) A Sánchez Vicario	6	6

Second round
8	(Spain) C Martínez (Argentina) P Tarabini	7	4	6
(South Africa) M de Swardt (United States) D Graham	6	6	4
(Argentina) F Labat (Argentina) M Paz	2	3
14	(United States) K Adams (Netherlands) K Boogert	6	6
15	(Russia) A Kournikova (Russia) E Likhovtseva	5	6	6
(Germany) M Babel (Italy) L Golarsa	7	3	3
(South Africa) A Coetzer (France) M Pierce	4	2
2	(Switzerland) M Hingis (Spain) A Sánchez Vicario	6	6

Third round
8	(Spain) C Martínez (Argentina) P Tarabini	6	6	6
14	(United States) K Adams (Netherlands) K Boogert	4	7	4
15	(Russia) A Kournikova (Russia) E Likhovtseva	4	4
2	(Switzerland) M Hingis (Spain) A Sánchez Vicario	6	6

Quarterfinals
8	(Spain) C Martínez (Argentina) P Tarabini	0^{r}
2	(Switzerland) M Hingis (Spain) A Sánchez Vicario	4
