= 1997 US Open – Men's singles =

Men's singles
- 1997 US Open

Final
- Champion: (Australia) Pat Rafter
- Runner-up: (United Kingdom) Greg Rusedski
- Score: 6–3, 6–2, 4–6, 7–5

Details
- Draw: 128
- Seeds: 16

Events
Singles	men	women		boys	girls
Doubles	men	women	mixed	boys	girls
WC Singles	men	women	quad
WC Doubles	men	women	quad
Legends	men	women	mixed
- US Open

Pat Rafter defeated Greg Rusedski in the final, 6–3, 6–2, 4–6, 7–5 to win the men's singles tennis title at the 1997 US Open. It was his first major singles title. Rafter was the first Australian to win the title since John Newcombe in 1973.

Pete Sampras was the two-time defending champion, but lost in the fourth round to Petr Korda.

This marked Rusedski's first and only major final, which he dedicated to Diana, Princess of Wales, who had died a week earlier.

== Seeds ==
1. (United States) Pete Sampras (fourth round)
2. (United States) Michael Chang (semifinals)
3. (Russia) Yevgeny Kafelnikov (second round)
4. (Croatia) Goran Ivanišević (first round)
5. (Austria) Thomas Muster (first round)
6. (Spain) Àlex Corretja (third round)
7. (Spain) Sergi Bruguera (fourth round)
8. (Spain) Carlos Moyà (first round)
9. (Brazil) Gustavo Kuerten (third round)
10. (Chile) Marcelo Ríos (quarterfinals)
11. (Sweden) Thomas Enqvist (withdrew)
12. (Spain) Félix Mantilla (fourth round)
13. (Australia) Pat Rafter (champion)
14. (Australia) Mark Philippoussis (third round)
15. (Czech Republic) Petr Korda (quarterfinals)
16. (Spain) Albert Costa (first round)

== Draw ==
Key

- Q = Qualifier
- WC = Wild card
- LL = Lucky loser
- Alt = Alternate
- ITF = ITF entry
- PR = Protected ranking
- SR = Special ranking
- SE = Special exempt
- JE = Junior exempt
- JR = Junior Accelerator Programme entrant
- CO = College Accelerator Programme entrant
- NG = Next Gen Accelerator Program entrant
- w/o = Walkover
- r = Retired
- d = Defaulted

=== Finals ===
Quarterfinals
15	(Czech Republic) Petr Korda	6^{3}	2	0^{r}
(Sweden) Jonas Björkman	7^{7}	6	1
(United Kingdom) Greg Rusedski	7	7^{7}	7^{8}
(Netherlands) Richard Krajicek	5	6^{5}	6^{6}
(Sweden) Magnus Larsson	6^{4}	4	2
13	(Australia) Pat Rafter	7^{7}	6	6
10	(Chile) Marcelo Ríos	5	2	6	6	3
2	(United States) Michael Chang	7	6	4	4	6

Semifinals
(Sweden) Jonas Björkman	1	6	6	3	5
(United Kingdom) Greg Rusedski	6	3	3	6	7
13	(Australia) Pat Rafter	6	6	6
2	(United States) Michael Chang	3	3	4

Final
(United Kingdom) Greg Rusedski	3	2	6	5
13	(Australia) Pat Rafter	6	6	4	7

=== Top half ===
==== Section 1 ====
First round
1	(United States) P Sampras	6	6	6
Q	(Australia) T Larkham	3	1	3
Q	(Germany) P Baur	4	3	6	6	6
Q	(Brazil) J Oncins	6	6	4	3	3
(Australia) R Fromberg	6	6	6^{8}	6
(United States) P McEnroe	2	2	7^{10}	3
(Germany) A Rădulescu	3	6	7^{7}	6
Q	(Uzbekistan) O Ogorodov	6	4	6^{5}	1
(Spain) J A Viloca	6	2	1	2
(New Zealand) B Steven	4	6	6	6
Q	(United States) T Ho	3	4	7^{7}	4
(Czech Republic) M Damm	6	6	6^{5}	6
(Italy) M Martelli	6	7^{7}	6
(Germany) H Dreekmann	1	6^{5}	3
(United States) V Spadea	6	5	6^{1}	4
15	(Czech Republic) P Korda	2	7	7^{7}	6

Second round
1	(United States) P Sampras	7	6	6
Q	(Germany) P Baur	5	4	3
(Australia) R Fromberg	6	4	3	6	4
(Germany) A Rădulescu	3	6	6	3	6
(New Zealand) B Steven	4	4	6	6^{4}
(Czech Republic) M Damm	6	6	3	7^{7}
(Italy) M Martelli	3	6^{4}	6^{5}
15	(Czech Republic) P Korda	6	7^{7}	7^{7}

Third round
1	(United States) P Sampras	6	6	6
(Germany) A Rădulescu	3	4	4
(Czech Republic) M Damm	6	3	4	5
15	(Czech Republic) P Korda	4	6	6	7

Fourth round
1	(United States) P Sampras	7^{7}	5	6^{2}	6	6^{3}
15	(Czech Republic) P Korda	6^{4}	7	7^{7}	3	7^{7}

==== Section 2 ====
First round
9	(Brazil) G Kuerten	6	3	6^{4}	6	6
Q	(United States) G Grant	4	6	7^{7}	2	3
(Netherlands) D van Scheppingen	4	3	4
(Netherlands) S Schalken	6	6	6
(Spain) F Clavet	2	4	4
(Sweden) J Björkman	6	6	6
(United States) T Martin	3	6	6	6
(United States) J Courier	6	3	4	2
(Czech Republic) J Novák	5	6	7^{11}	6
(Italy) D Sanguinetti	7	2	6^{9}	2
WC	(United States) J-M Gambill	4	3	6^{11}
(Australia) S Draper	6	6	7^{13}
(Germany) D Prinosil	4	2	5
(United States) J Tarango	6	6	7
(France) G Raoux	6	7^{7}	6
8	(Spain) C Moyà	4	6^{2}	2

Second round
9	(Brazil) G Kuerten	6	6	6
(Netherlands) S Schalken	4	4	2
(Sweden) J Björkman	7	6	6
(United States) T Martin	5	4	0
(Czech Republic) J Novák	5	6^{4}	6	3
(Australia) S Draper	7	7^{7}	3	6
(United States) J Tarango	6	6^{6}	6^{3}	6	6
(France) G Raoux	4	7^{8}	7^{7}	2	4

Third round
9	(Brazil) G Kuerten	3	1	5
(Sweden) J Björkman	6	6	7
(Australia) S Draper	7^{8}	3	2	6	6
(United States) J Tarango	6^{6}	6	6	4	4

Fourth round
(Sweden) J Björkman	6	6	1	7^{8}
(Australia) S Draper	3	3	6	6^{6}

==== Section 3 ====
First round
4	(Croatia) G Ivanišević	6	5	1	6^{3}
(Romania) D Pescariu	4	7	6	7^{7}
(Germany) J Knippschild	7	5	6	6^{5}	6
(Czech Republic) S Doseděl	5	7	4	7^{7}	4
(France) F Santoro	7	4	6	2	3
(South Africa) M Ondruska	5	6	4	6	6
(United Kingdom) G Rusedski	6	6	6
WC	(United States) D Wheaton	2	3	3
Q	(Italy) L Tieleman	6	4	6	3	2
(Czech Republic) D Vacek	4	6	1	6	6
Q	(United States) M Sell	6	3	6	7
WC	(Philippines) C Mamiit	3	6	4	5
(France) J Golmard	6	1	7^{7}	4	7
(Morocco) H Arazi	4	6	6^{4}	6	5
(Morocco) K Alami	3	4	6	4
14	(Australia) M Philippoussis	6	6	3	6

Second round
(Romania) D Pescariu	3	5	1
(Germany) J Knippschild	6	7	6
(South Africa) M Ondruska	6^{3}	4	1
(United Kingdom) G Rusedski	7^{7}	6	6
(Czech Republic) D Vacek	4	7^{7}	6	6
Q	(United States) M Sell	6	6^{5}	1	2
(France) J Golmard	6^{5}	2	0^{r}
14	(Australia) M Philippoussis	7^{7}	6	1

Third round
(Germany) J Knippschild	6^{5}	3	1
(United Kingdom) G Rusedski	7^{7}	6	6
(Czech Republic) D Vacek	7^{7}	7	6
14	(Australia) M Philippoussis	6^{4}	5	2

Fourth round
(United Kingdom) G Rusedski	7^{7}	6	6
(Czech Republic) D Vacek	6^{2}	2	2

==== Section 4 ====
First round
12	(Spain) F Mantilla	7^{7}	6	6
(Australia) J Stoltenberg	6^{4}	3	2
(Spain) J Sánchez	7	6	7
(Spain) A Portas	5	2	5
Q	(Netherlands) J van Lottum	6	6	2	6
(United States) R Reneberg	1	4	6	4
(Belgium) J Van Herck	6	4	7^{7}	7^{7}
(Belgium) F Dewulf	4	6	6^{3}	6^{5}
(Uruguay) M Filippini	6	6	6
(United States) A O'Brien	2	4	4
Q	(Zimbabwe) W Black	4	2	2
(Netherlands) R Krajicek	6	6	6
WC	(Peru) R Rake	2	3	2
(Czech Republic) B Ulihrach	6	6	6
(Switzerland) M Rosset	6	3	2	2
6	(Spain) À Corretja	4	6	6	6

Second round
12	(Spain) F Mantilla	7	6	6
(Spain) J Sánchez	5	4	2
Q	(Netherlands) J van Lottum	6	6	6
(Belgium) J Van Herck	3	4	4
(Uruguay) M Filippini	6^{4}	2	5
(Netherlands) R Krajicek	7^{7}	6	7
(Czechoslovakia) B Ulihrach	5	4	6	4
6	(Spain) À Corretja	7	6	3	6

Third round
12	(Spain) F Mantilla	6^{1}	6	4	7^{7}	6
Q	(Netherlands) J van Lottum	7^{7}	2	6	6^{5}	2
(Netherlands) R Krajicek
6	(Spain) À Corretja	w/o

Fourth round
12	(Spain) F Mantilla	5	3	4
(Netherlands) R Krajicek	7	6	6

=== Bottom half ===
==== Section 5 ====
First round
5	(Austria) T Muster	3	6^{3}	6	4
(United Kingdom) T Henman	6	7^{7}	4	6
(Spain) A Berasategui	7^{7}	6	3	1	3
(South Africa) W Ferreira	6^{0}	2	6	6	6
(United States) J Gimelstob	7^{9}	6^{3}	6	6
Q	(Canada) D Nestor	6^{7}	7^{7}	3	2
(United States) J Stark	3	2	5
(Sweden) M Gustafsson	6	6	7
(Norway) C Ruud	6	4	1	6	6
(Germany) M-K Goellner	4	6	6	4	3
(Brazil) F Meligeni	6	6	6
Q	(Venezuela) J Szymanski	2	2	1
(Netherlands) J Siemerink	4	2	3
(Sweden) M Larsson	6	6	6
WC	(United States) M Joyce	6^{5}	6	3	1
LL	(France) N Escudé	7^{7}	4	6	6

Second round
(United Kingdom) T Henman	3	2	4
(South Africa) W Ferreira	6	6	6
(United States) J Gimelstob	6	3	7^{7}	4	6
(Sweden) M Gustafsson	3	6	6^{4}	6	1
(Norway) C Ruud	3	4	3
(Brazil) F Meligeni	6	6	6
(Sweden) M Larsson	6	6	7^{7}
LL	(France) N Escudé	4	2	6^{3}

Third round
(South Africa) W Ferreira	5	7^{7}	6	6
(United States) J Gimelstob	7	6^{3}	3	0
(Brazil) F Meligeni	2	4	3
(Sweden) M Larsson	6	6	6

Fourth round
(South Africa) W Ferreira	3	6^{5}	3
(Sweden) M Larsson	6	7^{7}	6

==== Section 6 ====
First round
13	(Australia) P Rafter	6	6	7
(Ukraine) A Medvedev	3	4	5
(Slovakia) K Kučera	7^{7}	4	2	3
(Sweden) M Norman	6^{5}	6	6	6
(Netherlands) P Haarhuis	7^{8}	6	6^{5}	6^{3}	6
(Spain) G Blanco	6^{6}	0	7^{7}	7^{7}	3
(Austria) G Schaller	6	6	3	2	1
(France) L Roux	4	0	6	6	6
(Italy) R Furlan	7^{7}	6^{5}	4	7^{7}	3
(Romania) A Voinea	6^{2}	7^{7}	6	6^{4}	6
WC	(United States) S Campbell	1	1	6	3
(United States) A Agassi	6	6	4	6
(Australia) M Woodforde	7^{7}	6	6
(Zimbabwe) B Black	6^{3}	3	2
Q	(Italy) C Caratti	2	4	6^{4}
3	(Russia) Y Kafelnikov	6	6	7^{7}

Second round
13	(Australia) P Rafter	6	6	6
(Sweden) M Norman	2	1	2
(Netherlands) P Haarhuis	6^{5}	3	7^{7}	7^{7}	4
(France) L Roux	7^{7}	6	6^{5}	6^{3}	6
(Romania) A Voinea	0	2	2
(United States) A Agassi	6	6	6
(Australia) M Woodforde	6	6	7^{7}
3	(Russia) Y Kafelnikov	3	4	6^{4}

Third round
13	(Australia) P Rafter	6	6	6
(France) L Roux	1	1	2
(United States) A Agassi	6	6	6
(Australia) M Woodforde	2	2	4

Fourth round
13	(Australia) P Rafter	6	7^{7}	4	6
(United States) A Agassi	3	6^{4}	6	3

==== Section 7 ====
First round
7	(Spain) S Bruguera	3	4	6	6	6
Q	(Australia) M Tebbutt	6	6	3	2	2
(South Africa) G Stafford	6	6	6
(Spain) E Benfele Álvarez	4	2	2
(Argentina) H Gumy	6^{6}	6	6^{9}	6	6
(Slovakia) D Hrbatý	7^{8}	3	7^{11}	3	2
(Australia) T Woodbridge	7^{7}	6	4	6
(Spain) J A Marín	6^{3}	3	6	1
(Slovakia) J Krošlák	3	7^{7}	6	6
(Russia) A Volkov	6	6^{4}	0	1
(Germany) T Haas	6	6	2	6
(Germany) O Gross	3	4	6	4
(Denmark) K Carlsen	6	6	6
Q	(Finland) T Ketola	2	3	1
WC	(Australia) L Smith	1	1	4
10	(Chile) M Ríos	6	6	6

Second round
7	(Spain) S Bruguera	6	6	7^{7}
(South Africa) G Stafford	4	2	6^{3}
(Argentina) H Gumy	7	6	6
(Australia) T Woodbridge	5	4	2
(Slovakia) J Krošlák	4	1	2
(Germany) T Haas	6	6	6
(Denmark) K Carlsen	4	7	6	1	6^{3}
10	(Chile) M Ríos	6	5	3	6	7^{7}

Third round
7	(Spain) S Bruguera	6	6	5	3	6
(Argentina) H Gumy	1	4	7	6	4
(Germany) T Haas	4	6	3	6	1
10	(Chile) M Ríos	6	3	6	1	6

Fourth round
7	(Spain) S Bruguera	5	2	4
10	(Chile) M Ríos	7	6	6

==== Section 8 ====
First round
16	(Spain) A Costa	2	4	4
(France) A Boetsch	6	6	6
(Spain) C Costa	1	5	4
(India) L Paes	6	7	6
(France) C Pioline	6	6	6
Q	(Netherlands) P Wessels	4	2	2
(Romania) A Pavel	4	0^{r}
(Ecuador) N Lapentti	6	5
(Spain) J Alonso	6	6	0	4	4
(Armenia) S Sargsian	2	0	6	6	6
(Sweden) T Johansson	3	0	6	0
(United States) C Woodruff	6	6	3	6
WC	(United States) J Salzenstein	6	1	7^{7}	7
(Sweden) M Tillström	4	6	6^{5}	5
(Sweden) P Fredriksson	3	4	2
2	(United States) M Chang	6	6	6

Second round
(France) A Boetsch	4	0	1^{r}
(India) L Paes	6	6	2
(France) C Pioline	6	6	6
(Ecuador) N Lapentti	0	4	2
(Armenia) S Sargsian
(United States) C Woodruff	w/o
WC	(United States) J Salzenstein	6	2	3	4
2	(United States) M Chang	4	6	6	6

Third round
(India) L Paes	6	6^{5}	6	3	4
(France) C Pioline	3	7^{7}	1	6	6
(Armenia) S Sargsian	1	3	5
2	(United States) M Chang	6	6	7

Fourth round
(France) C Pioline	3	6	7	5	1
2	(United States) M Chang	6	0	5	7	6

Preceded by 1997 Wimbledon Championships – Men's singles	Grand Slam men's singles	Succeeded by 1998 Australian Open – Men's singles
