= 1997 US Open (tennis) =

- Date: August 25 – September 7
- Edition: 117th
- Category: Grand Slam (ITF)
- Surface: Hardcourt
- Location: New York City, New York, United States

Champions

Men's singles
- (Australia) Patrick Rafter

Women's singles
- (Switzerland) Martina Hingis

Men's doubles
- (Russia) Yevgeny Kafelnikov / (Czech Republic) Daniel Vacek

Women's doubles
- (United States) Lindsay Davenport / (Czech Republic) Jana Novotná

Mixed doubles
- (Netherlands) Manon Bollegraf / (United States) Rick Leach

Boys' singles
- (France) Arnaud di Pasquale

Girls' singles
- (Zimbabwe) Cara Black

Boys' doubles
- (Chile) Fernando González / (Chile) Nicolás Massú

Girls' doubles
- (United States) Marissa Irvin / (United States) Alexandra Stevenson
← 1996 ·	US Open	· 1998 →

The 1997 US Open was a tennis tournament played on outdoor hard courts at the USTA National Tennis Center in New York City in New York in the United States. It was the 117th edition of the US Open and was held from August 25 through September 7, 1997.

This was the first year to use Arthur Ashe Stadium as the primary stadium, replacing Louis Armstrong Stadium.

== Seniors ==
=== Men's singles ===
(Australia) Patrick Rafter defeated (United Kingdom) Greg Rusedski 6–3, 6–2, 4–6, 7–5

- It was Rafter's 1st career Grand Slam title and his 1st US Open title.

=== Women's singles ===
(Switzerland) Martina Hingis defeated (United States) Venus Williams 6–0, 6–4

- It was Hingis' 3rd career Grand Slam title and her 1st US Open title.

=== Men's doubles ===
(Russia) Yevgeny Kafelnikov / (Czech Republic) Daniel Vacek defeated (Sweden) Jonas Björkman / (Sweden) Nicklas Kulti 7–6^{(10–8)}, 6–3

- It was Kafelnikov's 4th career Grand Slam title and his only US Open title. It was Vacek's 3rd and last career Grand Slam title and his only US Open title.

=== Women's doubles ===
(United States) Lindsay Davenport / (Czech Republic) Jana Novotná defeated (United States) Gigi Fernández / (Belarus) Natasha Zvereva 6–3, 6–4

- It was Davenport's 2nd career Grand Slam title and her 1st US Open title. It was Novotná's 13th career Grand Slam title and her 3rd US Open title.

=== Mixed doubles ===
(Netherlands) Manon Bollegraf / (United States) Rick Leach defeated (Argentina) Mercedes Paz / (Argentina) Pablo Albano 3–6, 7–5, 7–6^{(7–3)}

- It was Bollegraf's 4th and last career Grand Slam title and her 2nd US Open title. It was Leach's 8th career Grand Slam title and his 2nd and last US Open title.

== Juniors ==
=== Boys' singles ===
(France) Arnaud Di Pasquale defeated (South Africa) Wesley Whitehouse 6–7, 6–4, 6–1

=== Girls' singles ===
(Zimbabwe) Cara Black defeated (France) Kildine Chevalier 6–7^{(5–7)}, 6–1, 6–3

=== Boys' doubles ===
(Chile) Fernando González / (Chile) Nicolás Massú defeated (France) Jean-René Lisnard / (France) Michaël Llodra 6–4, 6–4

=== Girls' doubles ===
(United States) Marissa Irvin / (United States) Alexandra Stevenson defeated (Zimbabwe) Cara Black / (Kazakhstan) Irina Selyutina 6–2, 7–6

Preceded by 1997 Wimbledon Championships	Grand Slams	Succeeded by 1998 Australian Open
