= 1996 International ÖTV Raiffeisen Grand Prix – Doubles =

Doubles
- 1996 International ÖTV Raiffeisen Grand Prix
- 1995 Champions: (United States) Bill Behrens (United States) Matt Lucena

Final
- Champions: (Czech Republic) Ctislav Doseděl (Czech Republic) Pavel Vízner
- Runners-up: (South Africa) David Adams (Netherlands) Menno Oosting
- Score: 6–7, 6–4, 6–3

Events
| Singles | Doubles |
| ← 1995 · | International ÖTV Raiffeisen Grand Prix | · 1997 → |

Bill Behrens and Matt Lucena were the defending champions but only Behrens competed that year with Kelly Jones.

Behrens and Jones lost in the first round to Rikard Bergh and Shelby Cannon.

Ctislav Doseděl and Pavel Vízner won in the final 6–7, 6–4, 6–3 against David Adams and Menno Oosting.

== Seeds ==
Champion seeds are indicated in bold text while text in italics indicates the round in which those seeds were eliminated.

1. (Argentina) Luis Lobo / (Spain) Javier Sánchez (quarterfinals)
2. (Belgium) Libor Pimek / (South Africa) Byron Talbot (semifinals)
3. (South Africa) David Adams / (Netherlands) Menno Oosting (final)
4. (United States) Jim Grabb / (South Africa) Gary Muller (first round)

== Draw ==
=== Key ===
- Q = Qualifier
- WC = Wild card
- LL = Lucky loser
- Alt = Alternate
- SE = Special exempt
- PR = Protected ranking
- ITF = ITF entry
- JE = Junior exempt
- w/o = Walkover
- r = Retired
- d = Defaulted
- SR = Special ranking

First round
1 | (Argentina) **L Lobo** (Spain) **J Sánchez** | **7** | **6**
Q | (Australia) S Draper (Australia) P Kilderry | 6 | 4
(Netherlands) S Noteboom (United States) J Waite | 5 | 6
WC | (Czech Republic) **C Doseděl** (Czech Republic) **P Vízner** | **7** | **7**
4 | (United States) J Grabb (South Africa) G Muller | 4 | 4
(United States) **L Jensen** (United States) **M Jensen** | **6** | **6**
(Netherlands) T Kempers (Netherlands) T Nijssen | 4 | 4
(Australia) **J Eagle** (Australia) **A Florent** | **6** | **6**
WC | (Sweden) P Lundgren (Chile) M Ríos | 3 | **7** | 4
(United States) **K Flach** (United States) **D Wheaton** | **6** | 5 | **6**
(South Africa) B Haygarth (South Africa) C van Rensburg | **6** | 3 | 4
3 | (South Africa) **D Adams** (Netherlands) **M Oosting** | 2 | **6** | **6**
(United States) B Behrens (United States) K Jones | 2 | **6** | 6
(Sweden) **R Bergh** (United States) **S Cannon** | **6** | 2 | **7**
WC | (Austria) W Schranz (Austria) C Trimmel | **6** | 3 | 6
2 | (Belgium) **L Pimek** (South Africa) **B Talbot** | 4 | **6** | **7**

Quarterfinals
1 | (Argentina) L Lobo (Spain) J Sánchez | 6 | 2
WC | (Czech Republic) **C Doseděl** (Czech Republic) **P Vízner** | **7** | **6**
(United States) **L Jensen** (United States) **M Jensen** | **6** | **6**
(Australia) J Eagle (Australia) A Florent | 3 | 4
(United States) K Flach (United States) D Wheaton | 6 | 6
3 | (South Africa) **D Adams** (Netherlands) **M Oosting** | **7** | **7**
(Sweden) R Bergh (United States) S Cannon | 4 | 2
2 | (Belgium) **L Pimek** (South Africa) **B Talbot** | **6** | **6**

Semifinals
WC | (Czech Republic) **C Doseděl** (Czech Republic) **P Vízner** | 3 | **6** | **6**
(United States) L Jensen (United States) M Jensen | **6** | 3 | 4
3 | (South Africa) **D Adams** (Netherlands) **M Oosting** | **6** | **6**
2 | (Belgium) L Pimek (South Africa) B Talbot | 3 | 3

Final
WC | (Czech Republic) **Ctislav Doseděl** (Czech Republic) **Pavel Vízner** | 6 | **6** | **6**
3 | (South Africa) David Adams (Netherlands) Menno Oosting | **7** | 4 | 3
