= 1996 International ÖTV Raiffeisen Grand Prix – Singles =

Singles
- 1996 International ÖTV Raiffeisen Grand Prix
- 1995 Champion: (Austria) Thomas Muster

Final
- Champion: (Chile) Marcelo Ríos
- Runner-up: (Spain) Félix Mantilla
- Score: 6–2, 6–4

Details
- Draw: 32
- Seeds: 8

Events
Singles	Doubles
← 1995 ·	International ÖTV Raiffeisen Grand Prix	· 1997 →

Thomas Muster was the defending champion but lost in the quarterfinals to Andrea Gaudenzi.

Marcelo Ríos won in the final 6–2, 6–4 against Félix Mantilla.

== Seeds ==
A champion seed is indicated in bold text while text in italics indicates the round in which that seed was eliminated.

1. (Austria) Thomas Muster (quarterfinals)
2. (Chile) **Marcelo Ríos (champion)**
3. (Zimbabwe) Byron Black (second round)
4. (Austria) Gilbert Schaller (first round)
5. (Spain) Alberto Berasategui (first round)
6. (Czech Republic) Ctislav Doseděl (semifinals)
7. (Spain) Francisco Clavet (quarterfinals)
8. (Italy) Andrea Gaudenzi (semifinals)

== Draw ==
=== Key ===
- Q = Qualifier
- WC = Wild card
- LL = Lucky loser
- Alt = Alternate
- SE = Special exempt
- PR = Protected ranking
- ITF = ITF entry
- JE = Junior exempt
- w/o = Walkover
- r = Retired
- d = Defaulted
- SR = Special ranking

First round
1	(Austria) **T Muster**	**6**	**6**
WC	(Qatar) N-G Al-Khulaifi	0	1
(Germany) **M-K Goellner**	**6**	3	**6**
(Germany) H Dreekmann	3	**6**	0
(Japan) **S Matsuoka**	**6**	**7**
(Australia) S Draper	2	5
Q	(United States) B Behrens	4	4
8	(Italy) **A Gaudenzi**	**6**	**6**
4	(Austria) G Schaller	5	3
(United Kingdom) **G Rusedski**	**7**	**6**
(Spain) **F Mantilla**	4	**6**	**6**
(Czech Republic) D Rikl	**6**	4	1
Q	(Canada) D Nestor	4	3
(Denmark) **K Carlsen**	**6**	**6**
(Morocco) **Y El Aynaoui**	**7^{7}**	**6**
5	(Spain) A Berasategui	6^{5}	3
6	(Czech Republic) **C Doseděl**	**6**	**6**
(Argentina) G Pérez Roldán	4	2
(Italy) **S Pescosolido**	**6**	1	**6**
WC	(Austria) C Trimmel	4	**6**	1
(Sweden) **S Edberg**	**6**	**6**
(Slovakia) K Kučera	3	4
Q	(Austria) W Schranz	6^{2}	1
3	(Zimbabwe) **B Black**	**7^{7}**	**6**
7	(Spain) **F Clavet**	3	**6**	**6**
Q	(Argentina) M Charpentier	**6**	3	1
(United States) D Wheaton	4	5
(Spain) **J Sánchez**	**6**	**7**
(Uruguay) **M Filippini**	**6**	**7**
(Denmark) F Fetterlein	2	5
(Sweden) T Johansson	4	6^{4}
WC/2	(Chile) **M Ríos**	**6**	**7^{7}**

Second round
1	(Austria) **T Muster**	6^{4}	**6**	**7^{9}**
(Germany) M-K Goellner	**7^{7}**	4	6^{7}
(Japan) S Matsuoka	0	1
8	(Italy) **A Gaudenzi**	**6**	**6**
(United Kingdom) G Rusedski	2	**7^{7}**	3
(Spain) **F Mantilla**	**6**	6^{3}	**6**
(Denmark) **K Carlsen**	**6**	**6**
(Morocco) Y El Aynaoui	1	4
6	(Czech Republic) **C Doseděl**	**6**	**6**
(Italy) S Pescosolido	3	0
(Sweden) **S Edberg**	**6**	**7**
3	(Zimbabwe) B Black	4	5
7	(Spain) **F Clavet**	5	**6**	**6**
(Spain) J Sánchez	**7**	0	2
(Uruguay) M Filippini	2	2
WC/2	(Chile) **M Ríos**	**6**	**6**

Quarterfinals
1	(Austria) T Muster
8	(Italy) **A Gaudenzi**	**w/o**
(Spain) **F Mantilla**	**6**	**6**
(Denmark) K Carlsen	4	0
6	(Czech Republic) **C Doseděl**	**6**	**6**
(Sweden) S Edberg	3	3
7	(Spain) F Clavet	2	**6**	3
WC/2	(Chile) **M Ríos**	**6**	1	**6**

Semifinals
8	(Italy) A Gaudenzi	3	**7**	2
(Spain) **F Mantilla**	**6**	5	**6**
6	(Czech Republic) C Doseděl	6^{4}	3
WC/2	(Chile) **M Ríos**	**7^{7}**	**6**

Final
(Spain) Félix Mantilla	2	4
WC/2	(Chile) **Marcelo Ríos**	**6**	**6**
