= 1995 ATP St. Pölten – Doubles =

Doubles
- 1995 ATP St. Pölten

Final
- Champions: (United States) Bill Behrens (United States) Matt Lucena
- Runners-up: (Belgium) Libor Pimek (South Africa) Byron Talbot
- Score: 7–5, 6–4

Details
- Draw: 16 (3WC/1Q)
- Seeds: 4

Events
Singles	Doubles
← 1994 ·	Hypo Group Tennis International	· 1996 →

Vojtěch Flégl and Andrew Florent were the defending champions, but Florent chose to compete at Halle during the same week. Flégl teamed up with Andrew Kratzmann and lost in the first round to Rikard Bergh and Jack Waite.

Bill Behrens and Matt Lucena won the title by defeating Libor Pimek and Byron Talbot 7–5, 6–4 in the final.

== Seeds ==
1. (South Africa) Piet Norval / (Netherlands) Menno Oosting (semifinals)
2. (Italy) Andrea Gaudenzi / (Spain) Javier Sánchez (quarterfinals)
3. (Spain) Jordi Arrese / (South Africa) Christo van Rensburg (quarterfinals)
4. (Czechoslovakia) Vojtěch Flégl / (Australia) Andrew Kratzmann (first round)

== Draw ==
=== Key ===
- Q = Qualifier
- WC = Wild card
- LL = Lucky loser
- Alt = Alternate
- SE = Special exempt
- PR = Protected ranking
- ITF = ITF entry
- JE = Junior exempt
- w/o = Walkover
- r = Retired
- d = Defaulted
- SR = Special ranking

=== Draw ===
First round
1	(South Africa) P Norval (Netherlands) M Oosting	5	7	6
(United States) S Cannon (South Africa) S Kruger	7	5	4
Q	(Argentina) F Davín (Italy) S Pescosolido	6	6
WC	(Austria) G Schaller (Czech Republic) B Ulihrach	3	3
3	(Spain) J Arrese (South Africa) C van Rensburg	7	7
(United States) M Bauer (Australia) J Ireland	6	6
(Belgium) L Pimek (South Africa) B Talbot	6	6
WC	(Austria) J Knowle (Austria) H Wiltschnig	2	3
(France) R Gilbert (France) F Santoro	6	6
(Spain) JA Conde (Spain) A López Morón	3	1
(Sweden) R Bergh (United States) J Waite	6	6
4	(Czech Republic) V Flégl (Australia) A Kratzmann	4	4
WC	(Spain) J Burillo (Norway) C Ruud	3	6	3
(United States) B Behrens (United States) M Lucena	6	1	6
(Argentina) P Arnold (Hungary) G Köves	1	4
2	(Italy) A Gaudenzi (Spain) J Sánchez	6	6

Quarterfinals
1	(South Africa) P Norval (Netherlands) M Oosting	4	6	6
Q	(Argentina) F Davín (Italy) S Pescosolido	6	3	2
3	(Spain) J Arrese (South Africa) C van Rensburg	3	7	5
(Belgium) L Pimek (South Africa) B Talbot	6	5	7
(France) R Gilbert (France) F Santoro	7	3	4
(Sweden) R Bergh (United States) J Waite	6	6	6
(United States) B Behrens (United States) M Lucena	6	4	6
2	(Italy) A Gaudenzi (Spain) J Sánchez	3	6	2

Semifinals
1	(South Africa) P Norval (Netherlands) M Oosting	4	3
(Belgium) L Pimek (South Africa) B Talbot	6	6
(Sweden) R Bergh (United States) J Waite	6	5
(United States) B Behrens (United States) M Lucena	7	7

Final
(Belgium) L Pimek (South Africa) B Talbot	5	4
(United States) B Behrens (United States) M Lucena	7	6
