= 1995 ATP St. Pölten – Singles =

Singles
- 1995 ATP St. Pölten

Final
- Champion: (Austria) Thomas Muster
- Runner-up: (Czech Republic) Bohdan Ulihrach
- Score: 6–3, 3–6, 6–1

Details
- Draw: 32 (3WC/4Q/1LL)
- Seeds: 8

Events
Singles	Doubles
← 1994 ·	Hypo Group Tennis International	· 1996 →

Thomas Muster won his third consecutive title at St. Pölten by defeating Bohdan Ulihrach 6–3, 3–6, 6–1 in the final.

== Seeds ==
1. (Austria) Thomas Muster (champion)
2. (Italy) Andrea Gaudenzi (first round)
3. (Austria) Gilbert Schaller (quarterfinals)
4. (Spain) Francisco Clavet (second round)
5. (France) Fabrice Santoro (second round)
6. (Spain) Javier Sánchez (second round)
7. (Norway) Christian Ruud (first round)
8. (Czech Republic) Sláva Doseděl (semifinals)

== Draw ==
=== Key ===
- Q = Qualifier
- WC = Wild card
- LL = Lucky loser
- Alt = Alternate
- SE = Special exempt
- PR = Protected ranking
- ITF = ITF entry
- JE = Junior exempt
- w/o = Walkover
- r = Retired
- d = Defaulted
- SR = Special ranking

=== Finals ===
Semifinals
1	(Austria) Thomas Muster	6	3	6
(Italy) Stefano Pescosolido	0	6	4
(Czech Republic) Bohdan Ulihrach	7	6
8	(Czech Republic) Sláva Doseděl	5	0

Final
1	(Austria) Thomas Muster	6	3	6
(Czech Republic) Bohdan Ulihrach	3	6	1

=== Top half ===
First round
1	(Austria) T Muster	4	7^{9}	6
(Belgium) F Dewulf	6	6^{7}	3
(Spain) Á López Morón	6	6
Q	(Spain) G Blanco	3	4
WC	(Italy) D Bracciali	3	4
(France) R Gilbert	6	6
(Hungary) S Noszály	6	6
7	(Norway) C Ruud	2	4
3	(Austria) G Schaller	4	6	6
Q	(Slovenia) I Božič	6	3	1
(Slovakia) J Krošlák	1	4
(Spain) A Mancisidor	6	6
Q	(Croatia) S Hiršzon	2	7^{10}	6^{5}
(Italy) S Pescosolido	6	6^{8}	7^{7}
(Spain) C Costa	3	3
5/WC	(France) F Santoro	6	6

Second round
1	(Austria) T Muster	6	6
(Spain) Á López Morón	2	2
(France) R Gilbert	6	7
(Hungary) S Noszály	4	5
3	(Austria) G Schaller	6	7
(Spain) A Mancisidor	4	5
(Italy) S Pescosolido	6	6
5/WC	(France) F Santoro	3	3

Quarterfinals
1	(Austria) T Muster	6	6
(France) R Gilbert	2	2
3	(Austria) G Schaller	1	6^{6}
(Italy) S Pescosolido	6	7^{8}

Semifinals
1	(Austria) T Muster	6	3	6
(Italy) S Pescosolido	0	6	4

=== Bottom half ===
First round
6	(Spain) J Sánchez	6	4	6
(Germany) C Arriens	0	6	3
(Czech Republic) B Ulihrach	2	6	6
WC	(Austria) H Wiltschnig	6	4	1
LL	(Australia) A Ilie	4	6	6^{0}
Q	(Spain) C Moyá	6	1	7^{7}
(Portugal) N Marques	6^{10}	6	4
4	(Spain) F Clavet	7^{12}	3	6
8	(Czech Republic) S Doseděl	5	6	7
(Argentina) F Davín	7	2	5
(Argentina) H Gumy	3	6	1
(Spain) Ó Martínez	6	1	6
(Spain) E Sánchez	6^{3}	1
(Spain) J Burillo	7^{7}	6
(Spain) J Arrese	6	6^{4}	6
2	(Italy) A Gaudenzi	3	7^{7}	4

Second round
6	(Spain) J Sánchez	6	3	3
(Czech Republic) B Ulihrach	3	6	6
Q	(Spain) C Moyá	7	7
4	(Spain) F Clavet	5	5
8	(Czech Republic) S Doseděl	6	6
(Spain) Ó Martínez	1	1
(Spain) J Burillo	6	6
(Spain) J Arrese	3	2

Quarterfinals
(Czech Republic) B Ulihrach	6	6
Q	(Spain) C Moyá	3	1
8	(Czech Republic) S Doseděl	6	6^{7}	6
(Spain) J Burillo	3	7^{9}	4

Semifinals
(Czech Republic) B Ulihrach	7	6
8	(Czech Republic) S Doseděl	5	0
