= 1995 ATP St. Pölten =

- Date: 19–25 June
- Edition: 15th
- Category: ATP World Series
- Draw: 32S / 16D
- Prize money: $350,000
- Surface: Clay / outdoor
- Location: Sankt Pölten, Austria

Champions

Singles
- (Austria) Thomas Muster

Doubles
- (United States) Bill Behrens / (United States) Matt Lucena
← 1994 ·	ATP St. Pölten	· 1996 →

The 1995 ATP St. Pölten, also known as OTV Raiffeisen Grand Prix for sponsorship reasons, is a men's tennis tournament played in St. Poelten, Austria on outdoor clay courts. The tournament was held from 19 June until 26 June 1995 and was part of the ATP World Series of the 1995 ATP Tour.

First-seeded Thomas Muster won the singles title, his 4th win at the event after 1994, 1993, and 1988.

== Finals ==
=== Singles ===
(Austria) Thomas Muster defeated (Czech Republic) Bohdan Ulihrach 6–3, 3–6, 6–1

- It was Muster's 7th singles title of the year and the 30th of his career.

=== Doubles ===
(United States) Bill Behrens / (United States) Matt Lucena defeated (Belgium) Libor Pimek / (South Africa) Byron Talbot 7–5, 6–4
