= Kirk Haygarth =

South African tennis player

- Full name: Kirk Haygarth
- Country (sports): South Africa
- Born: 20 January 1971 (age 54)
- Prize money: $30,535

Singles
- Career record: 0–0
- Highest ranking: No. 944 (30 November 1992)

Doubles
- Career record: 4–8
- Career titles: 0
- Highest ranking: No. 131 (25 July 1994)

Kirk Haygarth (born 20 January 1971) is a former professional tennis player from South Africa.

== Biography ==
=== Personal life ===
Haygarth was born in 1971, the son of Peter and Renée from Durban. His mother, known during her career as Renée Schuurman, was a tennis player who won six grand slam doubles titles. He has an older brother Brent, who also became a tennis player.

=== Tennis career ===
Following two years at Texas A&M University, Haygarth played on the professional circuit as a doubles specialist. He never featured in the main draw of any of the grand slams but took part in the qualifying draw for the men's doubles at the 1993 Wimbledon Championships. At the 1994 ATP St. Pölten tournament, his first ATP Tour main draw appearance, Haygarth partnered with Jon Ireland to make the semi-finals, which they lost narrowly in a third set tiebreak. His best career ranking in doubles was 131 in the world, reached in mid 1994 after winning the Oberstaufen Challenger, one of three Challenger titles he won. He made two further ATP Tour quarter-finals, with Marcos Ondruska at Tel Aviv in 1994 and Johannesburg in 1995 partnering Grant Stafford.

== Challenger titles ==
=== Doubles: (3) ===
| No. | Year | Tournament | Surface | Partner | Opponents | Score |
|---|---|---|---|---|---|---|
| 1. | 1993 | Liège, Belgium | Clay | (South Africa) Brendan Curry | (Sweden) Jan Apell (Australia) Paul Kilderry | 6–3, 4–6, 6–4 |
| 2. | 1994 | Celle, Germany | Carpet | (United States) Bill Behrens | (Germany) Alexander Mronz (Germany) Arne Thoms | 6–4, 4–6, 6–3 |
| 3. | 1994 | Oberstaufen, Germany | Clay | (Australia) Joshua Eagle | (Spain) Álex López Morón (Italy) Massimo Valeri | 6–3, 6–2 |
