= 1996 Australian Open – Men's doubles =

Tennis tournament

Men's doubles
- 1996 Australian Open

Final
- Champion: (Sweden) Stefan Edberg (Czech Republic) Petr Korda
- Runner-up: (Canada) Sébastien Lareau (United States) Alex O'Brien
- Score: 7–5, 7–5, 4–6, 6–1

Details
- Draw: 64
- Seeds: 16

Events
Singles	men	women		boys	girls
Doubles	men	women	mixed	boys	girls
WC Singles	men	women	quad
WC Doubles	men	women	quad
Legends	men	women	mixed
- Australian Open

The 1996 Australian Open was a tennis tournament played on outdoor hard courts at Melbourne Park in Melbourne in Victoria in Australia. It was the 84th edition of the Australian Open and was held from 15 through 28 January 1996.

== Seeds ==
Champion seeds are indicated in bold text while text in italics indicates the round in which those seeds were eliminated.

1. (Australia) Todd Woodbridge / (Australia) Mark Woodforde (first round)
2. (Netherlands) Jacco Eltingh / (Netherlands) Paul Haarhuis (third round)
3. (The Bahamas) Mark Knowles / (Canada) Daniel Nestor (quarterfinals)
4. (United States) Patrick Galbraith / (Russia) Andrei Olhovskiy (semifinals)
5. (Czech Republic) Cyril Suk / (Czech Republic) Daniel Vacek (third round)
6. (Zimbabwe) Byron Black / (Canada) Grant Connell (second round)
7. (United States) Tommy Ho / (New Zealand) Brett Steven (third round)
8. (United States) Patrick McEnroe / (Australia) Sandon Stolle (second round)
9. (United States) Rick Leach / (United States) Scott Melville (quarterfinals)
10. (Argentina) Luis Lobo / (Spain) Javier Sánchez (second round)
11. Unknown (withdrew)
12. (France) Guy Forget / (Switzerland) Jakob Hlasek (semifinals)
13. (South Africa) Wayne Ferreira / (Russia) Yevgeny Kafelnikov (third round)
14. (Sweden) Jan Apell / (Sweden) Jonas Björkman (third round)
15. (United States) Mark Keil / (United States) Jeff Tarango (third round)
16. (Australia) Mark Philippoussis / (Australia) Patrick Rafter (second round)

== Draw ==
Key

- Q = Qualifier
- WC = Wild card
- LL = Lucky loser
- Alt = Alternate
- ITF = ITF entry
- PR = Protected ranking
- SR = Special ranking
- SE = Special exempt
- JE = Junior exempt
- JR = Junior Accelerator Programme entrant
- CO = College Accelerator Programme entrant
- NG = Next Gen Accelerator Program entrant
- w/o = Walkover
- r = Retired
- d = Defaulted

=== Finals ===
Quarterfinals
(Sweden) **Stefan Edberg** **(Czech Republic) Petr Korda**	**6**	**6**	**7**
9	(United States) Rick Leach (United States) Scott Melville	4	4	5
4	(United States) **Patrick Galbraith** **(Russia) Andrei Olhovskiy**	**7**	**6**	**6**
(Australia) Scott Draper (Australia) Jason Stoltenberg	5	2	4
12	(France) **Guy Forget** **(Switzerland) Jakob Hlasek**	**6**	1	**6**	**6**
3	(The Bahamas) Mark Knowles (Canada) Daniel Nestor	4	**6**	3	3
(Canada) **Sébastien Lareau** **(United States) Alex O'Brien**	**7**	**6**	**6**
(Czech Republic) Martin Damm (United States) Jim Grabb	5	2	4

Semifinals
(Sweden) **Stefan Edberg** **(Czech Republic) Petr Korda**	**6**	**7**	**6**
4	(United States) Patrick Galbraith (Russia) Andrei Olhovskiy	2	6^{2}	3
12	(France) Guy Forget (Switzerland) Jakob Hlasek	3	**7**	**6**	2	4
(Canada) **Sébastien Lareau** **(United States) Alex O'Brien**	**6**	5	3	**6**	**6**

Final
(Sweden) **Stefan Edberg** **(Czech Republic) Petr Korda**	**7**	**7**	4	**6**
(Canada) Sébastien Lareau (United States) Alex O'Brien	5	5	**6**	1

=== Top half ===
==== Section 1 ====
First round
1	(Australia) T Woodbridge (Australia) M Woodforde	2	**7**	8
(Australia) **J Eagle** **(Australia) A Florent**	**6**	5	**10**
(Sweden) **S Edberg** **(Czech Republic) P Korda**	**6**	**6**
(Czech Republic) V Flégl (Belgium) D Norman	2	2
(Italy) **C Brandi** **(South Africa) M Ondruska**	**6**	4	**9**
(United States) D Johnson (United States) K Thorne	3	**6**	7
15	(United States) **M Keil** **(United States) J Tarango**	**6**	**6**
(South Africa) L Bale (South Africa) B Haygarth	3	4
9	(United States) **R Leach** **(United States) S Melville**	**6**	**6**
(Australia) R Fromberg (Australia) J Ireland	4	3
(Argentina) **J Frana** **(Venezuela) N Pereira**	**6**	**6**
(United States) M Lucena (United States) B MacPhie	1	3
(Australia) **M Tebbutt** **(Australia) P Tramacchi**	**6**	**7**
(Netherlands) T Nijssen (United States) G Van Emburgh	4	6^{5}
8	(United States) **P McEnroe** **(Australia) S Stolle**	**6**	**7**
(Australia) N Borwick (Australia) A Painter	1	6^{4}

Second round
(Australia) J Eagle (Australia) A Florent	**6**	3	2
(Sweden) **S Edberg** **(Czech Republic) P Korda**	4	**6**	**6**
(Italy) C Brandi (South Africa) Marcos Ondruska	**6**	6^{6}	2
15	(United States) **M Keil** **(United States) J Tarango**	4	**7**	**6**
9	(United States) **R Leach** **(United States) S Melville**	**6**	**6**
(Argentina) J Frana (Venezuela) N Pereira	3	3
(Australia) **M Tebbutt** **(Australia) P Tramacchi**	**6**	**6**
8	(United States) P McEnroe (Australia) S Stolle	4	4

Third round
(Sweden) **S Edberg** **(Czech Republic) P Korda**	**6**	**6**
15	(United States) M Keil (United States) J Tarango	1	4
9	(United States) **R Leach** **(United States) S Melville**	**6**	**6**
(Australia) M Tebbutt (Australia) P Tramacchi	3	4

Quarterfinals
(Sweden) **S Edberg** **(Czech Republic) P Korda**	**6**	**6**	**7**
9	(United States) R Leach (United States) S Melville	4	4	5

==== Section 2 ====
First round
4	(United States) **P Galbraith** **(Russia) A Olhovskiy**	**7**	4	**8**
(Sweden) L-A Wahlgren (Netherlands) F Wibier	5	**6**	6
(France) **R Gilbert** **(France) G Raoux**	**6**	**7**
(United States) L Jensen (United States) M Jensen	4	6^{1}
(South Africa) **J-L de Jager** **(South Africa) G Muller**	**6**	**6**
(Australia) P Kilderry (Portugal) N Marques	2	2
14	(Sweden) **J Apell** **(Sweden) J Björkman**	6^{3}	**6**	**11**
(Sweden) P Nyborg (Sweden) M Tillström	**7**	3	9
(Australia) **S Draper** **(Australia) J Stoltenberg**	**6**	**6**
(South Africa) C Ferreira (North Macedonia) A Kitinov	4	4
(France) **O Delaître** **(France) F Santoro**	**7**	**6**
(United States) B Behrens (United States) J Waite	6^{3}	1
(Australia) **J Holmes** **(Australia) T Larkham**	**6**	**7**
(United Kingdom) T Henman (United Kingdom) A Richardson	3	5
5	(Czech Republic) **C Suk** **(Czech Republic) D Vacek**	**6**	**6**
(Zimbabwe) W Black (United States) D Wheaton	2	1

Second round
4	(United States) **P Galbraith** **(Russia) A Olhovskiy**	**6**	**6**
(France) R Gilbert (France) G Raoux	4	4
(South Africa) J-L de Jager (South Africa) G Muller	4	2
14	(Sweden) **J Apell** **(Sweden) J Björkman**	**6**	**6**
(Australia) **S Draper** **(Australia) J Stoltenberg**	**7**	**6**
(France) O Delaître (France) F Santoro	5	3
(Australia) J Holmes (Australia) T Larkham	4	6^{6}
5	(Czech Republic) **C Suk** **(Czech Republic) D Vacek**	**6**	**7**

Third round
4	(United States) **P Galbraith** **(Russia) A Olhovskiy**	6^{3}	**6**	**6**
14	(Sweden) J Apell (Sweden) J Björkman	**7**	3	3
(Australia) **S Draper** **(Australia) J Stoltenberg**	**6**	4	**7**
5	(Czech Republic) C Suk (Czech Republic) D Vacek	4	**6**	5

Quarterfinals
4	(United States) **P Galbraith** **(Russia) A Olhovskiy**	**7**	**6**	**6**
(Australia) S Draper (Australia) J Stoltenberg	5	2	4

=== Bottom half ===
==== Section 3 ====
First round
6	(Zimbabwe) **B Black** **(Canada) G Connell**	5	**6**	**6**
(United States) K Kinnear (United States) D Randall	**7**	1	2
(Germany) **M-K Goellner** **(Germany) D Prinosil**	**6**	**6**
(Australia) A Kratzmann (Australia) J Morgan	4	4
(Sweden) **R Bergh** **(Sweden) D Ekerot**	**6**	**6**
(Australia) H Denman (Australia) M Draper	4	2
12	(France) **G Forget** **(Switzerland) J Hlasek**	6^{5}	**6**	**6**
(United States) S Davis (United States) D Pate	**7**	4	4
13	(South Africa) **W Ferreira** **(Russia) Y Kafelnikov**	4	**6**	**6**
(South Africa) D Adams (Germany) P Kühnen	**6**	4	4
(United States) **T Kronemann** **(Australia) D Macpherson**	**6**	**6**
(United States) S Cannon (United States) F Montana	3	1
(Mexico) **L Lavalle** **(Spain) E Sánchez**	**6**	**7**
(Spain) J-A Conde (Spain) À Corretja	3	5
3	(The Bahamas) **M Knowles** **(Canada) D Nestor**	**6**	3	**6**
(Australia) G Doyle (Australia) B Ellwood	4	**6**	3

Second round
6	(Zimbabwe) B Black (Canada) G Connell	**6**	6^{5}	6
6	(Germany) **M-K Goellner** **(Germany) D Prinosil**	3	**7**	**8**
(Sweden) R Bergh (Sweden) D Ekerot	4	2
12	(France) **G Forget** **(Switzerland) J Hlasek**	**6**	**6**
13	(South Africa) **W Ferreira** **(Russia) Y Kafelnikov**	**6**	**6**
(United States) T Kronemann (Australia) D Macpherson	4	3
(Mexico) L Lavalle (Spain) E Sánchez	2	4
3	(The Bahamas) **M Knowles** **(Canada) D Nestor**	**6**	**6**

Third round
(Germany) M-K Goellner (Germany) D Prinosil	3	**7**	2
12	(France) **G Forget** **(Switzerland) J Hlasek**	**6**	6^{5}	**6**
13	(South Africa) W Ferreira (Russia) Y Kafelnikov	6^{2}	3
3	(The Bahamas) **M Knowles** **(Canada) D Nestor**	**7**	**6**

Quarterfinals
12	(France) **G Forget** **(Switzerland) J Hlasek**	**6**	1	**6**	**6**
3	(The Bahamas) M Knowles (Canada) D Nestor	4	**6**	3	3

==== Section 4 ====
First round
7	(United States) **T Ho** **(New Zealand) B Steven**	**6**	**6**
(Italy) A Gaudenzi (Italy) D Nargiso	4	1
(United Kingdom) **N Broad** **(South Africa) P Norval**	**6**	**6**
(Belgium) L Pimek (South Africa) B Talbot	3	2
(Canada) **S Lareau** **(United States) A O'Brien**	**6**	**6**
(United States) K Flach (United States) K Jones	4	3
10	(Argentina) **L Lobo** **(Spain) J Sánchez**	**6**	**6**
(Australia) W Arthurs (Australia) B Larkham	4	4
16	(Australia) **M Philippoussis** **(Australia) P Rafter**	**7**	6^{5}	**6**
(South Africa) E Ferreira (Netherlands) J Siemerink	6^{5}	**7**	3
(Czech Republic) **M Damm** **(United States) J Grabb**	**7**	6^{4}	**6**
(United States) V Spadea (South Africa) C van Rensburg	6^{4}	**7**	3
(Germany) **M Sinner** **(Netherlands) J Winnink**	**6**	6^{1}	**11**
(Netherlands) T Kempers (Netherlands) S Noteboom	1	**7**	9
2	(Netherlands) **J Eltingh** **(Netherlands) P Haarhuis**	**6**	**7**
(Sweden) N Kulti (Sweden) M Larsson	3	5

Second round
7	(United States) **T Ho** **(New Zealand) B Steven**	**6**	**6**
(United Kingdom) N Broad (South Africa) P Norval	2	2
(Canada) **S Lareau** **(United States) A O'Brien**	**7**	**6**
10	(Argentina) L Lobo (Spain) J Sánchez	5	2
16	(Australia) M Philippoussis (Australia) P Rafter
(Czech Republic) **M Damm** **(United States) J Grabb**	w/o
(Germany) M Sinner (Netherlands) J Winnink	3	3
2	(Netherlands) **J Eltingh** **(Netherlands) P Haarhuis**	**6**	**6**

Third round
7	(United States) T Ho (New Zealand) B Steven	3	3
(Canada) **S Lareau** **(United States) A O'Brien**	**6**	**6**
(Czech Republic) **M Damm** **(United States) J Grabb**	**7**	**6**
2	(Netherlands) J Eltingh (Netherlands) P Haarhuis	6^{5}	2

Quarterfinals
(Canada) **S Lareau** **(United States) A O'Brien**	**7**	**6**	**6**
(Czech Republic) M Damm (United States) J Grabb	5	2	4
