= 1996 Australian Open =

- Date: 15–28 January 1996
- Edition: 84th
- Category: Grand Slam (ITF)
- Surface: Hardcourt (Rebound Ace)
- Location: Melbourne, Australia
- Venue: Melbourne Park

Champions

Men's singles
- (Germany) Boris Becker

Women's singles
- (United States) Monica Seles

Men's doubles
- (Sweden) Stefan Edberg / (Czech Republic) Petr Korda

Women's doubles
- (United States) Chanda Rubin / (Spain) Arantxa Sánchez Vicario

Mixed doubles
- (Latvia) Larisa Neiland / (Australia) Mark Woodforde

Boys' singles
- (Sweden) Björn Rehnquist

Girls' singles
- (Poland) Magdalena Grzybowska

Boys' doubles
- (Italy) Daniele Bracciali / (Canada) Jocelyn Robichaud

Girls' doubles
- (Czech Republic) Michaela Pastiková / (Czech Republic) Jitka Schönfeldová
- Australian Open

The 1996 Australian Open was a tennis tournament played on outdoor hard courts at Melbourne Park in Melbourne in Victoria in Australia. It was the 84th edition of the Australian Open and was held from 15 through 28 January 1996.

== Seniors ==
=== Men's singles ===
(Germany) Boris Becker defeated (United States) Michael Chang 6–2, 6–4, 2–6, 6–2

- It was Becker's 6th and last career Grand Slam title and his 2nd Australian Open title.

=== Women's singles ===
(United States) Monica Seles defeated (Germany) Anke Huber 6–4, 6–1

- It was Seles' 9th and last career Grand Slam title and her 4th Australian Open title.

=== Men's doubles ===
(Sweden) Stefan Edberg / (Czech Republic) Petr Korda defeated (Canada) Sébastien Lareau / (United States) Alex O'Brien 7–5, 7–5, 4–6, 6–1

- It was Edberg's 9th and last career Grand Slam title and his 4th Australian Open title. It was Korda's 1st career Grand Slam title and his 1st Australian Open title.

=== Women's doubles ===
(United States) Chanda Rubin / (Spain) Arantxa Sánchez Vicario defeated (United States) Lindsay Davenport / (United States) Mary Joe Fernández 7–5, 2–6, 6–4

- It was Rubin's only career Grand Slam title. It was Sánchez Vicario's 12th career Grand Slam title and her 4th and last Australian Open title.

=== Mixed doubles ===
(Latvia) Larisa Neiland / (Australia) Mark Woodforde defeated (United States) Nicole Arendt / (United States) Luke Jensen 4–6, 7–5, 6–0

- It was Neiland's 6th and last career Grand Slam title and her 2nd Australian Open title. It was Woodforde's 11th career Grand Slam title and his 3rd Australian Open title.

== Juniors ==
=== Boys' singles ===
(Sweden) Björn Rehnquist defeated (Sweden) Mathias Hellstrom 2–6, 6–2, 7–5

=== Girls' singles ===
(Poland) Magdalena Grzybowska defeated (France) Nathalie Dechy 6–1, 4–6, 6–1

=== Boys' doubles ===
(Italy) Daniele Bracciali / (Canada) Jocelyn Robichaud defeated (United States) Bob Bryan / (United States) Mike Bryan 3–6, 6–3, 6–3

=== Girls' doubles ===
(Czech Republic) Michaela Paštiková / (Czech Republic) Jitka Schönfeldová defeated (Belarus) Olga Barabanschikova / (Croatia) Mirjana Lučić 6–1, 6–3

Preceded by 1995 US Open	Grand Slams	Succeeded by 1996 French Open
