= 1996 Australian Open – Women's doubles =

Women's doubles
- 1996 Australian Open

Final
- Champions: (United States) Chanda Rubin (Spain) Arantxa Sánchez Vicario
- Runners-up: (United States) Lindsay Davenport (United States) Mary Joe Fernández
- Score: 7–5, 2–6, 6–4

Details
- Draw: 64
- Seeds: 16

Events
Singles	men	women		boys	girls
Doubles	men	women	mixed	boys	girls
WC Singles	men	women	quad
WC Doubles	men	women	quad
Legends	men	women	mixed
- Australian Open

The 1996 Australian Open was a tennis tournament played on outdoor hard courts at Melbourne Park in Melbourne in Victoria in Australia. It was the 84th edition of the Australian Open and was held from 15 through 28 January 1996.

Chanda Rubin partnered with Arantxa Sánchez Vicario and together they successfully defended Sánchez Vicario’s title, defeating Lindsay Davenport and Mary Joe Fernández 7–5, 2–6, 6–4 in the final. It was the first and only Grand Slam doubles title for Rubin, and the sixth and final Grand Slam doubles title (third and final Australian Open doubles title) for Sánchez Vicario, in their respective careers.

Sánchez Vicario and Jana Novotná were the defending champions, but Novotná did not compete this year.

After making the semifinals or better in the last 19 consecutive grand slam tournaments, №1 seeds Gigi Fernández and Natasha Zvereva were ousted in the quarterfinals by Rubin and Sánchez Vicario.

== Seeds ==
1. (United States) Gigi Fernández / (Belarus) Natasha Zvereva (quarterfinals)
2. (United States) Meredith McGrath / (Latvia) Larisa Neiland (semifinals)
3. (United States) Lindsay Davenport / (United States) Mary Joe Fernández (final)
4. (United States) Nicole Arendt / (Netherlands) Manon Bollegraf (semifinals)
5. (United States) Lori McNeil / (Czech Republic) Helena Suková (first round)
6. (Netherlands) Brenda Schultz-McCarthy / (Australia) Rennae Stubbs (second round)
7. (United States) Lisa Raymond / (Argentina) Gabriela Sabatini (quarterfinals)
8. (United States) Chanda Rubin / (Spain) Arantxa Sánchez Vicario (champions)
9. (Spain) Conchita Martínez / (Argentina) Patricia Tarabini (third round)
10. (Canada) Jill Hetherington / (Australia) Kristine Radford (first round)
11. (Belgium) Els Callens / (France) Julie Halard-Decugis (third round)
12. (Switzerland) Martina Hingis / (Croatia) Iva Majoli (first round)
13. (South Africa) Amanda Coetzer / (South Africa) Mariaan de Swardt (third round)
14. (Netherlands) Kristie Boogert / (Australia) Nicole Bradtke (third round)
15. (Romania) Irina Spîrlea / (United States) Linda Wild (third round)
16. (Italy) Silvia Farina / (Italy) Laura Golarsa (first round)

== Draw ==
Key

- Q = Qualifier
- WC = Wild card
- LL = Lucky loser
- Alt = Alternate
- ITF = ITF entry
- PR = Protected ranking
- SR = Special ranking
- SE = Special exempt
- JE = Junior exempt
- JR = Junior Accelerator Programme entrant
- CO = College Accelerator Programme entrant
- NG = Next Gen Accelerator Program entrant
- w/o = Walkover
- r = Retired
- d = Defaulted

=== Finals ===
Quarterfinals
1	(United States) Gigi Fernández (Belarus) Natasha Zvereva	1	7^{7}	4
8	(United States) Chanda Rubin (Spain) Arantxa Sánchez Vicario	6	6^{3}	6
4	(United States) Nicole Arendt (Netherlands) Manon Bollegraf	6	2	7
(Indonesia) Yayuk Basuki (Netherlands) Caroline Vis	1	6	5
7	(United States) Lisa Raymond (Argentina) Gabriela Sabatini	3	6	2
3	(United States) Lindsay Davenport (United States) Mary Joe Fernández	6	4	6
(Russia) Elena Makarova (Russia) Eugenia Maniokova	0	6	3
2	(United States) Meredith McGrath (Latvia) Larisa Neiland	6	3	6

Semifinals
8	(United States) Chanda Rubin (Spain) Arantxa Sánchez Vicario	6	2	6
4	(United States) Nicole Arendt (Netherlands) Manon Bollegraf	4	6	2
3	(United States) Lindsay Davenport (United States) Mary Joe Fernández	6	6
2	(United States) Meredith McGrath (Latvia) Larisa Neiland	2	3

Final
8	(United States) Chanda Rubin (Spain) Arantxa Sánchez Vicario	7	2	6
3	(United States) Lindsay Davenport (United States) Mary Joe Fernández	5	6	4

=== Top half ===
==== Section 1 ====
First round
1	(United States) G Fernández (Belarus) N Zvereva	6	6
(Bulgaria) K Maleeva (United States) S Stafford	3	3
(France) L Ghirardi-Rubbi (France) S Pitkowski	6	4	6
WC	(Australia) A Ellwood (Australia) N Pratt	4	6	8
WC	(Australia) L McShea (Australia) T Musgrave	3	3
(France) A Dechaume-Balleret (France) S Testud	6	6
WC	(United States) P Shriver (Australia) E Smylie	3	6	1
13	(South Africa) A Coetzer (South Africa) M de Swardt	6	2	6
16	(Italy) S Farina (Italy) L Golarsa	3	6	3
(Germany) A Huber (Germany) K Kschwendt	6	4	6
(Czech Republic) L Němečková (Slovakia) D Szabová	2	7	6
(Poland) M Grzybowska (Poland) A Olsza	6	5	4
(Australia) K Godridge (Australia) K Sharpe	5	6^{4}
(United States) E deLone (United States) A Keller	7	7^{7}
WC	(Australia) S Drake-Brockman (Australia) J Taylor	4	4
8	(United States) C Rubin (Spain) A Sánchez Vicario	6	6

Second round
1	(United States) G Fernández (Belarus) N Zvereva	2	6	6
WC	(Australia) A Ellwood (Australia) N Pratt	6	1	1
(France) A Dechaume-Balleret (France) S Testud	1	2
13	(South Africa) A Coetzer (South Africa) M de Swardt	6	6
(Germany) A Huber (Germany) K Kschwendt	6	6
(Czech Republic) L Němečková (Slovakia) D Szabová	3	0
(United States) E deLone (United States) A Keller	2	3
8	(United States) C Rubin (Spain) A Sánchez Vicario	6	6

Third round
1	(United States) G Fernández (Belarus) N Zvereva	7	6
13	(South Africa) A Coetzer (South Africa) M de Swardt	5	2
(Germany) A Huber (Germany) K Kschwendt	0	5
8	(United States) C Rubin (Spain) A Sánchez Vicario	6	7

Quarterfinals
1	(United States) G Fernández (Belarus) N Zvereva	1	7^{7}	4
8	(United States) C Rubin (Spain) A Sánchez Vicario	6	6^{3}	6

==== Section 2 ====
First round
4	(United States) N Arendt (Netherlands) M Bollegraf	6	6
(Argentina) M Paz (Canada) R Simpson	2	3
(Sweden) Å Carlsson (Romania) C Cristea	6	2	1
(Japan) K Nagatsuka (Japan) A Sugiyama	0	6	6
(France) I Demongeot (Australia) L Pleming	2	1
(Australia) R McQuillan (Germany) C Porwik	6	6
(Belgium) L Courtois (Belgium) N Feber	6^{0}	4
9	(Spain) C Martínez (Argentina) P Tarabini	7^{7}	6
12	(Switzerland) M Hingis (Croatia) I Majoli	7	0	3
(Japan) M Saeki (Japan) Y Yoshida	5	6	6
(Indonesia) Y Basuki (Netherlands) C Vis	6	6
(Romania) R Dragomir (South Africa) J Kruger	2	3
(Italy) R Grande (Hungary) A Temesvári	4	2
(Finland) N Dahlman (United Kingdom) C Wood	6	6
(United States) E Hakami (United States) D Scott	6	0	1
6	(Netherlands) B Schultz-McCarthy (Australia) R Stubbs	3	6	6

Second round
4	(United States) N Arendt (Netherlands) M Bollegraf	w/o
(Japan) K Nagatsuka (Japan) A Sugiyama
(Australia) R McQuillan (Germany) C Porwik	3	6^{3}
9	(Spain) C Martínez (Argentina) P Tarabini	6	7^{7}
(Japan) M Saeki (Japan) Y Yoshida	4	2
(Indonesia) Y Basuki (Netherlands) C Vis	6	6
(Finland) N Dahlman (United Kingdom) C Wood	7^{7}	6
6	(Netherlands) B Schultz-McCarthy (Australia) R Stubbs	6^{4}	3

Third round
4	(United States) N Arendt (Netherlands) M Bollegraf	6	2
9	(Spain) C Martínez (Argentina) P Tarabini	3	3^{r}
(Indonesia) Y Basuki (Netherlands) C Vis	6^{3}	6	6
(Finland) N Dahlman (United Kingdom) C Wood	7^{7}	4	2

Quarterfinals
4	(United States) N Arendt (Netherlands) M Bollegraf	6	2	7
(Indonesia) Y Basuki (Netherlands) C Vis	1	6	5

=== Bottom half ===
==== Section 3 ====
First round
7	(United States) L Raymond (Argentina) G Sabatini	6	6
(United States) A Grossman (United States) T Whitlinger-Jones	2	0
(United States) S Cacic (Greece) C Papadáki	2	6	1
(Belgium) S Appelmans (Netherlands) M Oremans	6	3	6
(Austria) P Schwarz (Slovakia) K Studeníková	6	6
(Russia) E Likhovtseva (Japan) H Nagano	3	2
(United Kingdom) V Lake (United States) L Poruri	6^{2}	5
14	(Netherlands) K Boogert (Australia) N Bradtke	7^{7}	7
15	(Romania) I Spîrlea (United States) L Wild	6	6
(Czech Republic) R Bobková (Czech Republic) P Langrová	3	1
(Australia) K-A Guse (Canada) P Hy-Boulais	6	6
(Germany) W Probst (Germany) C Singer	3	4
(Netherlands) K de Weille (Netherlands) S Noorlander	4	3
(Sweden) M Lindström (Sweden) M Strandlund	6	6
(Croatia) M Murić (Belgium) D van Roost	1	0
3	(United States) L Davenport (United States) MJ Fernández	6	6

Second round
7	(United States) L Raymond (Argentina) G Sabatini	6	6
(Belgium) S Appelmans (Netherlands) M Oremans	1	1
(Austria) P Schwarz (Slovakia) K Studeníková	0^{r}
14	(Netherlands) K Boogert (Australia) N Bradtke	4
15	(Romania) I Spîrlea (United States) L Wild	7	7^{7}
(Australia) K-A Guse (Canada) P Hy-Boulais	5	6^{5}
(Sweden) M Lindström (Sweden) M Strandlund	6^{5}	3
3	(United States) L Davenport (United States) MJ Fernández	7^{7}	6

Third round
7	(United States) L Raymond (Argentina) G Sabatini	6	7
14	(Netherlands) K Boogert (Australia) N Bradtke	0	5
15	(Romania) I Spîrlea (United States) L Wild	5	0
3	(United States) L Davenport (United States) MJ Fernández	7	6

Quarterfinals
7	(United States) L Raymond (Argentina) G Sabatini	3	6	2
3	(United States) L Davenport (United States) MJ Fernández	6	4	6

==== Section 4 ====
First round
5	(United States) L McNeil (Czech Republic) H Suková	6	6^{6}	3
(Japan) N Miyagi (United States) S Reece	2	7^{8}	6
(Slovenia) T Križan (Slovakia) R Zrubáková	1	6^{1}
(Australia) C Barclay (Australia) J Byrne	6	7^{7}
(Poland) M Mróz (United States) J Watanabe	3	2
(Czech Republic) E Melicharová (Czech Republic) H Vildová	6	6
(Russia) E Makarova (Russia) E Maniokova	6	6
10	(Canada) J Hetherington (Australia) K Radford	3	0
11	(Belgium) E Callens (France) J Halard-Decugis	6	6
(Japan) R Hiraki (South Korea) S-h Park	2	3
(Hungary) V Csurgó (Japan) N Kijimuta	6	6
(France) A Fusai (Slovakia) K Habšudová	4	4
(United States) A Frazier (United States) K Po	6	7^{8}
(Japan) Y Kamio (Argentina) F Labat	4	6^{6}
(Italy) S Cecchini (Italy) L Garrone	3	4
2	(United States) M McGrath (Latvia) L Neiland	6	6

Second round
(Japan) N Miyagi (United States) S Reece	1	0
(Australia) C Barclay (Australia) J Byrne	6	6
(Czech Republic) E Melicharová (Czech Republic) H Vildová	4	4
(Russia) E Makarova (Russia) E Maniokova	6	6
11	(Belgium) E Callens (France) J Halard-Decugis	7	6
(Hungary) V Csurgó (Japan) N Kijimuta	5	2
(United States) A Frazier (United States) K Po	4	3
2	(United States) M McGrath (Latvia) L Neiland	6	6

Third round
(Australia) C Barclay (Australia) J Byrne	4	2
(Russia) E Makarova (Russia) E Maniokova	6	6
11	(Belgium) E Callens (France) J Halard-Decugis	2	4
2	(United States) M McGrath (Latvia) L Neiland	6	6

Quarterfinals
(Russia) E Makarova (Russia) E Maniokova	0	6	3
2	(United States) M McGrath (Latvia) L Neiland	6	3	6
