= 1996 Australian Open – Men's singles =

Men's singles
- 1996 Australian Open

Final
- Champion: (Germany) Boris Becker
- Runner-up: (United States) Michael Chang
- Score: 6–2, 6–4, 2–6, 6–2

Details
- Draw: 128
- Seeds: 16

Events
Singles	men	women		boys	girls
Doubles	men	women	mixed	boys	girls
WC Singles	men	women	quad
WC Doubles	men	women	quad
Legends	men	women	mixed
- Australian Open

Boris Becker defeated Michael Chang in the final, 6–2, 6–4, 2–6, 6–2 to win the men's singles tennis title at the 1996 Australian Open. It was his second Australian Open title and sixth and last major title overall.

Andre Agassi was the defending champion, but lost in the semifinals to Chang.

This tournament marked the first major appearance of future world No. 1 and 1998 French Open champion Carlos Moyá; he lost to Andrei Medvedev in the first round. Moyá would reach the final at this major the following year.

== Seeds ==
The seeded players are listed below. Boris Becker is the champion; others show the round in which they were eliminated.

1. (United States) Pete Sampras (third round)
2. (United States) Andre Agassi (semifinals)
3. (Austria) Thomas Muster (fourth round)
4. (Germany) Boris Becker (champion)
5. (United States) Michael Chang (finalist)
6. (Russia) Yevgeny Kafelnikov (quarterfinals)
7. (Sweden) Thomas Enqvist (quarterfinals)
8. (United States) Jim Courier (quarterfinals)
9. (South Africa) Wayne Ferreira (second round)
10. (Croatia) Goran Ivanišević (third round)
11. (Netherlands) Richard Krajicek (third round)
12. (France) Arnaud Boetsch (second round)
13. (Switzerland) ~~Marc Rosset~~ (withdrew)
14. (Ukraine) Andriy Medvedev (second round)
15. (United States) Todd Martin (third round)
16. (Netherlands) Paul Haarhuis (first round)

== Draw ==
Key

- Q = Qualifier
- WC = Wild card
- LL = Lucky loser
- Alt = Alternate
- ITF = ITF entry
- PR = Protected ranking
- SR = Special ranking
- SE = Special exempt
- JE = Junior exempt
- JR = Junior Accelerator Programme entrant
- CO = College Accelerator Programme entrant
- NG = Next Gen Accelerator Program entrant
- w/o = Walkover
- r = Retired
- d = Defaulted

=== Finals ===
Quarterfinals
(Australia) Mark Woodforde	6	6	6
7	(Sweden) Thomas Enqvist	4	4	4
4	(Germany) Boris Becker	6	7^{11}	6
6	(Russia) Yevgeny Kafelnikov	4	6^{9}	1
5	(United States) Michael Chang	6	6	6
(Sweden) Mikael Tillström	0	2	4
8	(United States) Jim Courier	7^{9}	6	3	4	2
2	(United States) Andre Agassi	6^{7}	2	6	6	6

Semifinals
(Australia) Mark Woodforde	4	2	0
4	(Germany) Boris Becker	6	6	6
5	(United States) Michael Chang	6	6	7^{7}
2	(United States) Andre Agassi	1	4	6^{1}

Final
4	(Germany) Boris Becker	6	6	2	6
5	(United States) Michael Chang	2	4	6	2

=== Section 1 ===
First round
1	(United States) P Sampras	7	6	6
(Australia) R Fromberg	5	3	2
(United States) M Joyce	6	6	6
(Belgium) K Goossens	4	4	3
Q	(Germany) N Kiefer	6^{3}	0	1
(Australia) M Philippoussis	7^{7}	6	6
Q	(Russia) A Cherkasov	1	3	1
LL	(Israel) E Ran	6	6	6
(Germany) M Sinner	5	3	6	7	6
WC	(Australia) A Belobrajdic	7	6	4	5	3
(Japan) S Matsuoka	1	r
(Australia) M Woodforde	2
(Spain) E Sánchez	0	3	3
(Spain) F Clavet	6	6	6
(Belgium) F Dewulf	6	6	6
16	(Netherlands) P Haarhuis	4	4	4

Second round
1	(United States) P Sampras	3	6	6	6
(United States) M Joyce	6	3	4	4
(Australia) M Philippoussis	2	6	6	6
LL	(Israel) E Ran	6	4	4	2
(Germany) M Sinner	4	1	4
(Australia) M Woodforde	6	6	6
(Spain) F Clavet	2	7	6	6
(Belgium) F Dewulf	6	5	3	2

Third round
1	(United States) P Sampras	4	6^{9}	6^{3}
(Australia) M Philippoussis	6	7^{11}	7^{7}
(Australia) M Woodforde	4	7^{8}	6	6
(Spain) F Clavet	6	6^{6}	2	4

Fourth round
(Australia) M Philippoussis	2	2	2
(Australia) M Woodforde	6	6	6

=== Section 2 ===
First round
10	(Croatia) G Ivanišević	6	7^{11}	6
(Germany) B Karbacher	4	6^{9}	3
(Denmark) K Carlsen	6	6	3	4	5
Q	(Canada) S Lareau	4	4	6	6	7
(Spain) A Costa	4	4	7	3
(Brazil) F Meligeni	6	6	5	0	r
(Italy) R Furlan	2	6	7^{7}	5	9
(Australia) S Draper	6	3	6^{5}	7	7
WC	(Australia) J Morgan	2	4	5
(United States) D Wheaton	6	6	7
(Morocco) K Alami	6	2	0	1
(Argentina) H Gumy	4	6	6	6
(France) L Roux	6^{6}	7^{7}	6	1	5
(Romania) A Voinea	7^{8}	6^{2}	3	6	7
(Germany) M-K Goellner	3	2	4
7	(Sweden) T Enqvist	6	6	6

Second round
10	(Croatia) G Ivanišević	6	6	6
Q	(Canada) S Lareau	4	4	4
(Spain) A Costa	6	6^{4}	1	3
(Italy) R Furlan	1	7^{7}	6	6
(United States) D Wheaton	3	7^{7}	4	5
(Argentina) H Gumy	6	6^{3}	6	7
(Romania) A Voinea	4	4	1
7	(Sweden) T Enqvist	6	6	6

Third round
10	(Croatia) G Ivanišević	2	6	4	2
(Italy) R Furlan	6	3	6	6
(Argentina) H Gumy	2	6^{3}	6	1
7	(Sweden) T Enqvist	6	7^{7}	3	6

Fourth round
(Italy) R Furlan	5	0	3
7	(Sweden) T Enqvist	7	6	6

=== Section 3 ===
First round
4	(Germany) B Becker	6	3	4	6	6
(United Kingdom) G Rusedski	4	6	6	3	3
(Netherlands) J Eltingh	4	3	1
(Sweden) T Johansson	6	6	6
(Sweden) H Holm	3	2	4
(Zimbabwe) B Black	6	6	6
(Ecuador) N Lapentti	7^{7}	3	6^{3}	3
(Sweden) M Larsson	6^{1}	6	7^{7}	6
Q	(United States) B MacPhie	7	6	6
(Sweden) J Apell	5	4	4
(Portugal) N Marques	3	5	5
(New Zealand) B Steven	6	7	7
LL	(Italy) D Nargiso	6	7^{7}	4	2	6
(Germany) D Prinosil	4	6^{3}	6	6	3
(Netherlands) J Siemerink	4	7^{7}	7^{7}	7
(Austria) G Schaller	6	6^{4}	6^{3}	5

Second round
4	(Germany) B Becker	4	3	6	6	6
(Sweden) T Johansson	6	6	2	1	4
(Zimbabwe) B Black	3	6	4	4
(Sweden) M Larsson	6	3	6	6
Q	(United States) B MacPhie	1	7	6^{6}	4
(New Zealand) B Steven	6	5	7^{8}	6
LL	(Italy) D Nargiso	6	7	2	6^{8}	1
(Netherlands) J Siemerink	1	5	6	7^{10}	6

Third round
4	(Germany) B Becker	7^{7}	6	6
(Sweden) M Larsson	6^{5}	3	3
(New Zealand) B Steven	6	6	6^{3}	6
(Netherlands) J Siemerink	1	4	7^{7}	2

Fourth round
4	(Germany) B Becker	1	6	6	6
(New Zealand) B Steven	6	4	3	2

=== Section 4 ===
First round
12	(France) A Boetsch	4	7^{7}	6	6
(France) G Forget	6	6^{5}	3	3
(United States) M Washington	6	6	4	6
(Spain) J Sánchez	4	2	6	2
(Chile) M Ríos	3	4	3
(Australia) P Rafter	6	6	6
(Colombia) M Hadad	4	6	6	6
(Russia) A Chesnokov	6	4	2	2
(Australia) M Tebbutt	6	3	6	6
(Germany) C-U Steeb	3	6	1	4
WC	(Australia) P Tramacchi	7^{7}	7^{7}	6
(Hungary) S Noszály	6^{3}	6^{3}	2
(Spain) À Corretja	6	6	6
LL	(Sweden) L Jönsson	3	3	0
(France) F Santoro	1	1	5
6	(Russia) Y Kafelnikov	6	6	7

Second round
12	(France) A Boetsch	4	1	6	1
(United States) M Washington	6	6	3	6
(Australia) P Rafter	6^{5}	4	2	r
(Colombia) M Hadad	7^{7}	6	2
(Australia) M Tebbutt	6	6	7
WC	(Australia) P Tramacchi	3	4	5
(Spain) À Corretja	1	2	3
6	(Russia) Y Kafelnikov	6	6	6

Third round
(United States) M Washington	6	6	6
(Colombia) M Hadad	4	2	3
(Australia) M Tebbutt	5	7	4	2
6	(Russia) Y Kafelnikov	7	5	6	6

Fourth round
(United States) M Washington	3	2	4
6	(Russia) Y Kafelnikov	6	6	6

=== Section 5 ===
First round
5	(United States) M Chang	6	6	6
(Czech Republic) D Rikl	2	1	2
(Switzerland) J Hlasek	6	6	6
(Belgium) D Norman	4	1	1
(France) O Delaître	2	2	1
WC	(Australia) B Ellwood	6	6	6
(France) G Raoux	6	7^{7}	6
Q	(Sweden) M Norman	3	6^{2}	1
(Czech Republic) J Novák	6^{6}	5	6	7	1
(Sweden) S Edberg	7^{8}	7	3	5	6
Q	(France) J-P Fleurian	6	4	7^{7}	2
(Netherlands) S Schalken	3	6	6^{1}	1	r
(Germany) H Dreekmann	0	2	6	6	4
(Denmark) F Fetterlein	6	6	1	3	6
(Australia) J Stoltenberg	1	3	2
11	(Netherlands) R Krajicek	6	6	6

Second round
5	(United States) M Chang	6	6	6
(Switzerland) J Hlasek	1	3	3
WC	(Australia) B Ellwood	3	4	6^{5}
(France) G Raoux	6	6	7^{7}
(Sweden) S Edberg	4	6	6	2	3
Q	(France) J-P Fleurian	6	2	4	6	6
(Denmark) F Fetterlein	2	4	4
11	(Netherlands) R Krajicek	6	6	6

Third round
5	(United States) M Chang	6	6	7^{8}
(France) G Raoux	2	2	6^{6}
Q	(France) J-P Fleurian	4	6	2
11	(Netherlands) R Krajicek	6	3	2	r

Fourth round
5	(United States) M Chang	6	6	6
Q	(France) J-P Fleurian	2	3	4

=== Section 6 ===
First round
14	(Ukraine) A Medvedev	6	7	2	7^{9}
(Spain) C Moyà	4	5	6	6^{7}
Q	(Sweden) P Fredriksson	6	2	1	6^{4}
(United States) P McEnroe	3	6	6	7^{7}
Q	(France) R Gilbert	6	4	6^{8}	7	1
(Norway) C Ruud	4	6	7^{10}	5	6
(Sweden) M Tillström	6	6	1	5	6
(United States) A Krickstein	4	4	6	7	2
Q	(Sweden) N Kulti	5	7^{7}	6	6
(Italy) A Gaudenzi	7	6^{4}	4	2
(Spain) C Costa	1	6	0	7	6
(Russia) A Volkov	6	4	6	5	4
Q	(Canada) D Nestor	4	4	4
(Argentina) J Frana	6	6	6
Q	(France) T Guardiola	3	3	2
3	(Austria) T Muster	6	6	6

Second round
14	(Ukraine) A Medvedev	6	6	2	3	2
(United States) P McEnroe	3	2	6	6	6
(Norway) C Ruud	3	6	4	6	4
(Sweden) M Tillström	6	3	6	4	6
Q	(Sweden) N Kulti	6	6	6
(Spain) C Costa	3	2	2
(Argentina) J Frana	4	4	6	6^{4}
3	(Austria) T Muster	6	6	1	7^{7}

Third round
(United States) P McEnroe	6	1	6^{5}	3
(Sweden) M Tillström	1	6	7^{7}	6
Q	(Sweden) N Kulti	4	6^{9}	4
3	(Austria) T Muster	6	7^{11}	6

Fourth round
(Sweden) M Tillström	7	4	6	6
3	(Austria) T Muster	5	6	3	2

=== Section 7 ===
First round
8	(United States) J Courier	7	7^{7}	6
(Belgium) J Van Herck	5	6^{1}	4
WC	(Australia) P Kilderry	2	2	4
(United States) J Tarango	6	6	6
(Uzbekistan) O Ogorodov	5	4	4
(Australia) T Woodbridge	7	6	6
(Czech Republic) B Ulihrach	6	7^{10}	1
(Italy) S Pescosolido	4	6^{8}	0	r
(United States) C Adams	6	6^{4}	6^{2}	6	9
WC	(Australia) T Larkham	4	7^{7}	7^{7}	3	7
(United States) D Rostagno	7^{7}	1	2	5
(South Africa) M Ondruska	6^{5}	6	6	7
(Slovakia) K Kučera	7	6	6
Q	(South Africa) D Adams	5	0	0
(United States) J Stark	2	1	6	6	5
9	(South Africa) W Ferreira	6	6	3	3	7

Second round
8	(United States) J Courier	7	6^{2}	6	6
(United States) J Tarango	5	7^{7}	4	3
(Australia) T Woodbridge	6	4	6	6
(Czech Republic) B Ulihrach	3	6	2	4
(United States) C Adams	5	6^{3}	6	0
(South Africa) M Ondruska	7	7^{7}	3	6
(Slovakia) K Kučera	6	6	6
9	(South Africa) W Ferreira	1	3	0

Third round
8	(United States) J Courier	6	6^{2}	7^{7}	3	8
(Australia) T Woodbridge	3	7^{7}	6^{3}	6	6
(South Africa) M Ondruska	6	4	6	6
(Slovakia) K Kučera	2	6	3	0

Fourth round
8	(United States) J Courier	7	2	4	6	6
(South Africa) M Ondruska	5	6	6	4	2

=== Section 8 ===
First round
15	(United States) T Martin	6	6^{5}	6	6
(Czech Republic) D Vacek	4	7^{7}	3	4
(United States) R Reneberg	6	6^{3}	6	1	6
(Czech Republic) M Damm	3	7^{7}	3	6	2
(Sweden) J Björkman	7	6	6^{0}	6^{3}	6
WC	(Australia) A Ilie	5	3	7^{7}	7^{7}	1
(United Kingdom) T Henman	5	7^{7}	6	6
(Czech Republic) P Korda	7	6^{4}	3	4
Q	(Australia) H Denman	3	2	4
Q	(United States) S Bryan	6	6	6
(Peru) J Yzaga	3	5	4
WC	(Australia) S Stolle	6	7	6
Q	(South Africa) D Nainkin	2	0	1
(United States) V Spadea	6	6	6
Q	(Argentina) G Etlis	6	6^{2}	6	6^{5}	3
2	(United States) A Agassi	3	7^{7}	4	7^{7}	6

Second round
15	(United States) T Martin	6	7	3	7^{7}
(United States) R Reneberg	2	5	6	6^{5}
(Sweden) J Björkman	6	6	6
(United Kingdom) T Henman	1	3	2
Q	(United States) S Bryan	6	7^{9}	6
WC	(Australia) S Stolle	3	6^{7}	1
(United States) V Spadea	4	2	3
2	(United States) A Agassi	6	6	6

Third round
15	(United States) T Martin	3	6	3	6	1
(Sweden) J Björkman	6	3	6	2	6
Q	(United States) S Bryan	6	0	2	1
2	(United States) A Agassi	4	6	6	6

Fourth round
(Sweden) J Björkman	6	2	6	1	2
2	(United States) A Agassi	4	6	4	6	6

Preceded by 1995 US Open – Men's singles	Grand Slam men's singles	Succeeded by 1996 French Open – Men's singles
