= 1996 International ÖTV Raiffeisen Grand Prix =

- Date: 20–26 May
- Edition: 16th
- Category: World Series
- Draw: 32S / 16D
- Prize money: $400,000
- Surface: Clay / outdoor
- Location: Sankt Pölten, Austria

Champions

Singles
- (Chile) Marcelo Ríos

Doubles
- (Czech Republic) Ctislav Doseděl / (Czech Republic) Pavel Vízner
← 1995 ·	International ÖTV Raiffeisen Grand Prix	· 1997 →

The 1996 International ÖTV Raiffeisen Grand Prix was a men's tennis tournament played on outdoor clay courts in Sankt Pölten in Austria and was part of the World Series of the 1996 ATP Tour. It was the 16th edition of the tournament and ran from 20 May until 26 May 1996. Second-seeded Marcelo Ríos won the singles title.

== Finals ==
=== Singles ===
(Chile) Marcelo Ríos defeated (Spain) Félix Mantilla 6–2, 6–4

- It was Ríos' only singles title of the year and the 4th of his career.

=== Doubles ===
(Czech Republic) Ctislav Doseděl / (Czech Republic) Pavel Vízner defeated (South Africa) David Adams / (Netherlands) Menno Oosting 6–7, 6–4, 6–3

- It was Doseděl's 2nd title of the year and the 3rd of his career. It was Vízner's 1st title of the year and the 1st of his career.
