= 1996 Australian Open – Women's singles =

Women's singles
- 1996 Australian Open

Final
- Champion: (United States) Monica Seles
- Runner-up: (Germany) Anke Huber
- Score: 6–4, 6–1

Details
- Draw: 128
- Seeds: 16

Events
Singles	men	women		boys	girls
Doubles	men	women	mixed	boys	girls
WC Singles	men	women	quad
WC Doubles	men	women	quad
Legends	men	women	mixed
- Australian Open

Monica Seles defeated Anke Huber in the final, 6–4, 6–1 to win the women's singles tennis title at the 1996 Australian Open. It was her fourth Australian Open title and ninth and last major title overall, and her only major title after being stabbed in April 1993. By virtue of her undefeated record in four appearances at the event (also winning in 1991, 1992, and 1993), Seles became the first player in the Open Era to win a major on all of their first four appearances at the event.

Mary Pierce was the defending champion, but lost to Elena Likhovtseva in the second round.

== Seeds ==
1. (United States) Monica Seles (champion)
2. (Spain) Conchita Martínez (quarterfinals)
3. (Spain) Arantxa Sánchez Vicario (quarterfinals)
4. (France) Mary Pierce (second round)
5. (Japan) Kimiko Date (second round)
6. (Argentina) Gabriela Sabatini (fourth round)
7. (Croatia) Iva Majoli (quarterfinals)
8. (Germany) Anke Huber (final)
9. (United States) Mary Joe Fernández (fourth round)
10. (United States) Lindsay Davenport (fourth round)
11. (Netherlands) Brenda Schultz-McCarthy (fourth round)
12. (Belarus) Natasha Zvereva (first round)
13. (United States) Chanda Rubin (semifinals)
14. (United States) Amy Frazier (first round)
15. (Japan) Naoko Sawamatsu (fourth round)
16. (South Africa) Amanda Coetzer (semifinals)

== Draw ==
Key

- Q = Qualifier
- WC = Wild card
- LL = Lucky loser
- Alt = Alternate
- ITF = ITF entry
- PR = Protected ranking
- SR = Special ranking
- SE = Special exempt
- JE = Junior exempt
- JR = Junior Accelerator Programme entrant
- CO = College Accelerator Programme entrant
- NG = Next Gen Accelerator Program entrant
- w/o = Walkover
- r = Retired
- d = Defaulted

=== Finals ===
Quarterfinals
1	(United States) Monica Seles	6	6
7	(Croatia) Iva Majoli	1	2
3	(Spain) Arantxa Sánchez Vicario	4	6	14
13	(United States) Chanda Rubin	6	2	16
(Switzerland) Martina Hingis	5	6	1
16	(South Africa) Amanda Coetzer	7	4	6
8	(Germany) Anke Huber	4	6	6
2	(Spain) Conchita Martínez	6	2	1

Semifinals
1	(United States) Monica Seles	6^{2}	6	7
13	(United States) Chanda Rubin	7^{7}	1	5
16	(South Africa) Amanda Coetzer	6	4	2
8	(Germany) Anke Huber	4	6	6

Final
1	(United States) Monica Seles	6	6
8	(Germany) Anke Huber	4	1

=== Top half ===
==== Section 1 ====
First round
1	(United States) M Seles	6	6
Q	(United States) J Lee	3	0
(Slovakia) K Studeníková	7	6
(Belgium) D Van Roost	5	4
Q	(Italy) F Lubiani	6	4	6
(Australia) N Bradtke	2	6	4
(France) J Halard-Decugis	6	6
WC	(Australia) J Taylor	1	1
(Slovakia) R Zrubáková	6	5	1
(Japan) A Sugiyama	0	7	6
(France) S Pitkowski	4	6^{3}
Q	(France) A Dechaume-Balleret	6	7^{7}
(Slovakia) J Husárová	2	1
(United States) L Wild	6	6
(Romania) C Cristea	6	2	1
15	(Japan) N Sawamatsu	4	6	6

Second round
1	(United States) M Seles	6	6
(Slovakia) K Studeníková	1	1
Q	(Italy) F Lubiani	2	6	2
(France) J Halard-Decugis	6	0	6
(Japan) A Sugiyama	6	6
Q	(France) A Dechaume-Balleret	2	2
(United States) L Wild	4	3
15	(Japan) N Sawamatsu	6	6

Third round
1	(United States) M Seles	7	6
(France) J Halard-Decugis	5	0
(Japan) A Sugiyama	4	0
15	(Japan) N Sawamatsu	6	6

Fourth round
1	(United States) M Seles	6	6
15	(Japan) N Sawamatsu	1	3

==== Section 2 ====
First round
12	(Belarus) N Zvereva	2	6	5
(Israel) A Smashnova	6	4	7
(United States) T Whitlinger-Jones	6	6
(Japan) N Kijimuta	3	0
(Romania) I Spîrlea	6	6^{4}	8
(France) S Testud	4	7^{7}	6
(Italy) N Baudone	5	4
(Belgium) S Appelmans	7	6
Q	(United States) J Watanabe	6	6
(South Africa) M de Swardt	4	3
(United States) P Shriver	4	4
(France) A Fusai	6	6
WC	(Australia) N Pratt	5	3
(United States) L McNeil	7	6
(Russia) E Makarova	4	2
7	(Croatia) I Majoli	6	6

Second round
(Israel) A Smashnova	7	4	2
(United States) T Whitlinger-Jones	5	6	6
(Romania) I Spîrlea	3	3
(Belgium) S Appelmans	6	6
Q	(United States) J Watanabe	6^{5}	6^{5}
(France) A Fusai	7^{7}	7^{7}
(United States) L McNeil	3	2
7	(Croatia) I Majoli	6	6

Third round
(United States) T Whitlinger-Jones	3	2
(Belgium) S Appelmans	6	6
(France) A Fusai	2	1
7	(Croatia) I Majoli	6	6

Fourth round
(Belgium) S Appelmans	2	2
7	(Croatia) I Majoli	6	6

==== Section 3 ====
First round
3	(Spain) A Sánchez Vicario	6	6
(Austria) B Reinstadler	2	2
(United States) A Grossman	3	2
(Germany) B Rittner	6	6
(Australia) K Godridge	4	6	3
WC	(Australia) S Drake-Brockman	6	4	6
(United States) S Cacic	6	6
(Belgium) E Callens	3	4
(United States) N Arendt	6	6
WC	(Australia) K Radford	3	1
(France) L Ghirardi-Rubbi	3	4
(Italy) S Farina	6	6
(Germany) V Martinek	2	3
(Spain) M Sánchez Lorenzo	6	6
(Spain) V Ruano Pascual	4	3
9	(United States) MJ Fernández	6	6

Second round
3	(Spain) A Sánchez Vicario	6	6
(Germany) B Rittner	3	2
WC	(Australia) S Drake-Brockman	2	5
(United States) S Cacic	6	7
(United States) N Arendt	3	6	8
(Italy) S Farina	6	3	6
(Spain) M Sánchez Lorenzo	2	0
9	(United States) MJ Fernández	6	6

Third round
3	(Spain) A Sánchez Vicario	6	6
(United States) S Cacic	3	3
(United States) N Arendt	1	1
9	(United States) MJ Fernández	6	6

Fourth round
3	(Spain) A Sánchez Vicario	6	6
9	(United States) MJ Fernández	3	3

==== Section 4 ====
First round
13	(United States) C Rubin	4	6	6
(Australia) R McQuillan	6	3	2
(Slovenia) T Križan	6	2	6
(United States) M McGrath	2	6	4
(Belgium) L Courtois	7^{7}	7^{7}
(Netherlands) M Oremans	6^{4}	6^{4}
(Australia) A Ellwood	6	5	1
(South Africa) J Kruger	4	7	6
(Germany) K Kschwendt	6	6
(Germany) P Begerow	0	2
(Japan) N Miyagi	6	7
(Italy) S Cecchini	3	5
(France) I Demongeot	3	3
(Slovakia) K Habšudová	6	6
(United States) S Stafford	0	1
6	(Argentina) G Sabatini	6	6

Second round
13	(United States) C Rubin	6^{3}	6	6
(Slovenia) T Križan	7^{7}	2	3
(Belgium) L Courtois	6	7^{7}
(South Africa) J Kruger	3	6^{5}
(Germany) K Kschwendt	2	6	6
(Japan) N Miyagi	6	2	1
(Slovakia) K Habšudová	4	3
6	(Argentina) G Sabatini	6	6

Third round
13	(United States) C Rubin	6	6
(Belgium) L Courtois	0	2
(Germany) K Kschwendt	1	2
6	(Argentina) G Sabatini	6	6

Fourth round
13	(United States) C Rubin	6	6
6	(Argentina) G Sabatini	2	4

=== Bottom half ===
==== Section 5 ====
First round
5	(Japan) K Date	6	6
(Mexico) A Gavaldón	2	0
(Japan) M Endo	7^{8}	6
WC	(Australia) K-A Guse	6^{6}	4
(Canada) J Nejedly	1	1
(Switzerland) M Hingis	6	6
(Austria) B Paulus	6	6
(Latvia) L Neiland	0	0
(Belgium) N Feber	6	6
Q	(Canada) S Jeyaseelan	4	0
(Italy) A Serra Zanetti	3	2
(Netherlands) K Boogert	6	6
(Hungary) A Temesvári	6^{5}	1
(Chinese Taipei) S-t Wang	7^{7}	6
(Canada) P Hy-Boulais	6	6^{3}	3
11	(Netherlands) B Schultz-McCarthy	1	7^{7}	6

Second round
5	(Japan) K Date	2	6	4
(Japan) M Endo	6	1	6
(Switzerland) M Hingis	6	6
(Austria) B Paulus	1	4
(Belgium) N Feber	2	6	3
(Netherlands) K Boogert	6	1	6
(Chinese Taipei) S-t Wang	4	6	3
11	(Netherlands) B Schultz-McCarthy	6	3	6

Third round
(Japan) M Endo	1	1
(Switzerland) M Hingis	6	6
(Netherlands) K Boogert	6	1	4
11	(Netherlands) B Schultz-McCarthy	4	6	6

Fourth round
(Switzerland) M Hingis	6	6
11	(Netherlands) B Schultz-McCarthy	1	4

==== Section 6 ====
First round
16	(South Africa) A Coetzer	6	6
(Austria) M Schnell	2	2
(Germany) S Hack	2	6	6
(Indonesia) Y Basuki	6	4	4
Q	(United States) L Poruri	6	6^{5}	6
(United States) L Lee	3	7^{7}	3
(Argentina) MJ Gaidano	6	3	2
Q	(Japan) R Hiraki	3	6	6
(United States) L Raymond	4	3
(Italy) R Grande	6	6
(Hong Kong) M Tang	6	4	2
(Germany) S Meier	0	6	6
(Japan) K Nagatsuka	2	4
(Russia) E Likhovtseva	6	6
(Austria) P Schwarz	3	1
4	(France) M Pierce	6	6

Second round
16	(South Africa) A Coetzer	6	6
(Germany) S Hack	1	1
Q	(United States) L Poruri	3	6	2
Q	(Japan) R Hiraki	6	4	6
(Italy) R Grande	6	7^{7}
(Germany) S Meier	4	6^{5}
(Russia) E Likhovtseva	6	6
4	(France) M Pierce	4	4

Third round
16	(South Africa) A Coetzer	6	6
Q	(Japan) R Hiraki	3	1
(Italy) R Grande	3	1
(Russia) E Likhovtseva	6	6

Fourth round
16	(South Africa) A Coetzer	6	6
(Russia) E Likhovtseva	3	3

==== Section 7 ====
First round
8	(Germany) A Huber	6	6
(Czech Republic) S Kleinová	1	4
(Sweden) Å Carlsson	6	6
WC	(Australia) K Sharpe	2	0
(Sweden) M Strandlund	5	6^{4}
(Madagascar) D Randriantefy	7	7^{7}
(Czech Republic) L Richterová	6	6
WC	(Australia) G Biggs	3	3
(Czech Republic) H Suková	6	6
(Austria) J Wiesner	4	0
(Poland) M Grzybowska	4	6	6
WC	(Australia) T Musgrave	6	3	2
(Venezuela) M Vento	7^{7}	4	4
(South Korea) S-h Park	6^{2}	6	6
(Austria) B Schett	4	7	9
14	(United States) A Frazier	6	5	7

Second round
8	(Germany) A Huber	6	6
(Sweden) Å Carlsson	1	2
(Madagascar) D Randriantefy	6^{4}	6	5
(Czech Republic) L Richterová	7^{7}	4	7
(Czech Republic) H Suková	7^{7}	4	8
(Poland) M Grzybowska	6^{5}	6	6
(South Korea) S-h Park	4	3
(Austria) B Schett	6	6

Third round
8	(Germany) A Huber	6	6
(Czech Republic) L Richterová	2	1
(Czech Republic) H Suková	2	7	6
(Austria) B Schett	6	5	8

Fourth round
8	(Germany) A Huber	6	6
(Austria) B Schett	3	2

==== Section 8 ====
First round
10	(United States) L Davenport	6	6
(Germany) C Singer	1	2
(United States) G Fernández	3	4
(Australia) R Stubbs	6	6
(Poland) K Nowak	3	0
(Finland) N Dahlman	6	6
(United States) E deLone	6	2	4
(Romania) R Dragomir	4	6	6
(Japan) Y Kamio	2	7^{7}	6
(China) F Li	6	6^{4}	2
(Federal Republic of Yugoslavia) T Ječmenica	4	3
(Germany) J Kandarr	6	6
(China) J-Q Yi	2	2
(Argentina) F Labat	6	6
Q	(United Kingdom) C Wood	4	1
2	(Spain) C Martínez	6	6

Second round
10	(United States) L Davenport	7^{7}	6
(Australia) R Stubbs	6^{5}	3
(Finland) N Dahlman	6	6
(Romania) R Dragomir	4	3
(Japan) Y Kamio	6^{3}	3
(Germany) J Kandarr	7^{7}	6
(Argentina) F Labat	2	4
2	(Spain) C Martínez	6	6

Third round
10	(United States) L Davenport	6	7
(Finland) N Dahlman	4	5
(Germany) J Kandarr	3	0
2	(Spain) C Martínez	6	6

Fourth round
10	(United States) L Davenport	3	1
2	(Spain) C Martínez	6	6

Preceded by 1995 US Open – Women's singles	Grand Slam women's singles	Succeeded by 1996 French Open – Women's singles
