= Chanda Rubin =

American tennis player (born 1976)

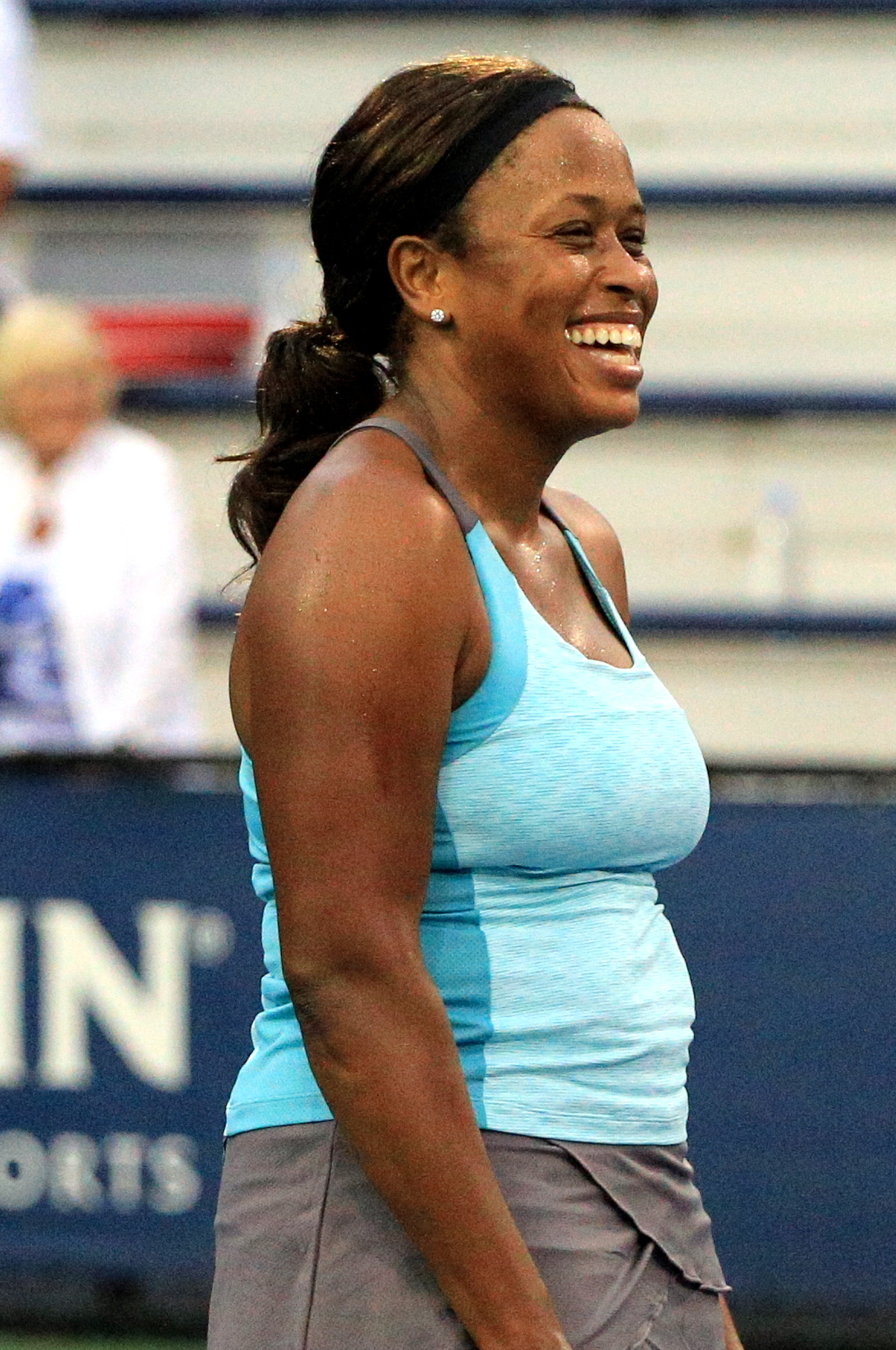
- Rubin at the 2015 US Open
- Country (sports): United States
- Residence: Lafayette, Louisiana, US
- Born: February 18, 1976 (age 50) Lafayette, US
- Height: 1.68 m (5 ft 6 in)
- Turned pro: August 1991
- Retired: October 2006
- Plays: Right-handed (two-handed backhand)
- Prize money: $4,470,180

Singles
- Career record: 399–254
- Career titles: 7
- Highest ranking: No. 6 (April 8, 1996)

Grand Slam singles results
- Australian Open: SF (1996)
- French Open: QF (1995, 2000, 2003)
- Wimbledon: 4R (2002)
- US Open: 4R (1992, 1995, 2002)

Other tournaments
- Tour Finals: RR (2003)
- Olympic Games: 3R (2004)

Doubles
- Career record: 227–161
- Career titles: 10
- Highest ranking: No. 9 (April 15, 1996)

Grand Slam doubles results
- Australian Open: W (1996)
- French Open: SF (2003)
- Wimbledon: SF (2002)
- US Open: F (1999)

Other doubles tournaments
- Olympic Games: 1R (2004)
Medal record
Representing the United States
Pan American Games
Silver medal – second place	1995 Mar del Plata	Doubles
Bronze medal – third place	1995 Mar del Plata	Singles

Chanda Rubin (born February 18, 1976) is an American former top-10 professional tennis player. During her career, she reached the semifinals at the 1996 Australian Open, the quarterfinals of the French Open three times, and had wins over world No. 1s Serena Williams and Martina Hingis. In doubles, she won the 1996 Australian Open with Arantxa Sánchez Vicario and alongside Sandrine Testud, were runners-up at the 1999 US Open.

== Early life and family ==
Rubin was born to Edward D. Rubin, a state judge in Louisiana, and Bernadette Fontenot Rubin. She was the middle child of three siblings. As a child, she was taught the sport of tennis by Nehemiah Atkinson.

She married Mireyou Hollier in April 2015, and their daughter was born in October 2016.

In early 2016, her younger brother, Edward Rubin Jr., died aged 38 at his home in Lafayette, Louisiana.

== Tennis career ==
In 1992, Rubin won the girls' singles title at Wimbledon, and reached a peak ranking of world No. 2 in the ITF Junior rankings.

Rubin's breakthrough season on the professional tour was 1995. In the third round of the French Open, she made a comeback from 0–5, 0–40 down in the third set against 5th seed Jana Novotná, saving nine match points before eventually winning 8–6. She went on to reach her maiden Grand Slam quarterfinal, losing to world No. 1 Arantxa Sánchez Vicario, the tournament's defending champion and eventual runner-up. In the second round of Wimbledon, Rubin defeated Patricia Hy-Boulais 7–6, 6–7, 17–15, the longest women's match in Wimbledon history. At the LA Tennis Championships in August, she defeated world No. 8 Gabriela Sabatini and world No. 2 Sánchez Vicario, on her way to the final, where she lost to world No. 3 Conchita Martínez in three sets.

In 1996, Rubin reached the Australian Open semifinals, defeating Sabatini in the fourth round and Sánchez Vicario 6–4, 2–6, 16–14 in the quarterfinals. The 48 games played in their quarterfinal were the most for a women's match at the Australian Open, a record which would be tied by Lauren Davis and Simona Halep in 2018. Rubin lost in the semifinals to eventual champion Monica Seles 6–7, 6–1, 7–5, despite holding a 5–2 lead in the third set. A few days later, she and Sánchez Vicario won the doubles title, defeating third-seeded Lindsay Davenport and Mary Joe Fernández in the final.

Rubin rose to a career-high singles ranking of No. 6 after reaching the final of the 1996 Miami Open where she lost to world No. 1 Steffi Graf. During the tournament, Rubin fractured a bone in her right hand. She eventually underwent surgery in August and missed the majority of the rest of the season.

Rubin is known to have played at the very first official match of the Arthur Ashe Stadium, at the 1997 US Open, in which she faced Tamarine Tanasugarn of Thailand and lost in two sets.

Representing the United States, Rubin won the 1997 Hopman Cup alongside Justin Gimelstob. She remained undefeated through three ties and the final in her singles matches. At the Linz Open, Rubin defeated world No. 4 Jana Novotná on the way to her first singles title.

In Indian Wells in 1999, Rubin defeated both Amanda Coetzer and world No. 1, Martina Hingis, in straight sets on her way to the semifinals. She also won her second career title at the Hobart International.

Rubin underwent arthroscopic surgery on her left knee in 2001 after the Australian Open, and then suffered a left Achilles tendon injury in April, thereby missing the majority of the season.

In 2002, Rubin underwent surgery on her left knee again, missing the first half of the season. In August, she defeated Lindsay Davenport, Jelena Dokic and world No. 1 Serena Williams on her way to the title in Los Angeles. Her upset of Williams ended the top-ranked player's winning streak of 21 matches, a stretch that had carried Williams through titles at the French Open and Wimbledon.

At the 2003 Miami Open, Rubin defeated Amélie Mauresmo and Justine Henin in straight sets en route to the semifinals, after which she peaked again at No. 6 in the rankings. She reached her third and final French Open quarterfinal and also won the Eastbourne International title for a second time, defeating Jennifer Capriati in the semifinals and Conchita Martínez in the final. It would be Rubin's last career title.

Rubin missed the majority of the 2004–2006 seasons due to the persistent knee injury. Her last professional match was in October 2006 in Quebec City.

Rubin was inducted into the Southern Tennis Hall of Fame in 2009 and the Louisiana Sports Hall of Fame in 2013.

== Post-retirement ==
In 2013, Rubin completed a four-year Bachelor of Liberal Arts in Extension Studies with a concentration in Economics at Harvard Extension School, graduating cum laude.

In recent years, she has developed a career in broadcasting, working for Tennis Channel as a presenter and commentator.

== Awards ==
- 1995: ATA Athlete of the Year
- 1995: TENNIS Magazine Most Improved Player of the Year
- 1995: US Tennis Association Female Athlete of the Year
- 1995: WTA Most Improved Player of the Year
- 1997: Arthur Ashe Leadership Award
- 2002: Family Circle Player Who Makes a Difference Award
- 2003: USTA Service Bowl Award
- 2008: International Lawn Tennis Danzig Trophy

== Grand Slam tournament finals ==
=== Doubles: 2 (1 title, 1 runner-up) ===
Result	Year	Championship	Partner	Opponents	Score
Win	1996	Australian Open	(Spain) Arantxa Sánchez Vicario	(United States) Lindsay Davenport (United States) Mary Joe Fernández	7–5, 2–6, 6–4
Loss	1999	US Open	(France) Sandrine Testud	(United States) Serena Williams (United States) Venus Williams	6–4, 1–6, 4–6

== WTA Tour finals ==
=== Singles: 19 (7 titles, 12 runner-ups) ===
Result	W/L	Date	Tournament	Surface	Opponent	Score
Loss	0–1	Nov 1991	Scottsdale Championships, U.S.	Hard	(Belgium) Sabine Appelmans	5–7, 1–6
Loss	0–2	Feb 1994	Chicago Cup, U.S.	Hard (i)	(Belarus) Natasha Zvereva	3–6, 5–7
Loss	0–3	Jun 1995	Eastbourne International, UK	Grass	(France) Nathalie Tauziat	6–3, 0–6, 5–7
Loss	0–4	Aug 1995	LA Championships, U.S.	Hard	(Spain) Conchita Martínez	6–4, 1–6, 3–6
Loss	0–5	Mar 1996	Key Biscayne, U.S.	Hard	(Germany) Steffi Graf	1–6, 3–6
Win	1–5	Feb 1997	Linz Open, Austria	Hard (i)	(Slovakia) Karina Habšudová	6–4, 6–2
Loss	1–6	Nov 1998	Tournoi de Québec, Canada	Carpet (i)	(United States) Tara Snyder	6–4, 4–6, 6–7^{(6–8)}
Win	2–6	Jan 1999	Hobart International, Australia	Hard	(Italy) Rita Grande	6–2, 6–3
Loss	2–7	Nov 1999	Tournoi de Québec, Canada	Carpet (i)	(United States) Jennifer Capriati	6–4, 1–6, 2–6
Loss	2–8	Jan 2000	Hobart International, Australia	Hard	(Belgium) Kim Clijsters	6–2, 2–6, 2–6
Win	3–8	Nov 2000	Tournoi de Québec, Canada	Carpet (i)	(United States) Jennifer Capriati	6–4, 6–2
Loss	3–9	May 2002	Madrid Open, Spain	Clay	(United States) Monica Seles	4–6, 2–6
Win	4–9	Jun 2002	Eastbourne International, UK	Grass	(Russia) Anastasia Myskina	6–1, 6–3
Win	5–9	Aug 2002	LA Championships, U.S.	Hard	(United States) Lindsay Davenport	5–7, 7–6^{(7–5)}, 6–3
Win	6–9	May 2003	Madrid Open, Spain	Clay	(Spain) María Sánchez Lorenzo	6–4, 5–7, 6–4
Win	7–9	Jun 2003	Eastbourne International, UK	Grass	(Spain) Conchita Martínez	6–4, 3–6, 6–4
Loss	7–10	Sep 2003	Bali International, Indonesia	Hard	(Russia) Elena Dementieva	2–6, 1–6
Loss	7–11	Sep 2003	China Open, Shanghai	Hard	(Russia) Elena Dementieva	3–6, 6–7^{(6–8)}
Loss	7–12	Oct 2003	Luxembourg Open	Hard (i)	(Belgium) Kim Clijsters	2–6, 5–7

=== Doubles: 17 (10 titles, 7 runner-ups) ===
Legend
Grand Slam (1–1)
Tier I (1–1)
Tier II (5–3)
Tier III (1–2)
Tier IV (2–0)

Result	W/L	Date	Tournament	Surface	Partner	Opponents	Score
Win	1–0	Sep 1993	Tokyo Championships, Japan	Hard	(United States) Lisa Raymond	(South Africa) Amanda Coetzer (United States) Linda Wild	6–4, 6–1
Win	2–0	Jan 1994	Hobart International, Australia	Hard	(United States) Linda Wild	(Australia) Jenny Byrne (Australia) Rachel McQuillan	7–5, 4–6, 7–6
Loss	1–2	Nov 1994	Tournoi de Québec, Canada	Carpet (i)	(United States) Linda Wild	(South Africa) Elna Reinach (France) Nathalie Tauziat	4–6, 3–6
Win	3–1	May 1995	Prague Open, Czech Republic	Clay	(United States) Linda Wild	(Sweden) Maria Lindström (Sweden) Maria Strandlund	6–7, 6–3, 6–2
Loss	3–2	Oct 1995	Zurich Open, Switzerland	Hard (i)	(Netherlands) Caroline Vis	(United States) Nicole Arendt (Netherlands) Manon Bollegraf	4–6, 6–7^{(4–7)}, 4–6
Win	4–2	Jan 1996	Australian Open, Melbourne	Hard	(Spain) Arantxa Sánchez Vicario	(United States) Lindsay Davenport (United States) Mary Joe Fernández	7–5, 2–6, 6–4
Win	5–2	Feb 1996	Oklahoma South Cup, U.S.	Hard (i)	(Netherlands) Brenda Schultz-McCarthy	(United States) Katrina Adams (United States) Debbie Graham	6–4, 6–3
Win	6–2	Mar 1996	Indian Wells Open, U.S.	Hard	(Netherlands) Brenda Schultz-McCarthy	(France) Julie Halard-Decugis (France) Nathalie Tauziat	6–1, 6–4
Win	7–2	Apr 1996	Amelia Island Championships, U.S.	Clay	(Spain) Arantxa Sánchez Vicario	(United States) Meredith McGrath (Latvia) Larisa Neiland	6–1, 6–1
Loss	7–3	Sep 1997	Tokyo Princess Cup, Japan	Hard	(France) Julie Halard-Decugis	(United States) Monica Seles (Japan) Ai Sugiyama	1–6, 0–6
Loss	7–4	Oct 1998	Tournoi de Québec, Canada	Carpet (i)	(France) Sandrine Testud	(United States) Lori McNeil (United States) Kimberly Po	7–6^{(7–3)}, 5–7, 4–6
Loss	7–5	Sep 1999	US Open, New York	Hard	(France) Sandrine Testud	(United States) Serena Williams (United States) Venus Williams	6–4, 1–6, 4–6
Win	8–5	Oct 1999	Porsche Grand Prix, Germany	Hard (i)	(France) Sandrine Testud	(Spain) Arantxa Sánchez Vicario (Latvia) Larisa Neiland	6–3, 6–4
Loss	8–6	Nov 1999	Philadelphia Championships, U.S.	Carpet (i)	(France) Sandrine Testud	(United States) Lisa Raymond (Australia) Rennae Stubbs	1–6, 6–7^{(2–7)}
Win	9–6	Jul 2000	Stanford Classic, U.S.	Hard	(France) Sandrine Testud	(Zimbabwe) Cara Black (United States) Amy Frazier	6–4, 6–4
Win	10–6	Oct 2000	Linz Open, Austria	Carpet (i)	(France) Amélie Mauresmo	(Japan) Ai Sugiyama (France) Nathalie Tauziat	6–4, 6–4
Loss	10–7	Oct 2001	Linz Open, Austria	Hard (i)	(Belgium) Els Callens	(Serbia and Montenegro) Jelena Dokic (Russia) Nadia Petrova	1–6, 4–6

== Singles performance timeline ==
Key
W	F	SF	QF	#R	RR	Q#	DNQ	A	NH

(W) winner; (F) finalist; (SF) semifinalist; (QF) quarterfinalist; (#R) rounds 4, 3, 2, 1; (RR) round-robin stage; (Q#) qualification round; (DNQ) did not qualify; (A) absent; (NH) not held; (SR) strike rate (events won / competed); (W–L) win–loss record.

Tournament	1990	1991	1992	1993	1994	1995	1996	1997	1998	1999	2000	2001	2002	2003	2004	2005	2006	2007
Australian Open	A	A	1R	1R	4R	2R	SF	4R	1R	4R	2R	1R	A	4R	4R	A	A	A
French Open	A	Q2	1R	A	1R	QF	A	2R	4R	2R	QF	A	4R	QF	A	Q1	A	A
Wimbledon	A	Q1	1R	2R	1R	3R	A	1R	3R	1R	1R	1R	4R	3R	1R	A	A	A
US Open	1R	2R	4R	3R	1R	4R	A	1R	2R	1R	3R	3R	4R	1R	3R	A	1R	A
Grand Slam SR	0 / 1	0 / 1	0 / 4	0 / 3	0 / 4	0 / 4	0 / 1	0 / 4	0 / 4	0 / 4	0 / 4	0 / 3	0 / 3	0 / 4	0 / 3	0 / 0	0 / 1	0 / 0
WTA Tour Championships	A	A	A	A	A	1R	A	A	A	A	1R	A	1R	RR	A	A	A	A
Year-end ranking	521	83	83	69	23	15	17	30	34	22	13	54	13	9	53	546	481	NR

== Wins over top 10 players ==
Season	1995	1996	1997	1998	1999	2000	2001	2002	2003	Total
Wins	5	4	2	0	2	1	0	4	4	22

#	Player	Rank	Event	Surface	Rd	Score	Rubin Rank
1995
1.	(Czech Republic) Jana Novotná	5	French Open	Clay	3R	7–6, 4–6, 8–6	53
2.	(Japan) Kimiko Date	6	Eastbourne, UK	Grass	QF	6–3, 6–0	29
3.	(Argentina) Gabriela Sabatini	8	Manhattan Beach, U.S.	Hard	QF	6–7, 7–6, 6–0	22
4.	(Spain) Arantxa Sánchez Vicario	2	Manhattan Beach, U.S.	Hard	SF	6–3, 6–1	22
5.	(United States) Lindsay Davenport	9	Filderstadt, Germany	Carpet (i)	3R	4–6, 6–2, 6–4	15
1996
6.	(Argentina) Gabriela Sabatini	7	Australian Open	Hard	4R	6–2, 6–4	14
7.	(Spain) Arantxa Sánchez Vicario	3	Australian Open	Hard	QF	6–4, 2–6, 16-14	14
8.	(Argentina) Gabriela Sabatini	6	Miami, U.S.	Hard	QF	6–3, 5–7, 6–3	9
9.	(Croatia) Iva Majoli	8	Philadelphia, U.S.	Carpet (i)	R3	5–7, 6–2, 6–1	14
1997
10.	(Czech Republic) Jana Novotná	4	Linz, Austria	Carpet (i)	SF	7–5, 5–7, 6–3	22
11.	(Slovakia) Karina Habšudová	10	Linz, Austria	Carpet (i)	F	6–4, 6–2	22
1999
12.	(South Africa) Amanda Coetzer	9	Indian Wells, U.S.	Hard	4R	6–4, 6–4	26
13.	(Switzerland) Martina Hingis	1	Indian Wells, U.S.	Hard	QF	6–3, 7–6	26
2000
14.	(France) Nathalie Tauziat	6	French Open	Clay	3R	6–4, 7–6	25
2002
15.	(United States) Serena Williams	1	Manhattan Beach, U.S.	Hard	QF	6–2, 4–6, 7–5	21
16.	(Australia) Jelena Dokic	5	Manhattan Beach, U.S.	Hard	SF	6–0, 6–2	21
17.	(United States) Lindsay Davenport	9	Manhattan Beach, U.S.	Hard	F	5–7, 7–6, 6–3	21
18.	(Australia) Jelena Dokic	8	Linz, Austria	Hard (i)	QF	7–5, 6–2	14
2003
19.	(France) Amélie Mauresmo	4	Miami, U.S.	Hard	4R	6–3, 6–2	10
20.	(Belgium) Justine Henin	7	Miami, U.S.	Hard	QF	6–0, 6–2	10
21.	(United States) Jennifer Capriati	8	Eastbourne, UK	Grass	SF	2–6, 7–6, 6–2	7
22.	(France) Amélie Mauresmo	6	WTA Finals, L.A.	Hard (i)	SF	4–6, 6–4, 6–2	10

Preceded by Mary Pierce	WTA Most Improved Player of the Year; 1995	Succeeded by Martina Hingis
