= 1996 Australian Open – Mixed doubles =

Mixed doubles
- 1996 Australian Open

Final
- Champions: (Latvia) Larisa Neiland (Australia) Mark Woodforde
- Runners-up: (United States) Nicole Arendt (United States) Luke Jensen
- Score: 4–6, 7–5, 6–0

Details
- Draw: 32
- Seeds: 8

Events
Singles	men	women		boys	girls
Doubles	men	women	mixed	boys	girls
WC Singles	men	women	quad
WC Doubles	men	women	quad
Legends	men	women	mixed
- Australian Open

Natasha Zvereva and Rick Leach were the defending champions but only Leach competed that year, with Rennae Stubbs.

Stubbs and Leach lost in the first round to Rene Simpson and Daniel Nestor.

Larisa Neiland and Mark Woodforde won in the final 4–6, 7–5, 6–0 against Nicole Arendt and Luke Jensen.

== Seeds ==
Champion seeds are indicated in bold text while text in italics indicates the round in which those seeds were eliminated.

1. (Latvia) **Larisa Neiland** / (Australia) **Mark Woodforde (champions)**
2. (United States) Gigi Fernández / (Czech Republic) Cyril Suk (second round)
3. n/a
4. (United States) Lisa Raymond / (The Bahamas) Mark Knowles (semifinals)
5. (Australia) Rennae Stubbs / (United States) Rick Leach (first round)
6. (Spain) Arantxa Sánchez Vicario / (Spain) Emilio Sánchez (first round)
7. (United States) Mary Joe Fernández / (United States) Alex O'Brien (second round)
8. (Netherlands) Kristie Boogert / (Russia) Andrei Olhovskiy (first round)

== Draw ==
Key

- Q = Qualifier
- WC = Wild card
- LL = Lucky loser
- Alt = Alternate
- ITF = ITF entry
- PR = Protected ranking
- SR = Special ranking
- SE = Special exempt
- JE = Junior exempt
- JR = Junior Accelerator Programme entrant
- CO = College Accelerator Programme entrant
- NG = Next Gen Accelerator Program entrant
- w/o = Walkover
- r = Retired
- d = Defaulted

=== Final ===
Final
1	(Latvia) **Larisa Neiland** (Australia) **Mark Woodforde**	4	**7**	**6**
	(United States) Nicole Arendt (United States) Luke Jensen	**6**	5	0

=== Top half ===
First round
1	(Latvia) **L Neiland** (Australia) **M Woodforde**	**6**	3	**6**
(Netherlands) B Schultz-McCarthy (United States) M Jensen	4	**6**	2
(Netherlands) **M Bollegraf** (United States) **T Kronemann**	**7**	4	**6**
WC	(Australia) N Bradtke (Argentina) J Frana	5	**6**	4
WC	(Australia) E Smylie (Australia) S Draper	**6**	6^{7}	5
(United States) **M McGrath** (United States) **M Lucena**	4	**7^{9}**	**7**
(Canada) **R Simpson** (Canada) **D Nestor**	**7**	**6**
5	(Australia) R Stubbs (United States) R Leach	5	2
4	(United States) **L Raymond** (The Bahamas) **M Knowles**	**6**	4	**8**
(Italy) L Golarsa (Belgium) L Pimek	1	**6**	6
(Netherlands) C Vis (United States) S Melville	5	6^{4}
(United States) **K Po** (United States) **T Ho**	**7**	**7^{7}**
(France) A Dechaume-Balleret (France) G Raoux	4	4
(United States) **L McNeil** (United States) **M Keil**	**6**	**6**
ALT	(France) **J Halard-Decugis** (Australia) **M Tebbutt**	**6**	**6**
8	(Netherlands) K Boogert (Russia) A Olhovskiy	4	4

Second round
1	(Latvia) **L Neiland** (Australia) **M Woodforde**	4	**6**	**8**
(Netherlands) M Bollegraf (United States) T Kronemann	**6**	2	6
(United States) **M McGrath** (United States) **M Lucena**	**6**	4	**6**
(Canada) R Simpson (Canada) D Nestor	3	**6**	2
4	(United States) **L Raymond** (The Bahamas) **M Knowles**	**6**	**6**
(United States) K Po (United States) T Ho	4	2
(United States) L McNeil (United States) M Keil	4	4
ALT	(France) **J Halard-Decugis** (Australia) **M Tebbutt**	**6**	**6**

Quarterfinals
1	(Latvia) **L Neiland** (Australia) **M Woodforde**	2	**6**	**8**
(United States) M McGrath (United States) M Lucena	**6**	3	6
4	(United States) **L Raymond** (The Bahamas) **M Knowles**	**7^{7}**	**6**
ALT	(France) J Halard-Decugis (Australia) M Tebbutt	6^{5}	2

Semifinals
1	(Latvia) **L Neiland** (Australia) **M Woodforde**	3	**6**	**6**
4	(United States) L Raymond (The Bahamas) M Knowles	**6**	3	2

=== Bottom half ===
First round
7	(United States) **M J Fernandez** (United States) **A O'Brien**	**6**	3	**6**
(United States) A Frazier (United States) J Tarango	3	**6**	3
(Argentina) M Paz (Spain) J Sánchez	3	6^{2}
(Romania) **I Spîrlea** (United States) **G Van Emburgh**	**6**	**7^{7}**
ALT	(Japan) N Miyagi (United States) K Kinnear	4	3
(United States) **N Arendt** (United States) **L Jensen**	**6**	**6**
WC	(Australia) **R McQuillan** (Australia) **D Macpherson**	**6**	4	**6**
ALT	(Sweden) M Strandlund (Sweden) P Nyborg	3	**6**	4
6	(Spain) A Sánchez Vicario (Spain) E Sánchez	5	3
(Czech Republic) **H Suková** (South Africa) **E Ferreira**	**7**	**6**
(Belgium) **E Callens** (South Africa) **P Norval**	**6**	6^{3}	**6**
(Australia) K Radford (Netherlands) M Oosting	3	**7^{7}**	2
(Canada) **J Hetherington** (South Africa) **J-L de Jager**	**6**	**6**
(Germany) W Probst (South Africa) D Adams	0	2
(United States) L Wild (United States) J Grabb	**7**	5	2
2	(United States) **G Fernández** (Czech Republic) **C Suk**	5	**7**	**6**

Second round
7	(United States) M J Fernandez (United States) A O'Brien	3	2
(Romania) **I Spîrlea** (United States) **G Van Emburgh**	**6**	**6**
(United States) **N Arendt** (United States) **L Jensen**	3	**7^{8}**	**9**
WC	(Australia) R McQuillan (Australia) D Macpherson	**6**	6^{6}	7
(Czech Republic) **H Suková** (South Africa) **E Ferreira**	4	**7**	**6**
(Belgium) E Callens (South Africa) P Norval	**6**	5	4
(Canada) **J Hetherington** (South Africa) **J-L de Jager**	**6**	**6**
2	(United States) G Fernández (Czech Republic) C Suk	4	2

Quarterfinals
(Romania) I Spîrlea (United States) G Van Emburgh	**6**	1	4
(United States) **N Arendt** (United States) **L Jensen**	3	**6**	**6**
(Czech Republic) H Suková (South Africa) E Ferreira	2	**6**	4
(Canada) **J Hetherington** (South Africa) **J-L de Jager**	**6**	1	**6**

Semifinals
(United States) **N Arendt** (United States) **L Jensen**	**6**	**6**
(Canada) J Hetherington (South Africa) J-L de Jager	2	4
