= Brendan Curry =

South African tennis player

- Country (sports): South Africa
- Born: 21 December 1971 (age 53); Port Elizabeth, South Africa
- Prize money: $19,675

Singles
- Highest ranking: No. 450 (28 October 1991)

Doubles
- Career record: 2–3
- Highest ranking: No. 181 (29 January 1996)

Brendan Curry (born 21 December 1971) is a former professional tennis player from South Africa.

== Biography ==
Born in Port Elizabeth, Curry began competing on tour in 1989. He was most successful in doubles, reaching a highest ranking of 181 in the world and winning two ATP Challenger titles.

His best performance on the ATP Tour came at the 1993 South African Open in Durban, where he teamed up with Kevin Ullyett to make the doubles semi-finals. He also partnered with Ullyett to make the final round of the 1993 Wimbledon qualifying draw, beating the Canadian pair of Sébastien Lareau and Daniel Nestor en route.

In 1994 he made further ATP Tour main draw appearances in the doubles at Sun City and Prague, partnering David Nainkin and Kirk Haygarth respectively.

Since 2015 he has been the Director of Tennis at Tiburon Peninsula Club and serves as the Tournament Director of the Tiburon Challenger.

== Challenger titles ==
=== Doubles: (2) ===
No.	Year	Tournament	Surface	Partner	Opponents	Score
1.	1993	Liège, Belgium	Clay	(South Africa) Kirk Haygarth	(Sweden) Jan Apell (Australia) Paul Kilderry	6–3, 4–6, 6–4
2.	1994	Eisenach, Germany	Clay	(Argentina) Luis Lobo	(Argentina) Marcelo Charpentier (Argentina) Miguel Pastura	5–7, 6–1, 6–3
