= Bill Behrens =

American tennis player

- Country (sports): United States
- Born: June 26, 1970 (age 55) Pasadena, California, United States
- Turned pro: 1993
- Plays: Right-handed
- Prize money: $145,547

Singles
- Career record: 2–4 (at ATP Tour level, Grand Slam level, and in Davis Cup)
- Career titles: 0; 0 Challenger, 0 Futures
- Highest ranking: No. 226 (27 May 1996)

Grand Slam singles results
- Australian Open: Q2 (1998)
- Wimbledon: Q2 (1994, 1996, 1998)
- US Open: Q1 (1996)

Doubles
- Career record: 22–27 (at ATP Tour level, Grand Slam level, and in Davis Cup)
- Career titles: 1; 5 Challenger, 0 Futures
- Highest ranking: No. 72 (10 Jun 1996)

Grand Slam doubles results
- Australian Open: 1R (1996, 1997)
- French Open: 1R (1996)
- Wimbledon: 3R (1997)
- US Open: 2R (1997)
- Last updated on: 4 May 2026.

Bill Behrens (born June 26, 1970) is a former professional tennis player from the United States.

== Biography ==
Behrens, who was born in Pasadena, played for four years at the University of California, Los Angeles before turning professional. He was an NCAA All-American in 1992.

His only title on the ATP World Tour came in the doubles event at St. Pölten in 1992, as an unseeded pairing with Matt Lucena. With the same partner he also finished runner-up in Atlanta in 1996. It was in doubles that he attained his highest ranking, 72 in the world. In singles he made it to 226 in the world and was a finalist in a Challenger tournament in Birmingham, Alabama in 1996, with wins over top 100 players Michael Joyce and Nicolás Lapentti.

Behrens competed in the main draw of the men's doubles events at six Grand Slam tournaments across 1996 and 1997. In the 1997 Wimbledon Championships he had his best result when he reached the third round, with South African Chris Haggard. He and partner Patrick McEnroe had an opening round win over the eighth seeds Pat Galbraith and Ellis Ferreira at the 1997 US Open, before making a second round exit.

He works as a tennis coach in Murrieta, California.

== ATP career finals ==
=== Doubles: 2 (1 win, 1 runner-up) ===
Legend Grand Slam Tournaments (0–0) ATP World Tour Finals (0–0) ATP World Tour Masters Series (0–0) ATP Championship Series (0–0) ATP World Series (1–1)	Finals by surface Hard (0–0) Clay (1–1) Grass (0–0) Carpet (0–0)	Finals by setting Outdoors (1–1) Indoors (0–0)

Result	W–L	Date	Tournament	Tier	Surface	Partner	Opponents	Score
Win	1–0	Jun 1995	St. Polten, Austria	World Series	Clay	(United States) Matt Lucena	(Belgium) Libor Pimek (South Africa) Byron Talbot	7–5, 6–4
Loss	1–1	May 1996	Atlanta, United States	World Series	Clay	(United States) Matt Lucena	(South Africa) Christo Van Rensburg (United States) David Wheaton	6–7, 2–6

== ATP Challenger and ITF Futures finals ==
=== Singles: 1 (0–1) ===
Legend ATP Challenger (0–1) ITF Futures (0–0)	Finals by surface Hard (0–0) Clay (0–1) Grass (0–0) Carpet (0–0)

Result	W–L	Date	Tournament	Tier	Surface	Opponent	Score
Loss	0–1	Apr 1996	Birmingham, United States	Challenger	Clay	(Argentina) Mariano Zabaleta	4–6, 4–6

=== Doubles: 8 (5–3) ===
Legend ATP Challenger (5–3) ITF Futures (0–0)	Finals by surface Hard (2–1) Clay (1–2) Grass (0–0) Carpet (2–0)

Result	W–L	Date	Tournament	Tier	Surface	Partner	Opponents	Score
Win	1–0	Feb 1994	Celle, Germany	Challenger	Carpet	(South Africa) Kirk Haygarth	(Germany) Alexander Mronz (Germany) Arne Thoms	6–4, 4–6, 6–3
Loss	1–1	May 1994	Cali, Colombia	Challenger	Clay	(South Africa) Kirk Haygarth	(Portugal) Joao Cunha-Silva (Czech Republic) Tomas Anzari	6–7, 6–3, 3–6
Win	2–1	Feb 1995	Lippstadt, Germany	Challenger	Carpet	(Germany) Mathias Huning	(United States) Bret Garnett (United States) T. J. Middleton	6–4, 3–6, 7–6
Win	3–1	Feb 1995	Cherbourg, France	Challenger	Hard	(United States) Matt Lucena	(South Africa) Marius Barnard (South Africa) Stefan Kruger	7–6, 6–1
Loss	3–2	Jul 1995	Braunschweig, Germany	Challenger	Clay	(South Africa) Brendan Curry	(Sweden) Nicklas Kulti (Sweden) Mikael Tillstrom	6–7, 4–6
Win	4–2	Jul 1995	Poznan, Poland	Challenger	Clay	(United States) Matt Lucena	(United States) Jeff Belloli (United States) Jack Waite	7–5, 6–1
Win	5–2	Feb 1996	Cherbourg, France	Challenger	Hard	(South Africa) Marius Barnard	(Portugal) Joao Cunha-Silva (Germany) Mathias Huning	6–2, 4–6, 6–3
Loss	5–3	Nov 1996	Puebla, Mexico	Challenger	Hard	(United States) Steve Campbell	(Mexico) Leonardo Lavalle (Venezuela) Maurice Ruah	5–7, 2–6

== Performance timelines ==
Key
W	F	SF	QF	#R	RR	Q#	DNQ	A	NH

(W) winner; (F) finalist; (SF) semifinalist; (QF) quarterfinalist; (#R) rounds 4, 3, 2, 1; (RR) round-robin stage; (Q#) qualification round; (DNQ) did not qualify; (A) absent; (NH) not held; (SR) strike rate (events won / competed); (W–L) win–loss record.

=== Doubles ===
Tournament	1994	1995	1996	1997	SR	W–L	Win %
Grand Slam tournaments
Australian Open	A	A	1R	1R	0 / 2	0–2	0%
French Open	A	A	1R	A	0 / 1	0–1	0%
Wimbledon	Q1	A	1R	3R	0 / 2	2–2	50%
US Open	A	A	Q1	2R	0 / 1	1–1	50%
Win–loss	0–0	0–0	0–3	3–3	0 / 6	3–6	33%
