= Matt Lucena =

American tennis player

- Country (sports): United States
- Born: August 4, 1969 (age 56) Chico, California, U.S.
- Height: 5 ft 10 in (1.78 m)
- Turned pro: 1992
- Plays: Right-handed
- Prize money: $170,523

Singles
- Career record: 0–1 (at ATP Tour level, Grand Slam level, and in Davis Cup)
- Career titles: 0; 0 Challenger, 0 Futures
- Highest ranking: No. 312 (11 Oct 1993)

Grand Slam singles results
- Wimbledon: Q2 (1994)
- US Open: Q1 (1993)

Doubles
- Career record: 36–48 (at ATP Tour level, Grand Slam level, and in Davis Cup)
- Career titles: 1; 4 Challenger, 0 Futures
- Highest ranking: No. 62 (6 May 1996)

Grand Slam doubles results
- Australian Open: 1R (1996)
- French Open: 1R (1995, 1996)
- Wimbledon: 2R (1995)
- US Open: QF (1991, 1993)

Mixed doubles
- Career titles: 1

Grand Slam mixed doubles results
- Australian Open: QF (1996)
- French Open: 3R (1996)
- Wimbledon: 2R (1996)
- US Open: W (1995)
- Last updated on: 5 May 2026.

Matt Lucena (born August 4, 1969) is a former professional tennis player from the United States. He won the mixed doubles title at the 1995 US Open.

== College years ==
Lucena played tennis for UC Berkeley from 1988 to 1992. He and Doug Eisenman were NCAA doubles champions in 1990 and with a new partner, Bent-Ove Pedersen in 1991, Lucena went back to back. A three-time All-American, he didn't drop a set in either year.

== Professional career ==
The highlight of Lucena's professional career was winning the 1995 US Open mixed doubles title, partnering Meredith McGrath. Unseeded, the pair had never played together previously. He twice made the quarter-finals of the men's doubles at the US Open, in 1991 with his UC Berkeley teammate Pedersen and in 1993 with Brian MacPhie. He won one ATP Tour doubles title, at St. Poelten in 1995, as well as four ATP Challenger titles.

== Grand Slam finals ==
=== Mixed doubles: 1 (1–0) ===
Result	Year	Championship	Partner	Opponents	Score
Win	1995	U.S. Open	(United States) Meredith McGrath	(Czech Republic) Cyril Suk (United States) Gigi Fernández	6–4, 6–4

== ATP career finals ==
=== Doubles: 2 (1 win, 1 runner-up) ===
Legend Grand Slam Tournaments (0–0) ATP World Tour Finals (0–0) ATP World Tour Masters Series (0–0) ATP Championship Series (0–0) ATP World Series (1–1)	Finals by surface Hard (0–0) Clay (1–1) Grass (0–0) Carpet (0–0)	Finals by setting Outdoors (1–1) Indoors (0–0)

Result	W–L	Date	Tournament	Tier	Surface	Partner	Opponents	Score
Win	1–0	Jun 1995	St. Polten, Austria	World Series	Clay	(United States) Bill Behrens	(Belgium) Libor Pimek (South Africa) Byron Talbot	7–5, 6–4
Loss	1–1	May 1996	Atlanta, United States	World Series	Clay	(United States) Bill Behrens	(South Africa) Christo Van Rensburg (United States) David Wheaton	6–7, 2–6

== ATP Challenger and ITF Futures finals ==
=== Doubles: 8 (4–4) ===
Legend ATP Challenger (4–4) ITF Futures (0–0)	Finals by surface Hard (2–1) Clay (2–3) Grass (0–0) Carpet (0–0)

Result	W–L	Date	Tournament	Tier	Surface	Partner	Opponents	Score
Win	1–0	Sep 1991	Bloomfield Hills, United States	Challenger	Hard	(United States) Steve Devries	(United States) Doug Eisenman (United States) Ted Scherman	6–4, 6–3
Loss	1–1	Sep 1993	Fairfield, United States	Challenger	Hard	(United States) Brian Macphie	(United States) Alex O'Brien (United States) Jared Palmer	3–6, 5–7
Loss	1–2	Oct 1994	Guayaquil, Ecuador	Challenger	Clay	(United States) Richard Schmidt	(Portugal) Joao Cunha-Silva (Portugal) Nuno Marques	6–7, 4–6
Win	2–2	Feb 1995	Cherbourg, France	Challenger	Hard	(United States) Bill Behrens	(South Africa) Marius Barnard (South Africa) Stefan Kruger	7–6, 6–1
Win	3–2	May 1995	Dresden, Germany	Challenger	Clay	(Portugal) Nuno Marques	(United States) Mike Bauer (Australia) Jon Ireland	6–1, 6–4
Loss	3–3	May 1995	Budapest, Hungary	Challenger	Clay	(Sweden) Rikard Bergh	(Argentina) Pablo Albano (Netherlands) Hendrik-Jan Davids	4–6, 4–6
Win	4–3	Jul 1995	Poznan, Poland	Challenger	Clay	(United States) Bill Behrens	(United States) Jeff Belloli (United States) Jack Waite	7–5, 6–1
Loss	4–4	Apr 1996	Birmingham, United States	Challenger	Clay	(United States) Dave Randall	(Argentina) Javier Frana (Czech Republic) Karel Novacek	3–6, 1–6

== Performance timelines ==
Key
W	F	SF	QF	#R	RR	Q#	DNQ	A	NH

(W) winner; (F) finalist; (SF) semifinalist; (QF) quarterfinalist; (#R) rounds 4, 3, 2, 1; (RR) round-robin stage; (Q#) qualification round; (DNQ) did not qualify; (A) absent; (NH) not held; (SR) strike rate (events won / competed); (W–L) win–loss record.

=== Doubles ===
Tournament	1989	1990	1991	1992	1993	1994	1995	1996	SR	W–L	Win %
Grand Slam tournaments
Australian Open	A	A	A	A	A	A	A	1R	0 / 1	0–1	0%
French Open	A	A	A	A	A	A	1R	1R	0 / 2	0–2	–
Wimbledon	A	A	A	Q2	A	Q1	2R	1R	0 / 2	1–2	33%
US Open	A	1R	QF	1R	QF	3R	1R	3R	0 / 7	10–7	59%
Win–loss	0–0	0–1	3–1	0–1	3–1	2–1	1–3	2–4	0 / 12	11–12	48%
ATP Masters Series
Indian Wells	1R	A	A	A	A	A	A	A	0 / 1	0–1	0%
Miami	A	A	A	A	A	A	A	1R	0 / 1	0–1	0%
Stuttgart	A	A	A	A	A	A	2R	A	0 / 1	1–1	50%
Win–loss	0–1	0–0	0–0	0–0	0–0	0–0	1–1	0–1	0 / 3	1–3	25%

=== Mixed Doubles ===
Tournament	1995	1996	SR	W–L	Win %
Grand Slam tournaments
Australian Open	A	QF	0 / 1	3–1	75%
French Open	A	3R	0 / 1	2–1	67%
Wimbledon	1R	2R	0 / 2	1–2	33%
US Open	W	1R	1 / 2	5–1	83%
Win–loss	5–1	6–4	1 / 6	11–5	69%
