= 1994 ATP St. Pölten =

- Date: 13–20 June
- Edition: 14th
- Category: ATP World Series
- Draw: 32S / 16D
- Prize money: $300,000
- Surface: Clay / outdoor
- Location: Sankt Pölten, Austria

Champions

Singles
- (Austria) Thomas Muster

Doubles
- (Czech Republic) Vojtěch Flégl / (Australia) Andrew Florent
- ATP St. Pölten

The 1994 Hypo Group Tennis International was an ATP men's tennis tournament held on outdoor clay courts in St. Poelten, Austria that was part of the World Series of the 1994 ATP Tour. It was the 14th edition of the tournament and was held from 13 June until 20 June 1994. First-seeded Thomas Muster won the singles title, his third win at the event after 1988 and 1993.

== Finals ==
=== Singles ===
(Austria) Thomas Muster defeated (Spain) Tomás Carbonell 4–6, 6–2, 6–4

- It was Muster's 3rd singles title of the year and the 23rd of his career.

=== Doubles ===
(Czech Republic) Vojtěch Flégl / (Australia) Andrew Florent defeated (Malaysia) Adam Malik / (United States) Jeff Tarango 3–6, 6–1, 6–4
