= Byron Talbot =

South African tennis player

- Country (sports): South Africa
- Born: 15 September 1964 (age 62) Johannesburg, South Africa
- Height: 1.83 m (6 ft 0 in)
- Turned pro: 1988
- Plays: Right-handed
- Prize money: $861,245

Singles
- Career record: 1–5
- Career titles: 0
- Highest ranking: No. 229 (3 April 1989)

Grand Slam singles results
- Australian Open: 1R (1989)

Doubles
- Career record: 183–237
- Career titles: 7
- Highest ranking: No. 20 (29 July 1996)

Grand Slam doubles results
- Australian Open: 3R (1995)
- French Open: QF (1996)
- Wimbledon: SF (1993)
- US Open: 2R (1995, 1996)

Byron Talbot (born 15 September 1964) is a former professional tennis player from South Africa. He enjoyed most of his tennis success while playing doubles. During his career, he won seven doubles titles and finished as a runner-up six times. He achieved a career-high doubles world ranking of number 20 in 1996.

Byron played collegiate tennis at the University of Tennessee. He is currently working as a financial advisor for Merrill Lynch in Dallas, Texas.

== Career finals ==
=== Doubles: 13 (7 wins / 6 losses) ===
Legend
Grand Slam tournaments (0)
Tennis Masters Cup (0)
ATP Masters Series (0)
ATP Championship Series (2)
ATP Tour (5)

Result	W/L	Date	Tournament	Surface	Partner	Opponents	Score
Loss	0–1	Jul 1989	Schenectady, U.S.	Hard	(United States) Brad Pearce	(United States) Scott Davis (Australia) Broderick Dyke	6–2, 4–6, 4–6
Loss	0–2	Apr 1992	Hong Kong	Hard	(Zimbabwe) Byron Black	(United States) Brad Gilbert (United States) Jim Grabb	2–6, 1–6
Win	1–2	Jul 1992	Stuttgart Outdoor, Germany	Clay	(United States) Glenn Layendecker	(Spain) Javier Sánchez (Switzerland) Marc Rosset	4–6, 6–3, 6–4
Win	2–2	Oct 1992	Toulouse, France	Hard (i)	(United States) Brad Pearce	(France) Guy Forget (France) Henri Leconte	6–1, 3–6, 6–3
Loss	2–3	Jan 1994	Doha, Qatar	Hard	(United States) Shelby Cannon	(France) Olivier Delaître (France) Stephane Simian	3–6, 3–6
Loss	2–4	Jun 1995	St. Poelten, Austria	Clay	(Belgium) Libor Pimek	(United States) Bill Behrens (United States) Matt Lucena	5–7, 4–6
Win	3–4	Jul 1995	Prague, Czech Republic	Clay	(Belgium) Libor Pimek	(Czech Republic) Jiří Novák (Czech Republic) David Rikl	7–5, 1–6, 7–6
Win	4–4	Mar 1996	Copenhagen, Denmark	Carpet	(Belgium) Libor Pimek	(Australia) Wayne Arthurs (Australia) Andrew Kratzmann	7–6, 3–6, 6–3
Loss	4–5	May 1996	Rome, Italy	Clay	(Belgium) Libor Pimek	(Zimbabwe) Byron Black (Canada) Grant Connell	2–6, 3–6
Win	5–5	Jul 1996	Stuttgart Outdoor, Germany	Clay	(Belgium) Libor Pimek	(Spain) Tomás Carbonell (Spain) Francisco Roig	6–2, 5–7, 6–4
Win	6–5	Jul 1996	Kitzbühel, Austria	Clay	(Belgium) Libor Pimek	(South Africa) David Adams (Netherlands) Menno Oosting	7–6, 6–3
Loss	6–6	Mar 1997	Rotterdam, Netherlands	Carpet	(Belgium) Libor Pimek	(Netherlands) Jacco Eltingh (Netherlands) Paul Haarhuis	6–7, 4–6
Win	7–6	Jun 1998	Nottingham, U.K.	Grass	(United States) Justin Gimelstob	(Canada) Sébastien Lareau (Canada) Daniel Nestor	7–5, 6–7, 6–4
