= Ctislav Doseděl =

Czech tennis coach and former tennis player

- Country (sports): Czech Republic
- Residence: Monte Carlo, Monaco
- Born: 14 August 1970 (age 55) Přerov, Czechoslovakia
- Height: 1.82 m (6 ft 0 in)
- Turned pro: 1989
- Retired: 2001
- Plays: Right-handed (two-handed backhand)
- Prize money: $2,452,512

Singles
- Career record: 196–193
- Career titles: 3
- Highest ranking: No. 26 (10 October 1994)

Grand Slam singles results
- Australian Open: 4R (2000)
- French Open: 4R (1993)
- Wimbledon: 2R (1994, 1995, 2000, 2001)
- US Open: QF (1999)

Other tournaments
- Olympic Games: 1R (2000)

Doubles
- Career record: 35–52
- Career titles: 1
- Highest ranking: No. 120 (10 March 1997)

Grand Slam doubles results
- Australian Open: 2R (1998)
- French Open: 1R (1998)
- Wimbledon: 2R (1997)
- US Open: Q1 (1998)
- Last updated on: 28 June 2021.

Ctislav "Sláva" Doseděl (Czech pronunciation: [ˈtscɪslaf ˈslaːva ˈdosɛɟɛl]; born 10 August 1970) is a Czech former tennis player. He turned professional in 1989.

== Career ==
Doseděl won three singles titles and one doubles titles during his career. The right-hander reached the quarter-finals of the 1999 US Open by defeating Jim Courier, Fernando Meligeni, Fredrik Jonsson and Jiří Novák before losing to Todd Martin. He also got to the semifinals of the 1994 Rome Masters and achieved his career-high ATP singles ranking of World No. 26 in October 1994. His tennis career ended with the 2001 US Open.

Doseděl is still involved in professional tennis post retirement and is, as of June 2012, coaching top 100 singles player Lukáš Rosol and most recently top 250 player Jonáš Forejtek of the Czech Republic.

== Personal life ==
Doseděl appeared in a 1999 Czech movie titled "Life Water" (Voda života), telling the life of Vincent Priessnitz who found cure for high fever during the 19th century.

== ATP career finals ==
=== Singles: 6 (3 titles, 3 runner-ups) ===
Legend (doubles) Grand Slam (0–0) ATP World Tour Finals (0–0) ATP Masters Series (0–0) ATP Championship Series (0–0) ATP World Series (3–3)	Finals by surface Hard (0–0) Clay (3–3) Grass (0–0) Carpet (0–0)	Finals by setting Outdoor (3–3) Indoor (0–0)

Result	W–L	Date	Tournament	Tier	Surface	Opponent	Score
Loss	0–1	Nov 1993	São Paulo, Brazil	World Series	Clay	(Spain) Alberto Berasategui	4–6, 3–6
Win	1–1	Oct 1995	Santiago, Chile	World Series	Clay	(Chile) Marcelo Ríos	7–6^{(7–3)}, 6–3
Win	2–1	May 1996	Munich, Germany	World Series	Clay	(Spain) Carlos Moyá	6–4, 4–6, 6–3
Win	3–1	Aug 1997	Amsterdam, Netherlands	World Series	Clay	(Spain) Carlos Moyá	7–6^{(7–4)}, 7–6^{(7–5)}, 6–7^{(4–7)}, 6–2
Loss	3–2	Apr 1998	Prague, Czech Republic	World Series	Clay	(Brazil) Fernando Meligeni	1–6, 4–6
Loss	3–3	Apr 1999	Prague, Czech Republic	World Series	Clay	(Slovakia) Dominik Hrbatý	2–6, 2–6

=== Doubles: 1 (1 title) ===
Legend (doubles) Grand Slam (0–0) ATP World Tour Finals (0–0) ATP Masters Series (0–0) ATP Championship Series (0–0) ATP World Series (1–0)	Finals by surface Hard (0–0) Clay (1–0) Grass (0–0) Carpet (0–0)	Finals by setting Outdoor (1–0) Indoor (0–0)

Result	W–L	Date	Tournament	Tier	Surface	Partner	Opponents	Score
Win	1–0	May 1996	St Pölten, Austria	World Series	Clay	(Czech Republic) Pavel Vízner	(South Africa) David Adams (Netherlands) Menno Oosting	6–7, 6–4, 6–3

== ATP Challenger and ITF Futures finals ==
=== Singles: 12 (5–7) ===
Legend ATP Challenger (5–7) ITF Futures (0–0)	Finals by surface Hard (2–2) Clay (3–4) Grass (0–0) Carpet (0–1)

Result	W–L	Date	Tournament	Tier	Surface	Opponent	Score
Loss	0–1	May 1990	Kuala Lumpur, Malaysia	Challenger	Hard	(Nigeria) Nduka Odizor	3–6, 6–3, 3–6
Win	1–1	May 1990	Bangkok, Thailand	Challenger	Hard	(Germany) Patrick Baur	6–3, 6–4
Loss	1–2	Oct 1990	Casablanca, Morocco	Challenger	Clay	(Netherlands) Richard Krajicek	6–7, 3–6
Win	2–2	Aug 1992	Poznań, Poland	Challenger	Clay	(Czech Republic) Daniel Vacek	6–4, 3–6, 7–6
Loss	2–3	Jul 1993	Oberstaufen, Germany	Challenger	Clay	(Hungary) Milen Velev	3–6, 6–7
Loss	2–4	Dec 1993	Paget, Bermuda	Challenger	Clay	(Sweden) Mikael Pernfors	4–6, 3–6
Loss	2–5	Mar 1994	Garmisch, Germany	Challenger	Carpet	(Slovakia) Karol Kučera	3–6, 2–6
Loss	2–6	Mar 1997	Indian Wells, United States	Challenger	Hard	(Czech Republic) Jiří Novák	6–7, 4–6
Win	3–6	Jul 1998	Merano, Italy	Challenger	Clay	(Norway) Christian Ruud	7–6, 7–6
Loss	3–7	Jul 1999	Venice, Italy	Challenger	Clay	(Romania) Andrei Pavel	2–6, 0–6
Win	4–7	Oct 1999	Tel Aviv, Israel	Challenger	Hard	(Israel) Noam Okun	7–6, 6–3
Win	5–7	May 2001	Prague, Czech Republic	Challenger	Clay	(Czech Republic) Jan Hernych	6–2, 4–6, 6–1

=== Doubles: 5 (3–2) ===
Legend ATP Challenger (3–2) ITF Futures (0–0)	Finals by surface Hard (0–0) Clay (3–2) Grass (0–0) Carpet (0–0)

Result	W–L	Date	Tournament	Tier	Surface	Partner	Opponents	Score
Loss	0–1	Aug 1989	Geneva, Switzerland	Challenger	Clay	(France) Arnaud Boetsch	(Germany) Peter Ballauff (Italy) Ugo Pigato	4–6, 3–6
Win	1–1	Sep 1990	Verona, Italy	Challenger	Clay	(Ukraine) Dimitri Poliakov	(Netherlands) Jacco Eltingh (France) Menno Oosting	6–0, 6–7, 6–4
Loss	1–2	Oct 1990	Casablanca, Morocco	Challenger	Clay	(Netherlands) Richard Krajicek	(Spain) Juan-Carlos Baguena (Spain) Francisco Roig	4–6, 7–5, 5–7
Win	2–2	Jul 1993	Oberstaufen, Germany	Challenger	Clay	(Czech Republic) Radomír Vašek	(Germany) Christian Geyer (Germany) Mathias Huning	6–2, 6–2
Win	3–2	Mar 1994	Agadir, Morocco	Challenger	Clay	(Netherlands) Mark Koevermans	(Germany) Bernd Karbacher (Sweden) Tomas Nydahl	6–7, 6–3, 7–6

== Performance timelines ==
Key
W	F	SF	QF	#R	RR	Q#	DNQ	A	NH

(W) winner; (F) finalist; (SF) semifinalist; (QF) quarterfinalist; (#R) rounds 4, 3, 2, 1; (RR) round-robin stage; (Q#) qualification round; (DNQ) did not qualify; (A) absent; (NH) not held; (SR) strike rate (events won / competed); (W–L) win–loss record.

=== Singles ===
Tournament	1991	1992	1993	1994	1995	1996	1997	1998	1999	2000	2001	SR	W–L	Win%
Grand Slam tournaments
Australian Open	2R	A	Q1	A	A	A	2R	2R	2R	4R	2R	0 / 6	8–6	57%
French Open	2R	A	4R	2R	2R	2R	1R	1R	A	2R	1R	0 / 9	8–9	47%
Wimbledon	A	A	1R	2R	2R	A	1R	1R	1R	2R	2R	0 / 8	4–8	33%
US Open	A	1R	1R	A	A	A	1R	2R	QF	2R	1R	0 / 7	6–7	46%
Win–loss	2–2	0–1	3–3	2–2	2–2	1–1	1–4	2–4	5–3	6–4	2–4	0 / 30	26–30	46%
ATP Tour Masters 1000
Indian Wells	A	A	A	A	A	A	3R	2R	Q1	2R	A	0 / 3	4–3	57%
Miami	A	A	A	A	A	A	3R	2R	2R	1R	A	0 / 4	4–4	0%
Monte Carlo	A	A	A	3R	1R	Q2	2R	3R	1R	3R	Q1	0 / 6	7–6	54%
Hamburg	A	A	A	2R	3R	3R	3R	2R	2R	1R	A	0 / 7	9–7	56%
Rome Masters	A	A	A	SF	2R	A	A	A	A	1R	A	0 / 3	5–3	63%
Canada Masters	1R	A	A	A	A	A	A	A	A	1R	A	0 / 2	0–2	0%
Cincinnati Masters	A	A	A	A	A	A	A	A	A	3R	A	0 / 1	2–1	67%
Win–loss	0–1	0–0	0–0	7–3	3–3	2–1	7–4	5–4	2–3	5–7	0–0	0 / 26	31–26	54%

=== Doubles ===
Tournament	1993	1994	1995	1996	1997	1998	1999	2000	SR	W–L	Win%
Grand Slam tournaments
Australian Open	A	A	A	A	1R	2R	1R	A	0 / 3	1–3	25%
French Open	A	A	A	A	A	1R	A	A	0 / 1	0–1	0%
Wimbledon	Q2	A	A	A	2R	1R	A	A	0 / 2	1–2	33%
US Open	A	A	A	A	A	Q1	A	A	0 / 0	0–0	–
Win–loss	0–0	0–0	0–0	0–0	1–2	1–3	0–1	0–0	0 / 6	2–6	25%
ATP Tour Masters 1000
Indian Wells	A	A	A	A	A	Q1	A	A	0 / 0	0–0	–
Miami	A	A	A	A	2R	Q1	A	A	0 / 1	1–1	50%
Monte Carlo	A	A	A	A	Q1	SF	Q2	A	0 / 1	3–1	75%
Hamburg	A	Q1	A	A	1R	A	A	A	0 / 1	0–1	0%
Rome Masters	A	1R	A	A	A	A	A	A	0 / 1	0–1	0%
Stuttgart	A	A	A	A	2R	A	1R	1R	0 / 3	1–3	25%
Win–loss	0–0	0–1	0–0	0–0	2–3	3–1	0–1	0–1	0 / 7	5–7	42%
