= Hypo Group Tennis International =

Tournament information
- Founded: 1981
- Abolished: 2008
- Editions: 28
- Location: Pörtschach; Austria
- Venue: Werzer Arena
- Category: ATP World Series (1990–1999); ATP International Series (2000–2008)
- Surface: Clay / outdoors
- Draw: 32S / 16D
- Prize money: €450,000

The Hypo Group Tennis International was an annual men's tennis tournament which was held between 1981 and 2008. During its lifetime it was organized in four locations in Italy and Austria. The event was part of the ATP Tour's World Series from 1990 to 1999 and of the ATP International Series from 2000 until the final edition in 2008. The tournament had been played on clay courts since its inaugural edition.

== Past finals ==
=== Singles ===
Location	Year	Champion	Runner-up	Score
Bari, Italy	1981	(Hungary) Zoltán Kuhárszky	(Italy) Paolo Bertolucci	6–4, 6–0
Bari, Italy	1982	(Australia) Paul McNamee	(Hungary) Balázs Taróczy	6–2, 6–2
Bari, Italy	1983	(Italy) Corrado Barazzutti	(Argentina) Carlos Castellán	6–0, 6–1
Bari, Italy	1984	(Sweden) Henrik Sundström	(Chile) Pedro Rebolledo	7–5, 6–4
Bari, Italy	1985	(Italy) Claudio Panatta	(United States) Lawson Duncan	6–2, 1–6, 7–6
Bari, Italy	1986	(Sweden) Kent Carlsson	(Argentina) Horacio de la Peña	7–5, 6–7, 7–5
Bari, Italy	1987	(Italy) Claudio Pistolesi	(Italy) Francesco Cancellotti	6–7, 7–5, 6–3
Bari, Italy	1988	(Austria) Thomas Muster	(Uruguay) Marcelo Filippini	2–6, 6–1, 7–5
Bari, Italy	1989	(Spain) Juan Aguilera	(Czechoslovakia) Marián Vajda	4–6, 6–3, 6–4
Genoa, Italy	1990	(Haiti) Ronald Agénor	(France) Tarik Benhabiles	3–6, 6–4, 6–3
Genoa, Italy	1991	(Germany) Carl-Uwe Steeb	(Spain) Jordi Arrese	6–3, 6–4
Genoa, Italy	1992	(Ukraine) Andrei Medvedev	(Argentina) Guillermo Pérez Roldán	6–3, 6–4
Genoa, Italy	1993	(Austria) Thomas Muster	(Sweden) Magnus Gustafsson	7–6, 6–4
St. Pölten, Austria	1994	(Austria) Thomas Muster	(Spain) Tomás Carbonell	4–6, 6–2, 6–4
St. Pölten, Austria	1995	(Austria) Thomas Muster	(Czech Republic) Bohdan Ulihrach	6–3, 3–6, 6–1
St. Pölten, Austria	1996	(Chile) Marcelo Ríos	(Spain) Félix Mantilla	6–2, 6–4
St. Pölten, Austria	1997	(Uruguay) Marcelo Filippini	(Australia) Patrick Rafter	7–6, 6–2
St. Pölten, Austria	1998	(Chile) Marcelo Ríos	(United States) Vincent Spadea	6–2, 6–0
St. Pölten, Austria	1999	(Chile) Marcelo Ríos	(Argentina) Mariano Zabaleta	4–4 ret.
St. Pölten, Austria	2000	(Romania) Andrei Pavel	(Australia) Andrew Ilie	7–5, 3–6, 6–2
St. Pölten, Austria	2001	(Italy) Andrea Gaudenzi	(Austria) Markus Hipfl	6–0, 7–5
St. Pölten, Austria	2002	(Ecuador) Nicolás Lapentti	(Spain) Fernando Vicente	7–5, 6–4
St. Pölten, Austria	2003	(United States) Andy Roddick	(Russia) Nikolay Davydenko	6–3, 6–2
St. Pölten, Austria	2004	(Italy) Filippo Volandri	(Belgium) Xavier Malisse	6–1, 6–4
St. Pölten, Austria	2005	(Russia) Nikolay Davydenko	(Austria) Jürgen Melzer	6–3, 2–6, 6–4
Pörtschach, Austria	2006	(Russia) Nikolay Davydenko	(Romania) Andrei Pavel	6–0, 6–3
Pörtschach, Austria	2007	(Argentina) Juan Mónaco	(France) Gaël Monfils	7–6^{(7–3)}, 6–0
Pörtschach, Austria	2008	(Russia) Nikolay Davydenko	(Argentina) Juan Mónaco	6–2, 2–6, 6–2

=== Doubles ===
Location	Year	Champions	Runners-up	Score
Bari, Italy	1984	(Czech Republic) Stanislav Birner (Czech Republic) Libor Pimek	(United States) Marcel Freeman (United States) Tim Wilkison	2–6, 7–6, 6–4
Bari, Italy	1985	(Argentina) Alejandro Ganzábal (Italy) Claudio Panatta	(United States) Marcel Freeman (Australia) Laurie Warder	6–4, 6–2
Bari, Italy	1986	(United States) Gary Donnelly (Czech Republic) Tomáš Šmíd	(Spain) Sergio Casal (Spain) Emilio Sánchez	2–6, 6–4, 6–4
Bari, Italy	1987	(Sweden) Christer Allgårdh (Sweden) Ulf Stenlund	(Argentina) Roberto Azar (Argentina) Marcelo Ingaramo	2–6, 7–5, 7–5
Bari, Italy	1988	(Austria) Thomas Muster (Italy) Claudio Panatta	(Italy) Francesco Cancellotti (Italy) Simone Colombo	6–3, 6–1
Bari, Italy	1989	(Italy) Simone Colombo (Switzerland) Claudio Mezzadri	(Spain) Sergio Casal (Spain) Javier Sánchez	0–6, 6–3, 6–3
Genoa, Italy	1990	(Spain) Tomás Carbonell (Germany) Udo Riglewski	(Italy) Cristiano Caratti (Italy) Federico Mordegan	7–6, 7–6
Genoa, Italy	1991	(Spain) Marcos Aurelio Gorriz (Venezuela) Alfonso Mora	(Italy) Massimo Ardinghi (Italy) Massimo Boscatto	5–7, 7–5, 6–3
Genoa, Italy	1992	(United States) Shelby Cannon (United States) Greg Van Emburgh	(Netherlands) Paul Haarhuis (Netherlands) Mark Koevermans	6–1, 6–1
Genoa, Italy	1993	(Spain) Sergio Casal (Spain) Emilio Sánchez	(Netherlands) Mark Koevermans (United States) Greg Van Emburgh	6–3, 7–6
St. Pölten, Austria	1994	(Czech Republic) Vojtěch Flégl (Australia) Andrew Florent	(Malaysia) Adam Malik (United States) Jeff Tarango	3–6, 6–1, 6–4
St. Pölten, Austria	1995	(United States) Bill Behrens (United States) Matt Lucena	(Belgium) Libor Pimek (South Africa) Byron Talbot	7–5, 6–4
St. Pölten, Austria	1996	(Czech Republic) Ctislav Doseděl (Czech Republic) Pavel Vízner	(South Africa) David Adams (Netherlands) Menno Oosting	6–7, 6–4, 6–3
St. Pölten, Austria	1997	(United States) Kelly Jones (United States) Scott Melville	(United States) Luke Jensen (United States) Murphy Jensen	6–2, 7–6
St. Pölten, Austria	1998	(United States) Jim Grabb (Australia) David Macpherson	(South Africa) David Adams (Zimbabwe) Wayne Black	6–4, 6–4
St. Pölten, Austria	1999	(Australia) Andrew Florent (Russia) Andrei Olhovskiy	(South Africa) Brent Haygarth (South Africa) Robbie Koenig	5–7, 6–4, 7–5
St. Pölten, Austria	2000	(India) Mahesh Bhupathi (Australia) Andrew Kratzmann	(Italy) Andrea Gaudenzi (Italy) Diego Nargiso	7–6, 6–7, 6–4
St. Pölten, Austria	2001	(Czech Republic) Petr Pála (Czech Republic) David Rikl	(Brazil) Jaime Oncins (Argentina) Daniel Orsanic	6–3, 5–7, 7–5
St. Pölten, Austria	2002	(Czech Republic) Petr Pála (Czech Republic) David Rikl	(United States) Mike Bryan (Australia) Michael Hill	7–5, 6–4
St. Pölten, Austria	2003	(Sweden) Simon Aspelin (Italy) Massimo Bertolini	(Armenia) Sargis Sargsian (Socialist Federal Republic of Yugoslavia) Nenad Zimonjić	6–4, 6–7, 6–3
St. Pölten, Austria	2004	(Argentina) Mariano Hood (Czech Republic) Petr Pála	(Czech Republic) Tomáš Cibulec (Czech Republic) Leoš Friedl	3–6, 7–5, 6–4
St. Pölten, Austria	2005	(Argentina) Lucas Arnold Ker (Australia) Paul Hanley	(Czech Republic) Martin Damm (Argentina) Mariano Hood	6–3, 6–4
Pörtschach, Austria	2006	(Australia) Paul Hanley (United States) Jim Thomas	(Austria) Oliver Marach (Czech Republic) Cyril Suk	6–3, 4–6, [10–5]
Pörtschach, Austria	2007	(Sweden) Simon Aspelin (Austria) Julian Knowle	(Czech Republic) Leoš Friedl (Czech Republic) David Škoch	7–6, 5–7, [10–5]
Pörtschach, Austria	2008	(Brazil) Marcelo Melo (Brazil) André Sá	(Austria) Julian Knowle (Austria) Jürgen Melzer	7–5, 6–7, [13–11]
