= 1995 Romanian Open – Singles =

Singles
- 1995 Romanian Open

Final
- Champion: (Austria) Thomas Muster
- Runner-up: (Austria) Gilbert Schaller
- Score: 6–3, 6–4

Details
- Draw: 32 (3WC/4Q)
- Seeds: 8

Events
Singles	Doubles
← 1994 ·	Romanian Open	· 1996 →

Franco Davín was the defending champion but was eliminated in the qualifying rounds, losing to George Cosac at the second round.

Thomas Muster won the title by defeating his compatriot Gilbert Schaller 6–3, 6–4 in the final.

Muster won his 11th title in this season, after also winning at Mexico City, Estoril, Barcelona, Monte Carlo, Rome, Paris, Sankt Pölten, Stuttgart, San Marino and Umag. With the win, he broke the previous record of 10 titles settled by Pete Sampras during the 1994 season.

== Seeds ==
1. (Austria) Thomas Muster (champion)
2. (Germany) Michael Stich (first round)
3. (Spain) Sergi Bruguera (quarterfinals)
4. (Italy) Andrea Gaudenzi (quarterfinals)
5. (Spain) Albert Costa (second round, retired)
6. (Austria) Gilbert Schaller (final)
7. (France) Arnaud Boetsch (quarterfinals)
8. (Spain) Carlos Costa (first round, retired)

== Draw ==
=== Key ===
- Q = Qualifier
- WC = Wild card
- LL = Lucky loser
- Alt = Alternate
- ITF = ITF entry
- PR = Protected ranking
- SR = Special ranking
- SE = Special exempt
- JE = Junior exempt
- JR = Junior Accelerator Programme entrant
- CO = College Accelerator Programme entrant
- NG = Next Gen Accelerator Program entrant
- w/o = Walkover
- r = Retired
- d = Defaulted

=== Finals ===
Semifinals
1	(Austria) Thomas Muster	6	6
Q	(Hungary) Sándor Noszály	2	2
6	(Austria) Gilbert Schaller	6	7^{7}
(Norway) Christian Ruud	3	6^{5}

Final
1	(Austria) Thomas Muster	6	6
6	(Austria) Gilbert Schaller	3	4

=== Top half ===
First round
1	(Austria) T Muster	6	6
(Spain) T Carbonell	4	4
(Czech Republic) S Doseděl	0	0
(France) C Pioline	6	6
(Italy) R Furlan	6	6
Q	(Spain) P Imaz	4	0
(Australia) P Rafter	4	4
7	(France) A Boetsch	6	6
3	(Spain) S Bruguera	7^{7}	6
Q	(Romania) G Cosac	6^{3}	2
(Romania) A Voinea	6	6
(France) F Santoro	3	2
Q	(Hungary) S Noszály	6	6
WC	(Romania) D Pescariu	2	1
(Spain) J Sánchez	6	4	3
5	(Spain) A Costa	2	6	6

Second round
1	(Austria) T Muster	7	6
(France) C Pioline	5	3
(Italy) R Furlan	2	2
7	(France) A Boetsch	6	6
3	(Spain) S Bruguera	6	6
(Romania) A Voinea	1	2
Q	(Hungary) S Noszály	6	3
5	(Spain) A Costa	4	0^{r}

Quarterfinals
1	(Austria) T Muster	6	6
7	(France) A Boetsch	4	4
3	(Spain) S Bruguera	4	2
Q	(Hungary) S Noszály	6	6

Semifinals
1	(Austria) T Muster	6	6
Q	(Hungary) S Noszály	2	2

=== Bottom half ===
First round
6	(Austria) G Schaller	6	7^{7}
(Germany) MK Goellner	3	6^{5}
(Czech Republic) B Ulihrach	6	6
(France) G Forget	4	3
Q	(Romania) R Farcas	5	3
WC	(Australia) A Ilie	7	6
(Czech Republic) D Vacek	6^{6}	4
4	(Italy) A Gaudenzi	7^{8}	6
8	(Spain) C Costa	5	r
(Spain) F Clavet	7
(Spain) J Arrese	6	6
WC	(Australia) M Philippoussis	2	2
(Norway) C Ruud	7	0	6
(Slovakia) K Kučera	5	6	3
(United States) J Tarango	7^{7}	6
2	(Germany) M Stich	6^{5}	3

Second round
6	(Austria) G Schaller	7	6
(Czech Republic) B Ulihrach	5	2
WC	(Australia) A Ilie	6	3	3
4	(Italy) A Gaudenzi	3	6	6
(Spain) F Clavet	2	3
(Spain) J Arrese	6	6
(Norway) C Ruud	6	7^{9}
(United States) J Tarango	2	6^{7}

Quarterfinals
6	(Austria) G Schaller	6	4	6
4	(Italy) A Gaudenzi	3	6	3
(Spain) J Arrese	7^{7}	4	4
(Norway) C Ruud	6^{4}	6	6

Semifinals
6	(Austria) G Schaller	6	7^{7}
(Norway) C Ruud	3	6^{5}

== Qualifying ==
=== Qualifying seeds ===
1. (Australia) Richard Fromberg (first round)
2. (Spain) Óscar Martínez (first round)
3. (Argentina) Franco Davín (second round)
4. (Germany) Oliver Gross (first round)
5. (France) Jérôme Golmard (qualifying competition)
6. (Spain) Albert Portas (qualifying competition)
7. (Hungary) Sándor Noszály (qualified)
8. (Spain) Marcos Górriz (qualifying competition)

=== Qualifiers ===
1. (Spain) Pepe Imaz
2. (Hungary) Sándor Noszály
3. (Romania) George Cosac
4. (Romania) Remus Farcas

=== Qualifying draw ===
==== First qualifier ====
First round
1	(Australia) Richard Fromberg	4	3
(Australia) Allen Belobrajdic	6	6
(Romania) Cosmin Reti	4	1
(Spain) Pepe Imaz	6	6
WC	(Romania) Constantin Obretin	4	4
(Australia) Wayne Arthurs	6	6
(Romania) Gabriel Trifu	3	1
8	(Spain) Marcos Górriz	6	6

Second round
(Australia) Allen Belobrajdic	0	1
(Spain) Pepe Imaz	6	6
(Australia) Wayne Arthurs	4	2
8	(Spain) Marcos Górriz	6	6

Qualifying competition
(Spain) Pepe Imaz	6	6
8	(Spain) Marcos Górriz	3	4

==== Second qualifier ====
First round
2	(Spain) Óscar Martínez	2	1
(Italy) Carlo Santoro	6	6
(Romania) Răzvan Sabău	3	1^{r}
(Spain) Galo Blanco	6	3
(Romania) Ciprian Petre Porumb	6	6	6
(France) Gérard Solvès	7	1	2
(Poland) Bartłomiej Dąbrowski	6	1	2
7	(Hungary) Sándor Noszály	3	6	6

Second round
(Italy) Carlo Santoro	6	1
(Spain) Galo Blanco	7	6
(Romania) Ciprian Petre Porumb	1	5
7	(Hungary) Sándor Noszály	6	7

Qualifying competition
(Spain) Galo Blanco	4	3
7	(Hungary) Sándor Noszály	6	6

==== Third qualifier ====
First round
3	(Argentina) Franco Davín	6	6
(Romania) Florin Segărceanu	3	2
(Italy) Pietro Pennisi	1	6
(Romania) George Cosac	6	7
WC	(Romania) Ionuț Moldovan	6	3
(Romania) Răzvan Itu	7	6
(South Africa) David Adams	7	1	2
6	(Spain) Albert Portas	6	6	6

Second round
3	(Argentina) Franco Davín	0	4
(Romania) George Cosac	6	6
(Romania) Răzvan Itu	3	1
6	(Spain) Albert Portas	6	6

Qualifying competition
(Romania) George Cosac	6	6
6	(Spain) Albert Portas	3	3

==== Fourth qualifier ====
First round
4	(Germany) Oliver Gross	1	6	3
(Romania) Remus Farcas	6	4	6
(Poland) Michal Piekos	6	5	6
(South Africa) Piet Norval	0	7	2
(Russia) Andrei Cherkasov	6	6
(United States) Ellis Ferreira	1	3
WC	(Romania) Marius Călugăru	0	1
5	(France) Jérôme Golmard	6	6

Second round
(Romania) Remus Farcas	6	6
(Poland) Michal Piekos	3	4
(Russia) Andrei Cherkasov	2	0^{r}
5	(France) Jérôme Golmard	6	4

Qualifying competition
(Romania) Remus Farcas	1	6	6
5	(France) Jérôme Golmard	6	3	2
