= 1995 Romanian Open – Doubles =

Doubles
- 1995 Romanian Open

Final
- Champions: (United States) Mark Keil (United States) Jeff Tarango
- Runners-up: (Czech Republic) Cyril Suk (Czech Republic) Daniel Vacek
- Score: 6–4, 7–6

Details
- Draw: 16 (3WC/1Q)
- Seeds: 4

Events
Singles	Doubles
← 1994 ·	Romanian Open	· 1996 →

Wayne Arthurs and Simon Youl were the defending champions, but Youl retired from professional tennis at the end of the 1994 season. Arthurs teamed up with Jordi Arrese and lost in the first round to Tom Kempers and Menno Oosting.

Mark Keil and Jeff Tarango won the title by defeating Cyril Suk and Daniel Vacek 6–4, 7–6 in the final.

== Seeds ==
1. (Czech Republic) Cyril Suk / (Czech Republic) Daniel Vacek (final)
2. (Argentina) Luis Lobo / (Spain) Javier Sánchez (quarterfinals)
3. (Australia) Mark Philippoussis / (Australia) Patrick Rafter (semifinals)
4. (Germany) Marc-Kevin Goellner / (South Africa) Piet Norval (first round)

== Draw ==
=== Key ===
- Q = Qualifier
- WC = Wild card
- LL = Lucky loser
- Alt = Alternate
- ITF = ITF entry
- PR = Protected ranking
- SR = Special ranking
- SE = Special exempt
- JE = Junior exempt
- JR = Junior Accelerator Programme entrant
- CO = College Accelerator Programme entrant
- NG = Next Gen Accelerator Program entrant
- w/o = Walkover
- r = Retired
- d = Defaulted

=== Draw ===
First round
1	(Czech Republic) C Suk (Czech Republic) D Vacek	6	6
WC	(Australia) A Ilie (Romania) I Moldovan	3	3
Q	(France) J Golmard (France) F Santoro	5	2
WC	(Romania) G Cosac (Romania) D Pescariu	7	6
3	(Australia) M Philippoussis (Australia) P Rafter	6	2	6
(France) A Boetsch (France) G Forget	3	6	2
(Spain) T Carbonell (Italy) A Gaudenzi	6	6
(South Africa) D Adams (South Africa) E Ferreira	0	4
(Spain) J Arrese (Australia) W Arthurs	7	4	6
(Netherlands) T Kempers (Netherlands) M Oosting	6	6	7
(United States) M Keil (United States) J Tarango	7	4	7
4	(Germany) MK Goellner (South Africa) P Norval	6	6	6
(Austria) A Antonitsch (Netherlands) T Nijssen	3	3
(Belgium) L Pimek (South Africa) B Talbot	6	6
WC	(Germany) P Kühnen (Germany) M Stich	6	3	6
2	(Argentina) L Lobo (Spain) J Sánchez	4	6	7

Quarterfinals
1	(Czech Republic) C Suk (Czech Republic) D Vacek	7	6
WC	(Romania) G Cosac (Romania) D Pescariu	6	3
3	(Australia) M Philippoussis (Australia) P Rafter	4	6	6
(Spain) T Carbonell (Italy) A Gaudenzi	6	3	3
(Netherlands) T Kempers (Netherlands) M Oosting	2	3
(United States) M Keil (United States) J Tarango	6	6
(Belgium) L Pimek (South Africa) B Talbot	6	7
2	(Argentina) L Lobo (Spain) J Sánchez	2	6

Semifinals
1	(Czech Republic) C Suk (Czech Republic) D Vacek	6	3	6
3	(Australia) M Philippoussis (Australia) P Rafter	4	6	3
(United States) M Keil (United States) J Tarango	4	7	6
(Belgium) L Pimek (South Africa) B Talbot	6	6	4

Final
1	(Czech Republic) C Suk (Czech Republic) D Vacek	4	6
(United States) M Keil (United States) J Tarango	6	7

== Qualifying ==
=== Qualifying seeds ===
1. (Italy) Renzo Furlan / (Romania) Adrian Voinea (qualifying competition)
2. (France) Jérôme Golmard / (France) Fabrice Santoro (qualified)

=== Qualifiers ===
1. (France) Jérôme Golmard / (France) Fabrice Santoro

=== Qualifying draw ===
First round
1	(Italy) Renzo Furlan (Romania) Adrian Voinea	6	6
(Romania) Răzvan Sabău (Romania) Gabriel Trifu	3	2
WC	(Romania) Remus Farcas (Romania) Florin Segărceanu	1	2
2	(France) Jérôme Golmard (France) Fabrice Santoro	6	6

Qualifying competition
1	(Italy) Renzo Furlan (Romania) Adrian Voinea	2	7	3
2	(France) Jérôme Golmard (France) Fabrice Santoro	6	5	6
