= 1994 Romanian Open – Doubles =

Doubles
- 1994 Romanian Open

Final
- Champions: (Australia) Wayne Arthurs (Australia) Simon Youl
- Runners-up: (Spain) Jordi Arrese (Spain) José Antonio Conde
- Score: 6–4, 6–4

Events
Singles	Doubles
← 1993 ·	Romanian Open	· 1995 →

Menno Oosting and Libor Pimek were the defending champions, but competed this year with different partners. Oosting teamed up with Federico Mordegan and lost in the first round to Saša Hiršzon and Goran Ivanišević, while Pimek teamed up with Filip Dewulf and also lost in the first round to Jon Ireland and Jack Waite.

Wayne Arthurs and Simon Youl won the title by defeating Jordi Arrese and José Antonio Conde 6–4, 6–4 in the final.

== Seeds ==
1. (Italy) Federico Mordegan / (Netherlands) Menno Oosting (first round)
2. (Spain) Tomás Carbonell / (Spain) Francisco Roig (quarterfinals)
3. (United Kingdom) Neil Broad / (United States) Greg Van Emburgh (first round)
4. (Australia) Jon Ireland / (United States) Jack Waite (quarterfinals)

== Draw ==
=== Key ===
- Q = Qualifier
- WC = Wild card
- LL = Lucky loser
- Alt = Alternate
- ITF = ITF entry
- PR = Protected ranking
- SR = Special ranking
- SE = Special exempt
- JE = Junior exempt
- JR = Junior Accelerator Programme entrant
- CO = College Accelerator Programme entrant
- NG = Next Gen Accelerator Program entrant
- w/o = Walkover
- r = Retired
- d = Defaulted

=== Draw ===
First round
1	(Italy) F Mordegan (Netherlands) M Oosting	3	4
WC	(Croatia) S Hiršzon (Croatia) G Ivanišević	6	6
(Czech Republic) V Flégl (Slovakia) K Kučera	4	2
(Australia) W Arthurs (Australia) S Youl	6	6
4	(Australia) J Ireland (United States) J Waite	6	6
(Belgium) F Dewulf (Belgium) L Pimek	3	4
(United States) M Blackman (Italy) R Furlan	6	6
Q	(France) P Gauthier (Argentina) C Gómez-Díaz	3	2
(Hungary) G Köves (Hungary) L Markovits	6	6
WC	(Romania) A Pavel (Romania) R Sabău	7	7
(Italy) A Gaudenzi (Australia) B Larkham	6	6
3	(United Kingdom) N Broad (United States) G Van Emburgh	4	4
WC	(Romania) G Cosac (Romania) CP Porumb	6	3	6
(Spain) J Arrese (Spain) JA Conde	1	6	7
(Latvia) Ģ Dzelde (Portugal) B Mota	3	3
2	(Spain) T Carbonell (Spain) F Roig	6	6

Quarterfinals
WC	(Croatia) S Hiršzon (Croatia) G Ivanišević	6	1	4
(Australia) W Arthurs (Australia) S Youl	3	6	6
4	(Australia) J Ireland (United States) J Waite	6	6
(United States) M Blackman (Italy) R Furlan	7	7
WC	(Romania) A Pavel (Romania) R Sabău	6	2	6
(Italy) A Gaudenzi (Australia) B Larkham	4	6	4
(Spain) J Arrese (Spain) JA Conde	6	7
2	(Spain) T Carbonell (Spain) F Roig	4	6

Semifinals
(Australia) W Arthurs (Australia) S Youl	6	6
(United States) M Blackman (Italy) R Furlan	4	2
WC	(Romania) A Pavel (Romania) R Sabău	4	6	4
(Spain) J Arrese (Spain) JA Conde	6	4	6

Final
(Australia) W Arthurs (Australia) S Youl	6	6
(Spain) J Arrese (Spain) JA Conde	4	4
