= 1997 Romanian Open – Doubles =

Doubles
- 1997 Romanian Open

Final
- Champions: (Argentina) Luis Lobo (Spain) Javier Sánchez
- Runners-up: (Netherlands) Hendrik Jan Davids (Argentina) Daniel Orsanic
- Score: 7–5, 7–5

Details
- Draw: 16 (3WC/1Q)
- Seeds: 4

Events
Singles	Doubles
← 1996 ·	Romanian Open	· 1998 →

David Ekerot and Jeff Tarango were the defending champions, but Ekerot did not compete this year. Tarango teamed up with Roger Smith and lost in the first round to Luis Lobo and Javier Sánchez.

Lobo and Sánchez won the title by defeating Hendrik Jan Davids and Daniel Orsanic 7–5, 7–5 in the final.

== Seeds ==
1. (Argentina) Luis Lobo / (Spain) Javier Sánchez (champions)
2. (United States) Donald Johnson / (United States) Francisco Montana (semifinals)
3. (Spain) Tomás Carbonell / (Spain) Francisco Roig (first round)
4. (Argentina) Pablo Albano / (Spain) Àlex Corretja (first round)

== Draw ==
=== Key ===
- Q = Qualifier
- WC = Wild card
- LL = Lucky loser
- Alt = Alternate
- ITF = ITF entry
- PR = Protected ranking
- SR = Special ranking
- SE = Special exempt
- JE = Junior exempt
- JR = Junior Accelerator Programme entrant
- CO = College Accelerator Programme entrant
- NG = Next Gen Accelerator Program entrant
- w/o = Walkover
- r = Retired
- d = Defaulted

=== Draw ===
First round
1	(Argentina) L Lobo (Spain) J Sánchez	6	6
(The Bahamas) R Smith (United States) J Tarango	4	3
WC	(Romania) A Pavel (Romania) G Trifu	6	2
(Australia) A Kratzmann (Belgium) L Pimek	7	6
4	(Argentina) P Albano (Spain) À Corretja	4	3
(Spain) A Berasategui (Spain) A Martín	6	6
(Italy) C Brandi (Ecuador) N Lapentti	6	6
(United States) K Kinnear (North Macedonia) A Kitinov	4	4
WC	(Romania) I Moldovan (Romania) D Pescariu	5	4
(Netherlands) HJ Davids (Argentina) D Orsanic	7	6
(United States) B Coupe (South Africa) P Rosner	6	7
3	(Spain) T Carbonell (Spain) F Roig	4	5
Q	(Spain) J Alonso (Spain) E Sánchez	6	6	7
(South Africa) B Haygarth (United States) G Van Emburgh	7	2	5
WC	(Romania) G Cosac (Romania) R Sabău	6	1	1
2	(United States) D Johnson (United States) F Montana	4	6	6

Quarterfinals
1	(Argentina) L Lobo (Spain) J Sánchez	6	7
(Australia) A Kratzmann (Belgium) L Pimek	4	6
(Spain) A Berasategui (Spain) A Martín	6	6	1
(Italy) C Brandi (Ecuador) N Lapentti	7	4	6
(Netherlands) HJ Davids (Argentina) D Orsanic	6	7
(United States) B Coupe (South Africa) P Rosner	3	5
Q	(Spain) J Alonso (Spain) E Sánchez	6	4
2	(United States) D Johnson (United States) F Montana	7	6

Semifinals
1	(Argentina) L Lobo (Spain) J Sánchez	7	6
(Italy) C Brandi (Ecuador) N Lapentti	5	2
(Netherlands) HJ Davids (Argentina) D Orsanic	3	6	6
2	(United States) D Johnson (United States) F Montana	6	3	2

Final
1	(Argentina) L Lobo (Spain) J Sánchez	7	7
(Netherlands) HJ Davids (Argentina) D Orsanic	5	5
