= 1999 Connex Open Romania – Doubles =

Doubles
- 1999 Connex Open Romania

Final
- Champions: (Argentina) Lucas Arnold Ker (Argentina) Martín García
- Runners-up: (Germany) Marc-Kevin Goellner (United States) Francisco Montana
- Score: 6–3, 2–6, 6–3

Events
Singles	Doubles
← 1998 ·	Romanian Open	· 2000 →

Andrei Pavel and Gabriel Trifu were the defending champions, but were forced to withdraw before their semifinal match.

Lucas Arnold Ker and Martín García won the title by defeating Marc-Kevin Goellner and Francisco Montana 6–3, 2–6, 6–3 in the final.

== Seeds ==
1. (Argentina) Pablo Albano / (Spain) Tomás Carbonell (first round)
2. (Brazil) Jaime Oncins / (Argentina) Daniel Orsanic (first round)
3. (South Africa) Lan Bale / (South Africa) Piet Norval (semifinals)
4. (Italy) Cristian Brandi / (Italy) Massimo Bertolini (first round)

== Draw ==
=== Key ===
- Q = Qualifier
- WC = Wild card
- LL = Lucky loser
- Alt = Alternate
- ITF = ITF entry
- PR = Protected ranking
- SR = Special ranking
- SE = Special exempt
- JE = Junior exempt
- JR = Junior Accelerator Programme entrant
- CO = College Accelerator Programme entrant
- NG = Next Gen Accelerator Program entrant
- w/o = Walkover
- r = Retired
- d = Defaulted

=== Draw ===
First round
1	(Argentina) P Albano (Spain) T Carbonell	4	3
(Argentina) L Arnold Ker (Argentina) M García	6	6
(United States) D Bowen (Israel) E Ran	4	3
(Czech Republic) P Pála (Czech Republic) P Vízner	6	6
3	(South Africa) L Bale (South Africa) P Norval	6	6
(North Macedonia) A Kitinov (United States) J Waite	4	4
(Argentina) M Puerta (Spain) J Sánchez	7	7^{9}
WC	(Romania) I Moldovan (Romania) R Sabău	5	6^{7}
(Argentina) D del Río (Spain) A Martín	6^{3}	1
WC	(Romania) A Pavel (Romania) G Trifu	7^{7}	6
WC	(Romania) G Cosac (Romania) D Pescariu	3	6	6
4	(Italy) M Bertolini (Italy) C Brandi	6	4	3
(Germany) MK Goellner (United States) F Montana	6	6^{6}	7
Q	(Federal Republic of Yugoslavia) D Vemić (Federal Republic of Yugoslavia) N Zimonjić	3	7^{8}	5
(Argentina) M Hood (Argentina) S Prieto	6^{4}	6	6
2	(Brazil) J Oncins (Argentina) D Orsanic	7^{7}	1	3

Quarterfinals
(Argentina) L Arnold Ker (Argentina) M García	6	6
(Czech Republic) P Pála (Czech Republic) P Vízner	1	1
3	(South Africa) L Bale (South Africa) P Norval	6	6
(Argentina) M Puerta (Spain) J Sánchez	4	2
WC	(Romania) A Pavel (Romania) G Trifu	6	6
WC	(Romania) G Cosac (Romania) D Pescariu	4	4
(Germany) MK Goellner (United States) F Montana	7	6
(Argentina) M Hood (Argentina) S Prieto	5	4

Semifinals
(Argentina) L Arnold Ker (Argentina) M García	6	6
3	(South Africa) L Bale (South Africa) P Norval	4	2
WC	(Romania) A Pavel (Romania) G Trifu
(Germany) MK Goellner (United States) F Montana	w/o

Final
(Argentina) L Arnold Ker (Argentina) M García	6	2	6
(Germany) MK Goellner (United States) F Montana	3	6	3
