= 1995 Davis Cup Europe/Africa Zone Group I =

International tennis competition

The Europe/Africa Zone was one of the three zones of the regional Davis Cup competition in 1995.

In the Europe/Africa Zone there were three different tiers, called groups, in which teams competed against each other to advance to the upper tier. Winners in Group I advanced to the World Group qualifying round, along with losing teams from the World Group first round. Teams who lost in the first round competed in the relegation play-offs, with winning teams remaining in Group I, whereas teams who lost their play-off were relegated to the Europe/Africa Zone Group II in 1996.

== Participating nations ==
- Hungary
- Israel
- Morocco
- Norway
- Portugal
- Romania
- Slovenia
- Zimbabwe

=== Draw ===
Relegation Play-offs
Estoril, Portugal (clay)
Romania	3
Portugal	2
Ramat HaSharon, Israel (hard)
Slovenia	0
Israel	5

First Round
Casablanca, Morocco (clay)
Morocco	4
Romania	1
Budapest, Hungary (indoor carpet)
Portugal	2
Hungary	3
Portorož, Slovenia (clay)
Slovenia	0
Zimbabwe	5
Oslo, Norway (indoor hard)
Norway	4
Israel	1

- Morocco, Hungary, Zimbabwe and Norway advance to World Group qualifying round.
- Portugal and Slovenia relegated to Group II in 1996.

== First round ==
=== Morocco vs. Romania ===
Morocco
4
Complexe Al Amal, Casablanca, Morocco
31 March–2 April 1995
Clay

Romania
1

			1	2	3	4	5
1	(Morocco) (Romania)	Karim Alami; Răzvan Sabău	6; 1	6; 0	6; 2
2	(Morocco) (Romania)	Hicham Arazi; Adrian Voinea	6; 3	1; 6	7; 5	7^{7} 6^{3}
3	(Morocco) (Romania)	Karim Alami / Hicham Arazi; George Cosac / Ciprian Petre Porumb	7; 5	6; 1	6; 3
4	(Morocco) (Romania)	Younes El Aynaoui; Adrian Voinea	0; 6					retired
5	(Morocco) (Romania)	Hicham Arazi; Răzvan Sabău	7^{7} 6^{2}	6; 3

=== Hungary vs. Portugal ===
Hungary
3
Vasas Stadium, Budapest, Hungary
31 March–2 April 1995
Carpet (indoors)

Portugal
2

			1	2	3	4	5
1	(Hungary) (Portugal)	Sándor Noszály; Emanuel Couto	6^{8} 7^{10}	6; 2	6; 4	2; 6	3; 6
2	(Hungary) (Portugal)	József Krocskó; João Cunha e Silva	6; 1	6; 3	6^{5} 7^{7}	6; 4
3	(Hungary) (Portugal)	Gábor Köves / László Markovits; Emanuel Couto / João Cunha e Silva	6^{2} 7^{7}	6; 2	6^{4} 7^{7}	6; 4	6; 2
4	(Hungary) (Portugal)	Sándor Noszály; João Cunha e Silva	7; 5	5; 7	6; 4	6; 4
5	(Hungary) (Portugal)	József Krocskó; Bernardo Mota	1; 6	6; 3	3; 6

=== Slovenia vs. Zimbabwe ===
Slovenia
0
Teniški klub Portorož, Portorož, Slovenia
31 March–2 April 1995
Clay

Zimbabwe
5

			1	2	3	4	5
1	(Slovenia) (Zimbabwe)	Iztok Božič; Wayne Black	6; 4	3; 6	6^{3} 7^{7}	4; 6
2	(Slovenia) (Zimbabwe)	Jaka Božič; Byron Black	6^{7} 7^{9}	4; 6	0; 6
3	(Slovenia) (Zimbabwe)	Jaka Božič / Blaž Trupej; Byron Black / Wayne Black	2; 6	1; 6	3; 6
4	(Slovenia) (Zimbabwe)	Iztok Božič; Byron Black	4; 6	6; 3	3; 6
5	(Slovenia) (Zimbabwe)	Jaka Božič; Wayne Black	6^{4} 7^{7}	4; 6

=== Norway vs. Israel ===
Norway
4
Riksanlegget, Oslo, Norway
31 March–2 April 1995
Hard (indoors)

Israel
1

			1	2	3	4	5
1	(Norway) (Israel)	Helge Koll-Frafjord; Gilad Bloom	3; 6	4; 6	6^{9} 7^{11}
2	(Norway) (Israel)	Christian Ruud; Eyal Ran	7; 5	3; 6	6; 3	6; 3
3	(Norway) (Israel)	Bent-Ove Pedersen / Christian Ruud; Noam Behr / Eyal Erlich	6; 4	6; 4	6; 2
4	(Norway) (Israel)	Christian Ruud; Gilad Bloom	6; 1	3; 6	6; 1	6; 4
5	(Norway) (Israel)	Helge Koll-Frafjord; Eyal Ran	6^{2} 7^{7}	6; 4	6; 3

== Relegation play-offs ==
=== Portugal vs. Romania ===
Portugal
2
Clube de Ténis do Estoril, Estoril, Portugal
22–24 September 1995
Clay

Romania
3

			1	2	3	4	5
1	(Portugal) (Romania)	Emanuel Couto; Adrian Voinea	2; 6	2; 6	1; 6
2	(Portugal) (Romania)	João Cunha e Silva; Dinu Pescariu	1; 6	1; 6	2; 6
3	(Portugal) (Romania)	Emanuel Couto / João Cunha e Silva; George Cosac / Andrei Pavel	6; 4	3; 6	6; 4	7^{7} 6^{3}
4	(Portugal) (Romania)	João Cunha e Silva; Adrian Voinea	2; 6	4; 6	2; 6
5	(Portugal) (Romania)	Emanuel Couto; Dinu Pescariu	6; 2	7; 5

=== Israel vs. Slovenia ===
Israel
5
Canada Stadium, Ramat HaSharon, Israel
21–23 September 1995
Hard

Slovenia
0

			1	2	3	4	5
1	(Israel) (Slovenia)	Eyal Ran; Borut Urh	6; 1	6; 3	6; 4
2	(Israel) (Slovenia)	Eyal Erlich; Iztok Božič	4; 6	6; 4	6; 3	5; 7	6; 4
3	(Israel) (Slovenia)	Noam Behr / Gilad Bloom; Jaka Božič / Žiga Janškovec	7; 5	7^{7} 6^{5}	6; 1
4	(Israel) (Slovenia)	Noam Behr; Iztok Božič	6; 3	7^{11} 6^{9}
5	(Israel) (Slovenia)	Eyal Erlich; Borut Urh	7^{7} 6^{5}	6^{6} 7^{8}	6; 0
