= 1996 Romanian Open – Doubles =

Doubles
- 1996 Open Romania
- 1995 Champions: (United States) Mark Keil (United States) Jeff Tarango

Final
- Champions: (Sweden) David Ekerot (United States) Jeff Tarango
- Runners-up: (South Africa) David Adams (Netherlands) Menno Oosting
- Score: 7–6, 7–6

Details
- Draw: 16
- Seeds: 4

Events
| Singles | Doubles |
| ← 1995 · | Open Romania | · 1997 → |

Mark Keil and Jeff Tarango were the defending champions but only Tarango competed that year with David Ekerot.

Ekerot and Tarango won in the final 7–6, 7–6 against David Adams and Menno Oosting.

== Seeds ==
Champion seeds are indicated in bold text while text in italics indicates the round in which those seeds were eliminated.

1. (Belgium) Libor Pimek / (South Africa) Byron Talbot (semifinals)
2. (South Africa) David Adams / (Netherlands) Menno Oosting (final)
3. n/a
4. (Sweden) **David Ekerot** / (United States) **Jeff Tarango (champions)**

== Draw ==
=== Key ===
- Q = Qualifier
- WC = Wild card
- LL = Lucky loser
- Alt = Alternate
- SE = Special exempt
- PR = Protected ranking
- ITF = ITF entry
- JE = Junior exempt
- w/o = Walkover
- r = Retired
- d = Defaulted
- SR = Special ranking

First round
1 | (Belgium) **L Pimek** (South Africa) **B Talbot** | **6** | **6**
WC | (Hungary) S Noszály (Austria) G Schaller | 0 | 0
(Romania) **G Cosac** (Romania) **A Pavel** | **6** | **7**
LL | (Australia) R Fromberg (Australia) J Sekulov | 2 | 6
4 | (Sweden) **D Ekerot** (United States) **J Tarango** | **7** | **7**
(Romania) I Moldovan (Romania) D Pescariu | 5 | 6
WC | (Spain) **A Berasategui** (Spain) **G Blanco** | **6** | 5 | **6**
(United States) B Coupe (United States) T Phillips | 3 | **7** | 3
(United States) J Belloli (Australia) J Ireland | **7** | 4 | 6
WC | (Morocco) **H Arazi** (Romania) **F Segărceanu** | 5 | **6** | **7**
(Argentina) **M Hood** (Argentina) **S Prieto** | 4 | **6** | **6**
Q | (Spain) D Salvador (Spain) F Vicente | **6** | 4 | 4
(Croatia) S Hiršzon (Croatia) G Ivanišević | 4 | 2
(Romania) **CP Porumb** (Romania) **G Trifu** | **6** | **6**
(Argentina) F Browne (Argentina) A Zingman | 6 | 4
2 | (South Africa) **D Adams** (Netherlands) **M Oosting** | **7** | **6**

Quarterfinals
1 | (Belgium) **L Pimek** (South Africa) **B Talbot** | **7** | 1 | **7**
(Romania) G Cosac (Romania) A Pavel | 5 | **6** | 6
4 | (Sweden) **D Ekerot** (United States) **J Tarango** | 4 | **6** | **6**
WC | (Spain) A Berasategui (Spain) G Blanco | **6** | 1 | 4
WC | (Morocco) **H Arazi** (Romania) **F Segărceanu** | 6 | **7** | **6**
(Argentina) M Hood (Argentina) S Prieto | **7** | 5 | 2
(Romania) CP Porumb (Romania) G Trifu | 3 | 4
2 | (South Africa) **D Adams** (Netherlands) **M Oosting** | **6** | **6**

Semifinals
1 | (Belgium) L Pimek (South Africa) B Talbot | 6 | **6** | 1
4 | (Sweden) **D Ekerot** (United States) **J Tarango** | **7** | 3 | **6**
WC | (Morocco) H Arazi (Romania) F Segărceanu | **6** | 4 | 6
2 | (South Africa) **D Adams** (Netherlands) **M Oosting** | 1 | **6** | **7**

Final
4 | (Sweden) **David Ekerot** (United States) **Jeff Tarango** | **7** | **7**
2 | (South Africa) David Adams (United States) Jeff Tarango | 6 | 6
