= 1994 Davis Cup Europe/Africa Zone Group I =

International tennis competition

The Europe/Africa Zone was one of the three zones of the regional Davis Cup competition in 1994.

In the Europe/Africa Zone there were three different tiers, called groups, in which teams competed against each other to advance to the upper tier. Winners in Group I advanced to the World Group qualifying round, along with losing teams from the World Group first round. Teams who lost in the first round competed in the relegation play-off, with winning teams remaining in Group I, whereas teams who lost their play-off were relegated to the Europe/Africa Zone Group II in 1995.

== Participating nations ==
- Croatia
- Great Britain
- Luxembourg
- Norway
- Portugal
- Romania
- South Africa
- Switzerland
- Zimbabwe

=== Draw ===
Preliminary Round; 4–6 February
Harare, Zimbabwe (indoor hard)
Zimbabwe | 4
Luxembourg | 1

First Round; 25–27 March
Johannesburg, South Africa (indoor hard)
South Africa | 5
Romania | 0
Porto, Portugal (clay)
Portugal | 4
Great Britain | 1
Zagreb, Croatia (indoor clay)
Croatia | 3
Norway | 2
Harare, Zimbabwe (indoor hard)
Zimbabwe | 2
Switzerland | 3

Relegation Play-off; 15–17 July
Manchester, United Kingdom (grass)
Romania | 3
Great Britain | 2

- South Africa, Portugal, Switzerland and Croatia advance to World Group qualifying round.
- Great Britain and Luxembourg relegated to Group II in 1995.

== Preliminary round ==
=== Zimbabwe vs. Luxembourg ===
Zimbabwe
4
City Sports Centre, Harare, Zimbabwe
4–6 February 1994
Hard (indoors)

Luxembourg
1

| | | | 1 | 2 | 3 | 4 | 5 |
|---|---|---|---|---|---|---|---|
| 1 | (Zimbabwe) (Luxembourg) | Wayne Black; Anthony Mills | 6; 1 | 6; 1 | 6; 2 |
| 2 | (Zimbabwe) (Luxembourg) | Mark Gurr; Adrian Graimprey | 7; 5 | 6; 4 | 3; 6 | 7^{7} 6^{2} |
| 3 | (Zimbabwe) (Luxembourg) | Malcolm Birch / Wayne Black; Adrian Graimprey / Frédéric Watry | 6; 4 | 6; 3 | 6; 3 |
| 4 | (Zimbabwe) (Luxembourg) | Wayne Black; Adrian Graimprey | 6; 4 | 3; 6 | 6; 2 |
| 5 | (Zimbabwe) (Luxembourg) | Gwinyai Tongoona; Anthony Mills | 3; 6 | 5; 7 |

== First round ==
=== South Africa vs. Romania ===
South Africa
5
Ellis Park Arena, Johannesburg, South Africa
25–27 March 1994
Hard (indoors)

Romania
0

| | | | 1 | 2 | 3 | 4 | 5 |
|---|---|---|---|---|---|---|---|
| 1 | (South Africa) (Romania) | Marcos Ondruska; Dinu Pescariu | 5; 7 | 6; 2 | 6; 1 | 3; 6 | 6; 1 |
| 2 | (South Africa) (Romania) | Wayne Ferreira; Răzvan Sabău | 6; 4 | 6; 3 | 6; 3 |
| 3 | (South Africa) (Romania) | Wayne Ferreira / Danie Visser; George Cosac / Ciprian Petre Porumb | 6; 4 | 6; 4 | 6; 3 |
| 4 | (South Africa) (Romania) | Wayne Ferreira; Dinu Pescariu | 4; 6 | 6; 3 | 6; 3 |
| 5 | (South Africa) (Romania) | Marcos Ondruska; Răzvan Sabău | 3; 6 | 7^{8} 6^{6} | 6; 3 |

=== Portugal vs. Great Britain ===
Portugal
4
Lawn Tennis Club da Foz, Porto, Portugal
25–27 March 1994
Clay

Great Britain
1

| | | | 1 | 2 | 3 | 4 | 5 |
|---|---|---|---|---|---|---|---|
| 1 | (Portugal) (United Kingdom) | Nuno Marques; Mark Petchey | 6; 1 | 7^{7} 6^{2} | 6; 1 |
| 2 | (Portugal) (United Kingdom) | Emanuel Couto; Jeremy Bates | 6; 3 | 5; 7 | 4; 6 | 6; 1 | 6; 0 |
| 3 | (Portugal) (United Kingdom) | Nuno Marques / João Cunha e Silva; Jeremy Bates / Mark Petchey | 5; 7 | 6; 4 | 7^{7} 6^{5} | 3; 6 | 6; 8 |
| 4 | (Portugal) (United Kingdom) | Nuno Marques; Jeremy Bates | 4; 6 | 6; 1 | 6; 4 | 6; 0 |
| 5 | (Portugal) (United Kingdom) | Emanuel Couto; Mark Petchey | 6; 1 | 6; 2 |

=== Croatia vs. Norway ===
Croatia
3
Centar Dražen Petrović, Zagreb, Croatia
25–27 March 1994
Clay (indoors)

Norway
2

| | | | 1 | 2 | 3 | 4 | 5 |
|---|---|---|---|---|---|---|---|
| 1 | (Croatia) (Norway) | Goran Ivanišević; Anders Håseth | 6; 2 | 6; 0 | 6; 1 |
| 2 | (Croatia) (Norway) | Saša Hiršzon; Christian Ruud | 1; 6 | 7^{7} 6^{5} | 6^{6} 7^{8} | 1; 6 |
| 3 | (Croatia) (Norway) | Saša Hiršzon / Goran Ivanišević; Bent-Ove Pedersen / Christian Ruud | 2; 6 | 6^{4} 7^{7} | 7; 5 | 6; 4 | 11; 9 |
| 4 | (Croatia) (Norway) | Goran Ivanišević; Christian Ruud | 6; 3 | 4; 6 | 6; 2 | 3; 6 | 5; 7 |
| 5 | (Croatia) (Norway) | Saša Hiršzon; Helge Koll-Frafjord | 6; 3 | 6; 2 | 7^{15} 6^{13} |

=== Zimbabwe vs. Switzerland ===
Zimbabwe
2
City Sports Centre, Harare, Zimbabwe
25–27 March 1994
Hard (indoors)

Switzerland
3

| | | | 1 | 2 | 3 | 4 | 5 |
|---|---|---|---|---|---|---|---|
| 1 | (Zimbabwe) (Switzerland) | Wayne Black; Marc Rosset | 3; 6 | 4; 6 | 1; 6 |
| 2 | (Zimbabwe) (Switzerland) | Byron Black; Jakob Hlasek | 7; 5 | 7^{7} 6^{0} | 6; 4 |
| 3 | (Zimbabwe) (Switzerland) | Byron Black / Wayne Black; Jakob Hlasek / Marc Rosset | 6; 3 | 6; 3 | 6; 4 |
| 4 | (Zimbabwe) (Switzerland) | Byron Black; Marc Rosset | 4; 6 | 6; 3 | 6^{6} 7^{8} | 6^{6} 7^{8} |
| 5 | (Zimbabwe) (Switzerland) | Wayne Black; Jakob Hlasek | 6; 4 | 5; 7 | 3; 6 | 4; 6 |

== Relegation play-off ==
=== Great Britain vs. Romania ===
Great Britain
2
Northern Lawn Tennis Club, Manchester, United Kingdom
15–17 July 1994
Grass

Romania
3

| | | | 1 | 2 | 3 | 4 | 5 |
|---|---|---|---|---|---|---|---|
| 1 | (United Kingdom) (Romania) | Jeremy Bates; Răzvan Sabău | 6; 0 | 6; 3 | 6^{3} 7^{7} | 2; 6 | 2; 6 |
| 2 | (United Kingdom) (Romania) | Mark Petchey; Andrei Pavel | 6; 3 | 3; 6 | 4; 6 | 2; 6 |
| 3 | (United Kingdom) (Romania) | Jeremy Bates / Tim Henman; George Cosac / Dinu Pescariu | 6; 2 | 6^{5} 7^{7} | 5; 7 | 6; 2 | 6; 1 |
| 4 | (United Kingdom) (Romania) | Jeremy Bates; Andrei Pavel | 6; 3 | 7^{7} 6^{2} | 6; 2 |
| 5 | (United Kingdom) (Romania) | Mark Petchey; Răzvan Sabău | 7; 5 | 4; 6 | 7^{7} 6^{3} | 3; 6 | 2; 6 |
