= 1998 Romanian Open – Singles =

Singles
- 1998 Romanian Open

Final
- Champion: (Spain) Francisco Clavet
- Runner-up: (France) Arnaud Di Pasquale
- Score: 6–4, 2–6, 7–5

Details
- Draw: 32
- Seeds: 8

Events
| Singles | Doubles |
| ← 1997 · | Romanian Open | · 1999 → |

The 1998 Romanian Open was a men's tennis tournament played on Clay in Bucharest, Romania that was part of the World Series of the 1998 ATP Tour. It was the sixth edition of the tournament and was held from 14 September – 21 September.

== Seeds ==
Champion seeds are indicated in bold text while text in italics indicates the round in which those seeds were eliminated.

1. (Spain) **Francisco Clavet (champion)**
2. (Australia) Richard Fromberg (second round)
3. (Slovakia) Dominik Hrbatý (first round)
4. (Spain) Carlos Costa (second round)
5. (Australia) Andrew Ilie (first round)
6. (Ecuador) Nicolás Lapentti (second round)
7. (Argentina) Mariano Puerta (first round)
8. (Spain) Julián Alonso (quarterfinals)

== Draw ==
=== Key ===
- Q = Qualifier
- WC = Wild card
- LL = Lucky loser
- Alt = Alternate
- ITF = ITF entry
- PR = Protected ranking
- SR = Special ranking
- SE = Special exempt
- JE = Junior exempt
- JR = Junior Accelerator Programme entrant
- CO = College Accelerator Programme entrant
- NG = Next Gen Accelerator Program entrant
- w/o = Walkover
- r = Retired
- d = Defaulted

=== Finals ===
Semifinals
1 | **(Spain) Francisco Clavet** | 3 | **6** | **6**
(Spain) Albert Portas | **6** | 0 | 2
**(France) Arnaud Di Pasquale** | **6** | 2 | **7**
(Romania) Adrian Voinea | 3 | **6** | 5

Final
1 | **(Spain) Francisco Clavet** | **6** | 4 | **7**
(France) Arnaud Di Pasquale | 2 | **6** | 5

=== Top half ===
First round
1 | **(Spain) F Clavet** | **6** | **7**
(Germany) C Vinck | 2 | 6^{2}
**(Romania) D Pescariu** | **6** | **6**
(Norway) C Ruud | 3 | 4
**(Spain) Á Calatrava** | **6** | 3 | 1
(Germany) O Gross | 3 | **6** | 1^{r}
8 | **(Spain) J Alonso** | 1
(Czech Republic) T Zíb | 0^{r}
4 | **(Spain) C Costa** | **6** | **7**
(France) S Grosjean | 2 | 5
**(Romania) A Pavel** | **6** | **6**
(Italy) F Maggi | 0 | 3
**(Spain) A Portas** | **6** | **6**
(Spain) J Sánchez | 3 | 3
**(Hungary) A Sávolt** | **6** | **6**
5 | (Australia) A Ilie | 0 | 2

Second round
1 | **(Spain) F Clavet** | 3 | **7** | **6**
(Romania) D Pescariu | **6** | 5 | 2
(Spain) Á Calatrava | 2 | **7** | 4
8 | **(Spain) J Alonso** | **6** | 6^{4} | **6**
4 | (Spain) C Costa | **7** | 3 | 1
**(Romania) A Pavel** | 6^{6} | **6** | **6**
**(Spain) A Portas** | 4 | **7** | **6**
(Hungary) A Sávolt | **6** | 6^{3} | 2

Quarterfinals
1 | **(Spain) F Clavet** | **7** | **6**
8 | (Spain) J Alonso | 5 | 0
(Romania) A Pavel | **6** | 3 | 5
**(Spain) A Portas** | 2 | **6** | **7**

Semifinals
1 | **(Spain) F Clavet** | 3 | **6** | **6**
(Spain) A Portas | **6** | 0 | 2

=== Bottom half ===
First round
6 | **(Ecuador) N Lapentti** | **6** | **6**
(Sweden) J Apell | 3 | 4
**(France) A Di Pasquale** | **7** | **7**
(Romania) G Trifu | 6^{1} | 6^{5}
**(Spain) J Díaz** | **6** | **6**
(Germany) B Karbacher | 1 | 3
**(Spain) G Blanco** | **7** | **7**
3 | (Slovakia) D Hrbatý | 6^{6} | 5
**(Romania) I Moldovan** | **6** | **6**
7 | (Argentina) M Puerta | 4 | 4
**(Romania) A Voinea** | **6** | **6**
(Costa Rica) JA Marín | 4 | 3
**(Spain) E Benfele Álvarez** | **6** | **6**
(Greece) N Rovas | 3 | 2
2 | **(Australia) R Fromberg** | 6^{4} | **6** | **6**
(Romania) R Sabău | **7** | 1 | 3

Second round
6 | (Ecuador) N Lapentti | 2 | **7** | 1
**(France) A Di Pasquale** | **6** | 6^{7} | **6**
(Spain) J Díaz | 4 | 2
**(Spain) G Blanco** | **6** | **6**
(Romania) I Moldovan | 3 | 4
**(Romania) A Voinea** | **6** | **6**
**(Spain) E Benfele Álvarez** | **7** | 3 | **7**
2 | (Australia) R Fromberg | 6^{4} | **6** | 5

Quarterfinals
**(France) A Di Pasquale** | **7** | 2 | **6**
(Spain) G Blanco | 6^{2} | **6** | 2
**(Romania) A Voinea** | **6** | **6**
(Spain) E Benfele Álvarez | 4 | 1

Semifinals
**(France) A Di Pasquale** | **6** | 2 | **7**
(Romania) A Voinea | 3 | **6** | 5
