= 1999 Connex Open Romania – Singles =

Singles
- 1999 Connex Open Romania

Final
- Champion: (Spain) Alberto Martín
- Runner-up: (Morocco) Karim Alami
- Score: 6–2, 6–3

Details
- Draw: 32 (3WC/4Q)
- Seeds: 8

Events
Singles	Doubles
← 1998 ·	Romanian Open	· 2000 →

Francisco Clavet was the defending champion, but lost in the first round to Alberto Berasategui.

Alberto Martín won the title by defeating Karim Alami 6–2, 6–3 in the final.

== Seeds ==
1. (Spain) Àlex Corretja (quarterfinals)
2. (Morocco) Younes El Aynaoui (quarterfinals)
3. (Spain) Albert Costa (semifinals)
4. (Argentina) Mariano Zabaleta (first round, retired)
5. (Spain) Francisco Clavet (first round)
6. (Morocco) Hicham Arazi (second round)
7. (Austria) Stefan Koubek (first round)
8. (Spain) Fernando Vicente (second round)

== Draw ==
=== Key ===
- Q = Qualifier
- WC = Wild card
- LL = Lucky loser
- Alt = Alternate
- SE = Special exempt
- PR = Protected ranking
- ITF = ITF entry
- JE = Junior exempt
- w/o = Walkover
- r = Retired
- d = Defaulted
- SR = Special ranking

=== Finals ===
Semifinals
(Morocco) Karim Alami	6	3	6
(Spain) Alberto Berasategui	4	6	3
3	(Spain) Albert Costa	6^{6}	3
(Spain) Alberto Martín	7^{8}	6

Final
(Morocco) Karim Alami	2	3
(Spain) Alberto Martín	6	6

=== Top half ===
First round
1	(Spain) À Corretja	6	1	7^{7}
(Argentina) G Cañas	3	6	6^{3}
(Germany) J Knippschild	6	6
WC	(Romania) D Pescariu	4	4
(Spain) JC Ferrero	6	6
Q	(Austria) T Schiessling	3	3
(Morocco) K Alami	6	6
7	(Austria) S Koubek	2	1
4	(Argentina) M Zabaleta	2	7^{7}	1^{r}
(Argentina) G Gaudio	6	6^{5}	3
(Argentina) M Puerta	6	1	3
(Costa Rica) JA Marín	3	6	6
Q	(Spain) E Benfele Álvarez	4	3
Q	(France) JR Lisnard	6	6
(Spain) A Berasategui	3	6	7
5	(Spain) F Clavet	6	4	5

Second round
1	(Spain) À Corretja	6	6^{11}	6
(Germany) J Knippschild	4	7^{13}	4
(Spain) JC Ferrero	2	1
(Morocco) K Alami	6	6
(Argentina) G Gaudio	6	5	1
(Costa Rica) JA Marín	3	7	6
Q	(France) JR Lisnard	6	6^{3}	1
(Spain) A Berasategui	2	7^{7}	6

Quarterfinals
1	(Spain) À Corretja	6	3	6^{1}
(Morocco) K Alami	1	6	7^{7}
(Costa Rica) JA Marín	6	3	4
(Spain) A Berasategui	3	6	6

Semifinals
(Morocco) K Alami	6	3	6
(Spain) A Berasategui	4	6	3

=== Bottom half ===
First round
6/WC	(Morocco) H Arazi	7^{7}	6
(Romania) A Pavel	6^{5}	3
(Austria) M Hipfl	1	6	0
(Armenia) S Sargsian	6	0	6
(Spain) G Blanco	6	6
(France) A Di Pasquale	2	4
(Uruguay) M Filippini	3	6	4
3	(Spain) A Costa	6	0	6
8	(Spain) F Vicente	6	6
(Argentina) F Squillari	4	0
(Spain) A Martín	3	6	7
WC	(Romania) A Voinea	6	4	5
(Australia) A Ilie	7	4	6
Q	(Czech Republic) D Miketa	5	6	3
(Spain) A Portas	5	6^{4}
2	(Morocco) Y El Aynaoui	7	7^{7}

Second round
6/WC	(Morocco) H Arazi	4	4
(Armenia) S Sargsian	6	6
(Spain) G Blanco	4	6	3
3	(Spain) A Costa	6	4	6
8	(Spain) F Vicente	6	0	4
(Spain) A Martín	2	6	6
(Australia) A Ilie	4	2
2	(Morocco) Y El Aynaoui	6	6

Quarterfinals
(Armenia) S Sargsian	2	6	1
3	(Spain) A Costa	6	1	6
(Spain) A Martín	6	6
2	(Morocco) Y El Aynaoui	3	4

Semifinals
3	(Spain) A Costa	6^{6}	3
(Spain) A Martín	7^{8}	6
