= 1997 Romanian Open – Singles =

Tennis tournament

Singles
- 1997 Romanian Open

Final
- Champion: (Australia) Richard Fromberg
- Runner-up: (Italy) Andrea Gaudenzi
- Score: 6–1, 7–6^{(7–2)}

Details
- Draw: 32 (3WC/4Q/1LL)
- Seeds: 8

Events
Singles	Doubles
← 1996 ·	Romanian Open	· 1998 →

Alberto Berasategui was the defending champion, but lost in the second round to Nicolás Lapentti.

Richard Fromberg won the title by defeating Andrea Gaudenzi 6–1, 7–6^{(7–2)} in the final.

== Seeds ==
1. (Spain) Carlos Moyá (second round)
2. (Spain) Àlex Corretja (second round)
3. (Spain) Alberto Berasategui (second round)
4. (Spain) Albert Portas (quarterfinals)
5. (Morocco) Hicham Arazi (first round)
6. (Uruguay) Marcelo Filippini (first round)
7. (Germany) Marc-Kevin Goellner (semifinals)
8. (Morocco) Karim Alami (first round)

== Draw ==
=== Key ===
- Q = Qualifier
- WC = Wild card
- LL = Lucky loser
- Alt = Alternate
- ITF = ITF entry
- PR = Protected ranking
- SR = Special ranking
- SE = Special exempt
- JE = Junior exempt
- JR = Junior Accelerator Programme entrant
- CO = College Accelerator Programme entrant
- NG = Next Gen Accelerator Program entrant
- w/o = Walkover
- r = Retired
- d = Defaulted

=== Finals ===
Semifinals
7	(Germany) Marc-Kevin Goellner	2	6^{4}
(Italy) Andrea Gaudenzi	6	7^{7}
(Australia) Richard Fromberg	4	6	6
(Spain) Francisco Clavet	6	3	4

Final
(Italy) Andrea Gaudenzi	1	6^{2}
(Australia) Richard Fromberg	6	7^{7}

=== Top half ===
First round
1/WC	(Spain) C Moyá	6	4	6
(Germany) H Dreekmann	1	6	3
(Spain) C Costa	7^{9}	6
WC	(Romania) I Moldovan	6^{7}	3
Q	(Spain) F Vicente	6^{3}	5
(Norway) C Ruud	7^{7}	7
(Spain) JA Viloca	3	3
7	(Germany) MK Goellner	6	6
3	(Spain) A Berasategui	6	1	7^{9}
(Romania) D Pescariu	3	6	6^{7}
(Ecuador) N Lapentti	6	6
(Spain) E Benfele Álvarez	4	3
(Italy) A Gaudenzi	6	6
(Spain) A Alonso	1	4
(Costa Rica) JA Marín	6	6
6	(Uruguay) M Filippini	2	3

Second round
1/WC	(Spain) C Moyá	0	6	4
(Spain) C Costa	6	4	6
(Norway) C Ruud	2	7	2
7	(Germany) MK Goellner	6	5	6
3	(Spain) A Berasategui	6^{5}	3
(Ecuador) N Lapentti	7^{7}	6
(Italy) A Gaudenzi	6	7
(Costa Rica) JA Marín	4	5

Quarterfinals
(Spain) C Costa	2	6^{5}
7	(Germany) MK Goellner	6	7^{7}
(Ecuador) N Lapentti	2	4
(Italy) A Gaudenzi	6	6

Semifinals
7	(Germany) MK Goellner	2	6^{4}
(Italy) A Gaudenzi	6	7^{7}

=== Bottom half ===
First round
5	(Morocco) H Arazi	4	0
(Australia) R Fromberg	6	6
LL	(Spain) T Carbonell	6^{2}	1
(Romania) A Voinea	7^{7}	6
(Italy) D Sanguinetti	6	7^{10}
Q	(Bulgaria) O Stanoytchev	4	6^{8}
Q	(Spain) A Martín	6	6^{5}	4
4	(Spain) A Portas	4	7^{7}	6
8	(Morocco) K Alami	3	3
(Spain) F Clavet	6	6
(Romania) A Pavel	2	2
Q	(Germany) T Behrend	6	6
(Spain) J Sánchez	6	6
(Spain) G Blanco	4	1
(United States) J Tarango	4	1
2/WC	(Spain) À Corretja	6	6

Second round
(Australia) R Fromberg	7	6
(Romania) A Voinea	5	3
(Italy) D Sanguinetti	4	3
4	(Spain) A Portas	6	6
(Spain) F Clavet	7^{7}	6
Q	(Germany) T Behrend	6^{5}	4
(Spain) J Sánchez	6	4	7
2/WC	(Spain) À Corretja	3	6	5

Quarterfinals
(Australia) R Fromberg	6	6
4	(Spain) A Portas	4	3
(Spain) F Clavet	4	6	6
(Spain) J Sánchez	6	2	3

Semifinals
(Australia) R Fromberg	4	6	6
(Spain) F Clavet	6	3	4
