= 1996 Romanian Open – Singles =

Singles
- 1996 Open Romania

Final
- Champion: (Spain) Alberto Berasategui
- Runner-up: (Spain) Carlos Moyá
- Score: 6–1, 7–6^{(7–5)}

Details
- Draw: 32
- Seeds: 8

Events
Singles	Doubles
← 1995 ·	Open Romania	· 1997 →

Thomas Muster was the defending champion but did not compete that year.

Alberto Berasategui won in the final 6–1, 7–6^{(7–5)} against Carlos Moyá.

== Seeds ==
A champion seed is indicated in bold text while text in italics indicates the round in which that seed was eliminated.

1. (Germany) Boris Becker (first round)
2. n/a
3. (Spain) Carlos Moyá (final)
4. (Spain) **Alberto Berasategui (champion)**
5. (Spain) Francisco Clavet (quarterfinals)
6. n/a
7. (Austria) Gilbert Schaller (second round)
8. (Czech Republic) Jiří Novák (quarterfinals)

== Draw ==
=== Key ===
- Q = Qualifier
- WC = Wild card
- LL = Lucky loser
- Alt = Alternate
- ITF = ITF entry
- PR = Protected ranking
- SR = Special ranking
- SE = Special exempt
- JE = Junior exempt
- JR = Junior Accelerator Programme entrant
- CO = College Accelerator Programme entrant
- NG = Next Gen Accelerator Program entrant
- w/o = Walkover
- r = Retired
- d = Defaulted

First round
WC/1	(Germany) B Becker	3	r
(Norway) **C Ruud**	**5**
(Sweden) **T Johansson**	**6**	**6**
LL	(Romania) G Trifu	4	2
(Spain) J Burillo	2	2
WC	(Romania) **D Pescariu**	**6**	**6**
(Spain) M A Gorriz	1	**6**	2
7	(Austria) **G Schaller**	**6**	4	**6**
4	(Spain) **A Berasategui**	**4**
(Belgium) K Goossens	0	r
(Belgium) F Dewulf	5	**7**	6^{6}
(Australia) **R Fromberg**	**7**	5	**7^{8}**
(United States) J Tarango	4	**6**	0
Q	(Romania) **I Moldovan**	**6**	2	**6**
(Hungary) S Noszály	**6**	3	3
LL	(Argentina) **S Prieto**	4	**6**	**6**
5	(Spain) **F Clavet**	**6**	**6**
(Morocco) K Alami	4	3
(Spain) **G Blanco**	**6**	**7^{7}**
Q	(Australia) J Sekulov	2	6^{0}
(Morocco) H Arazi	2	**6**	1
LL	(Argentina) **A Zingman**	**6**	4	**6**
Q	(Spain) F Vicente	6^{5}	**7**	3
3	(Spain) **C Moyá**	**7^{7}**	5	**6**
8	(Czech Republic) **J Novák**	5	**6**	**7^{7}**
(Spain) T Carbonell	**7**	3	6^{4}
(France) **L Roux**	**7**	0	**6**
Q	(Russia) A Merinov	5	**6**	1
(Belgium) **J van Herck**	**6**	**6**
(Hungary) J Krocsko	3	0
WC	(Romania) **A Pavel**	**6**	**6**
LL	(South Africa) D Adams	2	0

Second round
(Norway) **C Ruud**	**6**	**6**
(Sweden) T Johansson	4	1
WC	(Romania) **D Pescariu**	4	**6**	**6**
7	(Austria) G Schaller	**6**	4	2
4	(Spain) **A Berasategui**	**6**	**6**
(Australia) R Fromberg	4	4
Q	(Romania) **I Moldovan**	4	**6**	**6**
LL	(Argentina) S Prieto	**6**	3	2
5	(Spain) **F Clavet**	**6**	**6**
(Spain) G Blanco	3	2
LL	(Argentina) A Zingman	2	3
3	(Spain) **C Moyá**	**6**	**6**
8	(Czech Republic) **J Novák**	**6**	**7^{7}**
(France) L Roux	4	6^{3}
(Belgium) J van Herck	2	2
WC	(Romania) **A Pavel**	**6**	**6**

Quarterfinals
(Norway) **C Ruud**	**6**	**7**
WC	(Romania) D Pescariu	2	5
4	(Spain) **A Berasategui**	**6**	**6**
Q	(Romania) I Moldovan	4	2
5	(Spain) F Clavet	2	3
3	(Spain) **C Moyá**	**6**	**6**
8	(Czech Republic) J Novák	3	2
WC	(Romania) **A Pavel**	**6**	**6**

Semifinals
(Norway) C Ruud	0	5
4	(Spain) **A Berasategui**	**6**	**7**
3	(Spain) **C Moyá**	4	**6**	**6**
WC	(Romania) A Pavel	**6**	3	0

Final
4	(Spain) **A Berasategui**	**6**	**7^{7}**
3	(Spain) Carlos Moyá	1	6^{5}
