= 1997 Romanian Open =

- Date: 13–19 September
- Edition: 5th
- Category: World Series
- Draw: 32S / 16D
- Prize money: $475,000
- Surface: Clay / outdoor
- Location: Bucharest, Romania

Champions

Singles
- (Australia) Richard Fromberg

Doubles
- (Argentina) Luis Lobo / (Spain) Javier Sánchez
← 1996 ·	Romanian Open	· 1998 →

The 1997 Romanian Open was an ATP men's tennis tournament held on outdoor clay courts in Bucharest, Romania that was part of the World Series of the 1997 ATP Tour. It was the fifth edition of the tournament and was held from 22 September through 29 September 1993. Unseeded Richard Fromberg won the singles title.

== Finals ==
=== Singles ===
(Australia) Richard Fromberg defeated (Italy) Andrea Gaudenzi 6–1, 7–6^{(7–2)}

- It was Fromberg's only singles title of the year and the 4th and last of his career.

=== Doubles ===
(Argentina) Luis Lobo / (Spain) Javier Sánchez defeated (Netherlands) Hendrik Jan Davids / (Argentina) Daniel Orsanic 7–5, 7–5
