= 1993 Romanian Open =

- Date: 13–19 September
- Edition: 1st
- Category: World Series
- Draw: 32S / 16D
- Prize money: $500,000
- Surface: Clay / outdoor
- Location: Bucharest, Romania

Champions

Singles
- (Croatia) Goran Ivanišević

Doubles
- (Netherlands) Menno Oosting / (Belgium) Libor Pimek
Romanian Open	· 1994 →

The 1993 Romanian Open was a men's tennis tournament held on outdoor clay courts in Bucharest, Romania that was part of the World Series of the 1993 ATP Tour . It was the inaugural edition of the tournament and was held from 13 September through 19 September 1993. Top-seeded Goran Ivanišević won the singles title and earned $71,000 first-prize money.

== Finals ==
=== Singles ===
(Croatia) Goran Ivanišević defeated (Russia) Andrei Cherkasov 6–2,7–6^{(7–5)}

- It was Ivanišević's 1st singles title of the year and the 7th of his career.

=== Doubles ===
(Netherlands) Menno Oosting / (Belgium) Libor Pimek defeated (Romania) George Cosac / (Romania) Ciprian Petre Porumb 7–6, 7–6
