= 1993 Romanian Open – Doubles =

Doubles
- 1993 Romanian Open

Final
- Champions: (Netherlands) Menno Oosting (Belgium) Libor Pimek
- Runners-up: (Romania) George Cosac (Romania) Ciprian Petre Porumb
- Score: 7–6, 7–6

Details
- Draw: 16 (1WC/1Q)
- Seeds: 4

Events
Singles	Doubles
Romanian Open	· 1994 →

In the first edition of the tournament, Menno Oosting and Libor Pimek won the title by defeating George Cosac and Ciprian Petre Porumb 7–6, 7–6 in the final.

== Seeds ==
1. (Netherlands) Menno Oosting / (Belgium) Libor Pimek (champions)
2. (United States) Mike Bauer / (Argentina) Horacio de la Peña (first round)
3. (United States) Donald Johnson / (United States) Kent Kinnear (first round)
4. (Sweden) Ronnie Båthman / (Czech Republic) Vojtěch Flégl (first round)

== Draw ==
=== Key ===
- Q = Qualifier
- WC = Wild card
- LL = Lucky loser
- Alt = Alternate
- SE = Special exempt
- PR = Protected ranking
- ITF = ITF entry
- JE = Junior exempt
- w/o = Walkover
- r = Retired
- d = Defaulted
- SR = Special ranking

=== Draw ===
First round
1	(Netherlands) M Oosting (Belgium) L Pimek	3	7	7
(Italy) C Brandi (Italy) A Gaudenzi	6	5	5
(Australia) J Ireland (United States) J Yancey	3	3
(Argentina) J Garat (Argentina) R Saad	6	6
3	(United States) D Johnson (United States) K Kinnear	6	4	6
(Latvia) Ģ Dzelde (Finland) O Rahnasto	3	6	7
Q	(Czech Republic) T Krupa (Czech Republic) P Vízner	7	3	6
(Spain) J Arrese (Spain) F Roig	6	6	3
(Romania) D Pescariu (Austria) H Skoff	6	6
(Sweden) J Donar (Sweden) O Jonsson	4	4
WC	(Romania) G Cosac (Romania) CP Porumb	6	6
4	(Sweden) R Båthman (Czech Republic) V Flégl	4	1
(Sweden) N Holm (Sweden) N Utgren	1	6	6
(Sweden) C Allgårdh (Sweden) T Nydahl	6	4	7
(Netherlands) M Schapers (Czech Republic) D Vacek	7	6
2	(United States) M Bauer (Argentina) H de la Peña	6	4

Quarterfinals
1	(Netherlands) M Oosting (Belgium) L Pimek	6	1	7
(Argentina) J Garat (Argentina) R Saad	4	6	6
(Latvia) Ģ Dzelde (Finland) O Rahnasto	2	6	1
Q	(Czech Republic) T Krupa (Czech Republic) P Vízner	6	4	6
(Romania) D Pescariu (Austria) H Skoff	6	2
WC	(Romania) G Cosac (Romania) CP Porumb	7	6
(Sweden) C Allgårdh (Sweden) T Nydahl	6	6	3
(Netherlands) M Schapers (Czech Republic) D Vacek	7	4	6

Semifinals
1	(Netherlands) M Oosting (Belgium) L Pimek	4	7	6
Q	(Czech Republic) T Krupa (Czech Republic) P Vízner	6	5	2
WC	(Romania) G Cosac (Romania) CP Porumb	3	6	7
(Netherlands) M Schapers (Czech Republic) D Vacek	6	3	6

Final
1	(Netherlands) M Oosting (Belgium) L Pimek	7	7
WC	(Romania) G Cosac (Romania) CP Porumb	6	6
