= 1993 Romanian Open – Singles =

Singles
- 1993 Romanian Open

Final
- Champion: (Croatia) Goran Ivanišević
- Runner-up: (Russia) Andrei Cherkasov
- Score: 6–2, 7–6^{(7–5)}

Details
- Draw: 32 (3WC/4Q/1LL)
- Seeds: 8

Events
Singles	Doubles
Romanian Open	· 1994 →

In the first edition of the tournament, Goran Ivanišević won the title by defeating Andrei Cherkasov 6–2, 7–6^{(7–5)} in the final.

== Seeds ==
1. (Croatia) Goran Ivanišević (champion)
2. (Austria) Thomas Muster (second round)
3. (France) Cédric Pioline (second round)
4. (Czech Republic) Karel Nováček (second round)
5. (Sweden) Magnus Gustafsson (quarterfinals)
6. (South Africa) Marcos Ondruska (second round)
7. (Germany) Bernd Karbacher (first round)
8. (Russia) Andrei Cherkasov (final)

== Draw ==
=== Key ===
- Q = Qualifier
- WC = Wild card
- LL = Lucky loser
- Alt = Alternate
- SE = Special exempt
- PR = Protected ranking
- ITF = ITF entry
- JE = Junior exempt
- w/o = Walkover
- r = Retired
- d = Defaulted
- SR = Special ranking

=== Finals ===
Semifinals
1/WC	(Croatia) Goran Ivanišević	6	6
(Argentina) Guillermo Pérez Roldán	4	4
(Italy) Andrea Gaudenzi	4	6	1
8	(Russia) Andrei Cherkasov	6	3	6

Final
1/WC	(Croatia) Goran Ivanišević	6	7^{7}
8	(Russia) Andrei Cherkasov	2	6^{5}

=== Top half ===
First round
1/WC	(Croatia) G Ivanišević	7^{7}	6
(Austria) H Skoff	6^{3}	3
(Uruguay) M Filippini	6	6
Q	(Romania) CP Porumb	2	4
(Czech Republic) S Doseděl	6	6
(Spain) JF Altur	2	4
WC	(Romania) D Pescariu	6	7^{7}
7	(Germany) B Karbacher	4	6^{2}
4	(Czech Republic) K Nováček	2	7^{7}	6
(Morocco) Y El Aynaoui	6	6^{5}	4
(Argentina) G Pérez Roldán	7^{12}	7^{7}
(Czech Republic) D Rikl	6^{10}	6^{4}
(Argentina) H de la Peña	7	1	6^{7}
(Spain) J Arrese	5	6	7^{9}
(Germany) C Arriens	4	2
5	(Sweden) M Gustafsson	6	6

Second round
1/WC	(Croatia) G Ivanišević	7^{7}	6
(Uruguay) M Filippini	6^{3}	2
(Czech Republic) S Doseděl
WC	(Romania) D Pescariu	w/o
4	(Czech Republic) K Nováček	6	4	2
(Argentina) G Pérez Roldán	4	6	6
(Spain) J Arrese	7^{7}	6^{5}	4
5	(Sweden) M Gustafsson	6^{2}	7^{7}	6

Quarterfinals
1/WC	(Croatia) G Ivanišević	6	7^{7}
WC	(Romania) D Pescariu	1	6^{4}
(Argentina) G Pérez Roldán	7^{7}	6
5	(Sweden) M Gustafsson	6^{3}	0

Semifinals
1/WC	(Croatia) G Ivanišević	6	6
(Argentina) G Pérez Roldán	4	4

=== Bottom half ===
First round
6	(South Africa) M Ondruska	6	6
WC	(Romania) R Sabău	1	3
(Czech Republic) D Vacek	2	4
(Spain) F Clavet	6	6
(Spain) M Górriz	4	2
(Italy) A Gaudenzi	6	6
(Germany) P Kühnen	4	2
3	(France) C Pioline	6	6
8	(Russia) A Cherkasov	6	6
Q	(Sweden) M Tillström	3	0
(Italy) R Furlan	6	7^{8}
Q	(France) F Fontang	4	6^{6}
(Argentina) R Azar	1	5
LL	(Sweden) T Nydahl	6	7
Q	(Croatia) I Šarić	3	7^{7}	2
2	(Austria) T Muster	6	6^{4}	6

Second round
6	(South Africa) M Ondruska	1	4
(Spain) F Clavet	6	6
(Italy) A Gaudenzi	6	3	6
3	(France) C Pioline	3	6	2
8	(Russia) A Cherkasov	6	6
(Italy) R Furlan	3	3
LL	(Sweden) T Nydahl	6	7^{7}
2	(Austria) T Muster	2	6^{4}

Quarterfinals
(Spain) F Clavet	3	6	5
(Italy) A Gaudenzi	6	4	7
8	(Russia) A Cherkasov	1	6	6
LL	(Sweden) T Nydahl	6	4	2

Semifinals
(Italy) A Gaudenzi	4	6	1
8	(Russia) A Cherkasov	6	3	6
