= 1998 Romanian Open – Doubles =

Doubles
- 1998 Romanian Open

Final
- Champions: (Romania) Andrei Pavel (Romania) Gabriel Trifu
- Runners-up: (Romania) George Cosac (Romania) Dinu Pescariu
- Score: 7–6, 7–6

Events
| Singles | Doubles |
| ← 1997 · | Romanian Open | · 1999 → |

The 1998 Romanian Open was a men's tennis tournament played on Clay in Bucharest, Romania that was part of the International Series of the 1998 ATP Tour. It was the sixth edition of the tournament and was held from 14 September – 21 September.

== Seeds ==
Champion seeds are indicated in bold text while text in italics indicates the round in which those seeds were eliminated.

1. (Spain) Julián Alonso / (Spain) Javier Sánchez (first round)
2. (Netherlands) Tom Kempers / (Netherlands) Menno Oosting (semifinals)
3. (United States) Kent Kinnear / (North Macedonia) Aleksandar Kitinov (first round)
4. (Socialist Federal Republic of Yugoslavia) Nebojsa Djordjevic / (Czech Republic) Libor Pimek (semifinals)

== Draw ==
=== Key ===
- Q = Qualifier
- WC = Wild card
- LL = Lucky loser
- Alt = Alternate
- ITF = ITF entry
- PR = Protected ranking
- SR = Special ranking
- SE = Special exempt
- JE = Junior exempt
- JR = Junior Accelerator Programme entrant
- CO = College Accelerator Programme entrant
- NG = Next Gen Accelerator Program entrant
- w/o = Walkover
- r = Retired
- d = Defaulted

=== Finals ===
First round
(Spain) **Á Calatrava** **(Spain) A Portas** | **7** | **6**
1 | (Spain) J Alonso (Spain) J Sánchez | 6 | 2
(Romania) **A Pavel** **(Romania) G Trifu** | **6** | **6**
(Italy) G Castrichella (Italy) F Maggi | 1 | 2
4 | (Socialist Federal Republic of Yugoslavia) **N Djordjevic** **(Czech Republic) L Pimek** | **6** | **6**
(Romania) M Calugaru (Romania) R Farcas | 4 | 4
(Spain) **E Benfele Álvarez** **(Argentina) M Puerta** | **6** | **6**
(Australia) A Ilie (Romania) R Sabău | 2 | 4
(Hungary) **A Sávolt** **(Japan) T Shimada** | **6** | **6**
(Sweden) J Apell (Germany) B Karbacher | 3 | 0
(Romania) **G Cosac** **(Romania) D Pescariu** | **6** | **6**
3 | (United States) K Kinnear (North Macedonia) A Kitinov | 1 | 3
(Romania) **I Moldovan** **(Romania) A Voinea** | **6** | **6**
(South Africa) L Bale (South Africa) M Wakefield | 4 | 3
2 | (Netherlands) **T Kempers** **(Netherlands) M Oosting** | **6** | **7**
(Belgium) T Vanhoudt (Netherlands) F Wibier | 1 | 6

Quarterfinals
(Spain) Á Calatrava (Spain) A Portas | 3 | 4
(Romania) **A Pavel** **(Romania) G Trifu** | **6** | **6**
4 | (Socialist Federal Republic of Yugoslavia) **N Djordjevic** **(Czech Republic) L Pimek** | 5 | **6** | **6**
(Spain) E Benfele Álvarez (Argentina) M Puerta | **7** | 4 | 1
(Hungary) A Sávolt (Japan) T Shimada | 3 | 5
(Romania) **G Cosac** **(Romania) D Pescariu** | **6** | **7**
(Romania) I Moldovan (Romania) A Voinea | 1 | **6** | 2
2 | (Netherlands) **T Kempers** **(Netherlands) M Oosting** | **6** | 4 | **6**

Semifinals
(Romania) **A Pavel** **(Romania) G Trifu** | **6** | **6**
4 | (Socialist Federal Republic of Yugoslavia) N Djordjevic (Czech Republic) L Pimek | 2 | 3
(Romania) **G Cosac** **(Romania) D Pescariu** | 5 | **6** | **6**
2 | (Netherlands) T Kempers (Netherlands) M Oosting | **7** | 2 | 3

Final
(Romania) **A Pavel** **(Romania) G Trifu** | **7** | 4 | **7**
(Romania) G Cosac (Romania) D Pescariu | 6 | **6** | 6
