= 1994 Romanian Open – Singles =

Singles
- 1994 Romanian Open

Final
- Champion: (Argentina) Franco Davín
- Runner-up: (Croatia) Goran Ivanišević
- Score: 6–2, 6–4

Details
- Draw: 32 (2WC/4Q/1LL)
- Seeds: 8

Events
Singles	Doubles
← 1993 ·	Romanian Open	· 1995 →

Goran Ivanišević was the defending champion, but lost in the final to Franco Davín. The score was 6–2, 6–4.

== Seeds ==
1. (Croatia) Goran Ivanišević (final)
2. (Spain) Sergi Bruguera (first round)
3. (n/a)
4. (Spain) Alberto Berasategui (second round)
5. (Austria) Thomas Muster (quarterfinals, withdrew)
6. (Italy) Andrea Gaudenzi (first round)
7. (Czech Republic) Sláva Doseděl (second round)
8. (Spain) Àlex Corretja (quarterfinals)

== Draw ==
=== Key ===
- Q = Qualifier
- WC = Wild card
- LL = Lucky loser
- Alt = Alternate
- ITF = ITF entry
- PR = Protected ranking
- SR = Special ranking
- SE = Special exempt
- JE = Junior exempt
- JR = Junior Accelerator Programme entrant
- CO = College Accelerator Programme entrant
- NG = Next Gen Accelerator Program entrant
- w/o = Walkover
- r = Retired
- d = Defaulted

=== Finals ===
Semifinals
1	(Croatia) Goran Ivanišević	6	6
(Italy) Renzo Furlan	4	4
(Spain) Albert Costa	5	3
(Argentina) Franco Davín	7	6

Final
1	(Croatia) Goran Ivanišević	2	4
(Argentina) Franco Davín	6	6

=== Top half ===
First round
1	(Croatia) G Ivanišević	2	6	6
(Italy) P Canè	6	3	4
(Belgium) F Dewulf	3	0
(Spain) T Carbonell	6	6
WC	(Romania) A Pavel	7	3	7
(Spain) J Arrese	5	6	5
(Russia) A Cherkasov	3	3
8	(Spain) À Corretja	6	6
4	(Spain) A Berasategui	6	6
(Austria) G Schaller	2	1
(Italy) R Furlan	4	7	6
(Spain) F Clavet	6	5	0
Q	(Spain) F Roig	6	3	7
Q	(Portugal) B Mota	3	6	5
(Australia) S Youl	1	4
5	(Austria) T Muster	6	6

Second round
1	(Croatia) G Ivanišević	6	6
(Spain) T Carbonell	4	2
WC	(Romania) A Pavel	3	4
8	(Spain) À Corretja	6	6
4	(Spain) A Berasategui	6	3	4
(Italy) R Furlan	1	6	6
Q	(Spain) F Roig	0	6	1
5	(Austria) T Muster	6	1	6

Quarterfinals
1	(Croatia) G Ivanišević	3	6	6
8	(Spain) À Corretja	6	2	2
(Italy) R Furlan	w/o
5	(Austria) T Muster

Semifinals
1	(Croatia) G Ivanišević	6	6
(Italy) R Furlan	4	4

=== Bottom half ===
First round
6	(Italy) A Gaudenzi	3	4
(Spain) A Costa	6	6
(Sweden) T Nydahl	4	6	3
Q	(Germany) C Arriens	6	3	2^{r}
(Uruguay) M Filippini	6^{4}	1
Q	(Spain) M Górriz	7^{7}	6
(Spain) Ó Martínez	6	6
LL	(United States) M Blackman	2	2
7	(Czech Republic) S Doseděl	4	6	6
WC	(Romania) R Sabău	6	3	4
(Austria) H Skoff	3	3
(Slovakia) K Kučera	6	6
(Australia) B Larkham	0	1
(Ukraine) D Poliakov	6	6
(Argentina) F Davín	7^{7}	3	6
2	(Spain) S Bruguera	6^{1}	6	3

Second round
(Spain) A Costa	6^{3}	6	1
(Sweden) T Nydahl	7^{7}	4	0^{r}
Q	(Spain) M Górriz	6	7^{7}
(Spain) Ó Martínez	1	6^{5}
7	(Czech Republic) S Doseděl	3	3
(Slovakia) K Kučera	6	6
(Ukraine) D Poliakov	1	1
(Argentina) F Davín	6	6

Quarterfinals
(Spain) A Costa	6	6
Q	(Spain) M Górriz	3	4
(Slovakia) K Kučera	3	0
(Argentina) F Davín	6	6

Semifinals
(Spain) A Costa	5	3
(Argentina) F Davín	7	6
