= PEOPLEnet Cup =

Defunct tennis tournament
- Event name: Dnipropetrovsk
- Location: Dnipropetrovsk, Ukraine
- Category: ATP Challenger Tour, Tretorn SERIE+
- Surface: Hard (i)
- Draw: 32S/16Q/16D
- Prize money: $125,000

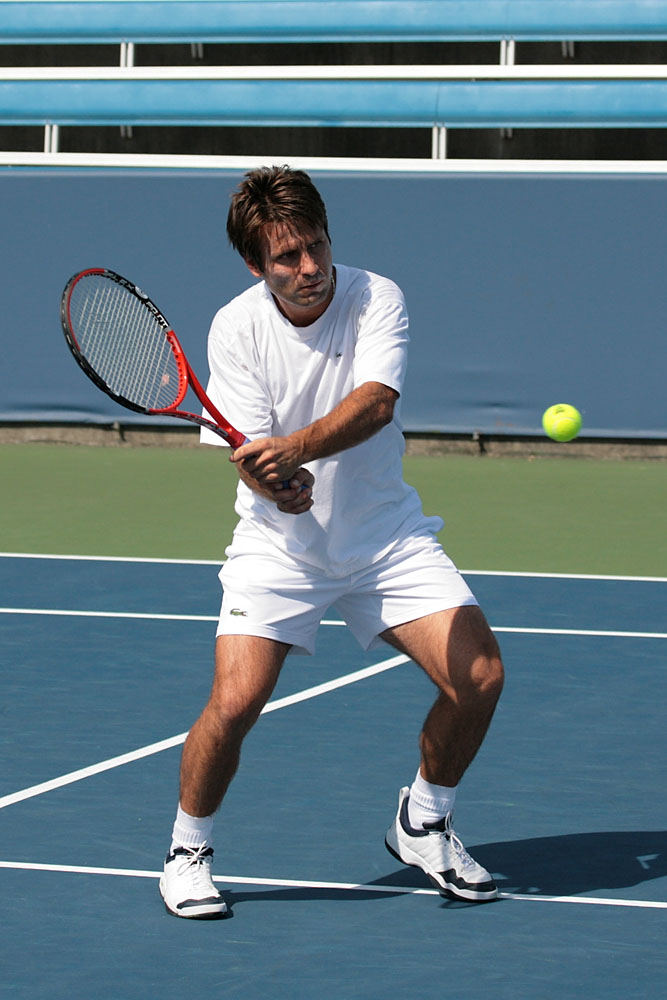
French veteran Fabrice Santoro titled in the Dnipropetrovsk singles in 2008

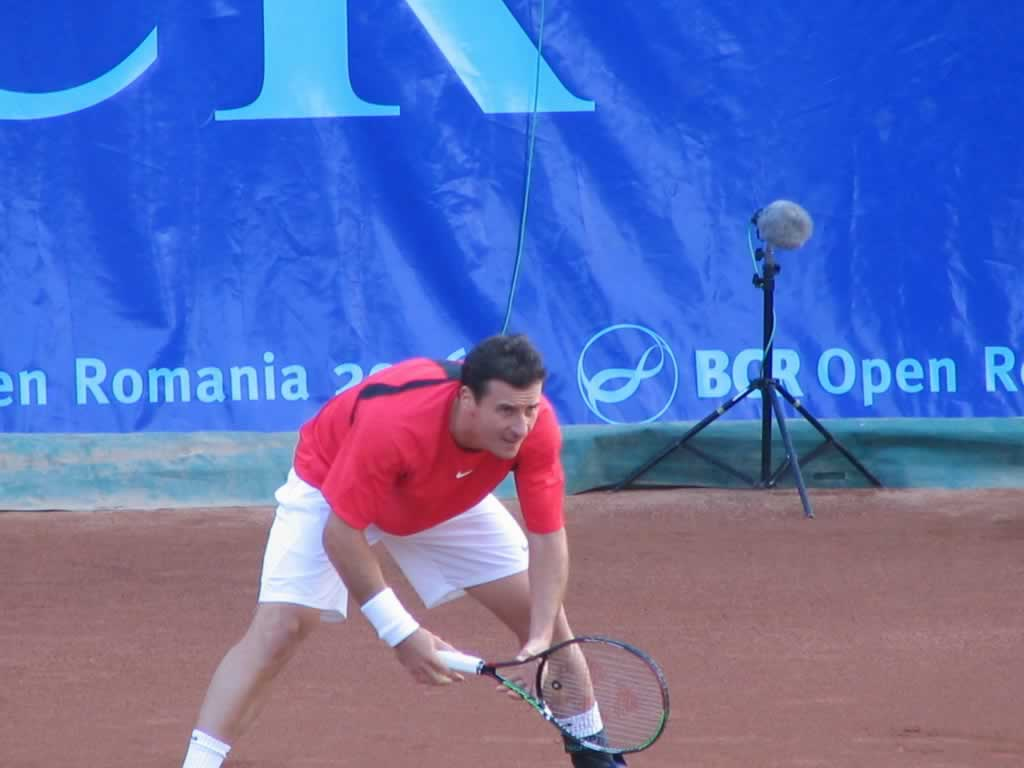
Romanian Andrei Pavel's 2004 singles victory came by walkover, after Karol Kucera's withdrawal from the final

The PEOPLEnet Cup was a professional tennis tournament played on indoor hardcourts. It was part of the Association of Tennis Professionals (ATP) Challenger Tour. It was held annually in Dnipropetrovsk, Ukraine, from 2003 until 2008.

== Past finals ==
=== Singles ===
Year	Champion	Runner-up	Score
2008	(France) Fabrice Santoro	(Romania) Victor Hanescu	6–2, 6–3
2007	(Germany) Mischa Zverev	(Russia) Dmitry Tursunov	6–4, 6–4
2006	(Russia) Dmitry Tursunov	(Germany) Benjamin Becker	7–6(7), 6–4
2005	(Belgium) Dick Norman	(Netherlands) Raemon Sluiter	7–6(2), 6–7(2), 6–3
2004	(Romania) Andrei Pavel	(Slovakia) Karol Kucera	walkover
2003	(Georgia (country)) Irakli Labadze	(Israel) Harel Levy	6–3, 3–6, 6–1

=== Doubles ===
Year	Champions	Runners-up	Score
2008	(Argentina) Guillermo Canas (Russia) Dmitry Tursunov	(Poland) Lukasz Kubot (Austria) Oliver Marach	6–3, 7–6(5)
2007	(Germany) Christopher Kas (Croatia) Lovro Zovko	(India) Rohan Bopanna (South Africa) Chris Haggard	7–6(5), 6–2
2006	(Ukraine) Sergiy Stakhovsky (Ukraine) Orest Tereshchuk	(Switzerland) Marco Chiudinelli (Croatia) Lovro Zovko	6–4, 6–0
2005	(Czech Republic) Lukas Dlouhy (Czech Republic) David Skoch	(Czech Republic) Tomas Cibulec (Croatia) Lovro Zovko	7–5, 6–4
2004	(Slovakia) Karol Beck (Czech Republic) Jaroslav Levinsky	(Romania) Andrei Pavel (Romania) Gabriel Trifu	6–7(4), 7–6(4), 7–6(2)
2003	(Israel) Jonathan Erlich (Israel) Harel Levy	(Sweden) Simon Aspelin (Sweden) Johan Landsberg	6–4, 6–3

== See also ==
- Dnipro Arena
