= 1994 Romanian Open =

- Date: 12–9 September
- Edition: 2nd
- Category: World Series
- Draw: 32S / 16D
- Prize money: $525,000
- Surface: Clay / outdoor
- Location: Bucharest, Romania

Champions

Singles
- (Argentina) Franco Davín

Doubles
- (Australia) Wayne Arthurs / (Australia) Simon Youl
← 1993 ·	Romanian Open	· 1995 →

The 1994 Romanian Open was an ATP men's tennis tournament held in Bucharest, Romania. It was the second edition of the tournament and was held from 12 September through 19 September 1994.

Unseeded Franco Davín won his first title of the year, and third of his career.

== Finals ==
=== Singles ===
(Argentina) Franco Davín defeated (Croatia) Goran Ivanišević 6–2, 6–4

- It was Davín's 1st singles title of the year and the 3rd and last of his career.

=== Doubles ===
(Australia) Wayne Arthurs / (Australia) Simon Youl defeated (Spain) Jordi Arrese / (Spain) José Antonio Conde 6–4, 6–4
