= Martin Blackman =

Barbadian-American tennis player

- Country (sports): United States / Barbados
- Residence: Orlando, Florida, U.S.
- Born: April 5, 1970 (age 56) The Bronx, New York, U.S.
- Height: 6 ft 2 in (1.88 m)
- Plays: Right-handed
- Prize money: $141,468

Singles
- Career record: 3–14
- Career titles: 3
- Highest ranking: No. 158 (June 6, 1994)

Grand Slam singles results
- French Open: 1R (1994)
- US Open: 1R (1990)

Doubles
- Career record: 4–7
- Career titles: 6
- Highest ranking: No. 142 (September 19, 1994)

Grand Slam doubles results
- US Open: 1R (1994)

Martin Blackman (born March 5, 1970) is a former professional tennis player from the United States. He later represented Barbados.

== Early life ==
Blackman was born in New York City, before moving to Barbados when he was two years old. He spent much of his childhood in Barbados, where his father Courtney Blackman served as Governor of the Central Bank and he attended the Harrison College School. For two summers, Blackman's family lived on the Upper West Side in New York and he trained at the Port Washington Tennis Academy. In 1983 he returned to the United States and attended the Nick Bollettieri Tennis Academy on a tennis scholarship.

== Junior career ==
Blackman beat future Grand Slam winners Michael Chang and Petr Korda en route to the semi-finals of the 1986 US Open Juniors and was also a semi-finalist at the same event a year later, with MaliVai Washington in the doubles. The biggest junior title that he won was the 1986 USTA National Championships (16s), in both the singles and doubles, partnering Chang. He was also a member of two NCAA Division I Championship winning teams while at Stanford.

== Professional career ==
Blackman started on the Grand Prix tennis circuit in 1987 when, at the age of just 16, he appeared at Indianapolis and achieved a win over world number 74 Luiz Mattar.

The right-handed Blackman made his first Grand Slam appearance in the 1990 US Open, where he lost a three set match to Martín Jaite in the first round.

In 1994 he played in his two further Grand Slams, at the French Open and US Open. At Roland Garros he was unable to better his previous effort and again exited in the opening round, this time to countryman Bryan Shelton in four sets. At his home event he only entered the main draw of the doubles, with Ivan Baron. The pair lost their only match to Canadians Daniel Nestor and Greg Rusedski. Also in 1994, Blackman and partner Renzo Furlan reached the semi-finals of the Romanian Open.

He appeared in 10 rubbers for the Barbados Davis Cup team during his career, winning his first five matches and losing his final five.

Blackman achieved a career-high singles ranking of No. 158 and No. 142 in men's doubles, and eventually retired from the ATP Tour in 1995.

== Coaching career ==
Blackman was head men's tennis coach at American University from 1998 to 2004, when he became Director of the Junior Tennis Champions Center at College Park, Maryland He was Senior Director of Talent Identification and Development for the United States Tennis Association (USTA) from 2009 to 2011, serving on the Board of Directors from 2003 to 2004 and 2005–06. He founded the Blackman Tennis Academy in Boca Raton, Florida in 2011. In 2015, Blackman re-joined the USTA, succeeding Patrick McEnroe as General Manager of Player Development.

== Personal life ==
Blackman holds an Economics Degree from George Washington University and from the prestigious school, Stanford University. He lives in Florida with his wife and their four children.

== Challenger titles ==
=== Singles ===
No.	Year	Tournament	Surface	Partner	Score
1.	1993	Belo Horizonte, Brazil	Hard	(South Africa) David Adams	6–7, 6–4, 7–6

=== Doubles ===
No.	Year	Tournament	Surface	Partner	Opponents	Score
1.	1992	Singapore	Hard	(Italy) Laurence Tieleman	(Germany) Patrick Baur (Netherlands) Sander Groen	6–4, 1–6, 7–6
2.	1994	Wellington, New Zealand	Hard	(United States) Kenny Thorne	(Australia) Sandon Stolle (Australia) Simon Youl	6–7, 6–3, 6–3
3.	1994	Poznań, Poland	Clay	(Chile) Sergio Cortés	(Portugal) João Cunha-Silva (Portugal) Emanuel Couto	6–7, 7–5, 7–5
