= 1999 Connex Open Romania =

- Date: 27 September – 3 October
- Edition: 7th
- Category: World Series
- Draw: 32S / 16D
- Prize money: $350,000
- Surface: Clay / outdoor
- Location: Bucharest, Romania

Champions

Singles
- (Spain) Alberto Martín

Doubles
- (Argentina) Lucas Arnold Ker / (Argentina) Martín García
← 1998 ·	Romanian Open	· 2000 →

The 1999 Connex Open Romania was an ATP men's tennis tournament played on outdoor clay courts in Bucharest, Romania that was part of the World Series of the 1999 ATP Tour. It was the 7th edition of the tournament and was held from 27 September through 3 October 1999. Unseeded Alberto Martín won the singles title.

== Finals ==
=== Singles ===
(Spain) Alberto Martín defeated (Morocco) Karim Alami 6–2, 6–3

- It was Martín's second singles title of the year and of his career.

=== Doubles ===
(Argentina) Lucas Arnold Ker / (Argentina) Martín García defeated (Germany) Marc-Kevin Goellner / (United States) Francisco Montana 6–3, 2–6, 6–3
