= Remus Farcas =

Romanian tennis player

- Country (sports): Romania
- Born: 11 December 1971 (age 53); Făgăraș, Romania
- Prize money: $25,267

Singles
- Career record: 0–1
- Highest ranking: No. 400 (14 Aug 2000)

Doubles
- Career record: 0–1
- Highest ranking: No. 702 (20 Jul 1992)

Remus Farcas (born 11 December 1971) is a Romanian former professional tennis player.

Farcas, born Făgăraș, was associated with the ICIM Brașov club and turned professional in 1990. During his career he reached a best singles world ranking of 400 and featured in his only ATP Tour singles main draw at the 1995 Romanian Open, losing in the first round to Andrew Ilie. He played in the doubles main draw of the 1998 Romanian Open.

== ITF Futures finals ==
=== Doubles: 1 (0–1) ===
Result	Date	Tournament	Surface	Partner	Opponents	Score
Loss	Jul 2001	Romania F3, Brașov	Clay	(Romania) Marius Calugaru	(Argentina) Roberto Álvarez (France) Jordane Doble	2–6, 6–2, 6–7^{(9)}
