= José Antonio Conde (tennis) =

Spanish tennis player (born 1970)

- Full name: José Antonio Conde
- Country (sports): Spain
- Born: 11 March 1970 (age 55); Barcelona, Spain
- Plays: Right-handed
- Prize money: $195,135

Singles
- Career record: 3–8
- Career titles: 0
- Highest ranking: No. 274 (22 March 1993)

Doubles
- Career record: 30–58
- Career titles: 0
- Highest ranking: No. 89 (11 September 1995)

Grand Slam doubles results
- Australian Open: 1R (1996)
- French Open: 2R (1995)
- Wimbledon: 3R (1996)
- US Open: 3R (1996)

José Antonio "Pepe" Conde (born 11 March 1970) is a former professional tennis player from Spain.

== Biography ==
Conde, who was born in Barcelona, made most of his main draw appearances on the ATP World Tour as a doubles player.

He and partner Jordi Arrese made the final of the doubles at the 1994 Romanian Open, which they lost to Wayne Arthurs and Simon Youl.

In 1995 he broke into the world's top 100 ranked doubles players and peaked at 89 in September.

He made the third round of both the 1996 Wimbledon Championships and 1996 US Open, both with Àlex Corretja.

== ATP Tour career finals ==
=== Doubles: 1 (0–1) ===
Result	W/L	Year	Tournament	Surface	Partner	Opponents	Score
Loss	0–1	Sep 1994	Bucharest, Romania	Clay	(Spain) Jordi Arrese	(Australia) Wayne Arthurs (Australia) Simon Youl	4–6, 4–6

== Challenger titles ==
=== Doubles: (2) ===
No.	Year	Tournament	Surface	Partner	Opponents	Score
1.	1996	Alicante, Spain	Clay	(Portugal) Nuno Marques	(Spain) Julián Alonso (Spain) Emilio Sánchez	6–4, 7–5
2.	1998	Barcelona, Spain	Clay	(Spain) Javier Sánchez	(Italy) Massimo Bertolini (Italy) Cristian Brandi	4–6, 6–4, 6–3
