= 1996 Romanian Open =

- Date: 9–15 September
- Edition: 4th
- Category: World Series
- Draw: 32S / 16D
- Prize money: $475,000
- Surface: Clay
- Location: Bucharest, Romania
- Venue: Arenele BNR

Champions

Singles
- (Spain) Alberto Berasategui

Doubles
- (Sweden) David Ekerot / (United States) Jeff Tarango
- Romanian Open

The 1996 Romanian Open was a men's tennis tournament played on outdoor clay courts at the Arenele BNR in Bucharest, Romania that was part of the World Series of the 1996 ATP Tour. It was the fourth edition of the tournament and was held from 9 September until 15 September 1996. Fourth-seeded Alberto Berasategui won the singles title.

== Finals ==
=== Singles ===
(Spain) Alberto Berasategui defeated (Spain) Carlos Moyá 6–1, 7–6^{(7–5)}

- It was Berasategui's third title of the year and the 12th of his career.

=== Doubles ===
(Sweden) David Ekerot / (United States) Jeff Tarango defeated (South Africa) David Adams / (Netherlands) Menno Oosting 7–6, 7–6

- It was Ekerot's second title of the year and of his career. It was Tarango's second title of the year and fifth of his career.
