= 1998 Romanian Open =

- Date: 14–21 September
- Edition: 6th
- Category: World Series
- Draw: 32S / 16D
- Prize money: $475,000
- Surface: Clay / outdoor
- Location: Bucharest, Romania

Champions

Singles
- (Spain) Francisco Clavet

Doubles
- (Romania) Andrei Pavel / (Romania) Gabriel Trifu
- Romanian Open

The 1998 Romanian Open was a men's tennis tournament played on Clay in Bucharest, Romania that was part of the World Series of the 1998 ATP Tour. It was the sixth edition of the tournament and was held from 14 September until 21 September 1997. First-seeded Francisco Clavet won the singles title.

== Finals ==
=== Singles ===
(Spain) Francisco Clavet defeated (France) Arnaud Di Pasquale, 6–4, 2–6, 7–5

- It was Clevet's 1st singles title of the year and the 6th of his career.

=== Doubles ===
(Romania) Andrei Pavel / (Romania) Gabriel Trifu defeated (Romania) George Cosac / (Romania) Dinu Pescariu, 7–6, 7–6
