= 1995 Romanian Open =

- Date: 11–18 September
- Edition: 3rd
- Category: ATP World Series
- Draw: 32S / 16D
- Prize money: $1,350,000
- Surface: Clay / outdoor
- Location: Bucharest, Romania

Champions

Singles
- (Austria) Thomas Muster

Doubles
- (United States) Mark Keil / (United States) Jeff Tarango
- Romanian Open

The 1995 BCR Open Romania was a men's tennis tournament held in Bucharest, Romania. The event was played on outdoor clay courts and was part of the ATP World Series of the 1995 ATP Tour. It was the third edition of the tournament and was held from 11 September through 18 September 1995. First-seeded Thomas Muster won the singles title.

== Finals ==
=== Singles ===
(Austria) Thomas Muster defeated (Austria) Gilbert Schaller 6–3, 6–4

- It was Muster's 11th singles title of the year and 34th of his career.

=== Doubles ===
(United States) Mark Keil / (United States) Jeff Tarango defeated (Czech Republic) Cyril Suk / (Czech Republic) Daniel Vacek 6–4, 7–6
