= Ciprian Petre Porumb =

Romanian tennis player

Ciprian Porumb
- Full name: Ciprian Petre Porumb
- Country (sports): Romania
- Born: 6 March 1971 (age 54); Cluj-Napoca, Romania
- Height: 1.96 m (6 ft 5 in)
- Plays: Right-handed
- Prize money: US$24,735

Singles
- Career record: 0–1
- Career titles: 0
- Highest ranking: No. 394 (4 May 1992)

Doubles
- Career record: 5–5
- Career titles: 0
- Highest ranking: No. 275 (20 September 1993)

Team competitions
- Davis Cup: 3–2

Ciprian Petre Porumb (born 6 March 1971) is a Romanian retired professional tennis player and current captain of the Romania Davis Cup Team. On 4 May 1992 he reached his highest ATP singles ranking of 394 whilst his highest doubles ranking was 275 achieved on 20 September 1993.

== ATP career finals ==
=== Doubles: 1 (0–1) ===
Legend Grand Slam Tournaments (0–0) ATP World Tour Finals (0–0) ATP World Tour Masters 1000 (0–0) ATP World Tour 500 Series (0–0) ATP World Tour 250 Series (0–1)	Finals by surface Hard (0–0) Clay (0–1) Grass (0–0) Carpet (0–0)

Result	W/L	Date	Tournament	Surface	Partner	Opponents	Score
Loss	0–1	Sep 1993	Bucharest, Romania	Clay	(Romania) George Cosac	(Netherlands) Menno Oosting (Belgium) Libor Pimek	6–7, 6–7
