= Gabriel Trifu =

Romanian tennis player

- Full name: Gabriel Bogdan Trifu
- Country (sports): Romania
- Residence: Bradenton, Florida, United States
- Born: 14 April 1975 (age 51) Bucharest, Romania
- Height: 1.93 m (6 ft 4 in)
- Turned pro: 1994
- Retired: 2005
- Plays: Right-handed
- Prize money: US$ 319,110

Singles
- Career record: 4–14
- Career titles: 0; 1 Challenger, 0 Futures
- Highest ranking: No. 148 (22 April 2002)

Grand Slam singles results
- Australian Open: Q2 (1998, 2003)
- French Open: Q3 (2002)
- Wimbledon: Q3 (1999)
- US Open: Q2 (1998, 1999)

Doubles
- Career record: 23–27
- Career titles: 1; 13 Challenger, 0 Futures
- Highest ranking: No. 97 (18 July 2005)

Grand Slam doubles results
- French Open: 1R (2002, 2010)
- Wimbledon: 2R (1999, 2002)
- US Open: 1R (2009)

Team competitions
- Davis Cup: 7–12
- Last updated on: 9 April 2022.

Gabriel Trifu (born 14 April 1975) is a Romanian tennis coach and former professional tennis player. In 1998, he won his first and only title on the ATP Tour, a doubles title at the Romanian Open with Andrei Pavel. Since 2017, Trifu has been the captain of the Romanian Davis Cup team.

== ATP career finals ==
=== Doubles: 1 (1 title) ===
Legend Grand Slam Tournaments (0–0) ATP World Tour Finals (0–0) ATP Masters Series (0–0) ATP Championship Series (0–0) ATP World Series (1–0)	Finals by surface Hard (0–0) Clay (1–0) Grass (0–0) Carpet (0–0)	Finals by setting Outdoors (1–0) Indoors (0–0)

Result	W–L	Date	Tournament	Tier	Surface	Partner	Opponents	Score
Win	1–0	Sep 1998	Bucharest, Romania	World Series	Clay	(Romania) Andrei Pavel	(Romania) George Cosac (Romania) Dinu Pescariu	7–6^{(7–2)}, 7–6^{(7–4)}

== ATP Challenger and ITF Futures finals ==
=== Singles: 4 (1–3) ===
Legend ATP Challenger (1–2) ITF Futures (0–1)	Finals by surface Hard (1–3) Clay (0–0) Grass (0–0) Carpet (0–0)

Result	W–L	Date	Tournament	Tier	Surface	Opponent	Score
Loss	0-1	May 1998	Jerusalem, Israel	Challenger	Hard	(South Africa) Neville Godwin	4–6, 6–7
Loss	0-2	Dec 1998	USA F11, Clearwater	Futures	Hard	(Portugal) João Cunha-Silva	1–6, 3–6
Win	1-2	Feb 1999	Amarillo, United States	Challenger	Hard	(United States) Brian Macphie	5–7, 6–4, 6–2
Loss	1-3	Nov 2001	Knoxville, United States	Challenger	Hard	(United States) James Blake	4–6, 4–6

=== Doubles: 20 (13–7) ===
Legend ATP Challenger (13–6) ITF Futures (0–1)	Finals by surface Hard (6–5) Clay (7–2) Grass (0–0) Carpet (0–0)

Result	W–L	Date	Tournament	Tier	Surface	Partner	Opponents	Score
Loss	0–1	Aug 1996	Belo Horizonte, Brazil	Challenger	Hard	(Mexico) Luis-Enrique Herrera	(Mexico) Leonardo Lavalle (Venezuela) Maurice Ruah	7–5, 4–6, 4–6
Win	1–1	Aug 1997	Belo Horizonte, Brazil	Challenger	Hard	(United States) Glenn Weiner	(Brazil) Nelson Aerts (Brazil) André Sá	1–6, 6–3, 6–4
Win	2–1	Apr 1998	Puerto Vallarta, Mexico	Challenger	Hard	(Mexico) Luis-Enrique Herrera	(Czech Republic) Ota Fukárek (France) Régis Lavergne	6–3, 6–4
Loss	2–2	Aug 1998	Bronx, United States	Challenger	Hard	(Czech Republic) Ota Fukárek	(United States) Jared Palmer (Japan) Takao Suzuki	1–6, 2–6
Win	3–2	Aug 1999	Lexington, United States	Challenger	Hard	(United States) Michael Sell	(United States) Scott Humphries (United States) Kevin Kim	7–6, 6–7, 6–4
Win	4–2	Sep 1999	Brașov, Romania	Challenger	Clay	(Romania) Andrei Pavel	(Romania) Gheorghe Cosac (Romania) Dinu-Mihai Pescariu	6–2, 6–2
Loss	4–3	Oct 2000	Tulsa, United States	Challenger	Hard	(United States) Glenn Weiner	(Mexico) Enrique Abaroa (United States) Michael Sell	7–5, 4–6, 2–6
Win	5–3	Jul 2001	Eisenach, Germany	Challenger	Clay	(Switzerland) Yves Allegro	(Germany) Tomas Behrend (Germany) Franz Stauder	7–6^{(10–8)}, 6–4
Loss	5–4	Dec 2001	Urbana, United States	Challenger	Hard	(South Africa) Paul Rosner	(United States) Mardy Fish (United States) Jeff Morrison	3–6, 7–5, 4–6
Win	6–4	Jan 2002	Waikoloa, United States	Challenger	Hard	(United States) Glenn Weiner	(United States) James Blake (United States) Justin Gimelstob	6–4, 4–6, 6–4
Win	7–4	Apr 2002	Napoli, Italy	Challenger	Clay	(Belarus) Vladimir Voltchkov	(Argentina) Leonardo Olguín (Argentina) Martín Vassallo Argüello	7–5, 7–6^{(7–5)}
Win	8–4	May 2002	Rome, Italy	Challenger	Clay	(Belarus) Vladimir Voltchkov	(Argentina) Sergio Roitman (Argentina) Andrés Schneiter	6–1, 6–2
Win	9–4	Nov 2002	Urbana, United States	Challenger	Hard	(United States) Glenn Weiner	(United States) Eric Taino (Netherlands) Martin Verkerk	6–3, 6–2
Loss	9–5	Aug 2003	Netherlands F4, Enschede	Futures	Clay	(Sweden) Robert Lindstedt	(Netherlands) Edwin Kempes (Netherlands) Paul Logtens	walkover
Loss	9–6	Jul 2004	Hilversum, Netherlands	Challenger	Clay	(Hungary) Attila Sávolt	(Netherlands) Fred Hemmes (Netherlands) Melle van Gemerden	6–7^{(3–7)}, 6–7^{(3–7)}
Win	10–6	Sep 2004	Freudenstadt, Germany	Challenger	Clay	(Germany) Alexander Waske	(Spain) Salvador Navarro-Gutierrez (Spain) Santiago Ventura	6–3, 6–7^{(5–7)}, 6–2
Win	11–6	Nov 2004	Homestead, United States	Challenger	Hard	(United States) Glenn Weiner	(United States) Huntley Montgomery (United States) Tripp Phillips	5–7, 7–5, 6–2
Loss	11–7	Nov 2004	Dnipropetrovsk, Ukraine	Challenger	Hard	(Romania) Andrei Pavel	(Slovakia) Karol Beck (Czech Republic) Jaroslav Levinský	7–6^{(7–4)}, 6–7^{(4–7)}, 6–7^{(2–7)}
Win	12–7	May 2005	Zagreb, Croatia	Challenger	Clay	(Belgium) Tom Vanhoudt	(Italy) Enzo Artoni (Argentina) Martín Vassallo Argüello	6–2, 4–6, 7—5
Win	13–7	Jul 2005	Biella, Italy	Challenger	Clay	(Belgium) Tom Vanhoudt	(Argentina) Carlos Berlocq (Brazil) Ricardo Mello	6–4, 4–6, 6—4

== Performance timelines ==
Key
W	F	SF	QF	#R	RR	Q#	DNQ	A	NH

(W) winner; (F) finalist; (SF) semifinalist; (QF) quarterfinalist; (#R) rounds 4, 3, 2, 1; (RR) round-robin stage; (Q#) qualification round; (DNQ) did not qualify; (A) absent; (NH) not held; (SR) strike rate (events won / competed); (W–L) win–loss record.

=== Singles ===
Tournament	1995	1996	1997	1998	1999	2000	2001	2002	2003	SR	W–L	Win %
Grand Slam tournaments
Australian Open	A	A	A	Q2	A	A	A	A	Q2	0 / 0	0–0	–
French Open	A	A	A	A	Q1	A	A	Q3	A	0 / 0	0–0	–
Wimbledon	Q1	A	Q2	Q2	Q3	A	A	Q1	A	0 / 0	0–0	–
US Open	Q1	Q1	Q1	Q2	Q2	A	Q2	Q1	A	0 / 0	0–0	–
Win–loss	0–0	0–0	0–0	0–0	0–0	0–0	0–0	0–0	0–0	0 / 0	0–0	–
ATP Tour Masters 1000
Indian Wells	Q2	A	A	A	A	A	A	A	A	0 / 0	0–0	–
Miami	Q2	A	A	A	A	A	A	A	A	0 / 0	0–0	–
Canada	A	A	A	A	A	A	Q1	A	A	0 / 0	0–0	–
Cincinnati	A	A	A	A	A	A	A	Q1	A	0 / 0	0–0	–
Stuttgart	A	A	A	A	A	A	Q2	A	A	0 / 0	0–0	–
Win–loss	0–0	0–0	0–0	0–0	0–0	0–0	0–0	0–0	0–0	0 / 0	0–0	–

=== Doubles ===
Tournament	1997	1998	1999	2000	2001	2002	2003	2004–2008	2009	2010	SR	W–L	Win %
Grand Slam tournaments
Australian Open	A	A	A	A	A	A	A	A	A	A	0 / 0	0–0	–
French Open	A	A	A	A	A	1R	A	A	A	1R	0 / 2	0–2	0%
Wimbledon	A	Q1	2R	A	A	2R	A	A	A	A	0 / 2	2–2	50%
US Open	Q2	A	Q1	A	A	A	A	A	1R	A	0 / 1	0–1	0%
Win–loss	0–0	0–0	1–1	0–0	0–0	1–2	0–0	0–0	0–1	0–1	0 / 5	2–5	29%
ATP Tour Masters 1000
Stuttgart	A	A	A	A	1R	A	A	A	A	A	0 / 1	0–1	0%
Win–loss	0–0	0–0	0–0	0–0	0–1	0–0	0–0	0–0	0–0	0–0	0 / 1	0–1	0%
