= George Cosac =

Romanian tennis player

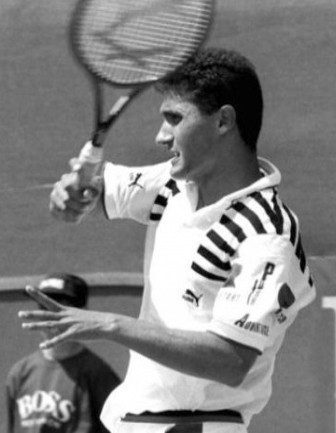
- Cosac in 1990
- Country (sports): Romania
- Born: 26 January 1968 (age 57); Constanța, Romania
- Height: 1.90 m (6 ft 3 in)
- Plays: Right-handed
- Prize money: US$ 86,518

Singles
- Career record: 1–7
- Career titles: 0
- Highest ranking: No. 265 (23 October 1995)

Doubles
- Career record: 18–22
- Career titles: 0
- Highest ranking: No. 170 (15 April 1991)

Team competitions
- Davis Cup: 9–14

George Cosac (born 26 January 1968) is a former tennis player from Romania. He competed in doubles at the 1992 Summer Olympics, together with Dinu Pescariu, but the pair was eliminated in the quarter-finals. Cosac reached his highest singles ATP-ranking on 23 October 1995, when he became the number 265 of the world.

On 22 February 2013, he was elected president of the Romanian Tennis Federation.

== Career finals ==
=== Doubles: 3 (3 losses) ===
Result	W/L	Date	Tournament	Surface	Partner	Opponents	Score
Loss	0–1	Aug 1990	Prague, Czechoslovakia	Clay	(Romania) Florin Segărceanu	(Czech Republic) Vojtěch Flégl (Czech Republic) Daniel Vacek	7–5, 4–6, 3–6
Loss	0–2	Sep 1993	Bucharest, Romania	Clay	(Romania) Ciprian Porumb	(Netherlands) Menno Oosting (Belgium) Libor Pimek	6–7, 6–7
Loss	0–3	Sep 1998	Bucharest, Romania	Clay	(Romania) Dinu Pescariu	(Romania) Andrei Pavel (Romania) Gabriel Trifu	6–7, 6–7
