= Andrei Pavel =

Romanian tennis player

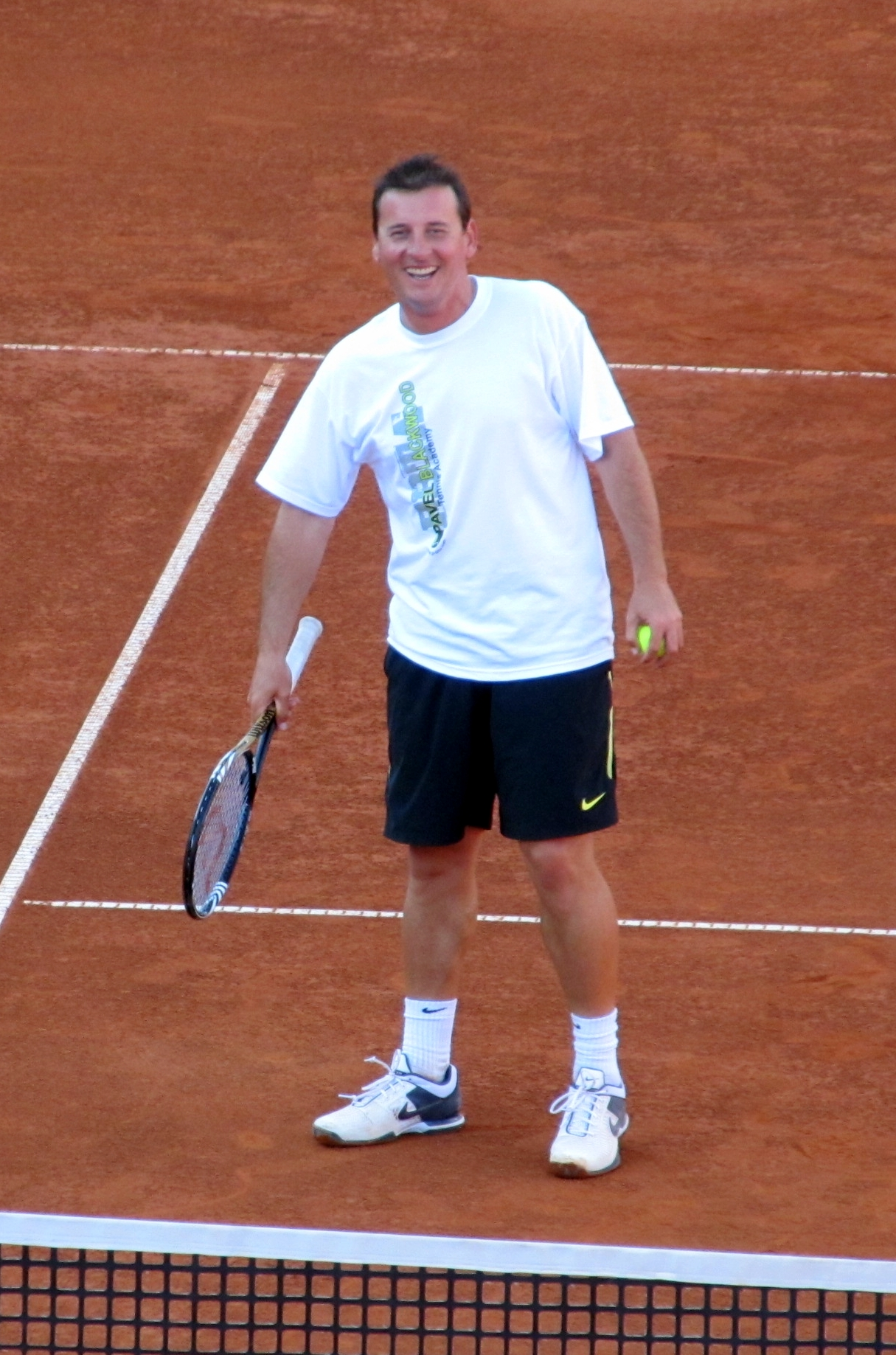
- Pavel at the 2012 BRD Năstase Țiriac Trophy
- Country (sports): Romania
- Born: 27 January 1974 (age 52) Constanța, SR Romania
- Height: 1.82 m (5 ft 11 1/2 in)
- Turned pro: 1995
- Retired: 23 September 2009
- Plays: Right-handed (one-handed backhand)
- Prize money: $5,225,028

Singles
- Career record: 277–266
- Career titles: 3
- Highest ranking: No. 13 (25 October 2004)

Grand Slam singles results
- Australian Open: 4R (1999, 2004)
- French Open: QF (2002)
- Wimbledon: 3R (2000, 2002)
- US Open: 4R (2000, 2004)

Other tournaments
- Olympic Games: 1R (1992, 1996, 2000, 2004)

Doubles
- Career record: 142–136
- Career titles: 6
- Highest ranking: No. 18 (30 April 2007)

Grand Slam doubles results
- Australian Open: QF (2005)
- French Open: SF (2006)
- Wimbledon: 3R (2004, 2007, 2009)
- US Open: 2R (2004, 2005, 2007, 2009)

Other doubles tournaments
- Olympic Games: 1R (1996, 2000, 2004)

Grand Slam mixed doubles results
- Wimbledon: 2R (2009)
- US Open: 1R (2009)
- Last updated on: 18 April 2025.

Andrei Pavel (born 27 January 1974) is a Romanian tennis coach and former professional tennis player. He achieved a career-high ATP singles ranking of world No. 13 and won three titles, including the 2001 Canada Masters. He also reached a career-high in doubles of No. 18 and won six doubles titles.

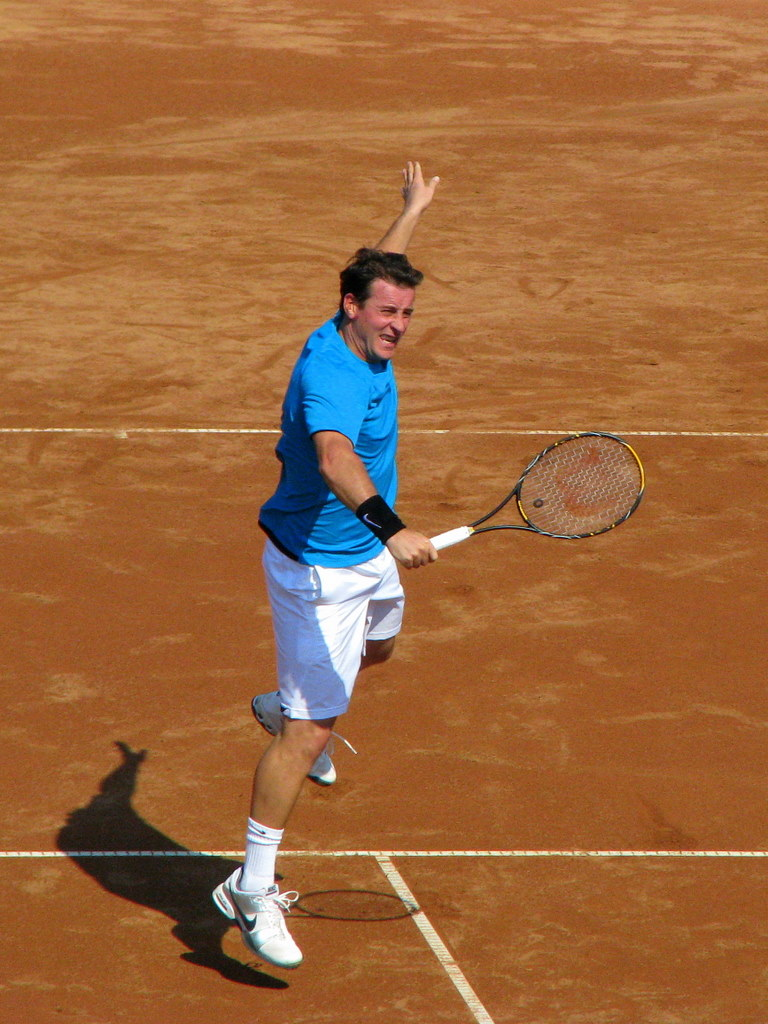
Pavel in 2009 during his last singles match

== Early life ==
Pavel began playing tennis at the age of eight and moved to Germany at sixteen in 1990.

== Career ==
In 2001, he won the biggest title of his career, the 2001 Canada Masters in Montreal, defeating Patrick Rafter in the final.

In 2002, while he was about to play a quarterfinal at Roland Garros, he jumped into a car and made an express round-trip to Germany to attend the birth of his son. It equalled to 1000 miles in 24 hоurs, in the pouring rain with... Àlex Corretja waiting for his return on the Central. "It's a bit odd that these two events overlapped, said the Romanian. But no matter the sporting challenge: I would not have missed the birth of Marius for the world. The whole story with the rain was a godsend for the press, but for me, it didn’t really made a difference: I would have gone no matter what."

In 2006, Pavel played what John McEnroe considers to be the best first round match at a Grand Slam he has ever seen at the US Open in August 2006, where he lost to Andre Agassi in four sets; 6–7^{(4)}, 7–6^{(8)}, 7–6^{(6)}, 6–2; taking three and half hours. Had Pavel won, it would have been Agassi's last match in a professional tournament.

In 2009, he played his last singles match in his homeland tournament in Bucharest against Pablo Cuevas of Uruguay. At the same tournament, he also played two more exhibition matches, one facing Goran Ivanišević, while in the other he paired up with Ilie Năstase against Mansour Bahrami and Yannick Noah.

He attended the Olympic Games five times, and played for 20 years on the Romania Davis Cup team. He became the captain of the team in 2009.

== After retirement ==
After retiring from professional tennis in 2009, Pavel moved into coaching and worked with several ATP and WTA players as well as Romanian prospects. Some notable players he has coached include Benjamin Becker, a former ATP Top 40 player; Marius Copil, whom he coached during part of Copil’s rise into the Top 100; and Horia Tecău, the Romanian doubles specialist and Grand Slam champion.

On the WTA Tour, Pavel worked with several prominent players, including former world No. 1 Simona Halep, joining her coaching team in 2017 alongside Darren Cahill. Earlier in his coaching career he also coached former world No. 1 Jelena Janković and collaborated with Tamira Paszek on the WTA Tour. In addition, he worked with Romanian WTA players such as Sorana Cîrstea and Monica Niculescu during parts of their careers.

He is currently coaching Nicholas David Ionel, Ștefan Paloși and Sebastian Gima.

== Personal life ==
Pavel was married to a German woman, Simone, from 1994 to 2014, and they have two children: a daughter, Caroline, and a son, Marius.

In 2010, after spending 20 years in Germany, he relocated to Arizona, United States, where he co-founded the Pavel Blackwood Tennis Academy. Since 2018, he has been in a relationship with Adriana Vărbanciu, and in April 2023, they welcomed their daughter, Andreea. He currently resides in Bucharest, Romania.

== Career finals ==
=== Singles (3 wins, 6 losses) ===
Legend (singles)
Grand Slam (0-0)
Tennis Masters Cup (0-0)
ATP Masters Series (1-1)
ATP International Series Gold (1-0)
ATP Tour (1-5)

Result	W–L	Date	Tournament	Surface	Opponent	Score
Win	1–0	Apr 1998	Tokyo, Japan	Hard	(Zimbabwe) Byron Black	6–3, 6–4
Loss	1–1	Apr 1999	Munich, Germany	Clay	(Argentina) Franco Squillari	4–6, 3–6
Loss	1–2	Jun 1999	s’Hertogenbosch, Netherlands	Grass	(Australia) Patrick Rafter	6–3, 6–7^{(7–9)}, 4–6
Win	2–2	May 2000	St. Pölten, Austria	Clay	(Australia) Andrew Ilie	7–5, 3–6, 6–2
Win	3–2	Jul 2001	Montreal, Canada	Hard	(Australia) Patrick Rafter	7–6^{(7–3)}, 2–6, 6–3
Loss	3–3	Oct 2003	Paris, France	Carpet	(United Kingdom) Tim Henman	2–6, 6–7^{(6–8)}, 6–7^{(2–7)}
Loss	3–4	Apr 2005	Munich, Germany	Clay	(Argentina) David Nalbandian	4–6, 1–6
Loss	3–5	May 2006	Pörtschach, Austria	Clay	(Russia) Nikolay Davydenko	0–6, 3–6
Loss	3–6	Jul 2007	Umag, Croatia	Clay	(Spain) Carlos Moyá	4–6, 2–6

=== Doubles (6 titles, 5 runners-up) ===
Result	W–L	Date	Tournament	Surface	Partner	Opponents	Score
Win	1–0	Sep 1998	Bucharest, Romania	Clay	(Romania) Gabriel Trifu	(Romania) George Cosac (Romania) Dinu Pescariu	7–6^{(7–2)}, 7–6^{(7–4)}
Loss	1–1	Feb 1999	Saint Petersburg, Russia	Carpet	(Netherlands) Menno Oosting	(United States) Jeff Tarango (Czech Republic) Daniel Vacek	6–3, 3–6, 5–7
Loss	1–2	Jan 2005	Doha, Qatar	Hard	(Russia) Mikhail Youzhny	(Spain) Albert Costa (Spain) Rafael Nadal	3–6, 6–4, 3–6
Win	2–2	Jul 2005	Kitzbühel, Austria	Clay	(Czech Republic) Leoš Friedl	(Belgium) Christophe Rochus (Belgium) Olivier Rochus	6–2, 6–7^{(5–7)}, 6–0
Loss	2–3	Sep 2005	Bucharest, Romania	Clay	(Romania) Victor Hănescu	(Argentina) José Acasuso (Argentina) Sebastián Prieto	3–6, 6–4, 3–6
Win	3–3	Jan 2006	Auckland, New Zealand	Hard	(Netherlands) Rogier Wassen	(Sweden) Simon Aspelin (Australia) Todd Perry	3–6, 7–5, [4–10]
Win	4–3	May 2006	Munich, Germany	Clay	(Germany) Alexander Waske	(Austria) Alexander Peya (Germany) Björn Phau	6–4, 6–2
Win	5–3	Jul 2006	Gstaad, Switzerland	Clay	(Czech Republic) Jiří Novák	(Switzerland) Marco Chiudinelli (Switzerland) Jean-Claude Scherrer	6–3, 6–1
Loss	5–4	Feb 2007	Rotterdam, Netherlands	Hard	(Germany) Alexander Waske	(Czech Republic) Martin Damm (India) Leander Paes	3–6, 7–6^{(7–5)}, [7–10]
Win	6–4	Apr 2007	Barcelona, Spain	Clay	(Germany) Alexander Waske	(Spain) Rafael Nadal (Spain) Bartolomé Salvá Vidal	6–3, 7–6^{(7–1)}
Loss	6–5	May 2009	Kitzbühel, Austria	Clay	(Romania) Horia Tecău	(Brazil) Marcelo Melo (Brazil) André Sá	7–6^{(11–9)}, 2–6, [7–10]

== ATP Challenger and ITF Futures finals ==
=== Singles: 8 (4–4) ===
Legend ATP Challenger (4–4) ITF Futures (0–0)	Finals by surface Hard (2–0) Clay (2–3) Grass (0–0) Carpet (0–1)

Result	W–L	Date	Tournament	Tier	Surface	Opponent	Score
Loss	0–1	Jul 1995	Scheveningen, Netherlands	Challenger	Clay	(Spain) Jordi Arrese	3–6, 7–6, 4–6
Win	1–1	Jul 1996	Montauban, France	Challenger	Clay	(France) Stephane Huet	6–4, 6–3
Loss	1–2	May 1997	Ljubljana, Slovenia	Challenger	Clay	(New Zealand) Brett Steven	6–7, 2–6
Loss	1–3	Mar 1998	Magdeburg, Germany	Challenger	Carpet	(Germany) Lars Burgsmuller	3–7, 4–6
Win	2–3	Jul 1999	Venice, Italy	Challenger	Clay	(Czech Republic) Slava Dosedel	6–2, 6–0
Win	3–3	Nov 2004	Dnepropetrovsk, Ukraine	Challenger	Hard	(Slovenia) Karol Kucera	walkover
Win	4–3	Dec 2004	Port Louis, Mauritius	Challenger	Hard	(South Korea) Lee Hyung-taik	6–3, 6–1
Loss	4–4	May 2007	Tunis, Tunisia	Challenger	Clay	(Italy) Simone Bolelli	6–4, 6–7^{(4–7)}, 2–6

=== Doubles: 9 (5–4) ===
Legend ATP Challenger (5–4) ITF Futures (0–0)	Finals by surface Hard (1–1) Clay (4–2) Grass (0–1) Carpet (0–0)

Result	W–L	Date	Tournament	Tier	Surface	Partner	Opponents	Score
Win	1–0	Jul 1994	Prague, Czech Republic	Challenger	Clay	(Germany) Alex Radulescu	(Israel) Eyal Ran (New Zealand) Glenn Wilson	6–4, 6–2
Win	2–0	Jul 1995	Scheveningen, Netherlands	Challenger	Clay	(Israel) Eyal Ran	(Spain) Emilio Benfele Álvarez (Spain) Pepe Imaz	6–4, 6–4
Win	3–0	Sep 1995	Prostejov, Czech Republic	Challenger	Clay	(New Zealand) Glenn Wilson	(United States) Jeff Belloli (United States) Jack Waite	7–5, 6–3
Loss	3–1	Jun 1996	Zagreb, Croatia	Challenger	Clay	(South Africa) Clinton Ferreira	(United States) Donald Johnson (United States) Jack Waite	6–3, 1–6, 0–6
Loss	3–2	Jul 1996	Montauban, France	Challenger	Clay	(South Africa) Clinton Ferreira	(France) Gilles Bastie (Ivory Coast) Claude N'Goran	4–6, 6–1, 6–7
Loss	3–3	Nov 1996	Port Louis, Mauritius	Challenger	Grass	(Netherlands) Sander Groen	(Germany) Patrick Baur (Netherlands) Joost Winnink	1–0 ret.
Win	4–3	Sep 1999	Brasov, Romania	Challenger	Clay	(Romania) Gabriel Trifu	(Romania) Gheorghe Cosac (Romania) Dinu-Mihai Pescariu	6–2, 6–2
Loss	4–4	Nov 2004	Dnepropetrovsk, Ukraine	Challenger	Hard	(Romania) Gabriel Trifu	(Slovakia) Karol Beck (Czech Republic) Jaroslav Levinsky	7–6^{(7–4)}, 6–7^{(4–7)}, 6–7^{(2–7)}
Win	5–4	Dec 2004	Port Louis, Mauritius	Challenger	Hard	(Romania) Gabriel Trifu	(South Africa) Jeff Coetzee (South Africa) Rik De Voest	6–3, 6–4

== Junior Grand Slam finals ==
=== Singles: 1 (1 title) ===
Result	Year	Tournament	Surface	Opponent	Score
Win	1992	French Open	Clay	(Italy) Mose Navarra	6–1, 3–6, 6–3

== Singles performance timeline ==
Key
W	F	SF	QF	#R	RR	Q#	DNQ	A	NH

(W) winner; (F) finalist; (SF) semifinalist; (QF) quarterfinalist; (#R) rounds 4, 3, 2, 1; (RR) round-robin stage; (Q#) qualification round; (DNQ) did not qualify; (A) absent; (NH) not held; (SR) strike rate (events won / competed); (W–L) win–loss record.

Tournament	1990	1991	1992	1993	1994	1995	1996	1997	1998	1999	2000	2001	2002	2003	2004	2005	2006	2007	2008	2009	W ‑ L	Win %
Grand Slam tournaments
Australian Open	A	A	A	A	A	A	LQ	1R	A	4R	A	2R	3R	1R	4R	2R	2R	LQ	1R	1R	11–10	52
French Open	A	A	A	A	A	A	A	2R	A	1R	1R	1R	QF	A	2R	1R	1R	LQ	A	1R	6–9	40
Wimbledon	A	A	A	A	LQ	A	LQ	2R	1R	1R	3R	1R	3R	A	2R	2R	2R	2R	A	1R	9–11	45
US Open	A	A	A	A	LQ	A	1R	1R	1R	1R	4R	2R	1R	A	4R^{[a]}	1R	1R	2R	A	1R	8–11	42
Win–loss	0–0	0–0	0–0	0–0	0–0	0–0	0–1	2–4	0–2	3–4	5–3	2–4	8–4	0–1	8–3	2–4	2–4	2–2	0–1	0–4	34–41	45
Olympic Games
Singles	NH		1R	Not held			1R	Not held			1R	Not held			1R	Not held			A	NH	N/A	
ATP Masters Series 1000
Indian Wells Masters	A	A	A	A	A	A	A	A	A	LQ	A	1R	2R	1R	2R	3R	1R	LQ	A	A		
Miami Masters	A	A	A	A	A	A	A	A	A	3R	3R	4R	QF	2R	QF	1R	1R	LQ	A	A		
Monte Carlo Masters	A	A	A	A	A	A	A	A	A	2R	LQ	2R	3R	A	3R	A	A	1R	A	A		
Rome Masters	A	A	A	A	A	A	A	A	A	A	3R	1R	2R	A	QF	1R	A	A	A	A		
Madrid Masters(Stuttgart)	A	A	A	A	A	LQ	LQ	LQ	2R	QF	QF	2R	1R	LQ	3R	1R	A	1R	A	A		
Canada Masters	A	A	A	A	A	A	A	A	A	A	2R	W	2R	A	1R	2R	A	A	A	A		
Cincinnati Masters	A	A	A	A	A	A	A	A	A	1R	1R	2R	1R	A	1R	1R	A	LQ	A	A		
Paris Masters	A	A	A	A	A	1R	A	A	LQ	A	1R	1R	1R	F	3R	1R	A	A	A			
Hamburg Masters	A	A	A	A	A	A	A	A	A	A	SF	1R	2R	A	3R	1R	A	LQ	A			
Year-end ranking	460	548	489	311	408	214	135	118	68	41	27	28	26	69	18	80	113	75	1142	600	NA	

^{a} 2004 US Open counts as 3 wins, 0 losses. Roger Federer walkover in round 4, after Pavel withdrew because of a back injury, does not count as a Pavel loss (nor a Federer win).
