= Dinu Pescariu =

Romanian tennis player (born 1974)

- Country (sports): Romania
- Residence: Bucharest, Romania
- Born: 12 April 1974 (age 52) Bucharest, Romania
- Height: 1.85 m (6 ft 1 in)
- Turned pro: 1991
- Retired: 2005
- Plays: Right-handed
- Prize money: US$ 676,539

Singles
- Career record: 28–63
- Career titles: 9 Challenger, 0 Futures
- Highest ranking: No. 75 (8 June 1998)

Grand Slam singles results
- Australian Open: 1R (1997, 1998, 1999)
- French Open: 2R (1991)
- Wimbledon: 2R (1998)
- US Open: 2R (1997)

Other tournaments
- Olympic Games: 1R (1996)

Doubles
- Career record: 22–29
- Career titles: 1; 4 Challenger, 1 Futures
- Highest ranking: No. 114 (13 October 1997)

Grand Slam doubles results
- Australian Open: 1R (1999)
- US Open: 2R (1997)

Other doubles tournaments
- Olympic Games: 1R (1996)

Team competitions
- Davis Cup: 10–11
- Last updated on: 25 October 2021.

Dinu Mihail Pescariu (born 12 April 1974) is a former tennis player from Romania. He reached his highest ATP singles ranking on 8 June 1998, when he became world No. 75. The right-hander represented his native country at two Summer Olympics: in Barcelona (1992) and in Atlanta (1996).

== ATP career finals ==
=== Doubles: 3 (1 title, 2 runners-up) ===
Legend Grand Slam tournaments (0–0) ATP World Tour Finals (0–0) ATP Masters Series (0–0) ATP Championship Series Gold (0–0) ATP World Series (1–2)	Finals by surface Hard (0–0) Clay (1–2) Grass (0–0) Carpet (0–0)	Finals by setting Outdoor (1–2) Indoor (0–0)

Result	W–L	Date	Tournament	Tier	Surface	Partner	Opponents	Score
Loss	0–1	Nov 1996	Santiago, Chile	World Series	Clay	(Spain) Álbert Portas	(Brazil) Gustavo Kuerten (Brazil) Fernando Meligeni	4–6, 2–6
Win	1–1	Jul 1997	Umag, Croatia	World Series	Clay	(Italy) Davide Sanguinetti	(Czech Republic) Dominik Hrbatý (Czech Republic) Karol Kučera	7–6, 6–4
Loss	1–2	Sep 1998	Bucharest, Romania	World Series	Clay	(Romania) George Cosac	(Romania) Andrei Pavel (Romania) Gabriel Trifu	6–7, 6–7

== Performance timeline ==
Key
W	F	SF	QF	#R	RR	Q#	DNQ	A	NH

(W) winner; (F) finalist; (SF) semifinalist; (QF) quarterfinalist; (#R) rounds 4, 3, 2, 1; (RR) round-robin stage; (Q#) qualification round; (DNQ) did not qualify; (A) absent; (NH) not held; (SR) strike rate (events won / competed); (W–L) win–loss record.

=== Singles ===
Tournament	1991	1992	1993	1994	1995	1996	1997	1998	1999	2000	SR	W–L	Win %
Grand Slam tournaments
Australian Open	A	A	A	A	A	A	1R	1R	1R	Q1	0 / 3	0–3	0%
French Open	2R	A	A	A	A	Q3	Q1	1R	1R	A	0 / 3	1–3	25%
Wimbledon	A	A	A	A	A	A	1R	2R	1R	A	0 / 3	1–3	25%
US Open	A	A	Q2	A	A	A	2R	1R	A	A	0 / 2	1–2	33%
Win–loss	1–1	0–0	0–0	0–0	0–0	0–0	1–3	1–4	0–3	0–0	0 / 11	3–11	21%
ATP Masters Series
Indian Wells	A	A	A	Q1	A	Q1	A	Q1	A	A	0 / 0	0–0	–
Monte Carlo	2R	A	A	Q2	A	A	A	Q1	2R	A	0 / 2	2–2	50%
Hamburg	A	A	A	A	A	A	Q2	A	A	A	0 / 0	0–0	–
Rome	A	A	Q2	A	Q3	A	A	A	A	A	0 / 0	0–0	–
Paris	A	A	Q1	A	A	A	A	A	A	A	0 / 0	0–0	–
Win–loss	1–1	0–0	0–0	0–0	0–0	0–0	0–0	0–0	1–1	0–0	0 / 2	2–2	50%

== ATP Challenger and ITF Futures finals ==
=== Singles: 14 (9–5) ===
Legend ATP Challenger (9–5) ITF Futures (0–0)	Finals by surface Hard (1–0) Clay (8–5)

Result	W–L	Date	Tournament	Tier	Surface	Opponent	Score
Loss	0–1	Aug 1991	Geneva, Switzerland	Challenger	Clay	(Spain) Marcos Górriz	3–6, 2–6
Loss	0–2	Jun 1993	Košice, Slovakia	Challenger	Clay	(Czech Republic) David Rikl	6–7, 7–5, 3–6
Win	1–2	Jun 1995	Weiden, Germany	Challenger	Clay	(Germany) Lars Burgsmüller	6–4, 6–2
Win	2–2	Nov 1995	Beijing, China	Challenger	Hard	(Portugal) João Cunha-Silva	3–6, 6–2, 6–3
Win	3–2	Sep 1996	Brașov, Romania	Challenger	Clay	(Romania) Răzvan Sabău	4–6, 6–2, 6–3
Win	4–2	Apr 1997	Napoli, Italy	Challenger	Clay	(Germany) Oliver Gross	6–4, 6–2
Win	5–2	Apr 1997	Split, Croatia	Challenger	Clay	(Costa Rica) Juan Antonio Marín	3–6, 6–2, 6–1
Win	6–2	Jul 1997	Ulm, Germany	Challenger	Clay	(Austria) Stefan Koubek	7–5, 6–1
Loss	6–3	Jul 1997	Brașov, Romania	Challenger	Clay	(Romania) Ionuț Moldovan	2–6, 4–6
Win	7–3	Sep 1997	Edinburgh, United Kingdom	Challenger	Clay	(Italy) Andrea Gaudenzi	4–6, 7–5, 6–1
Win	8–3	May 1998	Ljubljana, Slovenia	Challenger	Clay	(Romania) Adrian Voinea	7–6, 2–6, 6–3
Loss	8–4	Jul 1998	Ulm, Germany	Challenger	Clay	(Morocco) Younes El Aynaoui	4–6, 3–6
Win	9–4	Sep 1998	Brașov, Romania	Challenger	Clay	(Denmark) Thomas Larsen	6–3, 3–6, 6–2
Loss	9–5	May 1999	Ljubljana, Slovenia	Challenger	Clay	(Belarus) Vladimir Voltchkov	5–7, 7–6, 4–6

=== Doubles: 11 (5–6) ===
Legend ATP Challenger (4–6) ITF Futures (1–0)	Finals by surface Hard (0–1) Clay (5–5)

Result	W–L	Date	Tournament	Tier	Surface	Partner	Opponents	Score
Loss	0–1	Aug 1993	Istanbul, Turkey	Challenger	Hard	(United Kingdom) Miles Maclagan	(France) Jean-Philippe Fleurian (The Bahamas) Roger Smith	6–7, 3–6
Win	1–1	Sep 1996	Brașov, Romania	Challenger	Clay	(Romania) Gheorghe Cosac	(Argentina) Mariano Hood (Argentina) Martín Rodríguez	7–6, 6–1
Win	2–1	Apr 1997	Split, Croatia	Challenger	Clay	(United States) Devin Bowen	(United States) Trey Phillips (Mexico) David Roditi	7–6, 6–3
Loss	2–2	Jul 1997	Brașov, Romania	Challenger	Clay	(Romania) Ionuț Moldovan	(Romania) Gheorghe Cosac (United Kingdom) Miles Maclagan	4–6, 6–7
Loss	2–3	Oct 1997	Barcelona, Spain	Challenger	Clay	(Italy) Davide Sanguinetti	(Egypt) Tamer El Sawy (Portugal) Nuno Marques	1–6, 2–6
Win	3–3	Aug 1998	Graz, Austria	Challenger	Clay	(Spain) Albert Portas	(Socialist Federal Republic of Yugoslavia) Nebojsa Djordjevic (South Africa) Lan Bale	6–3, 6–4
Win	4–3	Jun 1999	Prostějov, Czech Republic	Challenger	Clay	(United States) Eric Taino	(United States) Devin Bowen (Israel) Eyal Ran	6–3, 6–3
Loss	4–4	Sep 1999	Brașov, Romania	Challenger	Clay	(Romania) Gheorghe Cosac	(Romania) Andrei Pavel (Romania) Gabriel Trifu	2–6, 2–6
Loss	4–5	Apr 2000	Barletta, Italy	Challenger	Clay	(Italy) Vincenzo Santopadre	(Czech Republic) Petr Kovačka (Czech Republic) Pavel Kudrnáč	7–6^{(7–4)}, 2–6, 0–6
Loss	4–6	May 2000	Budapest, Hungary	Challenger	Clay	(Georgia (country)) Irakli Labadze	(Japan) Thomas Shimada (South Africa) Myles Wakefield	2–6, 6–3, 3–6
Win	5–6	Jun 2003	Romania F1A, Bucharest	Futures	Clay	(Romania) Ionuț Moldovan	(Romania) Gabriel Moraru (Romania) Andrei Mlendea	2–6, 6–4, 6–1

== Controversy ==
On 10 October 2017, the Romanian National Anticorruption Directorate announced that Dinu Pescariu will be prosecuted in the file of taking over ‘Cutezatorii’ sports base in Bucharest. He is being investigated, under judicial control, for taking over the sports base illegally and reportedly paying a much smaller rental fee for it than the market rate.
