= 2000 Generali Open – Doubles =

Doubles
- 2000 Generali Open

Final
- Champions: (Argentina) Pablo Albano (Czech Republic) Cyril Suk
- Runners-up: (Australia) Joshua Eagle (Australia) Andrew Florent
- Score: 6–3, 3–6, 6–3

Details
- Draw: 24 (3WC/1Q/1LL)
- Seeds: 8

Events
Singles	Doubles
← 1999 ·	Austrian Open Kitzbühel	· 2001 →

Chris Haggard and Peter Nyborg were the defending champions, but competed this year with different partners. Haggard teamed up with Tom Vanhoudt and lost in the semifinals to Pablo Albano and Cyril Suk, while Nyborg teamed up with Aleksandar Kitinov and also lost in the semifinals to Joshua Eagle and Andrew Florent.

Albano and Suk won the title by defeating Eagle and Florent 6–3, 3–6, 6–3 in the final.

== Seeds ==
All seeds received a bye to the second round.

1. (Brazil) Jaime Oncins / (Argentina) Daniel Orsanic (second round)
2. (Australia) Joshua Eagle / (Australia) Andrew Florent (final)
3. (South Africa) David Adams / (United States) Jeff Tarango (second round)
4. (Argentina) Lucas Arnold Ker / (Spain) Tomás Carbonell (quarterfinals)
5. (South Africa) Chris Haggard / (Belgium) Tom Vanhoudt (semifinals)
6. (North Macedonia) Aleksandar Kitinov / (Sweden) Peter Nyborg (semifinals)
7. (Australia) Wayne Arthurs / (Federal Republic of Yugoslavia) Nenad Zimonjić (quarterfinals)
8. (Argentina) Pablo Albano / (Czech Republic) Cyril Suk (champions)

== Draw ==
Key

- Q = Qualifier
- WC = Wild card
- LL = Lucky loser
- Alt = Alternate
- ITF = ITF entry
- PR = Protected ranking
- SR = Special ranking
- SE = Special exempt
- JE = Junior exempt
- JR = Junior Accelerator Programme entrant
- CO = College Accelerator Programme entrant
- NG = Next Gen Accelerator Program entrant
- w/o = Walkover
- r = Retired
- d = Defaulted

=== Finals ===
Semifinals
8	(Argentina) Pablo Albano (Czech Republic) Cyril Suk	6	7^{7}
5	(South Africa) Chris Haggard (Belgium) Tom Vanhoudt	4	6^{2}
6	(North Macedonia) Aleksandar Kitinov (Sweden) Peter Nyborg	4	7	5
2	(Australia) Joshua Eagle (Australia) Andrew Florent	6	5	7

Final
8	(Argentina) Pablo Albano (Czech Republic) Cyril Suk	6	3	6
2	(Australia) Joshua Eagle (Australia) Andrew Florent	3	6	3

=== Top half ===
First round
(Spain) Á López Morón (Spain) A Portas	3	1
(Brazil) A Prieto (Spain) J Velasco Jr.	6	0^{r}
(South Africa) P Rosner (South Africa) J Weir-Smith	6	6
(Australia) T Crichton (Australia) A Fisher	2	4
(Spain) A Martín (Israel) E Ran	4	4
WC	(Chile) F González (Chile) N Massú	6	6
WC	(New Zealand) J Greenhalgh (Germany) R Schüttler	6	1	3
(Czech Republic) P Pála (Czech Republic) P Vízner	3	6	6

Second round
1	(Brazil) J Oncins (Argentina) D Orsanic	3	2
(Spain) Á López Morón (Spain) A Portas	6	6
(South Africa) P Rosner (South Africa) J Weir-Smith	6	6^{2}	2
8	(Argentina) P Albano (Czech Republic) C Suk	2	7^{7}	6
4	(Argentina) L Arnold Ker (Spain) T Carbonell	6	6
WC	(Chile) F González (Chile) N Massú	2	3
(Czech Republic) P Pála (Czech Republic) P Vízner	6	1	4
5	(South Africa) C Haggard (Belgium) T Vanhoudt	3	6	6

Quarterfinals
(Spain) Á López Morón (Spain) A Portas	4	4
8	(Argentina) P Albano (Czech Republic) C Suk	6	6
4	(Argentina) L Arnold Ker (Spain) T Carbonell	3	1
5	(South Africa) C Haggard (Belgium) T Vanhoudt	6	6

Semifinals
8	(Argentina) P Albano (Czech Republic) C Suk	6	7^{7}
5	(South Africa) C Haggard (Belgium) T Vanhoudt	4	6^{2}

=== Bottom half ===
First round
Q	(Puerto Rico) J Frontera (Argentina) H Moretti	0	6	4
LL	(Chile) A García (Italy) F Maggi	6	3	6
(Spain) E Benfele Álvarez (Australia) G Silcock	6	1	4
(United States) D Bowen (United States) J Thomas	4	6	6
(Argentina) F Cabello (Brazil) F Costa	6	3	4
WC	(Austria) O Marach (Austria) G Schaller	3	6	6
(Germany) MK Goellner (Russia) A Olhovskiy	7^{9}	7
(Austria) A Peya (Austria) T Strengberger	6^{7}	5

Second round
6	(North Macedonia) A Kitinov (Sweden) P Nyborg	4	7^{7}	6
LL	(Chile) A García (Italy) F Maggi	6	6^{5}	2
(United States) D Bowen (United States) J Thomas	7^{7}	6
3	(South Africa) D Adams (United States) J Tarango	6^{5}	4
7	(Australia) W Arthurs (Federal Republic of Yugoslavia) N Zimonjić	6	7
WC	(Austria) O Marach (Austria) G Schaller	1	5
(Germany) MK Goellner (Russia) A Olhovskiy	6	2	6^{8}
2	(Australia) J Eagle (Australia) A Florent	4	6	7^{10}

Quarterfinals
6	(North Macedonia) A Kitinov (Sweden) P Nyborg	6	6
(United States) D Bowen (United States) J Thomas	4	4
7	(Australia) W Arthurs (Federal Republic of Yugoslavia) N Zimonjić	4	6^{3}
2	(Australia) J Eagle (Australia) A Florent	6	7^{7}

Semifinals
6	(North Macedonia) A Kitinov (Sweden) P Nyborg	4	7	5
2	(Australia) J Eagle (Australia) A Florent	6	5	7
