= 1996 Oporto Open – Doubles =

Doubles
- 1996 Oporto Open
- 1995 Champions: (Spain) Tomás Carbonell (Spain) Francisco Roig

Final
- Champions: (Portugal) Emanuel Couto (Portugal) Bernardo Mota
- Runners-up: (Australia) Joshua Eagle (Australia) Andrew Florent
- Score: 4–6, 6–4, 6–4

Details
- Draw: 16
- Seeds: 4

Events
Singles	Doubles
← 1995 ·	Oporto Open

Tomás Carbonell and Francisco Roig were the defending champions but lost in the semifinals to Joshua Eagle and Andrew Florent.

Emanuel Couto and Bernardo Mota won in the final 4–6, 6–4, 6–4 against Eagle and Florent.

== Seeds ==
Champion seeds are indicated in bold text while text in italics indicates the round in which those seeds were eliminated.

1. (Belgium) Libor Pimek / (South Africa) Byron Talbot (semifinals)
2. (Spain) Tomás Carbonell / (Spain) Francisco Roig (semifinals)
3. (South Africa) David Adams / (Netherlands) Menno Oosting (first round)
4. (Australia) Joshua Eagle / (Australia) Andrew Florent (final)

== Draw ==
=== Key ===
- Q = Qualifier
- WC = Wild card
- LL = Lucky loser
- Alt = Alternate
- ITF = ITF entry
- PR = Protected ranking
- SR = Special ranking
- SE = Special exempt
- JE = Junior exempt
- JR = Junior Accelerator Programme entrant
- CO = College Accelerator Programme entrant
- NG = Next Gen Accelerator Program entrant
- w/o = Walkover
- r = Retired
- d = Defaulted

First round
1	(Belgium) **L Pimek** (South Africa) **B Talbot**	**6**	**6**
WC	(Belgium) F Dewulf (Morocco) Y El Aynaoui	2	2
(Germany) **M Huning** (Australia) **J Ireland**	**6**	6	**6**
Q	(Australia) R Fromberg (Argentina) H Gumy	1	**7**	4
3	(South Africa) D Adams (Netherlands) M Oosting	4	4
(Portugal) **E Couto** (Portugal) **B Mota**	**6**	**6**
(Morocco) K Alami (Hungary) G Köves	6	0
(Spain) **C Costa** (Spain) **E Sánchez**	**7**	**6**
WC	(Spain) **F Clavet** (Spain) **C Moyá**	**6**	**6**
(Spain) J Arrese (Italy) S Pescosolido	4	3
WC	(Spain) J Alonso (Portugal) V Gonçalves	2	1
4	(Australia) **J Eagle** (Australia) **A Florent**	**6**	**6**
(Portugal) J Cunha e Silva (Portugal) N Marques	1^{r}
(Italy) **O Camporese** (Ecuador) **N Lapentti**	4
(South Africa) B Haygarth (South Africa) C van Rensburg	4	0
2	(Spain) **T Carbonell** (Spain) **F Roig**	**6**	**6**

Quarterfinals
1	(Belgium) **L Pimek** (South Africa) **B Talbot**	3	**7**	**6**
(Germany) M Huning (Australia) J Ireland	**6**	6	2
(Portugal) **E Couto** (Portugal) **B Mota**	**6**	**6**
(Spain) C Costa (Spain) E Sánchez	2	4
WC	(Spain) F Clavet (Spain) C Moyá	3	**7**	4
4	(Australia) **J Eagle** (Australia) **A Florent**	**6**	6	**6**
(Italy) O Camporese (Ecuador) N Lapentti	**6**	3	3
2	(Spain) **T Carbonell** (Spain) **F Roig**	3	**6**	**6**

Semifinals
1	(Belgium) L Pimek (South Africa) B Talbot	**6**	2	2
(Portugal) **E Couto** (Portugal) **B Mota**	4	**6**	**6**
4	(Australia) **J Eagle** (Australia) **A Florent**	**7**	4	**6**
2	(Spain) T Carbonell (Spain) F Roig	6	**6**	4

Final
(Portugal) **Emanuel Couto** (Portugal) **Bernardo Mota**	4	**6**	**6**
4	(Australia) Joshua Eagle (Australia) Andrew Florent	**6**	4	4
