= 1995 Oporto Cup – Doubles =

Doubles
- 1995 Oporto Cup

Final
- Champions: (Spain) Tomás Carbonell (Spain) Francisco Roig
- Runners-up: (Spain) Jordi Arrese (Spain) Àlex Corretja
- Score: 6–3, 7–6

Details
- Draw: 16
- Seeds: 4

Events
Singles	Doubles
Oporto Cup	· 1996 →

The 1995 Oporto Cup doubles event was a competition of the 1995 Oporto Cup men's tennis tournament which was part of World Series of the 1995 ATP Tour and held from 12 June until 18 June 1995 in Porto, Portugal. The draw consisted of 16 teams of which four were seeded. The third-seeded team of Tomás Carbonell and Francisco Roig won the doubles title by defeating the unseeded team of Jordi Arrese and Àlex Corretja 6–3, 7–6 in the final.

== Seeds ==
1. (Spain) Sergio Casal / (Spain) Emilio Sánchez (semifinals)
2. (South Africa) Piet Norval / (Netherlands) Menno Oosting (first round)
3. (Spain) Tomás Carbonell / (Spain) Francisco Roig (champions)
4. (United States) Donald Johnson / (United States) Kenny Thorne (first round)

== Draw ==
=== Key ===
- Q = Qualifier
- WC = Wild card
- LL = Lucky loser
- Alt = Alternate
- ITF = ITF entry
- PR = Protected ranking
- SR = Special ranking
- SE = Special exempt
- JE = Junior exempt
- JR = Junior Accelerator Programme entrant
- CO = College Accelerator Programme entrant
- NG = Next Gen Accelerator Program entrant
- w/o = Walkover
- r = Retired
- d = Defaulted

First Round
1	(Spain) Sergio Casal (Spain) Emilio Sánchez	6	6
(Portugal) Riva Da Silva (Portugal) Vasco Goncalves	1	3
(Sweden) Rikard Bergh (United States) Jack Waite	6	0	3
(Portugal) Emanuel Couto (Portugal) Nuno Marques	4	6	6
4	(United States) Donald Johnson (United States) Kenny Thorne	6	7	4
(Spain) Jordi Arrese (Spain) Àlex Corretja	7	5	6
(United States) Mike Bauer (Australia) Jon Ireland	7	6
(Hungary) Sandor Noszaly (Italy) Stefano Pescosolido	6	4
(Belgium) Filip Dewulf (Argentina) Hernán Gumy	2	7	6
(Spain) Alberto Berasategui (Spain) Carlos Costa	6	6	7
(United States) Matt Lucena (United States) Jeff Tarango	4	4
3	(Spain) Tomás Carbonell (Spain) Francisco Roig	6	6
(Portugal) João Cunha e Silva (South Africa) Christo van Rensburg	7	3	6
(Spain) José Antonio Conde (Uruguay) Diego Pérez	6	6	3
(United States) Shelby Cannon (South Africa) Stefan Kruger	6	6
2	(South Africa) Piet Norval (Netherlands) Menno Oosting	2	0

Quarterfinals
1	(Spain) Sergio Casal (Spain) Emilio Sánchez	7	3	7
(Portugal) Emanuel Couto (Portugal) Nuno Marques	6	6	6
(Spain) Jordi Arrese (Spain) Àlex Corretja	7	6
(United States) Mike Bauer (Australia) Jon Ireland	5	2
(Spain) Alberto Berasategui (Spain) Carlos Costa	2	0
3	(Spain) Tomás Carbonell (Spain) Francisco Roig	6	6
(Portugal) João Cunha e Silva (South Africa) Christo van Rensburg	6	6
(United States) Shelby Cannon (South Africa) Stefan Kruger	3	4

Semifinals
1	(Spain) Sergio Casal (Spain) Emilio Sánchez	3	6	4
(Spain) Jordi Arrese (Spain) Àlex Corretja	6	4	6
3	(Spain) Tomás Carbonell (Spain) Francisco Roig	7	6	6
(Portugal) João Cunha e Silva (South Africa) Christo van Rensburg	5	7	4

Final
(Spain) Jordi Arrese (Spain) Àlex Corretja	3	6
3	(Spain) Tomás Carbonell (Spain) Francisco Roig	6	7
