= 1995 Oporto Cup =

- Date: 12–18 June
- Edition: 1st
- Category: World Series
- Draw: 32S / 16D
- Prize money: $303,000
- Surface: Clay / outdoor
- Location: Porto, Portugal

Champions

Singles
- (Spain) Alberto Berasategui

Doubles
- (Spain) Tomás Carbonell / (Spain) Francisco Roig
Oporto Cup	· 1996 →

The 1995 Oporto Open was a men's tennis tournament played on outdoor clay courts in Porto in Portugal that was part of the World Series of the 1995 ATP Tour. It was the inaugural edition of the tournament and was held from 12 June until 18 June 1995. First-seeded Alberto Berasategui won the singles title.

== Finals ==
=== Singles ===
(Spain) Alberto Berasategui defeated (Spain) Carlos Costa 3–6, 6–3, 6–4

- It was Berasategui's only singles title of the year and the 9th of his career.

=== Doubles ===
(Spain) Tomás Carbonell / (Spain) Francisco Roig defeated (Spain) Jordi Arrese / (Spain) Àlex Corretja 6–3, 7–6

- It was Carbonell's 2nd doubles title of the year and the 13th of his career. It was Roig's 2nd doubles title of the year and the 6th of his career.
