= 1996 Oporto Open =

- Date: 10–16 June
- Edition: 2nd
- Category: World Series
- Draw: 32S / 16D
- Prize money: $400,000
- Surface: Clay / outdoor
- Location: Porto, Portugal

Champions

Singles
- (Spain) Félix Mantilla

Doubles
- (Portugal) Emanuel Couto / (Portugal) Bernardo Mota
- Oporto Open

The 1996 Oporto Open was a men's tennis tournament played on outdoor clay courts in Porto in Portugal and was part of the World Series of the 1996 ATP Tour. It was the second and final edition of the tournament and ran from 10 June through 16 June 1996. Félix Mantilla won the singles title.

== Finals ==
=== Singles ===
(Spain) Félix Mantilla defeated (Argentina) Hernán Gumy 6–7^{(7–5)}, 6–4, 6–3

- It was Mantilla's only title of the year and the 1st of his career.

=== Doubles ===
(Portugal) Emanuel Couto / (Portugal) Bernardo Mota defeated (Australia) Joshua Eagle / (Australia) Andrew Florent 4–6, 6–4, 6–4

- It was Couto's only title of the year and the 1st of his career. It was Mota's only title of the year and the 1st of his career.
