= 1995 Oporto Cup – Singles =

Singles
- 1995 Oporto Cup

Final
- Champion: (Spain) Alberto Berasategui
- Runner-up: (Spain) Carlos Costa
- Score: 3–6, 6–3, 6–4

Details
- Draw: 32
- Seeds: 8

Events
Singles	Doubles
Oporto Cup	· 1996 →

The 1995 Oporto Cup – Singles was an event of the 1995 Oporto Cup men's tennis tournament which was part of World Series of the 1995 ATP Tour and held from 12 June until 18 June 1995 in Porto, Portugal. The draw consisted of 32 players and eight of them were seeded.

First-seeded Alberto Berasategui won in the final 3–6, 6–3, 6–4 against eighth-seeded Carlos Costa.

== Seeds ==
1. (Spain) Alberto Berasategui (champion)
2. (Germany) Bernd Karbacher (second round)
3. (Spain) Àlex Corretja (first round)
4. (Australia) Richard Fromberg (quarterfinals, withdrew)
5. (Spain) Francisco Clavet (semifinals)
6. (Spain) Albert Costa (first round)
7. (Norway) Christian Ruud (first round)
8. (Spain) Carlos Costa (final)

== Draw ==
=== Key ===
- Q = Qualifier
- WC = Wild card
- LL = Lucky loser
- Alt = Alternate
- ITF = ITF entry
- PR = Protected ranking
- SR = Special ranking
- SE = Special exempt
- JE = Junior exempt
- JR = Junior Accelerator Programme entrant
- CO = College Accelerator Programme entrant
- NG = Next Gen Accelerator Program entrant
- w/o = Walkover
- r = Retired
- d = Defaulted

=== Finals ===
Semifinals
1	(Spain) Alberto Berasategui	6	6
5	(Spain) Francisco Clavet	4	4
(Argentina) Hernán Gumy	6^{0}	6	4
8	(Spain) Carlos Costa	7^{7}	3	6

Final
1	(Spain) Alberto Berasategui	3	6	6
8	(Spain) Carlos Costa	6	3	4

=== Top half ===
First Round
1	(Spain) Alberto Berasategui	7	4	6
(Italy) Stefano Pescosolido	5	6	3
Q	(France) Frédéric Fontang	4	4
(Spain) Emilio Sánchez	6	6
(United States) Jeff Tarango	4	4
WC	(Portugal) Emanuel Couto	6	6
(Belgium) Filip Dewulf	7^{7}	7
7	(Norway) Christian Ruud	6^{4}	5
4	(Australia) Richard Fromberg	1	6	7
(Spain) Tomás Carbonell	6	4	5
(Spain) Oscar Martinez	6	2	3
(Portugal) Nuno Marques	2	6	6
Q	(United States) Donald Johnson	6	6^{5}	6
WC	(Portugal) João Cunha e Silva	3	7^{7}	4
WC	(Sweden) Magnus Gustafsson	6	5	3
5	(Spain) Francisco Clavet	3	7	6

Second Round
1	(Spain) Alberto Berasategui	7	7^{14}
(Spain) Emilio Sánchez	5	6^{12}
WC	(Portugal) Emanuel Couto	3	6	6^{5}
(Belgium) Filip Dewulf	6	2	7^{7}
4	(Australia) Richard Fromberg	6	3	7^{7}
(Portugal) Nuno Marques	4	6	6^{4}
Q	(United States) Donald Johnson	6	6^{5}	3
5	(Spain) Francisco Clavet	3	7^{7}	6

Quarterfinals
1	(Spain) Alberto Berasategui	6	6
(Belgium) Filip Dewulf	2	1
4	(Australia) Richard Fromberg
5	(Spain) Francisco Clavet	w/o

Semifinals
1	(Spain) Alberto Berasategui	6	6
5	(Spain) Francisco Clavet	4	4

=== Bottom half ===
First Round
6	(Spain) Albert Costa	6	3	2
(Germany) Carsten Arriens	3	6	6
(Belgium) Kris Goossens	6	6
(Spain) Alejo Mancisidor	4	3
(Haiti) Ronald Agénor	6^{2}	3
(Spain) Álex López Morón	7^{7}	6
(Argentina) Hernán Gumy	6	6
3	(Spain) Àlex Corretja	2	4
8	(Spain) Carlos Costa	6	6
(Germany) Carl-Uwe Steeb	1	4
Q	(Spain) Carlos Moyá	6	3	6
(Hungary) Sandor Noszaly	3	6	4
Q	(Russia) Andrei Cherkasov	7	1	1
(Spain) Jordi Arrese	5	6	6
(Spain) Juan Albert Viloca	5	0^{r}
2	(Germany) Bernd Karbacher	7	0

Second Round
(Germany) Carsten Arriens	3	7	6
(Belgium) Kris Goossens	6	5	1
(Spain) Álex López Morón	2	6	3
(Argentina) Hernán Gumy	6	3	6
8	(Spain) Carlos Costa	7^{7}	6
Q	(Spain) Carlos Moyá	6^{2}	2
(Spain) Jordi Arrese	6	6
2	(Germany) Bernd Karbacher	1	3

Quarterfinals
(Germany) Carsten Arriens	1	2
(Argentina) Hernán Gumy	6	6
8	(Spain) Carlos Costa	4	6	7^{7}
(Spain) Jordi Arrese	6	4	6^{5}

Semifinals
(Argentina) Hernán Gumy	6^{0}	6	4
8	(Spain) Carlos Costa	7^{7}	3	6
