= 2000 Generali Open =

- Date: 24–30 July
- Edition: 45th
- Category: International Series Gold
- Draw: 48S / 24D
- Prize money: $700,000
- Surface: Clay / outdoor
- Location: Kitzbühel, Austria
- Venue: Tennis Stadium Kitzbühel

Champions

Singles
- (Spain) Àlex Corretja

Doubles
- (Argentina) Pablo Albano / (Czech Republic) Cyril Suk
- Generali Open

The 2000 Generali Open was a men's tennis tournament played on outdoor clay courts at the Tennis Stadium Kitzbühel in Kitzbühel, Austria that was part of the International Series Gold of the 2000 ATP Tour. It was the 45th edition of the tournament and was held from 24 July until 30 July 2000. Second-seeded Àlex Corretja won the singles title.

== Finals ==
=== Singles ===
(Spain) Àlex Corretja defeated (Spain) Emilio Benfele Álvarez 6–3, 6–1, 3–0 ret.

- It was Corretja's 3rd singles title of the year and the 12th of his career.

=== Doubles ===
(Argentina) Pablo Albano / (Czech Republic) Cyril Suk defeated (Australia) Joshua Eagle / (Australia) Andrew Florent 6–3, 3–6, 6–3
