= 1999 International Raiffeisen Grand Prix =

- Date: 17–23 May
- Edition: 19th
- Category: International Series
- Surface: Clay / outdoor
- Location: St. Pölten, Austria

Champions

Singles
- (Chile) Marcelo Ríos

Doubles
- (Australia) Andrew Florent / (Russia) Andrei Olhovskiy
← 1998 ·	International Raiffeisen Grand Prix	· 2000 →

The 1999 International Raiffeisen Grand Prix was a men's tennis tournament played on Clay in St. Pölten, Austria that was part of the World Series of the 1999 ATP Tour. It was the nineteenth edition of the tournament and was held from 17 May until 23 May 1999. Second-seeded Marcelo Ríos won the singles title.

== Finals ==
=== Singles ===
(Chile) Marcelo Ríos defeated (Argentina) Mariano Zabaleta, 4–4, retired.

=== Doubles ===
(Australia) Andrew Florent / (Russia) Andrei Olhovskiy defeated (South Africa) Brent Haygarth / (South Africa) Robbie Koenig, 5–7, 6–4, 7–5.
