= 2000 Generali Open – Singles =

Singles
- 2000 Generali Open

Final
- Champion: (Spain) Àlex Corretja
- Runner-up: (Spain) Emilio Benfele Álvarez
- Score: 6–3, 6–1, 3–0, retired

Details
- Draw: 48 (4WC/6Q/3LL)
- Seeds: 16

Events
Singles	Doubles
- Austrian Open Kitzbühel

Albert Costa was the 2-time defending champion, but lost in the third round to Francisco Clavet.

Second-seeded Àlex Corretja won the title after Emilio Benfele Álvarez was forced to retire due to an injury. The score was 6–3, 6–1, 3–0.

== Seeds ==
All seeds received a bye to the second round.

1. (Russia) Yevgeny Kafelnikov (quarterfinals)
2. (Spain) Àlex Corretja (champion)
3. (Russia) Marat Safin (second round)
4. (Ecuador) Nicolás Lapentti (quarterfinals)
5. (n/a)
6. (Morocco) Younes El Aynaoui (second round, retired)
7. (Spain) Albert Costa (third round)
8. (Spain) Fernando Vicente (second round)
9. (Argentina) Mariano Zabaleta (quarterfinals)
10. (Spain) Francisco Clavet (semifinals)
11. (Spain) Albert Portas (second round)
12. (Spain) Carlos Moyá (second round)
13. (Czech Republic) Sláva Doseděl (third round)
14. (United States) Jeff Tarango (second round)
15. (n/a)
16. (Germany) Rainer Schüttler (second round)

== Draw ==
Key

- Q = Qualifier
- WC = Wild card
- LL = Lucky loser
- Alt = Alternate
- ITF = ITF entry
- PR = Protected ranking
- SR = Special ranking
- SE = Special exempt
- JE = Junior exempt
- JR = Junior Accelerator Programme entrant
- CO = College Accelerator Programme entrant
- NG = Next Gen Accelerator Program entrant
- w/o = Walkover
- r = Retired
- d = Defaulted

=== Finals ===
Quarterfinals
1	(Russia) Yevgeny Kafelnikov	3	2
10	(Spain) Francisco Clavet	6	6
4	(Ecuador) Nicolás Lapentti	4	6	6^{1}
(Spain) Emilio Benfele Álvarez	6	4	7^{7}
(Spain) Alberto Martín	5	6	4
(Argentina) Agustín Calleri	7	4	6
9	(Argentina) Mariano Zabaleta	3	0
2	(Spain) Àlex Corretja	6	6

Semifinals
10	(Spain) Francisco Clavet	3	5
(Spain) Emilio Benfele Álvarez	6	7
(Argentina) Agustín Calleri	3	7^{7}	2
2	(Spain) Àlex Corretja	6	6^{3}	6

Final
(Spain) Emilio Benfele Álvarez	3	1	0^{r}
2	(Spain) Àlex Corretja	6	6	3

=== Top half ===
==== Section 1 ====
First round
(Argentina) H Gumy	6	6
(Brazil) A Sá	3	4
(Armenia) S Sargsian	3	6	6
WC	(Austria) J Melzer	6	3	1
(Spain) Á López Morón	1	4
(Spain) A Berasategui	6	6
Q	(France) PH Mathieu	7^{7}	6
(Bulgaria) O Stanoytchev	6^{0}	1

Second round
1	(Russia) Y Kafelnikov	6	2	6
(Argentina) H Gumy	4	6	4
(Armenia) S Sargsian	1	6	6
LL	(Austria) H Wiltschnig	6	3	0
10	(Spain) F Clavet	6	7
(Spain) A Berasategui	0	5
Q	(France) PH Mathieu	4	6^{3}
7	(Spain) A Costa	6	7^{7}

Third round
1	(Russia) Y Kafelnikov	6	4	6
(Armenia) S Sargsian	4	6	4
10	(Spain) F Clavet	4	6	6
7	(Spain) A Costa	6	3	2

Quarterfinals
1	(Russia) Y Kafelnikov	3	2
10	(Spain) F Clavet	6	6

==== Section 2 ====
First round
Q	(Czech Republic) R Vašek	3	3
(Switzerland) M Kratochvil	6	6
PR	(Uruguay) M Filippini	1	3
(Czech Republic) B Ulihrach	6	6
(France) T Guardiola	6^{6}	4
(Romania) A Voinea	7^{8}	6
(Austria) M Hipfl	4	0^{r}
(Spain) E Benfele Álvarez	6	1

Second round
4	(Ecuador) N Lapentti	6	6
(Switzerland) M Kratochvil	3	2
(Czech Republic) B Ulihrach	6	6
14	(United States) J Tarango	3	2
12	(Spain) C Moyá	6	3	4
(Romania) A Voinea	2	6	6
(Spain) E Benfele Álvarez	6	6
LL	(Brazil) F Costa	4	3

Third round
4	(Ecuador) N Lapentti	6	6
(Czech Republic) B Ulihrach	1	0
(Romania) A Voinea	2	4
(Spain) E Benfele Álvarez	6	6

Quarterfinals
4	(Ecuador) N Lapentti	4	6	6^{1}
(Spain) E Benfele Álvarez	6	4	7^{7}

=== Bottom half ===
==== Section 3 ====
First round
LL	(Argentina) F Cabello	0	2
(Spain) A Martín	6	6
(Australia) W Arthurs	6^{3}	6^{5}
(Chile) N Massú	7^{7}	7^{7}
(Argentina) F Browne	4	6^{1}
(Brazil) F Meligeni	6	7^{7}
Q	(Argentina) H Moretti	2	2
(Argentina) A Calleri	6	6

Second round
6	(Morocco) Y El Aynaoui	6^{4}	2^{r}
(Spain) A Martín	7^{7}	3
(Chile) N Massú	6	6
11	(Spain) A Portas	4	4
13	(Czech Republic) S Doseděl	6	6
(Brazil) F Meligeni	1	3
(Argentina) A Calleri	6	7^{7}
3	(Russia) M Safin	4	6^{4}

Third round
(Spain) A Martín	5	6	6
(Chile) N Massú	7	1	1
13	(Czech Republic) S Doseděl	0	1
(Argentina) A Calleri	6	6

Quarterfinals
(Spain) A Martín	5	6	4
(Argentina) A Calleri	7	4	6

==== Section 4 ====
First round
Q	(Argentina) G Coria	6^{4}	3
Q	(Italy) F Luzzi	7^{7}	6
(Spain) J Balcells	2	2
(Norway) C Ruud	6	6
WC	(Austria) A Fasching	3	4
(Croatia) I Ljubičić	6	6
Q	(Chile) F González	4	6	6
WC	(Austria) C Trimmel	6	2	0

Second round
8	(Spain) F Vicente	6^{3}	7^{7}	6^{5}
Q	(Italy) F Luzzi	7^{7}	6^{2}	7^{7}
(Norway) C Ruud	3	2
9	(Argentina) M Zabaleta	6	6
16/WC	(Germany) R Schüttler	4	2
(Croatia) I Ljubičić	6	6
Q	(Chile) F González	1	2
2	(Spain) À Corretja	6	6

Third round
Q	(Italy) F Luzzi	3	2
9	(Argentina) M Zabaleta	6	6
(Croatia) I Ljubičić	6^{12}	4
2	(Spain) À Corretja	7^{14}	6

Quarterfinals
9	(Argentina) M Zabaleta	3	0
2	(Spain) À Corretja	6	6
