= 2001 Generali Open – Doubles =

Doubles
- 2001 Generali Open

Final
- Champions: (Spain) Àlex Corretja (Argentina) Luis Lobo
- Runners-up: (Sweden) Simon Aspelin (Australia) Andrew Kratzmann
- Score: 6–1, 6–4

Details
- Draw: 24
- Seeds: 8

Events
Singles	Doubles
- Generali Open

Pablo Albano and Cyril Suk were the defending champions but they competed with different partners that year, Albano with Lucas Arnold and Suk with Marius Barnard.

Albano and Arnold lost in the second round to Wolfgang Schranz and Thomas Strengberger.

Barnard and Suk lost in the semifinals to Àlex Corretja and Luis Lobo.

Corretja and Lobo won in the final 6–1, 6–4 against Simon Aspelin and Andrew Kratzmann.

== Seeds ==
Champion seeds are indicated in bold text while text in italics indicates the round in which those seeds were eliminated. All eight seeded teams received byes to the second round.

1. (Czech Republic) Petr Pála / (Czech Republic) Pavel Vízner (quarterfinals)
2. (Australia) Joshua Eagle / (Australia) Andrew Florent (quarterfinals)
3. (Australia) Michael Hill / (United States) Jeff Tarango (quarterfinals)
4. (Argentina) Pablo Albano / (Argentina) Lucas Arnold (second round)
5. (South Africa) Marius Barnard / (Czech Republic) Cyril Suk (semifinals)
6. (Czech Republic) Tomáš Cibulec / (Czech Republic) Leoš Friedl (second round)
7. (South Africa) Chris Haggard / (Argentina) Daniel Orsanic (second round)
8. (Spain) Tomás Carbonell / (Argentina) Mariano Hood (second round)

== Draw ==
Key

- Q = Qualifier
- WC = Wild card
- LL = Lucky loser
- Alt = Alternate
- ITF = ITF entry
- PR = Protected ranking
- SR = Special ranking
- SE = Special exempt
- JE = Junior exempt
- JR = Junior Accelerator Programme entrant
- CO = College Accelerator Programme entrant
- NG = Next Gen Accelerator Program entrant
- w/o = Walkover
- r = Retired
- d = Defaulted

=== Final ===
Final

WC
- (Spain) **Àlex Corretja**
- (Argentina) **Luis Lobo**
**6**
**6**

- (Sweden) Simon Aspelin
- (Australia) Andrew Kratzmann
1
4

=== Top half ===
First round

Second round

Quarterfinals

Semifinals

1
- (Czech Republic) **P Pála**
- (Czech Republic) **P Vízner**
**7**
4
**6**

WC
- (Argentina) G Cañas
- (Germany) R Schüttler
3
**6**
3

WC
- (Austria) O Marach
- (Austria) A Peya
5
**6**
2

WC
- (Austria) **O Marach**
- (Austria) **A Peya**
**6**
3
**6**

1
- (Czech Republic) P Pála
- (Czech Republic) P Vízner
**6**
6^{5}
6^{8}

WC
- (Austria) S Koubek
- (Romania) A Pavel
4
4

5
- (South Africa) **M Barnard**
- (Czech Republic) **C Suk**
4
**7^{7}**
**7^{10}**

- (Germany) **K Braasch**
- (Germany) **J Knippschild**
**6**
**6**

- (Germany) K Braasch
- (Germany) J Knippschild
3
2

5
- (South Africa) **M Barnard**
- (Czech Republic) **C Suk**
**6**
**6**

5
- (South Africa) M Barnard
- (Czech Republic) C Suk
3
5

WC
- (Spain) **À Corretja**
- (Argentina) **L Lobo**
**6**
**7**

4
- (Argentina) P Albano
- (Argentina) L Arnold
**7^{8}**
4
4

- (North Macedonia) A Kitinov
- (Sweden) J Landsberg
6^{6}
3

WC
- (Austria) **W Schranz**
- (Austria) **T Strengberger**
6^{6}
**6**
**6**

WC
- (Austria) **W Schranz**
- (Austria) **T Strengberger**
**7^{8}**
**6**

WC
- (Austria) W Schranz
- (Austria) T Strengberger
3
1

WC
- (Spain) **À Corretja**
- (Argentina) **L Lobo**
**6**
4
**6**

WC
- (Spain) **À Corretja**
- (Argentina) **L Lobo**
**6**
**6**

- (Austria) J Knowle
- (Switzerland) L Manta
3
**6**
2

WC
- (Spain) **À Corretja**
- (Argentina) **L Lobo**
1
**6**
**6**

6
- (Czech Republic) T Cibulec
- (Czech Republic) L Friedl
**6**
3
4

=== Bottom half ===
First round

Second round

Quarterfinals

Semifinals

8
- (Spain) T Carbonell
- (Argentina) M Hood
4
4

- (Sweden) **S Aspelin**
- (Australia) **A Kratzmann**
**6**
**6**

- (Sweden) **S Aspelin**
- (Australia) **A Kratzmann**
**6**
**6**

- (France) J Boutter
- (United States) D Bowen
3
1

- (Sweden) **S Aspelin**
- (Australia) **A Kratzmann**
**6**
**6**

- (Spain) **J I Carrasco**
- (South Africa) **J Weir-Smith**
**6**
3
**6**

3
- (Australia) M Hill
- (United States) J Tarango
2
4

- (Argentina) G Etlis
- (Argentina) M Rodríguez
3
**6**
3

- (Spain) J I Carrasco
- (South Africa) J Weir-Smith
**6**
3
5

3
- (Australia) **M Hill**
- (United States) **J Tarango**
3
**6**
**7**

- (Sweden) **S Aspelin**
- (Australia) **A Kratzmann**
2
**6**
**6**

- (Germany) M-K Goellner
- (Russia) A Olhovskiy
**6**
4
2

7
- (South Africa) C Haggard
- (Argentina) D Orsanic
3
**6**
3

- (Germany) **M-K Goellner**
- (Russia) **A Olhovskiy**
**7^{7}**
**7**

- (Germany) **M-K Goellner**
- (Russia) **A Olhovskiy**
**6**
4
**6**

- (Italy) M Bertolini
- (Australia) P Tramacchi
6^{2}
5

- (Germany) **M-K Goellner**
- (Russia) **A Olhovskiy**
w/o

WC
- (Spain) J C Ferrero
- (Spain) A Martín
5
4

2
- (Australia) J Eagle
- (Australia) A Florent

- (Czech Republic) **P Luxa**
- (Czech Republic) **R Štěpánek**
**7**
**6**

- (Czech Republic) P Luxa
- (Czech Republic) R Štěpánek
4
3

2
- (Australia) **J Eagle**
- (Australia) **A Florent**
**6**
**6**
