= 1998 International Raiffeisen Grand Prix – Singles =

Singles
- 1998 International Raiffeisen Grand Prix

Final
- Champion: (Chile) Marcelo Ríos
- Runner-up: (United States) Vincent Spadea
- Score: 6–2, 6–0

Events
Singles	men	women
Doubles	men	women
← 1997 ·	International Raiffeisen Grand Prix	· 1999 →

The 1998 International Raiffeisen Grand Prix was a men's tennis tournament played on Clay in St. Pölten, Austria that was part of the International Series of the 1998 ATP Tour. It was the eighteenth edition of the tournament and was held from 18–24 May 1998.

== Seeds ==
Champion seeds are indicated in bold text while text in italics indicates the round in which those seeds were eliminated.

1. (Chile) **Marcelo Ríos (champion)**
2. (Australia) Patrick Rafter (first round)
3. (Austria) Thomas Muster (quarterfinals)
4. (Italy) Andrea Gaudenzi (semifinals)
5. (France) Guillaume Raoux (first round)
6. (Spain) Francisco Clavet (quarterfinals)
7. (Spain) Galo Blanco (quarterfinals)
8. (Australia) Richard Fromberg (second round)

== Draw ==
=== Key ===
- Q = Qualifier
- WC = Wild card
- LL = Lucky loser
- Alt = Alternate
- ITF = ITF entry
- PR = Protected ranking
- SR = Special ranking
- SE = Special exempt
- JE = Junior exempt
- JR = Junior Accelerator Programme entrant
- CO = College Accelerator Programme entrant
- NG = Next Gen Accelerator Program entrant
- w/o = Walkover
- r = Retired
- d = Defaulted

=== Finals ===
Semifinals
1	**(Chile) Marcelo Ríos**	**6**	**6**
4	(Italy) Andrea Gaudenzi	4	3
(Uruguay) Marcelo Filippini	2	0
**(United States) Vince Spadea**	**6**	**6**

Final
1	**(Chile) Marcelo Ríos**	**6**	**6**
(United States) Vince Spadea	2	0

=== Top half ===
First round
1	**(Chile) M Ríos**	**6**	**6**
(Australia) S Draper	1	3
**(Germany) M-K Goellner**	3	**7**	**6**
(Zimbabwe) W Black	**6**	6^{3}	1
**(Sweden) T Nydahl**	**6**	5	**6**
(Spain) Á Calatrava	4	**7**	2
7	**(Spain) G Blanco**	**6**	**7**
(Italy) M Meneschincheri	3	6^{3}
4	**(Italy) A Gaudenzi**	**6**	**7**
(United States) J-M Gambill	3	5
**(Italy) D Nargiso**	**6**	**6**
(Argentina) H Gumy	4	2
**(Spain) J Sánchez**	**6**	**6**
(Italy) G Pozzi	2	3
6	**(Spain) F Clavet**	**6**	**6**
(United States) S Campbell	3	1

Second round
1	**(Chile) M Ríos**	**6**	**6**
(Germany) M-K Goellner	4	3
(Sweden) T Nydahl	3	5
7	**(Spain) G Blanco**	**6**	**7**
4	**(Italy) A Gaudenzi**	**6**	4	**6**
(Italy) D Nargiso	2	**6**	3
(Spain) J Sánchez	**7**	5	0
6	**(Spain) F Clavet**	6	**7**	**6**

Quarterfinals
1	**(Chile) M Ríos**	**6**	**6**
7	(Spain) G Blanco	2	2
4	**(Italy) A Gaudenzi**	**6**	**6**
6	(Spain) F Clavet	3	4

Semifinals
1	**(Chile) M Ríos**	**6**	**6**
4	(Italy) A Gaudenzi	4	3

=== Bottom half ===
First round
**(Uruguay) M Filippini**	**6**	**6**
5	(France) G Raoux	2	2
**(Spain) Ó Serrano**	**6**	**6**
(Austria) M Hipfl	4	3
**(Costa Rica) JA Marín**	**7**	**6**
(Ecuador) N Lapentti	5	3
3	**(Austria) T Muster**	4	**6**	**7**
(Austria) C Trimmel	**6**	1	5
8	**(Australia) R Fromberg**	6^{3}	**7**	**6**
(South Africa) G Stafford	**7**	6^{1}	1
**(United States) V Spadea**	**7**	**7**
(Denmark) K Carlsen	5	5
**(Netherlands) S Schalken**	**6**	**6**
(Spain) JA Viloca	1	3
**(Zimbabwe) B Black**	**6**	**6**
2	(Australia) P Rafter	3	4

Second round
**(Uruguay) M Filippini**	**7**	**6**
(Spain) Ó Serrano	6^{4}	3
(Costa Rica) JA Marín	3	**7**	2
3	**(Austria) T Muster**	**6**	6^{4}	**6**
8	(Australia) R Fromberg	**6**	3	3
**(United States) V Spadea**	4	**6**	**6**
**(Netherlands) S Schalken**	**6**	**6**
(Zimbabwe) B Black	1	4

Quarterfinals
**(Uruguay) M Filippini**	**6**	**6**
3	(Austria) T Muster	3	4
**(United States) V Spadea**	**7**	**6**
(Netherlands) S Schalken	6^{3}	1

Semifinals
(Uruguay) M Filippini	2	0
**(United States) V Spadea**	**6**	**6**
