= 2001 Generali Open =

- Date: 23–29 July
- Edition: 46th
- Category: International Series Gold
- Draw: 48S / 24D
- Prize money: $800,000
- Location: Kitzbühel, Austria
- Venue: Tennis Stadium Kitzbühel

Champions

Singles
- (Ecuador) Nicolás Lapentti

Doubles
- (Spain) Àlex Corretja / (Argentina) Luis Lobo
← 2000 ·	Austrian Open Kitzbühel	· 2002 →

The 2001 Generali Open was a men's tennis tournament played on outdoor clay courts at the Tennis Stadium Kitzbühel in Kitzbühel, Austria that was part of the International Series Gold of the 2001 ATP Tour. It was the 46th edition of the tournament and was held from 23 July until 29 July 2001. Sixth-seeded Nicolás Lapentti won the singles title.

== Finals ==
=== Singles ===
(Ecuador) Nicolás Lapentti defeated (Spain) Albert Costa 1–6, 6–4, 7–5, 7–5

- It was Lapentti's only title of the year and the 7th of his career.

=== Doubles ===
(Spain) Àlex Corretja / (Argentina) Luis Lobo defeated (Sweden) Simon Aspelin / (Australia) Andrew Kratzmann 6–1, 6–4

- It was Corretja's 2nd title of the year and the 18th of his career. It was Lobo's only title of the year and the 11th of his career.
