= 1996 Oporto Open – Singles =

Singles
- 1996 Oporto Open
- 1995 Champion: (Spain) Alberto Berasategui

Final
- Champion: (Spain) Félix Mantilla
- Runner-up: (Argentina) Hernán Gumy
- Score: 6–7^{(5–7)}, 6–4, 6–3

Details
- Draw: 32
- Seeds: 8

Events
Singles	Doubles
← 1995 ·	Oporto Open

The 1996 Oporto Open – Singles was an event of the 1996 Oporto Open men's tennis tournament which was part of World Series of the 1996 ATP Tour and held from 10 June until 16 June 1996 in Porto, Portugal. The draw consisted of 32 players and eight of them were seeded.

Alberto Berasategui was the defending champion but lost in the first round to Mikael Tillström.

Unseeded Félix Mantilla won in the final 6–7^{(5–7)}, 6–4, 6–3 against sixth-seeded Hernán Gumy.

== Seeds ==
A champion seed is indicated in bold text while text in italics indicates the round in which that seed was eliminated.

1. (Spain) Carlos Moyá (quarterfinals)
2. (Spain) Carlos Costa (first round)
3. (Spain) Alberto Berasategui (first round)
4. (Spain) Francisco Clavet (second round)
5. (Spain) Tomás Carbonell (quarterfinals)
6. (Argentina) Hernán Gumy (final)
7. (Belgium) Filip Dewulf (first round)
8. (Morocco) Karim Alami (first round)

== Draw ==
=== Key ===
- Q = Qualifier
- WC = Wild card
- LL = Lucky loser
- Alt = Alternate
- ITF = ITF entry
- PR = Protected ranking
- SR = Special ranking
- SE = Special exempt
- JE = Junior exempt
- JR = Junior Accelerator Programme entrant
- CO = College Accelerator Programme entrant
- NG = Next Gen Accelerator Program entrant
- w/o = Walkover
- r = Retired
- d = Defaulted

First round
1	(Spain) **C Moyá**	**7^{7}**	**6**
Q	(Spain) J Alonso	6^{3}	2
WC	(Spain) E Sánchez	1	2
Q	(Portugal) **B Mota**	**6**	**6**
(Belgium) **J Van Herck**	**6**	**6**
(Germany) L Burgsmüller	3	3
(Italy) **O Camporese**	**6**	**6**
7	(Belgium) F Dewulf	0	3
3	(Spain) A Berasategui	3	**6**	0
(Sweden) **M Tillström**	**6**	3	**6**
(Spain) **F Mantilla**	**6**	4	**6**
(Spain) G Blanco	2	**6**	2
(Belgium) K Goossens	**6**	1	3
Q	(Spain) **I Truyol**	3	**6**	**6**
(Portugal) N Marques	5	**7**	5
5	(Spain) **T Carbonell**	**7**	5	**7**
6	(Argentina) **H Gumy**	**6**	**6**
(Portugal) J Cunha e Silva	2	0
(Russia) **A Chesnokov**	**6**	**7^{7}**
(Spain) J Arrese	4	6^{4}
WC	(Portugal) E Couto	1	4
(Italy) **S Pescosolido**	**6**	**6**
(Morocco) Y El Aynaoui	1	**6**	1
4	(Spain) **F Clavet**	**6**	4	**6**
8	(Morocco) K Alami	2	2
(Australia) **R Fromberg**	**6**	**6**
(Ecuador) **N Lapentti**	3	**7^{8}**	**6**
Q	(Spain) F Roig	**6**	6^{6}	1
(Hungary) **S Noszály**	**7^{7}**	**6**
WC	(Spain) R Carretero	6^{3}	2
(Norway) **C Ruud**	2	**6**	**6**
2	(Spain) C Costa	**6**	3	3

Second round
1	(Spain) **C Moyá**	**6**	3	**7**
Q	(Portugal) B Mota	1	**6**	5
(Belgium) **J Van Herck**	**6**	**6**
(Italy) O Camporese	4	2
(Sweden) M Tillström	3	5
(Spain) **F Mantilla**	**6**	**7**
Q	(Spain) I Truyol	4	3
5	(Spain) **T Carbonell**	**6**	**6**
6	(Argentina) **H Gumy**	**6**	**6**
(Russia) A Chesnokov	3	2
(Italy) **S Pescosolido**	**6**	4	**7^{8}**
4	(Spain) F Clavet	1	**6**	6^{6}
(Australia) **R Fromberg**	**6**	**7**
(Ecuador) N Lapentti	2	5
(Hungary) S Noszály	1	1
(Norway) **C Ruud**	**6**	**6**

Quarterfinals
1	(Spain) **C Moyá**	**6**	**6**
(Belgium) J Van Herck	1	2
(Spain) **F Mantilla**	**7^{11}**	**6**
5	(Spain) T Carbonell	6^{9}	3
6	(Argentina) **H Gumy**	**6**	**6**
(Italy) S Pescosolido	4	2
(Australia) R Fromberg	2	**6**	4
(Norway) **C Ruud**	**6**	2	**6**

Semifinals
1	(Spain) C Moyá	0	4
(Spain) **F Mantilla**	**6**	**6**
6	(Argentina) **H Gumy**	**7^{7}**	**6**
(Norway) C Ruud	6^{5}	2

Final
(Spain) **Félix Mantilla**	6^{5}	**6**	**6**
6	(Argentina) Hernán Gumy	**7^{7}**	4	3
