= 1998 International Raiffeisen Grand Prix =

- Date: 18–24 May
- Edition: 18th
- Category: International Series
- Surface: Clay / outdoor
- Location: St. Pölten, Austria

Champions

Singles
- (Chile) Marcelo Ríos

Doubles
- (United States) Jim Grabb / (Australia) David Macpherson
← 1997 ·	International Raiffeisen Grand Prix	· 1999 →

The 1998 International Raiffeisen Grand Prix was a men's tennis tournament played on Clay in St. Pölten, Austria that was part of the International Series of the 1998 ATP Tour. It was the eighteenth edition of the tournament and was held from 18 May until 24 May 1998. First-seeded Marcelo Ríos won the singles title.

== Finals ==
=== Singles ===
(Chile) Marcelo Ríos defeated (United States) Vincent Spadea, 6–2, 6–0.

=== Doubles ===
(United States) Jim Grabb / (Australia) David Macpherson defeated (South Africa) David Adams / (Zimbabwe) Wayne Black, 6–4, 6–4.
