= 1998 Australian Open – Men's doubles =

Tennis tournament

Men's doubles
- 1998 Australian Open

Final
- Champions: (Sweden) Jonas Björkman (Netherlands) Jacco Eltingh
- Runners-up: (Australia) Todd Woodbridge (Australia) Mark Woodforde
- Score: 6–2, 5–7, 2–6, 6–4, 6–3

Details
- Draw: 64
- Seeds: 16

Events
Singles	men	women		boys	girls
Doubles	men	women	mixed	boys	girls
WC Singles	men	women	quad
WC Doubles	men	women	quad
Legends	men	women	mixed
- Australian Open

Jonas Björkman and Jacco Eltingh defeated the defending champions Todd Woodbridge and Mark Woodforde in the final, 6–2, 5–7, 2–6, 6–4, 6–3 to win the men's doubles tennis title at the 1998 Australian Open.

== Seeds ==
Champion seeds are indicated in bold text while text in italics indicates the round in which those seeds were eliminated.

1. (Australia) Todd Woodbridge / (Australia) Mark Woodforde (final)
2. (India) Mahesh Bhupathi / (India) Leander Paes (semifinals)
3. (United States) Alex O'Brien / (United States) Jonathan Stark (third round)
4. (South Africa) Ellis Ferreira / (United States) Rick Leach (quarterfinals)
5. (Sweden) **Jonas Björkman** / (Netherlands) **Jacco Eltingh (champions)**
6. (The Bahamas) Mark Knowles / (Canada) Daniel Nestor (first round)
7. (Canada) Sébastien Lareau / (South Africa) Piet Norval (first round)
8. (Argentina) Luis Lobo / (Spain) Javier Sánchez (quarterfinals)
9. (Australia) Mark Philippoussis / (Australia) Patrick Rafter (first round)
10. (United States) Donald Johnson / (United States) Francisco Montana (third round)
11. (Australia) Sandon Stolle / (Czech Republic) Cyril Suk (third round)
12. (United States) Patrick Galbraith / (New Zealand) Brett Steven (quarterfinals)
13. (France) Olivier Delaître / (France) Fabrice Santoro (third round)
14. (Argentina) Lucas Arnold Ker / (Argentina) Daniel Orsanic (first round)
15. (South Africa) David Adams / (North Macedonia) Aleksandar Kitinov (second round)
16. (Zimbabwe) Byron Black / (Sweden) Nicklas Kulti (first round)

== Draw ==
Key

- Q = Qualifier
- WC = Wild card
- LL = Lucky loser
- Alt = Alternate
- ITF = ITF entry
- PR = Protected ranking
- SR = Special ranking
- SE = Special exempt
- JE = Junior exempt
- JR = Junior Accelerator Programme entrant
- CO = College Accelerator Programme entrant
- NG = Next Gen Accelerator Program entrant
- w/o = Walkover
- r = Retired
- d = Defaulted

=== Finals ===
Quarterfinals
1	(Australia) Todd Woodbridge (Australia) Mark Woodforde	6	6	7
8	(Argentina) Luis Lobo (Spain) Javier Sánchez	3	4	6^{1}
(Australia) David Macpherson (United States) David Wheaton	7	6^{3}	3	7	13
12	(United States) Patrick Galbraith (New Zealand) Brett Steven	6^{5}	7	6	6^{6}	11
5	(Sweden) Jonas Björkman (Netherlands) Jacco Eltingh	6	6	7
4	(South Africa) Ellis Ferreira (United States) Rick Leach	2	4	5
(United States) Justin Gimelstob (United States) Brian MacPhie	6^{2}	3	2
2	(India) Mahesh Bhupathi (India) Leander Paes	7	6	6

Semifinals
1	(Australia) Todd Woodbridge (Australia) Mark Woodforde	6	7	6
(Australia) David Macpherson (United States) David Wheaton	4	5	3
5	(Sweden) Jonas Björkman (Netherlands) Jacco Eltingh	4	7	6	3	6
2	(India) Mahesh Bhupathi (India) Leander Paes	6	5	3	6	3

Final
1	(Australia) Todd Woodbridge (Australia) Mark Woodforde	2	7	6	4	3
5	(Sweden) Jonas Björkman (Netherlands) Jacco Eltingh	6	5	2	6	6

=== Top half ===
==== Section 1 ====
First round
1	(Australia) T Woodbridge (Australia) M Woodforde	6	6
(United States) M Keil (United States) T. J. Middleton	4	4
(Australia) G Doyle (Australia) T Larkham	6	6
(Spain) A Berasategui (Mexico) D Roditi	4	3
(South Africa) J-L de Jager (South Africa) R Koenig	7	5	6
(Netherlands) T Nijssen (Czech Republic) T Anzari	5	7	4
(France) J-P Fleurian (Sweden) P Nyborg	6	6
16	(Zimbabwe) B Black (Sweden) N Kulti	3	2
(Argentina) P Albano (Spain) À Corretja	6	3	7
9	(Australia) M Philippoussis (Australia) P Rafter	3	6	5
(United States) D Randall (United States) J Waite	7	6
(United States) D Flach (United States) K Kinnear	5	4
(Netherlands) T Kempers (Netherlands) M Oosting	6	4	6
(Socialist Federal Republic of Yugoslavia) D Petrović (Australia) G Silcock	3	6	3
8	(Argentina) L Lobo (Spain) J Sánchez	6	6
(Netherlands) J Siemerink (Czech Republic) D Vacek	4	2

Second round
1	(Australia) T Woodbridge (Australia) M Woodforde	6	6
(Australia) G Doyle (Australia) T Larkham	4	2
(South Africa) J-L de Jager (South Africa) R Koenig	7	3	6
(France) J-P Fleurian (Sweden) P Nyborg	5	6	4
(Argentina) P Albano (Spain) À Corretja	7	0	6
(United States) D Randall (United States) J Waite	5	6	3
(Netherlands) T Kempers (Netherlands) M Oosting	6	3	16
8	(Argentina) L Lobo (Spain) J Sánchez	3	6	18

Third round
1	(Australia) T Woodbridge (Australia) M Woodforde	6	6
(South Africa) J-L de Jager (South Africa) R Koenig	1	3
(Argentina) P Albano (Spain) À Corretja	4	6	8
8	(Argentina) L Lobo (Spain) J Sánchez	6	2	10

Quarterfinals
1	(Australia) T Woodbridge (Australia) M Woodforde	6	6	7
8	(Argentina) L Lobo (Spain) J Sánchez	3	4	6^{1}

==== Section 2 ====
First round
3	(United States) A O'Brien (United States) J Stark	7	7
(South Africa) M Barnard (South Africa) B Haygarth	6^{3}	5
(Australia) P Kilderry (Ecuador) N Lapentti	6	6
(Netherlands) S Groen (Croatia) G Ivanišević	3	2
(Australia) D Macpherson (United States) D Wheaton	6	6
(South Africa) M Ondruska (United States) GV Emburgh	4	4
(Morocco) K Alami (Belgium) T Vanhoudt	2	6	6
14	(Argentina) L Arnold (Argentina) D Orsanic	6	3	2
12	(United States) P Galbraith (New Zealand) B Steven	6	6
(Netherlands) S Noteboom (Netherlands) F Wibier	2	4
(Australia) S Draper (Australia) J Stoltenberg	6	7
(Spain) J Burillo (Spain) A Martín	3	6^{4}
(Italy) C Brandi (Italy) F Messori	6	6
(United Kingdom) D Sapsford (United Kingdom) C Wilkinson	2	4
(Germany) M-K Goellner (Germany) D Prinosil	7	7
6	(The Bahamas) M Knowles (Canada) D Nestor	5	5

Second round
3	(United States) A O'Brien (United States) J Stark	4	7	6
(Australia) P Kilderry (Ecuador) N Lapentti	6	6^{4}	2
(Australia) D Macpherson (United States) D Wheaton	6	6
(Morocco) K Alami (Belgium) T Vanhoudt	3	4
12	(United States) P Galbraith (New Zealand) B Steven	6	6
(Australia) S Draper (Australia) J Stoltenberg	2	;3
(Italy) C Brandi (Italy) F Messori	4	4
(Germany) M-K Goellner (Germany) D Prinosil	6	6

Third round
3	(United States) A O'Brien (United States) J Stark	6^{2}	6^{3}
(Australia) D Macpherson (United States) D Wheaton	7	7
12	(United States) P Galbraith (New Zealand) B Steven	6^{6}	6	6
(Germany) M-K Goellner (Germany) D Prinosil	7	2	2

Quarterfinals
(Australia) D Macpherson (United States) D Wheaton	7	6^{3}	3	7	13
12	(United States) P Galbraith (New Zealand) B Steven	6^{5}	7	6	6^{6}	11

=== Bottom half ===
==== Section 3 ====
First round
5	(Sweden) J Björkman (Netherlands) J Eltingh	6	7
(Germany) K Braasch (Germany) M Kohlmann	3	5
(Sweden) J Apell (Zimbabwe) W Black	7	5	6
(South Africa) G Stafford (Zimbabwe) K Ullyett	5	7	1
(South Africa) N Godwin (South Africa) C Haggard	6	4	9
(United States) B Coupe (South Africa) P Rosner	4	6	7
11	(Australia) S Stolle (Czech Republic) C Suk	6	6
(Germany) J Knippschild (United States) J Tarango	2	4
13	(France) O Delaître (France) F Santoro	7	6
(Socialist Federal Republic of Yugoslavia) N Djordjevic (Brazil) A Sá	5	4
(United States) J Grabb (United States) R Reneberg	6^{5}	6	6
(United States) D Bowen (Portugal) J Cunha e Silva	7	2	4
(Brazil) G Kuerten (United States) M Sell	6	7
(Sweden) R Bergh (South Africa) B Talbot	4	6^{5}
4	(South Africa) E Ferreira (United States) R Leach	6	6
(Egypt) T El-Sawy (Hungary) G Köves	4	2

Second round
5	(Sweden) J Björkman (Netherlands) J Eltingh	6	6
(Sweden) J Apell (Zimbabwe) W Black	4	4
(South Africa) N Godwin (South Africa) C Haggard	2	2
11	(Australia) S Stolle (Czech Republic) C Suk	6	6
13	(France) O Delaître (France) F Santoro	4	6	6
(United States) J Grabb (United States) R Reneberg	6	2	4
(Brazil) G Kuerten (United States) M Sell	3	4
4	(South Africa) E Ferreira (United States) R Leach	6	6

Third round
5	(Sweden) J Björkman (Netherlands) J Eltingh	6	3	6
11	(Australia) S Stolle (Czech Republic) C Suk	3	6	4
13	(France) O Delaître (France) F Santoro	6	2	1
4	(South Africa) E Ferreira (United States) R Leach	3	6	6

Quarterfinals
5	(Sweden) J Björkman (Netherlands) J Eltingh	6	6	7
4	(South Africa) E Ferreira (United States) R Leach	2	4	5

==== Section 4 ====
First round
(United States) J Gimelstob (United States) B MacPhie	7	6^{3}	6
7	(Canada) S Lareau (South Africa) P Norval	6^{4}	7	3
(Australia) J Eagle (Australia) A Florent	6	6
(Australia) M Tebbutt (Sweden) M Tillström	1	3
(Czech Republic) S Doseděl (Belgium) L Pimek	6	6
(United Kingdom) T Henman (Switzerland) M Rosset	2	4
10	(United States) D Johnson (United States) F Montana	6	3	6
(Spain) J Alonso (United States) S Davis	4	6	2
15	(South Africa) D Adams (North Macedonia) A Kitinov	7	6^{6}	6
(Australia) R Fromberg (Australia) J Holmes	6^{5}	7	3
(Australia) L Hewitt (Australia) L Smith	6	6
(Australia) J-D Gould (Australia) J Kerr	3	1
(Australia) W Arthurs (Australia) A Kratzmann	7	2	6
(Australia) B Ellwood (Australia) P Tramacchi	5	6	3
2	(India) M Bhupathi (India) L Paes	6	6
(Belarus) M Mirnyi (Armenia) S Sargsian	2	2

Second round
(United States) J Gimelstob (United States) B MacPhie	6	6
(Australia) J Eagle (Australia) A Florent	2	2
(Czech Republic) S Doseděl (Belgium) L Pimek	4	4
10	(United States) D Johnson (United States) F Montana	6	6
15	(South Africa) D Adams (North Macedonia) A Kitinov	3	7	12
(Australia) L Hewitt (Australia) L Smith	6	6^{4}	14
(Australia) W Arthurs (Australia) A Kratzmann	2	3
2	(India) M Bhupathi (India) L Paes	6	6

Third round
(United States) J Gimelstob (United States) B MacPhie	6	3	6
10	(United States) D Johnson (United States) F Montana	3	6	1
(Australia) L Hewitt (Australia) L Smith	0	6^{2}
2	(India) M Bhupathi (India) L Paes	6	7

Quarterfinals
(United States) J Gimelstob (United States) B MacPhie	6^{2}	3	2
2	(India) M Bhupathi (India) L Paes	7	6	6
