= 2001 Generali Open – Singles =

Singles
- 2001 Generali Open

Final
- Champion: (Ecuador) Nicolás Lapentti
- Runner-up: (Spain) Albert Costa
- Score: 1–6, 6–4, 7–5, 7–5

Details
- Draw: 48
- Seeds: 16

Events
Singles	Doubles
- Generali Open

Àlex Corretja was the defending champion but lost in the second round to Stefan Koubek.

Sixth-seeded Nicolás Lapentti won in the final 1–6, 6–4, 7–5, 7–5 against Albert Costa.

== Seeds ==
A champion seed is indicated in bold text while text in italics indicates the round in which that seed was eliminated. All sixteen seeds received a bye to the second round.

1. (Spain) Juan Carlos Ferrero (quarterfinals)
2. (Russia) Yevgeny Kafelnikov (third round)
3. (Spain) Àlex Corretja (second round)
4. (Argentina) Franco Squillari (third round)
5. (Argentina) Guillermo Coria (semifinals)
6. (Ecuador) **Nicolás Lapentti (champion)**
7. (Argentina) Guillermo Cañas (second round)
8. (Spain) Alberto Martín (third round)
9. (Argentina) Gastón Gaudio (third round)
10. (Spain) Álex Calatrava (third round)
11. (Romania) Andrei Pavel (quarterfinals)
12. (Australia) Wayne Arthurs (second round, retired)
13. (Germany) Rainer Schüttler (third round)
14. (Italy) ~~Andrea Gaudenzi~~ (withdrew because of a torn right leg muscle)
15. (Spain) Fernando Vicente (second round)
16. (Spain) Francisco Clavet (second round)

== Draw ==
Key

- Q = Qualifier
- WC = Wild card
- LL = Lucky loser
- Alt = Alternate
- ITF = ITF entry
- PR = Protected ranking
- SR = Special ranking
- SE = Special exempt
- JE = Junior exempt
- JR = Junior Accelerator Programme entrant
- CO = College Accelerator Programme entrant
- NG = Next Gen Accelerator Program entrant
- w/o = Walkover
- r = Retired
- d = Defaulted

=== Finals ===
Semifinals
WC/6	(Ecuador) **Nicolás Lapentti**	**6**	**6**
(Spain) Galo Blanco	2	4
5	(Argentina) Guillermo Coria	5	3
(Spain) **Albert Costa**	**7**	**6**

Final
WC/6	(Ecuador) **Nicolás Lapentti**	1	**6**	**7**	**7**
(Spain) Albert Costa	**6**	4	5	5

=== Top half ===
==== Section 1 ====
First round
Q	(Chile) F González	4	3
WC	(Austria) **A Peya**	**6**	**6**
(France) A Di Pasquale	4	4
(France) **J Boutter**	**6**	**6**
Q	(Germany) M Hantschk	5	6^{3}
Q	(Uzbekistan) **V Kutsenko**	**7**	**7^{7}**
(Spain) **J Díaz**	3
(France) J Golmard	**6**	r

Second round
1	(Spain) **J C Ferrero**	**6**	**6**
WC	(Austria) A Peya	2	1
(France) **J Boutter**	**6**	**6**
16	(Spain) F Clavet	1	2
9	(Argentina) **G Gaudio**	4	**7^{8}**	**6**
Q	(Uzbekistan) V Kutsenko	**6**	6^{6}	3
(Spain) J Díaz	0	5
WC/6	(Ecuador) **N Lapentti**	**6**	**7**

Third round
1	(Spain) **J C Ferrero**	**6**	6^{5}	**6**
(France) J Boutter	4	**7^{7}**	3
9	(Argentina) G Gaudio	2	2
WC/6	(Ecuador) **N Lapentti**	**6**	**6**

Quarterfinals
1	(Spain) J C Ferrero	6^{6}	2
WC/6	(Ecuador) **N Lapentti**	**7^{8}**	**6**

==== Section 2 ====
First round
(Brazil) **F Meligeni**	**6**	2	**6**
(Germany) C Vinck	4	**6**	4
(Australia) A Ilie	6^{7}	6^{8}
(Spain) **G Blanco**	**7^{9}**	**7^{10}**
(Spain) **S Bruguera**	**6**	3
(Argentina) J Acasuso	1	2^{r}
(Argentina) A Calleri	**7**	1^{r}
Q	(Romania) **G Trifu**	5	5

Second round
4	(Argentina) **F Squillari**	4	**6**	**6**
(Brazil) F Meligeni	**6**	3	3
(Spain) **G Blanco**	6^{5}	**6**	**6**
15	(Spain) F Vicente	**7^{7}**	2	1
11	(Romania) **A Pavel**	**6**	3	**7^{7}**
(Spain) S Bruguera	2	**6**	6^{3}
Q	(Romania) G Trifu	2	3
8	(Spain) **A Martín**	**6**	**6**

Third round
4	(Argentina) F Squillari	**6**	6^{3}	0
(Spain) **G Blanco**	3	**7^{7}**	**6**
11	(Romania) **A Pavel**	**6**	**6**
8	(Spain) A Martín	1	0

Quarterfinals
(Spain) **G Blanco**	5	**6**	5
11	(Romania) A Pavel	**7**	4	1^{r}

=== Bottom half ===
==== Section 3 ====
First round
(Spain) **F Mantilla**	**6**	3	**6**
WC	(Austria) T Schiessling	3	**6**	2
(Morocco) Y El Aynaoui	**7**	4	1
Q	(Czech Republic) **J Vacek**	5	**6**	**6**
(Czech Republic) C Doseděl	2	3
Q	(Germany) **M-K Goellner**	**6**	**6**
(Netherlands) J Siemerink	5	0
(Austria) **S Koubek**	**7**	**6**

Second round
5	(Argentina) **G Coria**	**6**	3	**7^{9}**
(Spain) F Mantilla	1	**6**	6^{7}
Q	(Czech Republic) J Vacek	2	3
10	(Spain) **Á Calatrava**	**6**	**6**
13	(Germany) **R Schüttler**	**6**	**7**
Q	(Germany) M-K Goellner	1	5
(Austria) **S Koubek**	4	**6**	**6**
3	(Spain) À Corretja	**6**	1	4

Third round
5	(Argentina) **G Coria**	**6**	**6**
10	(Spain) Á Calatrava	1	1
13	(Germany) R Schüttler	**6**	5	5
(Austria) **S Koubek**	2	**7**	**7**

Quarterfinals
5	(Argentina) **G Coria**	**6**	**6**
(Austria) S Koubek	4	0

==== Section 4 ====
First round
(Morocco) K Alami	4	2
(Austria) **M Hipfl**	**6**	**6**
(Spain) **A Costa**	**7^{8}**	**6**
(Germany) D Elsner	6^{6}	3
(Spain) G Puentes	2	4
(Chile) **N Massú**	**6**	**6**
WC	(Austria) **O Marach**	2	**7^{7}**	**6**
(Germany) J Knippschild	**6**	6^{4}	2

Second round
7	(Argentina) G Cañas	3	2
(Austria) **M Hipfl**	**6**	**6**
(Spain) **A Costa**	3
12	(Australia) W Arthurs	1^{r}
LL	(United States) **H Armando**	**6**	**7^{7}**
(Chile) N Massú	1	6^{5}
WC	(Austria) O Marach	6^{1}	**7**	4
2	(Russia) **Y Kafelnikov**	**7^{7}**	5	**6**

Third round
(Austria) M Hipfl	5	2
(Spain) **A Costa**	**7**	**6**
LL	(United States) **H Armando**	**6**	**6**
2	(Russia) Y Kafelnikov	1	1

Quarterfinals
(Spain) **A Costa**	**6**	**6**
LL	(United States) H Armando	4	4
