= 1998 International Raiffeisen Grand Prix – Doubles =

Doubles
- 1998 International Raiffeisen Grand Prix

Final
- Champions: (United States) Jim Grabb (Australia) David Macpherson
- Runners-up: (South Africa) David Adams (Zimbabwe) Wayne Black
- Score: 6–4, 6–4

Events
Singles	men	women
Doubles	men	women
← 1997 ·	International Raiffeisen Grand Prix	· 1999 →

The 1998 International Raiffeisen Grand Prix was a men's tennis tournament played on Clay in St. Pölten, Austria that was part of the International Series of the 1998 ATP Tour. It was the eighteenth edition of the tournament and was held from 18 to 24 May 1998.

== Seeds ==
Champion seeds are indicated in bold text while text in italics indicates the round in which those seeds were eliminated.

1. (United States) **Jim Grabb** / (Australia) **David Macpherson (champions)**
2. (United States) Francisco Montana / (Spain) Javier Sánchez (first round)
3. (South Africa) David Adams / (Zimbabwe) Wayne Black (final)
4. (United Kingdom) Neil Broad / (South Africa) Piet Norval (semifinals)

== Draw ==
=== Key ===
- Q = Qualifier
- WC = Wild card
- LL = Lucky loser
- Alt = Alternate
- SE = Special exempt
- PR = Protected ranking
- ITF = ITF entry
- JE = Junior exempt
- w/o = Walkover
- r = Retired
- d = Defaulted
- SR = Special ranking

=== Finals ===
First round
1	(United States) **J Grabb** **(Australia) D Macpherson**	**6**	**6**
(Australia) P Kilderry (Sweden) P Nyborg	4	4
(Argentina) **L Arnold** **(Argentina) D Orsanic**	5	**6**	**6**
(Zimbabwe) B Black (United States) P Galbraith	**7**	2	2
4	(United Kingdom) **N Broad** **(South Africa) P Norval**	**6**	**7**
(Austria) M Hipfl (United States) L Jensen	4	6
(United States) **K Kinnear** **(North Macedonia) A Kitinov**	**6**	**6**
(Austria) T Buchmayer (Austria) T Strengberger	3	4
(Italy) **A Gaudenzi** **(Austria) T Muster**	**6**	**6**
(United States) M Keil (Australia) P Rafter	4	2
3	(South Africa) **D Adams** **(Zimbabwe) W Black**	**6**	**6**
(South Africa) G Stafford (South Africa) K Ullyett	3	2
(Czech Republic) **L Pimek** **(Mexico) D Roditi**	**6**	**7**
(Russia) A Olhovskiy (Czech Republic) P Vízner	4	6
(South Africa) **J-L de Jager** **(South Africa) R Koenig**	**6**	**7**
2	(United States) F Montana (Spain) J Sánchez	4	6

Quarterfinals
1	(United States) **J Grabb** **(Australia) D Macpherson**	**6**	**6**
(Argentina) L Arnold (Argentina) D Orsanic	4	4
4	(United Kingdom) **N Broad** **(South Africa) P Norval**	**6**	**6**
(United States) K Kinnear (North Macedonia) A Kitinov	3	2
(Italy) A Gaudenzi (Austria) T Muster	2	3
3	(South Africa) **D Adams** **(Zimbabwe) W Black**	**6**	**6**
(Czech Republic) L Pimek (Mexico) D Roditi	3	1
(South Africa) **J-L de Jager** **(South Africa) R Koenig**	**6**	**6**

Semifinals
1	(United States) **J Grabb** **(Australia) D Macpherson**	**6**	**6**
4	(United Kingdom) N Broad (South Africa) P Norval	4	2
3	(South Africa) **D Adams** **(Zimbabwe) W Black**	**6**	0
(South Africa) J-L de Jager (South Africa) R Koenig	1	1^{r}

Final
1	(United States) **J Grabb** **(Australia) D Macpherson**	**6**	**6**
3	(South Africa) D Adams (Zimbabwe) W Black	4	4
