= 1999 International Raiffeisen Grand Prix – Doubles =

Doubles
- 1999 International Raiffeisen Grand Prix

Final
- Champions: (Australia) Andrew Florent (Russia) Andrei Olhovskiy
- Runners-up: (South Africa) Brent Haygarth (South Africa) Robbie Koenig
- Score: 5–7, 6–4, 7–5

Events
Singles	men	women
Doubles	men	women
← 1998 ·	International Raiffeisen Grand Prix	· 2000 →

The 1999 International Raiffeisen Grand Prix was a men's tennis tournament played on Clay in St. Pölten, Austria that was part of the World Series of the 1999 ATP Tour. It was the nineteenth edition of the tournament and was held from 17–23 May 1999.

== Seeds ==
Champion seeds are indicated in bold text while text in italics indicates the round in which those seeds were eliminated.

1. (Czech Republic) Jiří Novák / (Czech Republic) David Rikl (first round)
2. (South Africa) David Adams / (South Africa) John-Laffnie de Jager (semifinals)
3. (South Africa) Chris Haggard / (South Africa) Piet Norval (semifinals)
4. (Australia) **Andrew Florent** / (Russia) **Andrei Olhovskiy (champions)**

== Draw ==
=== Key ===
- Q = Qualifier
- WC = Wild card
- LL = Lucky loser
- Alt = Alternate
- ITF = ITF entry
- PR = Protected ranking
- SR = Special ranking
- SE = Special exempt
- JE = Junior exempt
- JR = Junior Accelerator Programme entrant
- CO = College Accelerator Programme entrant
- NG = Next Gen Accelerator Program entrant
- w/o = Walkover
- r = Retired
- d = Defaulted

=== Finals ===
First round
(Hungary) **G Köves** **(Brazil) A Sá**	**6**	2	**6**
1	(Czech Republic) J Novák (Czech Republic) D Rikl	3	**6**	3
(North Macedonia) **A Kitinov** **(United States) F Montana**	**6**	**6**
(South Africa) L Bale (Argentina) D Orsanic	3	3
4	(Australia) **A Florent** **(Russia) A Olhovskiy**	**6**	**6**
(United States) M Keil (Sweden) P Nyborg	3	2
(Spain) **J Alonso** **(Austria) M Hipfl**	**6**	**6**
(Austria) L Pampoulov (Austria) Markus Polessnig	1	1
(South Africa) **B Haygarth** **(South Africa) R Koenig**	**6**	3	**6**
(Austria) T Buchmayer (Austria) T Strengberger	2	**6**	1
3	(South Africa) **C Haggard** **(South Africa) P Norval**	**7**	**6**
(Italy) M Bertolini (Italy) C Brandi	6	3
(Czech Republic) **T Krupa** **(Czech Republic) P Pála**	**7**	**7**
(Spain) T Carbonell (Spain) A Martín	5	6
2	(South Africa) **D Adams** **(South Africa) J-L de Jager**	6	**7**	**7**
(Australia) P Tramacchi (Czech Republic) P Vízner	**7**	5	6

Quarterfinals
(Hungary) G Köves (Brazil) A Sá	1	2
(North Macedonia) **A Kitinov** **(United States) F Montana**	**6**	**6**
4	(Australia) **A Florent** **(Russia) A Olhovskiy**	**6**	**7**
(Spain) J Alonso (Austria) M Hipfl	3	6
(South Africa) **B Haygarth** **(South Africa) R Koenig**	**7**	**6**
3	(South Africa) C Haggard (South Africa) P Norval	5	2
(Czech Republic) **T Krupa** **(Czech Republic) P Pála**	6	**7**	**7**
2	(South Africa) D Adams (South Africa) J-L de Jager	**7**	6	6

Semifinals
(North Macedonia) A Kitinov (United States) F Montana	**7**	4	3
4	(Australia) **A Florent** **(Russia) A Olhovskiy**	6	**6**	**6**
(South Africa) **B Haygarth** **(South Africa) R Koenig**	4	**7**	**6**
(Czech Republic) T Krupa (Czech Republic) P Pála	**6**	5	3

Final
4	(Australia) **A Florent** **(Russia) A Olhovskiy**	5	**6**	**7**
(South Africa) B Haygarth (South Africa) R Koenig	**7**	4	5
