= 1998 ATP Tour World Championships – Doubles =

Doubles
- 1998 ATP Tour World Championships

Final
- Champions: (Netherlands) Jacco Eltingh (Netherlands) Paul Haarhuis
- Runners-up: (The Bahamas) Mark Knowles (Canada) Daniel Nestor
- Score: 6–4, 6–2, 7–5

Details
- Draw: 8

Events
Singles	Doubles
← 1997 ·	ATP Tour World Championships	· 1999 →

Jacco Eltingh and Paul Haarhuis defeated Mark Knowles and Daniel Nestor in the final, 6–4, 6–2, 7–5 to win the doubles tennis title at the 1998 ATP Tour World Championships.

Rick Leach and Jonathan Stark were the defending champions, but did not compete together in 1998. Stark failed to qualify with another partner; Leach partnered Ellis Ferreira, but was eliminated in the round-robin stage.

== Seeds ==
1. (Netherlands) Jacco Eltingh / (Netherlands) Paul Haarhuis (champions)
2. (India) Mahesh Bhupathi / (India) Leander Paes (round robin, withdrew due to a left ankle injury of Paes)
3. (Australia) Todd Woodbridge / (Australia) Mark Woodforde (round robin)
4. (The Bahamas) Mark Knowles / (Canada) Daniel Nestor (final)
5. (South Africa) Ellis Ferreira / (United States) Rick Leach (round robin)
6. (Australia) Sandon Stolle / (Czech Republic) Cyril Suk (round robin)
7. (France) Olivier Delaître / (France) Fabrice Santoro (semifinals)
8. (United States) Donald Johnson / (United States) Francisco Montana (semifinals)
9. (Australia) Joshua Eagle / (Australia) Andrew Florent (round robin)

== Draw ==
Key

- Q = Qualifier
- WC = Wild card
- LL = Lucky loser
- Alt = Alternate
- ITF = ITF entry
- PR = Protected ranking
- SR = Special ranking
- SE = Special exempt
- JE = Junior exempt
- JR = Junior Accelerator Programme entrant
- CO = College Accelerator Programme entrant
- NG = Next Gen Accelerator Program entrant
- w/o = Walkover
- r = Retired
- d = Defaulted

=== Finals ===
Semifinals
1	(Netherlands) Jacco Eltingh (Netherlands) Paul Haarhuis	7	6
8	(United States) Donald Johnson (United States) Francisco Montana	6^{1}	4
4	(The Bahamas) Mark Knowles (Canada) Daniel Nestor	4	6	7
7	(France) Olivier Delaître (France) Fabrice Santoro	6	4	5

Final
1	(Netherlands) Jacco Eltingh (Netherlands) Paul Haarhuis	6	6	7
4	(The Bahamas) Mark Knowles (Canada) Daniel Nestor	4	2	5

=== Green group ===
		(Netherlands) Eltingh (Netherlands) Haarhuis	(Australia) Woodbridge (Australia) Woodforde	(South Africa) Ferreira (United States) Leach	(France) Delaître (France) Santoro	RR; W–L	Set; W–L	Game; W–L	Standings
1	(Netherlands) Jacco Eltingh (Netherlands) Paul Haarhuis		7–6^{(7–3)}, 6–4	6–4, 6–4	4–6, 7–5, 7–5	3–0	6–1	43–34	1
3	(Australia) Todd Woodbridge (Australia) Mark Woodforde	6–7^{(3–7)}, 4–6		6–7^{(3–7)}, 3–6	7–6^{(7–1)}, 3–6, 4–6	0–3	1–6	33–44	4
5	(South Africa) Ellis Ferreira (United States) Rick Leach	4–6, 4–6	7–6^{(7–3)}, 6–3		6–7^{(1–7)}, 6–4, 6–7^{(3–7)}	1–2	3–4	39–39	3
7	(France) Olivier Delaître (France) Fabrice Santoro	6–4, 5–7, 5–7	6–7^{(1–7)}, 6–3, 6–4	7–6^{(7–1)}, 4–6, 7–6^{(7–3)}		2–1	5–4	52–50	2

Standings are determined by: 1. number of wins; 2. number of matches; 3. in two-players-ties, head-to-head records; 4. in three-players-ties, percentage of sets won, or of games won; 5. steering-committee decision.

=== Gold group ===
		(India) Bhupathi (India) Paes (Australia) Eagle (Australia) Florent	(The Bahamas) Knowles (Canada) Nestor	(Australia) Stolle (Czech Republic) Suk	(United States) Johnson (United States) Montana	RR; W–L	Set; W–L	Game; W–L	Standings
2; 9	(India) Mahesh Bhupathi (India) Leander Paes (Australia) Joshua Eagle (Australia) Andrew Florent		7–6^{(7–5)}, 6–0 (w/ Eagle / Florent)	6–4, 3–6, 4–6 (w/ Bhupathi / Paes)	6–3, 4–6, 6–7^{(4–7)} (w/ Bhupathi / Paes)	0–2; 1–0	2–4; 2–0	29–32; 13–6	5; 4
4	(The Bahamas) Mark Knowles (Canada) Daniel Nestor	6–7^{(5–7)}, 0–6 (w/ Eagle / Florent)		2–6, 6–4, 6–2	6–3, 6–2	2–1	4–3	32–30	1
6	(Australia) Sandon Stolle (Czech Republic) Cyril Suk	4–6, 6–3, 6–4 (w/ Bhupathi / Paes)	6–2, 4–6, 2–6		7–6^{(8–6)}, 6–7^{(5–7)}, 6–7^{(4–7)}	1–2	4–5	47–47	3
8	(United States) Donald Johnson (United States) Francisco Montana	3–6, 6–4, 7–6^{(7–4)} (w/ Bhupathi / Paes)	3–6, 2–6	6–7^{(6–8)}, 7–6^{(7–5)}, 7–6^{(7–4)}		2–1	4–4	41–47	2

Standings are determined by: 1. number of wins; 2. number of matches; 3. in two-players-ties, head-to-head records; 4. in three-players-ties, percentage of sets won, or of games won; 5. steering-committee decision.
