= Olivier Delaître =

French tennis player

- Country (sports): France
- Residence: Suresnes, France
- Born: 1 June 1967 (age 58); Metz, France
- Height: 1.68 m (5 ft 6 in)
- Turned pro: 1986
- Retired: 2000
- Plays: Right-handed (one-handed backhand)
- Prize money: $2,788,904

Singles
- Career record: 130–179
- Career titles: 0
- Highest ranking: No. 33 (20 February 1995)

Grand Slam singles results
- Australian Open: 4R (1995)
- French Open: 4R (1994)
- Wimbledon: 3R (1995)
- US Open: 2R (1989)

Doubles
- Career record: 225–179
- Career titles: 15
- Highest ranking: No. 3 (12 July 1999)

Grand Slam doubles results
- Australian Open: 3R (1998, 1999)
- French Open: 3R (1997)
- Wimbledon: SF (1999)
- US Open: 3R (1996, 1998)

Team competitions
- Davis Cup: W (1991)

Olivier Delaître (French: [ɔlivje dəlɛːtʁ]; born 1 June 1967) is a former professional tennis player from France. He was semifinalist at the Wimbledon Championships in 1999 in doubles (partnering Fabrice Santoro), and reached the fourth round of the 1994 French Open and 1995 Australian Open in singles.

== Career ==
Delaitre turned professional in 1986.

In singles, he reached four ATP-tour finals, and achieved a career-high ranking of 33 in February 1995.

In doubles, he won 15 titles during his career and reached a career-high ranking of 3 in July 1999. In 1998, he won four doubles titles with Fabrice Santoro and together they qualified for the end-of-year ATP Finals, where they reached the semifinals. In 1999, Delaitre and Santoro lost in the semifinals of Wimbledon 7-5 in the final set to eventual champions Mahesh Bhupati and Leander Paes. Delaitre's biggest title was the Monte Carlo Masters in 1999, where - unseeded - he and Tim Henman won the tournament without dropping a set.

Delaitre was the first person to defeat future World No. 1 Roger Federer at a Grand Slam, in the first qualifying round of the 1999 Australian Open.

== Career finals ==
=== Singles: 4 (0–4) ===
Legend Grand Slam Tournaments (0–0) ATP Tour World Championships (0–0) ATP Super 9 (0–0) ATP Championship Series (0–1) ATP World Series (0–3)	Finals by surface Hard (0–2) Clay (0–1) Grass (0–0) Carpet (0–1)

Result	W/L	Date	Tournament	Surface	Opponent	Score
Loss	1.	Sep 1991	Bordeaux, France	Clay	(France) Guy Forget	1–6, 3–6
Loss	2.	Oct 1991	Lyon, France	Carpet (i)	(United States) Pete Sampras	1–6, 1–6
Loss	3.	Jan 1993	Kuala Lumpur, Malaysia	Hard	(United States) Richey Reneberg	3–6, 1–6
Loss	4.	Aug 1994	Indianapolis, U.S.	Hard	(South Africa) Wayne Ferreira	2–6, 1–6

=== Doubles: 26 (15–11) ===
Legend Grand Slam Tournaments (0–0) ATP Tour World Championships (0–0) ATP Super 9 (1–1) ATP Championship Series (3–2) ATP World Series (11–8)	Finals by surface Hard (10–9) Clay (2–1) Grass (1–0) Carpet (2–1)

Result	W/L	Date	Tournament	Surface	Partner	Opponents	Score
Win	1.	Feb 1991	Guarujá, Brazil	Hard	(France) Rodolphe Gilbert	(United States) Shelby Cannon (United States) Greg Van Emburgh	6–2, 6–4
Win	2.	Feb 1993	Marseille, France	Carpet (i)	(France) Arnaud Boetsch	(United States) Ivan Lendl (South Africa) Christo van Rensburg	6–3, 7–6
Loss	1.	Aug 1993	Long Island, U.S.	Hard	(France) Arnaud Boetsch	(Germany) Marc-Kevin Goellner (Germany) David Prinosil	7–6, 5–7, 2–6
Win	3.	Jan 1994	Doha, Qatar	Hard	(France) Stéphane Simian	(United States) Shelby Cannon (South Africa) Byron Talbot	6–3, 6–3
Win	4.	Jun 1994	Halle, Germany	Grass	(France) Guy Forget	(France) Henri Leconte (South Africa) Gary Muller	6–4, 6–7, 6–4
Win	5.	Aug 1994	Long Island, U.S.	Hard	(France) Guy Forget	(Australia) Andrew Florent (United Kingdom) Mark Petchey	6–4, 7–6
Win	6.	Sep 1994	Bordeaux, France	Hard	(France) Guy Forget	(Italy) Diego Nargiso (France) Guillaume Raoux	6–2, 2–6, 7–5
Win	7.	Jul 1995	Washington, D.C., U.S.	Hard	(United States) Jeff Tarango	(Czech Republic) Petr Korda (Czech Republic) Cyril Suk	1–6, 6–3, 6–2
Loss	2.	Apr 1996	Munich, Germany	Clay	(Italy) Diego Nargiso	(South Africa) Lan Bale (Netherlands) Stephen Noteboom	6–4, 6–7, 4–6
Loss	3.	Oct 1996	Toulouse, France	Hard (i)	(France) Guillaume Raoux	(Netherlands) Jacco Eltingh (Netherlands) Paul Haarhuis	3–6, 5–7
Loss	4.	Feb 1997	Marseille, France	Hard (i)	(France) Fabrice Santoro	(Sweden) Thomas Enqvist (Sweden) Magnus Larsson	3–6, 4–6
Win	8.	Feb 1997	Antwerp, Belgium	Hard (i)	(South Africa) David Adams	(Australia) Sandon Stolle (Czech Republic) Cyril Suk	3–6, 6–2, 6–1
Loss	5.	Oct 1997	Lyon, France	Carpet (i)	(France) Fabrice Santoro	(South Africa) Ellis Ferreira (United States) Patrick Galbraith	6–3, 2–6, 4–6
Loss	6.	Jan 1998	Doha, Qatar	Hard	(France) Fabrice Santoro	(India) Mahesh Bhupathi (India) Leander Paes	4–6, 6–3, 4–6
Loss	7.	Apr 1998	Chennai, India	Hard	(Belarus) Max Mirnyi	(India) Mahesh Bhupathi (India) Leander Paes	7–6, 3–6, 2–6
Loss	8.	Apr 1998	Tokyo, Japan	Hard	(Italy) Stefano Pescosolido	(Canada) Sébastien Lareau (Canada) Daniel Nestor	3–6, 4–6
Win	9.	Jul 1998	Stuttgart, Germany	Clay	(France) Fabrice Santoro	(Australia) Joshua Eagle (United States) Jim Grabb	6–1, 3–6, 6–3
Loss	9.	Aug 1998	Cincinnati, U.S.	Hard	(France) Fabrice Santoro	(The Bahamas) Mark Knowles (Canada) Daniel Nestor	1–6, 1–2, ret.
Win	10.	Sep 1998	Toulouse, France	Hard (i)	(France) Fabrice Santoro	(Netherlands) Paul Haarhuis (Netherlands) Jan Siemerink	6–2, 6–4
Win	11.	Oct 1998	Basel, Switzerland	Hard (i)	(France) Fabrice Santoro	(South Africa) Piet Norval (Zimbabwe) Kevin Ullyett	6–3, 7–6
Win	12.	Oct 1998	Lyon, France	Carpet (i)	(France) Fabrice Santoro	(Spain) Tomás Carbonell (Spain) Francisco Roig	6–2, 6–2
Win	13.	Apr 1999	Monte Carlo, Monaco	Clay	(United Kingdom) Tim Henman	(Czech Republic) Jiří Novák (Czech Republic) David Rikl	6–2, 6–3
Loss	10.	Aug 1999	Indianapolis, U.S.	Hard	(India) Leander Paes	(Netherlands) Paul Haarhuis (United States) Jared Palmer	3–6, 4–6
Win	14.	Aug 1999	Long Island, U.S.	Hard	(France) Fabrice Santoro	(United States) Jan-Michael Gambill (United States) Scott Humphries	7–5, 6–4
Win	15.	Sep 1999	Toulouse, France	Hard (i)	(United States) Jeff Tarango	(South Africa) David Adams (South Africa) John-Laffnie de Jager	3–6, 7–6, 6–4
Loss	11.	Jan 2000	Auckland, New Zealand	Hard	(United States) Jeff Tarango	(South Africa) Ellis Ferreira (United States) Rick Leach	5–7, 4–6

== Doubles performance timeline ==
Key
W	F	SF	QF	#R	RR	Q#	DNQ	A	NH

(W) winner; (F) finalist; (SF) semifinalist; (QF) quarterfinalist; (#R) rounds 4, 3, 2, 1; (RR) round-robin stage; (Q#) qualification round; (DNQ) did not qualify; (A) absent; (NH) not held; (SR) strike rate (events won / competed); (W–L) win–loss record.

Tournament	1986	1987	1988	1989	1990	1991	1992	1993	1994	1995	1996	1997	1998	1999	2000	Career SR	Career win–loss
Grand Slam tournaments
Australian Open	NH	A	A	1R	2R	A	A	A	1R	1R	2R	A	3R	3R	1R	0 / 8	6–8
French Open	A	1R	2R	1R	2R	1R	2R	1R	1R	1R	2R	3R	1R	2R	1R	0 / 14	7–14
Wimbledon	A	A	A	A	A	A	A	3R	2R	3R	A	1R	A	SF	3R	0 / 6	11–6
U.S. Open	A	A	A	1R	2R	A	A	1R	2R	1R	3R	1R	3R	2R	A	0 / 9	7–8
Grand Slam SR	0 / 0	0 / 1	0 / 1	0 / 3	0 / 3	0 / 1	0 / 1	0 / 3	0 / 4	0 / 4	0 / 3	0 / 3	0 / 3	0 / 4	0 / 3	0 / 37	N/A
Annual win–loss	0–0	0–1	1–1	0–3	3–3	0–1	1–1	2–3	2–4	2–4	4–3	2–3	4–3	8–3	2–3	N/A	31–36
Masters Series
Indian Wells	These Were Not ATP Masters Series Before 1990				A	A	2R	A	A	2R	A	A	A	A	1R	0 / 3	2–3
Miami	These Were Not ATP Masters Series Before 1990				A	A	A	1R	2R	1R	A	A	A	2R	2R	0 / 5	1–5
Monte Carlo	These Were Not ATP Masters Series Before 1990				A	A	A	2R	QF	1R	1R	2R	A	W	2R	1 / 7	10–6
Rome	These Were Not ATP Masters Series Before 1990				A	A	A	A	A	A	A	2R	A	SF	1R	0 / 3	4–3
Hamburg	These Were Not ATP Masters Series Before 1990				A	A	A	A	A	A	A	A	A	SF	1R	0 / 2	2–2
Canada	These Were Not ATP Masters Series Before 1990				A	A	A	A	QF	2R	A	2R	2R	QF	A	0 / 5	6–5
Cincinnati	These Were Not ATP Masters Series Before 1990				A	A	A	A	1R	1R	A	SF	F	2R	A	0 / 5	7–5
Stuttgart (Stockholm)	These Were Not ATP Masters Series Before 1990				A	A	A	A	A	A	A	A	SF	2R	A	0 / 2	3–2
Paris	These Were Not ATP Masters Series Before 1990				A	A	QF	1R	2R	A	1R	1R	2R	2R	A	0 / 7	3–7
Masters Series SR	N/A				0 / 0	0 / 0	0 / 2	0 / 3	0 / 5	0 / 5	0 / 2	0 / 5	0 / 4	1 / 8	0 / 5	1 / 39	N/A
Annual win–loss	N/A				0–0	0–0	3–2	1–3	6–5	2–5	0–2	6–5	8–4	11–7	1–5	N/A	38–38
Year-end ranking	436	514	227	127	166	121	154	90	20	52	91	37	12	16	107	N/A	
