= 1999 International Raiffeisen Grand Prix – Singles =

Singles
- 1999 International Raiffeisen Grand Prix

Final
- Champion: (Chile) Marcelo Ríos
- Runner-up: (Argentina) Mariano Zabaleta
- Score: 4–4, retired

Events
Singles	men	women
Doubles	men	women
← 1998 ·	International Raiffeisen Grand Prix	· 2000 →

The 1999 International Raiffeisen Grand Prix was a men's tennis tournament played on Clay in St. Pölten, Austria that was part of the World Series of the 1999 ATP Tour. It was the nineteenth edition of the tournament and was held from 17–23 May 1999.

== Seeds ==
Champion seeds are indicated in bold text while text in italics indicates the round in which those seeds were eliminated.

1. (Russia) Yevgeny Kafelnikov (semifinals)
2. (Chile) **Marcelo Ríos (champion)**
3. (Croatia) Goran Ivanišević (second round)
4. (Spain) Francisco Clavet (quarterfinals)
5. (Argentina) Mariano Zabaleta (final, retired)
6. (Morocco) Younes El Aynaoui (semifinals)
7. (Austria) Thomas Muster (first round)
8. (Argentina) Mariano Puerta (first round)

== Draw ==
=== Key ===
- Q = Qualifier
- WC = Wild card
- LL = Lucky loser
- Alt = Alternate
- ITF = ITF entry
- PR = Protected ranking
- SR = Special ranking
- SE = Special exempt
- JE = Junior exempt
- JR = Junior Accelerator Programme entrant
- CO = College Accelerator Programme entrant
- NG = Next Gen Accelerator Program entrant
- w/o = Walkover
- r = Retired
- d = Defaulted

=== Finals ===
Semifinals
1	(Russia) Yevgeny Kafelnikov	5	3
5	**(Argentina) Mariano Zabaleta**	**7**	**6**
6	(Morocco) Younes El Aynaoui	1	3
2	**(Chile) Marcelo Ríos**	**6**	**6**

Final
2	**(Chile) Marcelo Ríos**	4
5	(Argentina) Mariano Zabaleta	4^{r}

=== Top half ===
First round
1	**(Russia) Y Kafelnikov**	**7**	**6**
(Venezuela) J Szymanski	6^{4}	2
**(Argentina) F Squillari**	**6**	**6**
(Canada) D Nestor	3	3
**(Austria) M Hipfl**	**6**	**6**
(Costa Rica) JA Marín	1	1
**(Norway) C Ruud**	3	**6**	**7**
8	(Argentina) M Puerta	**6**	1	6^{2}
4	**(Spain) F Clavet**	4	**7**	**6**
(Netherlands) S Schalken	**6**	6^{4}	2
**(Australia) R Fromberg**	**6**	**6**
(Spain) J Alonso	3	1
**(Slovakia) J Krošlák**	**7**	**7**
(Czech Republic) J Novák	6^{4}	5
5	**(Argentina) M Zabaleta**	**6**	**7**
(United States) J Gimelstob	4	5

Second round
1	**(Russia) Y Kafelnikov**	**6**	**6**
(Argentina) F Squillari	4	1
**(Austria) Markus Hipfl**	**6**	**6**
(Norway) C Ruud	4	2
4	**(Spain) F Clavet**	**6**	**6**
(Australia) R Fromberg	4	3
(Slovakia) J Krošlák	5	3
5	**(Argentina) M Zabaleta**	**7**	**6**

Quarterfinals
1	**(Russia) Y Kafelnikov**	**6**	**6**
(Austria) Markus Hipfl	2	2
4	(Spain) F Clavet	2	**6**	3
5	**(Argentina) M Zabaleta**	**6**	4	**6**

Semifinals
1	(Russia) Y Kafelnikov	5	3
5	**(Argentina) M Zabaleta**	**7**	**6**

=== Bottom half ===
First round
6	**(Morocco) Y El Aynaoui**	**7**	**6**
(France) C Auffray	5	2
**(Germany) R Schüttler**	**7**	**6**
(Sweden) M Norman	5	4
**(Argentina) G Cañas**	**6**	**6**
(Spain) T Carbonell	3	3
3	**(Croatia) G Ivanišević**	**6**	5	**6**
(Australia) A Ilie	2	**7**	3
**(Austria) S Koubek**	**6**	**6**
7	(Austria) T Muster	3	4
**(Czech Republic) R Štěpánek**	2	**6**	**6**
(Italy) A Gaudenzi	**6**	3	1
**(Spain) A Berasategui**	**7**	**6**
(Spain) A Martín	6^{5}	3
2	**(Chile) M Ríos**	**7**	5	**6**
(Italy) D Sanguinetti	6^{4}	**7**	3

Second round
6	**(Morocco) Y El Aynaoui**	**6**	**6**
(Germany) R Schüttler	2	1
**(Argentina) G Cañas**	**6**	**6**
3	(Croatia) G Ivanišević	2	2
**(Austria) S Koubek**	**6**	3	**7**
(Czech Republic) R Štěpánek	3	**6**	6^{4}
(Spain) A Berasategui	6^{4}	2
2	**(Chile) M Ríos**	**7**	**6**

Quarterfinals
6	**(Morocco) Y El Aynaoui**	**6**	**7**
(Argentina) G Cañas	3	5
(Austria) S Koubek	4	0
2	**(Chile) M Ríos**	**6**	**6**

Semifinals
6	(Morocco) Y El Aynaoui	1	3
2	**(Chile) M Ríos**	**6**	**6**
