= Ignacio Truyol =

Spanish tennis player (born 1973)

- Full name: Ignacio Truyol-Turrión
- Country (sports): Spain
- Born: August 1973; Madrid, Spain
- Turned pro: 1993
- Prize money: $109,540

Singles
- Career record: 4–6
- Career titles: 0
- Highest ranking: No. 104 (19 August 1996)

Doubles
- Highest ranking: No. 387 (3 October 1994)

Ignacio Truyol-Turrión (born August 1973) is a former professional tennis player from Spain. He was the first tennis player ever to be suspended for testing positive to a banned drug.

== Biography ==
Born in Madrid, Truyol had a breakthrough season in 1996 when he came close to breaking into the top 100. Beginning the year ranked 238, by August he had made it to 104 in the world. In his first main draw appearance in an ATP Tour tournament, at the Trofeo Conde de Godó in Barcelona, Truyol reached the third round, with wins over Sándor Noszály and world number 25 Paul Haarhuis. A qualifier, he also managed to take eventual finalist Marcelo Ríos to three sets before being eliminated. Soon after he reached the second round of the Oporto Open and then won his first Challenger title, in Istanbul. He made his third ATP Tour appearance that season in Indianapolis and had an opening round win over the previous year's runner-up, Bernd Karbacher. In the second round he was beaten in three sets by Àlex Corretja. He made further main draw appearances in Bournemouth, Palermo and Tel Aviv to close out the year.

It was announced in 1997 that Truyol had tested positive for an anabolic steroid and stimulant during a Challenger tournament the previous year in Ostend, Belgium. Truyol claimed that the drugs, nandrolone and pemoline, were prescribed by a Spanish physician for a chronic back injury. He was banned from all competition for one-year. The first player in history to be given a drugs ban, Truyol told a Spanish newspaper that he felt like a "guinea pig" and believed that if it had been Peter Sampras or Andre Agassi who had tested positive they would not have been suspended.

Truyol didn't return to tennis until 1999 and made the semi-finals of Challenger events in Segovia and Budapest in his first year back. Before retiring in 2001 he tried unsuccessfully to qualify for the French Open, Wimbledon and US Open.

== Challenger titles ==
=== Singles: (1) ===
No.	Year	Tournament	Surface	Opponent	Score
1.	1996	Istanbul, Turkey	Hard	(France) Jean-Philippe Fleurian	6–2, 6–4
