= Emilio Benfele Álvarez =

Spanish tennis player (born 1972)

- Country (sports): Spain
- Residence: Munich, Germany
- Born: 15 November 1972 (age 52); Figueres, Spain
- Height: 1.82 m (5 ft 11 1/2 in)
- Turned pro: 1989
- Retired: 2005
- Plays: Right-handed (one-handed backhand)
- Prize money: $898,962

Singles
- Career record: 45–67
- Career titles: 0
- Highest ranking: No. 81 (5 May 1997)

Grand Slam singles results
- Australian Open: 1R (1998)
- French Open: 2R (1995, 1998)
- Wimbledon: 2R (1997)
- US Open: 1R (1997)

Doubles
- Career record: 20–46
- Career titles: 0
- Highest ranking: No. 91 (5 July 2004)

Grand Slam doubles results
- Australian Open: 1R (2002)
- French Open: 1R (2000)
- Wimbledon: Q1 (1995)

Emilio Benfele Álvarez (born 15 November 1972) is a former professional tennis player from Spain who retired in 2005. His favourite surface was clay, and he achieved his only ATP final in 2000 in Kitzbühel. At the same tournament he reached the semifinals in 1996, he got into Kitzbühel draw after losing in the last round of qualifying and beat specialists at clay: Santoro, Clavet, Medvedev and top seed Muster before losing in three sets to Berasategui in the semifinals. He achieved his career-high singles ranking of world No. 81 in 1997 (and No. 91 in doubles in 2004).

== ATP career finals ==
=== Singles: 1 (1 runner-up) ===
Result	W/L	Date	Tournament	Surface	Opponent	Score
Loss	0–1	Jul 2000	Kitzbühel, Austria	Clay	(Spain) Àlex Corretja	3–6, 1–6, 0–3, ret.

=== Doubles: 2 (2 runner-ups) ===
Result	W/L	Date	Tournament	Surface	Partner	Opponents	Score
Loss	0–1	Sep 2001	Palermo, Italy	Clay	(Italy) Enzo Artoni	(Spain) Tomás Carbonell (Argentina) Daniel Orsanic	2–6, 6–2, 2–6
Loss	0–2	Sep 2002	Bucharest, Romania	Clay	(Argentina) Andrés Schneiter	(Germany) Jens Knippschild (Sweden) Peter Nyborg	3–6, 3–6

== Top 10 wins ==
#	Player	Rank	Event	Surface	Rd	Score	Benfele Rank
1996
1.	(Austria) Thomas Muster	2	Austrian Open, Kitzbühel, Austria	Clay	QF	6–1, 7–5	160
