= Joshua Eagle =

Australian tennis player

- Country (sports): Australia
- Residence: Noosa, Queensland
- Born: 10 May 1973 (age 53) Toowoomba, Queensland
- Height: 1.83 m (6 ft 0 in)
- Plays: Right-handed
- Prize money: $1,421,375

Singles
- Career record: 3–12
- Career titles: 0
- Highest ranking: No. 219 (28 February 1994)

Grand Slam singles results
- Australian Open: 1R (1994)
- French Open: 1R (1994)
- Wimbledon: Q1 (1994, 1995, 1996)
- US Open: Q1 (1994, 1995)

Doubles
- Career record: 262–229
- Career titles: 5
- Highest ranking: No. 11 (23 April 2001)

Grand Slam doubles results
- Australian Open: QF (2000, 2001)
- French Open: QF (1997)
- Wimbledon: 3R (2002, 2003)
- US Open: 3R (2001, 2003)

Grand Slam mixed doubles results
- Australian Open: F (2001)
- French Open: QF (1998)
- Wimbledon: SF (2000)
- US Open: QF (1996, 2000)

Joshua Eagle (born 10 May 1973) is a former professional male tennis player and current professional tennis coach from Australia.

In January 2013 he was appointed as the Australian Davis Cup coach, having previously won Tennis Australia's elite coaching excellence award in 2012 for helping Australian Marinko Matosevic break into the top 50 from outside 200. He was born in Toowoomba, Queensland and now lives in Noosa, Queensland. He stands at 1.83 m and weighs 90 kg, and is classified as a doubles specialist. Eagle has won five ATP doubles titles.

Eagle is married to former professional tennis player Barbara Schett. They have a son who was born in 2009.

== Junior Grand Slam finals ==
=== Doubles: 1 (title) ===
Result	Year	Tournament	Surface	Partner	Opponent	Score
Win	1991	Australian Open	Hard	(Australia) Grant Doyle	(Australia) James Holmes (Australia) Paul Kilderry	7–6, 6–4

== ATP Tour finals ==
=== Doubles: 24 (5 titles, 19 runner-ups) ===
Legend Grand Slam (0–0) ATP Masters Series (0–2) ATP Championship Series (2–2) ATP World Series (3–15)	Finals by surface Hard (3–7) Clay (2–9) Grass (0–2) Carpet (0–1)	Finals by setting Outdoor (4–18) Indoor (1–1)

Result	W–L	Date	Tournament	Tier	Surface	Partner	Opponents	Score
Loss	0–1	Apr 1995	Seoul Open, South Korea	World Series	Hard	(Australia) Andrew Florent	(Canada) Sébastien Lareau (United States) Jeff Tarango	3–6, 2–6
Loss	0–2	Jun 1996	Oporto Open, Portugal	World Series	Clay	(Australia) Andrew Florent	(Portugal) Emanuel Couto (Portugal) Bernardo Mota	6–4, 4–6, 4–6
Loss	0–3	Jul 1996	Swedish Open, Sweden	World Series	Clay	(Sweden) Peter Nyborg	(Sweden) David Ekerot (United States) Jeff Tarango	4–6, 6–3, 4–6
Win	1–3	Jan 1998	Adelaide, Australia	World Series	Hard	(Australia) Andrew Florent	(South Africa) Ellis Ferreira (United States) Rick Leach	6–4, 6–7, 6–3
Loss	1–4	May 1998	Munich, Germany	World Series	Clay	(Australia) Andrew Florent	(Australia) Todd Woodbridge (Australia) Mark Woodforde	0–6, 3–6
Loss	1–5	Jun 1998	's-Hertogenbosch, Netherlands	World Series	Grass	(Australia) Andrew Florent	(France) Guillaume Raoux (Netherlands) Jan Siemerink	6–7^{(5–7)}, 2–6
Loss	1–6	Jul 1998	Stuttgart, Germany	Championship Series	Clay	(United States) Jim Grabb	(France) Olivier Delaître (France) Fabrice Santoro	1–6, 6–3, 3–6
Loss	1–7	Aug 1998	Kitzbühel, Austria	World Series	Clay	(Australia) Andrew Kratzmann	(Netherlands) Tom Kempers (Argentina) Daniel Orsanic	3–6, 4–6
Loss	1–8	Mar 2000	Delray Beach, United States	World Series	Hard	(Australia) Andrew Florent	(United States) Brian MacPhie (Socialist Federal Republic of Yugoslavia) Nenad Zimonjić	5–7, 4–6
Loss	1–9	Apr 2000	Estoril, Portugal	World Series	Clay	(South Africa) David Adams	(United States) Donald Johnson (South Africa) Piet Norval	4–6, 5–7
Loss	1–10	Jul 2000	Kitzbühel, Austria	World Series	Clay	(Australia) Andrew Florent	(Argentina) Pablo Albano (Czech Republic) Cyril Suk	3–6, 6–3, 3–6
Loss	1–11	Aug 2000	Toronto, Canada	Masters Series	Hard	(Australia) Andrew Florent	(Canada) Sébastien Lareau (Canada) Daniel Nestor	3–6, 6–7^{(3–7)}
Win	2–11	Mar 2001	Dubai, United Arab Emirates	Championship Series	Hard	(Australia) Sandon Stolle	(Socialist Federal Republic of Yugoslavia) Nenad Zimonjić (Canada) Daniel Nestor	6–4, 6–4
Loss	2–12	Apr 2001	Monte-Carlo, Monaco	Masters Series	Clay	(Australia) Andrew Florent	(Sweden) Jonas Björkman (Australia) Todd Woodbridge	6–3, 4–6, 2–6
Loss	2–13	Jan 2002	Sydney, Australia	World Series	Hard	(Australia) Sandon Stolle	(United States) Donald Johnson (United States) Jared Palmer	4–6, 4–6
Loss	2–14	Mar 2002	Dubai, United Arab Emirates	Championship Series	Hard	(Australia) Sandon Stolle	(The Bahamas) Mark Knowles (Canada) Daniel Nestor	6–3, 3–6, [11–13]
Win	3–14	Jul 2002	Gstaad, Switzerland	World Series	Clay	(Czech Republic) David Rikl	(Italy) Massimo Bertolini (Italy) Cristian Brandi	7–6^{(7–5)}, 6–4
Win	4–14	Jul 2002	Stuttgart, Germany	World Series	Clay	(Czech Republic) David Rikl	(South Africa) David Adams (Argentina) Gastón Etlis	6–3, 6–4
Loss	4–15	Oct 2002	Moscow, Russia	International Series	Carpet	(Australia) Sandon Stolle	(Switzerland) Roger Federer (Belarus) Max Mirnyi	4–6, 6–7^{(0–7)}
Win	5–15	Oct 2002	Vienna, Austria	Championship Series	Hard	(Australia) Sandon Stolle	(Czech Republic) Jiří Novák (Czech Republic) Radek Štěpánek	6–4, 6–3
Loss	5–16	Jan 2003	Sydney, Australia	World Series	Hard	(India) Mahesh Bhupathi	(Australia) Paul Hanley (Australia) Nathan Healey	6–7^{(3–7)}, 4–6
Loss	5–17	May 2003	Munich, Germany	World Series	Clay	(United States) Jared Palmer	(Zimbabwe) Wayne Black (Zimbabwe) Kevin Ullyett	3–6, 5–7
Loss	5–18	Jun 2003	Nottingham, United Kingdom	World Series	Grass	(United States) Jared Palmer	(United States) Bob Bryan (United States) Mike Bryan	6–7^{(3–7)}, 6–4, 6–7^{(4–7)}
Loss	5–19	Aug 2003	Los Angeles, United States	World Series	Hard	(Netherlands) Sjeng Schalken	(United States) Jan-Michael Gambill (United States) Travis Parrott	4–6, 6–3, 5–7

== ATP Challenger and ITF Futures finals ==
=== Doubles (7–3) ===
Legend ATP Challenger (7–3) ITF Futures (0–0)	Finals by surface Hard (2–2) Clay (2–0) Grass (2–1) Carpet (1–0)

Result	W–L	Date	Tournament	Tier	Surface	Partner	Opponents	Score
Win	1–0	May 1993	Kuala Lumpur, Malaysia	Challenger	Hard	(Australia) Andrew Florent	(Netherlands) Joost Winnink (South Africa) Marius Barnard	6–4, 6–4
Win	2–0	Dec 1993	Adelaide, Australia	Challenger	Grass	(Australia) Andrew Florent	(Australia) Ben Ellwood (Australia) Mark Philippoussis	6–1, 6–3
Win	3–0	Dec 1993	Launceston, Australia	Challenger	Carpet	(Australia) Andrew Florent	(Australia) Michael Tebbutt (Australia) Sandon Stolle	6–4, 6–0
Loss	3–1	Jul 1994	Newcastle, United Kingdom	Challenger	Hard	(Netherlands) Tom Kempers	(United Kingdom) Neil Broad (Australia) Simon Youl	4–6, 7–6, 4–6
Win	4–1	Jul 1994	Oberstaufen, Germany	Challenger	Clay	(South Africa) Kirk Haygarth	(Spain) Álex López Morón (Italy) Massimo Valeri	6–3, 6–2
Loss	4–2	Apr 1995	Nagoya, Japan	Challenger	Hard	(Australia) Andrew Kratzmann	(India) Leander Paes (South Africa) Kevin Ullyett	6–7, 5–7
Win	5–2	Dec 1995	Perth, Australia	Challenger	Hard	(Australia) Andrew Florent	(Australia) Andrew Kratzmann (Australia) Wayne Arthurs	6–4, 6–4
Win	6–2	Jun 1996	Furth, Germany	Challenger	Clay	(Netherlands) Tom Kempers	(North Macedonia) Aleksandar Kitinov (Hungary) Gábor Köves	6–4, 6–7, 6–4
Loss	6–3	Jun 2002	Surbiton, United Kingdom	Challenger	Grass	(South Africa) David Adams	(Brazil) André Sá (United States) Jim Thomas	5–7, 6–2, 3–6
Win	7–3	Jun 2003	Surbiton, United Kingdom	Challenger	Grass	(Australia) Andrew Kratzmann	(France) Jean-François Bachelot (France) Gregory Carraz	6–3, 6–2

== Performance timelines ==
Key
W	F	SF	QF	#R	RR	Q#	DNQ	A	NH

(W) winner; (F) finalist; (SF) semifinalist; (QF) quarterfinalist; (#R) rounds 4, 3, 2, 1; (RR) round-robin stage; (Q#) qualification round; (DNQ) did not qualify; (A) absent; (NH) not held; (SR) strike rate (events won / competed); (W–L) win–loss record.

=== Singles ===
Tournament	1990	1991	1992	1993	1994	1995	1996	1997	1998	SR	W–L	Win%
Grand Slam tournaments
Australian Open	Q1	Q1	Q1	Q1	1R	Q1	Q1	A	Q3	0 / 1	0–1	0%
French Open	A	A	A	A	1R	Q2	A	A	A	0 / 1	0–1	0%
Wimbledon	A	A	A	A	Q1	Q1	Q1	A	A	0 / 0	0–0	–
US Open	A	A	A	A	Q3	Q1	A	A	A	0 / 0	0–0	–
Win–loss	0–0	0–0	0–0	0–0	0–2	0–0	0–0	0–0	0–0	0 / 2	0–2	0%

=== Doubles ===
Tournament	1991	1992	1993	1994	1995	1996	1997	1998	1999	2000	2001	2002	2003	2004	SR	W–L	Win%
Grand Slam tournaments
Australian Open	A	A	1R	2R	1R	2R	1R	2R	1R	QF	QF	3R	1R	1R	0 / 12	11–12	48%
French Open	A	A	A	3R	3R	1R	QF	3R	A	3R	3R	2R	3R	A	0 / 9	16–9	64%
Wimbledon	Q1	A	A	1R	2R	1R	1R	1R	A	2R	2R	3R	3R	1R	0 / 10	7–10	41%
US Open	A	A	A	1R	1R	1R	1R	1R	A	1R	3R	1R	3R	A	0 / 9	3–9	25%
Win–loss	0–0	0–0	0–1	3–4	3–4	1–4	3–4	3–4	0–1	6–4	8–4	5–4	5–4	0–2	0 / 40	37–40	48%
Year-end championships
ATP Finals	Did not qualify							Alt	DNQ	RR	Did not qualify				0 / 2	2–2	50%
ATP Tour Masters 1000
Indian Wells	A	A	A	A	A	2R	1R	SF	1R	1R	SF	QF	2R		0 / 8	10–8	56%
Miami	A	A	A	A	A	QF	A	2R	2R	A	A	QF	2R	A	0 / 5	7–5	58%
Monte Carlo	A	A	A	A	A	1R	1R	1R	1R	2R	F	1R	2R	A	0 / 8	6–8	43%
Hamburg	A	A	A	A	2R	1R	QF	QF	A	SF	1R	QF	2R	A	0 / 8	11–8	58%
Rome Masters	A	A	A	A	2R	QF	2R	1R	A	2R	1R	SF	QF	A	0 / 8	9–8	53%
Canada Masters	A	A	A	A	A	A	1R	2R	A	F	A	SF	QF	A	0 / 5	10–5	67%
Cincinnati Masters	A	A	A	A	A	1R	1R	1R	A	2R	A	QF	1R	A	0 / 6	3–6	33%
Stuttgart	Not Masters Series									1R	1R	Not Masters Series			0 / 2	0–2	0%
Madrid	Not Held											2R	A	A	0 / 1	0–1	0%
Paris	A	A	A	A	A	A	QF	1R	A	A	QF	2R	A	A	0 / 4	3–4	43%
Win–loss	0–0	0–0	0–0	0–0	2–2	6–6	5–7	6–8	0–3	14–7	4–6	15–9	7–7	0–0	0 / 55	59–55	52%

=== Mixed doubles ===
Tournament	1994	1995	1996	1997	1998	1999	2000	2001	2002	2003	SR	W–L	Win%
Australian Open	A	A	A	QF	1R	1R	A	F	1R	2R	0 / 6	7–6	54%
French Open	3R	2R	1R	1R	QF	A	1R	1R	2R	1R	0 / 9	6–9	40%
Wimbledon	A	2R	3R	1R	1R	A	SF	1R	3R	2R	0 / 8	10–8	56%
US Open	A	A	QF	1R	1R	A	QF	2R	A	1R	0 / 6	5–6	45%
Win–loss	2–1	2–2	4–3	2–4	2–4	0–1	6–3	5–4	3–3	2–4	0 / 29	28–29	49%
