= Andrew Florent =

Australian tennis player

- Country (sports): Australia
- Born: 24 October 1970 Melbourne, Victoria, Australia
- Died: 16 August 2016 (aged 45)
- Height: 188 cm (6 ft 2 in)
- Turned pro: 1990
- Plays: Right-handed
- Prize money: $1,113,285

Singles
- Career record: 0–0
- Career titles: 0; 0 Challenger, 0 Futures
- Highest ranking: No. 610 (10 May 1993)

Grand Slam singles results
- Australian Open: Q3 (1993)

Doubles
- Career record: 211–225
- Career titles: 3; 5 Challenger, 0 Futures
- Highest ranking: No. 13 (30 April 2001)

Grand Slam doubles results
- Australian Open: QF (2000, 2001)
- French Open: QF (1997)
- Wimbledon: QF (2002)
- US Open: 3R (2001)

Other doubles tournaments
- Tour Finals: RR (1998, 2000)

Grand Slam mixed doubles results
- Australian Open: QF (1998)
- French Open: 3R (1996)
- Wimbledon: QF (1995)
- US Open: 2R (1996, 1997, 1999, 2001)
- Last updated on: 17 May 2023.

Andrew Florent (24 October 1970 – 16 August 2016) was an Australian professional tennis player.

Florent was born in Melbourne to parents who had migrated from Mauritius. He enjoyed most of his tennis success while playing doubles. During his career he won 3 doubles titles and finished runner-up an additional 10 times. He achieved a career-high doubles ranking of world No. 13 in 2001.

Florent died from colorectal cancer at the age of 45 on 16 August 2016. He is the father of AFL footballer Oliver Florent.

== Junior Grand Slam finals ==
=== Singles: 1 (1 runner-up) ===
Result	Year	Tournament	Surface	Opponent	Score
Loss	1988	Australian Open	Hard	(Australia) Johan Anderson	5–7, 6–7^{(4–7)}

== ATP career finals ==
=== Doubles: 13 (3 titles, 10 runner-ups) ===
Legend Grand Slam Tournaments (0–0) ATP World Tour Finals (0–0) ATP Masters Series (0–2) ATP Championship Series (0–1) ATP World Series (3–7)	Finals by surface Hard (1–4) Clay (2–5) Grass (0–1) Carpet (0–0)	Finals by setting Outdoors (3–10) Indoors (0–0)

Result	W–L	Date	Tournament	Tier	Surface	Partner	Opponents	Score
Loss	0–1	May 1994	Bologna, Italy	World Series	Clay	(Czech Republic) Vojtěch Flégl	(Australia) John Fitzgerald (Australia) Patrick Rafter	3–6, 3–6
Win	1–1	Jun 1994	St. Poelten, Austria	World Series	Clay	(Czech Republic) Vojtěch Flégl	(Malaysia) Adam Malik (United States) Jeff Tarango	3–6, 6–1, 6–4
Loss	1–2	Aug 1994	Long Island, United States	World Series	Hard	(United Kingdom) Mark Petchey	(France) Olivier Delaître (France) Guy Forget	4–6, 6–7
Loss	1–3	Apr 1995	Seoul, South Korea	World Series	Hard	(Australia) Joshua Eagle	(Canada) Sébastien Lareau (United States) Jeff Tarango	3–6, 2–6
Loss	1–4	Jul 1996	Oporto, Portugal	World Series	Clay	(Australia) Joshua Eagle	(Portugal) Emanuel Couto (Portugal) Bernardo Mota	6–4, 4–6, 4–6
Win	2–4	Jan 1998	Adelaide, Australia	World Series	Hard	(Australia) Joshua Eagle	(South Africa) Ellis Ferreira (United States) Rick Leach	6–4, 6–7, 6–3
Loss	2–5	May 1998	Munich, Germany	World Series	Clay	(Australia) Joshua Eagle	(Australia) Todd Woodbridge (Australia) Mark Woodforde	0–6, 3–6
Loss	2–6	Jun 1998	s'Hertogenbosch, Netherlands	International Series	Grass	(Australia) Joshua Eagle	(France) Guillaume Raoux (Netherlands) Jan Siemerink	6–7, 2–6
Win	3–6	May 1999	St. Poelten, Austria	International Series	Clay	(Russia) Andrei Olhovskiy	(South Africa) Brent Haygarth (South Africa) Robbie Koenig	5–7, 6–4, 7–5
Loss	3–7	Mar 2000	Delray Beach, United States	International Series	Hard	(Australia) Joshua Eagle	(United States) Brian MacPhie (Socialist Federal Republic of Yugoslavia) Nenad Zimonjić	5–7, 4–6
Loss	3–8	Jul 2000	Kitzbühel, Austria	Championship Series	Clay	(Australia) Joshua Eagle	(Argentina) Pablo Albano (Czech Republic) Cyril Suk	3–6, 6–3, 3–6
Loss	3–9	Aug 2000	Toronto, Canada	Masters Series	Hard	(Australia) Joshua Eagle	(Canada) Sébastien Lareau (Canada) Daniel Nestor	3–6, 6–7
Loss	3–10	Apr 2001	Monte Carlo, Monaco	Masters Series	Clay	(Australia) Joshua Eagle	(Sweden) Jonas Björkman (Australia) Todd Woodbridge	6–3, 4–6, 2–6

== ATP Challenger and ITF Futures finals ==
=== Doubles: 7 (5–2) ===
Legend ATP Challenger (5–2) ITF Futures (0–0)	Finals by surface Hard (2–0) Clay (1–1) Grass (1–1) Carpet (1–0)

Result	W–L	Date	Tournament	Tier	Surface	Partner	Opponents	Score
Loss	0–1	Dec 1992	Perth, Australia	Challenger	Grass	(Australia) Andrew McLean	(South Africa) Lan Bale (South Africa) David Nainkin	6–3, 6–7, 5–7
Win	1–1	May 1993	Kuala Lumpur, Malaysia	Challenger	Hard	(Australia) Joshua Eagle	(South Africa) Marius Barnard (Netherlands) Joost Winnink	6–4, 6–4
Win	2–1	Dec 1993	Adelaide, Australia	Challenger	Grass	(Australia) Joshua Eagle	(Australia) Ben Ellwood (Australia) Mark Philippoussis	6–1, 6–3
Win	3–1	Dec 1993	Launceston, Australia	Challenger	Carpet	(Australia) Joshua Eagle	(Australia) Sandon Stolle (Australia) Michael Tebbutt	6–4, 6–0
Loss	3–2	May 1994	Bochum, Germany	Challenger	Clay	(North Macedonia) Aleksandar Kitinov	(Australia) Grant Doyle (Australia) Michael Tebbutt	6–4, 6–7, 6–7
Win	4–2	Jun 1994	Furth, Germany	Challenger	Clay	(Czech Republic) Vojtech Flegl	(Argentina) Gaston Etlis (Argentina) Christian Miniussi	7–6, 6–1
Win	5–2	Dec 1995	Perth, Australia	Challenger	Hard	(Australia) Joshua Eagle	(Australia) Wayne Arthurs (Australia) Andrew Kratzmann	6–4, 6–4

== Performance Timelines ==
Key
W	F	SF	QF	#R	RR	Q#	P#	DNQ	A	Z#	PO	G	S	B	NMS	NTI	P	NH

(W) winner; (F) finalist; (SF) semifinalist; (QF) quarterfinalist; (#R) rounds 4, 3, 2, 1; (RR) round-robin stage; (Q#) qualification round; (P#) preliminary round; (DNQ) did not qualify; (A) absent; (Z#) Davis/Fed Cup Zonal Group (with number indication) or (PO) play-off; (G) gold, (S) silver or (B) bronze Olympic/Paralympic medal; (NMS) not a Masters tournament; (NTI) not a Tier I tournament; (P) postponed; (NH) not held; (SR) strike rate (events won / competed); (W–L) win–loss record.

=== Doubles ===
Tournament	1989	1990	1991	1992	1993	1994	1995	1996	1997	1998	1999	2000	2001	2002	2003	SR	W–L	Win %
Grand Slam tournaments
Australian Open	1R	A	A	A	A	2R	1R	2R	1R	2R	2R	QF	QF	2R	1R	0 / 11	11–11	50%
French Open	A	A	A	A	A	A	3R	1R	QF	3R	2R	3R	3R	1R	A	0 / 8	12–8	60%
Wimbledon	A	A	A	A	A	A	2R	1R	1R	1R	2R	2R	2R	QF	A	0 / 8	7–8	47%
US Open	A	A	A	A	A	1R	1R	1R	1R	1R	2R	1R	3R	1R	A	0 / 9	3–9	25%
Win–loss	0–1	0–0	0–0	0–0	0–0	1–2	3–4	1–4	3–4	3–4	4–4	6–4	8–4	4–4	0–1	0 / 36	33–36	48%
Year-End Championships
ATP Finals	Did Not Qualify									RR	DNQ	RR	Did Not Qualify			0 / 2	2–2	50%
ATP Masters 1000 Series
Indian Wells	A	A	A	A	A	A	QF	2R	1R	SF	SF	1R	SF	2R	A	0 / 8	13–8	62%
Miami	A	A	A	A	A	A	1R	QF	A	2R	QF	A	A	1R	A	0 / 5	5–5	50%
Monte Carlo	A	A	A	A	A	A	A	1R	1R	1R	1R	2R	F	2R	A	0 / 7	6–7	46%
Hamburg	A	A	A	A	A	A	2R	1R	QF	QF	QF	SF	1R	A	A	0 / 7	10–7	59%
Rome	A	A	A	A	A	Q2	2R	QF	2R	1R	2R	2R	1R	1R	A	0 / 8	6–8	43%
Canada	A	A	A	A	A	A	A	A	1R	A	2R	F	2R	1R	A	0 / 5	6–5	55%
Cincinnati	A	A	A	A	A	A	Q2	1R	1R	1R	SF	2R	QF	2R	A	0 / 7	7–7	50%
Stuttgart	A	A	A	A	A	A	A	A	1R	1R	2R	1R	1R	NMS		0 / 5	1–5	17%
Paris	A	A	A	A	A	A	A	A	A	1R	2R	A	1R	A	A	0 / 3	0–3	0%
Win–loss	0–0	0–0	0–0	0–0	0–0	0–0	4–4	6–6	3–7	5–8	13–9	10–7	10–8	3–6	0–0	0 / 55	54–55	50%

=== Mixed Doubles ===
Tournament	1995	1996	1997	1998	1999	2000	2001	2002	2003	SR	W–L	Win%
Grand Slam tournaments
Australian Open	1R	A	2R	QF	1R	A	1R	A	1R	0 / 6	3–6	33%
French Open	1R	3R	1R	2R	1R	2R	2R	A	A	0 / 7	4–7	36%
Wimbledon	QF	1R	1R	1R	2R	1R	1R	2R	A	0 / 8	5–8	38%
US Open	1R	2R	2R	1R	2R	1R	2R	A	A	0 / 7	4–7	36%
Win–loss	3–4	3–3	2–4	2–4	2–4	1–3	2–4	1–1	0–1	0 / 28	16–28	36%
