= Oporto Open =

Defunct tennis tournament
- Event name: Oporto Open
- Tour: ATP Tour
- Founded: 1995
- Abolished: 1996
- Editions: 2
- Location: Porto, Maia, Portugal
- Venue: Complexo de Ténis da Maia
- Surface: Clay / outdoor

The Oporto Open (a.k.a. Maia Open) is a defunct ATP Tour affiliated men's tennis tournament played from 1995 to 1996. It was held in Porto, Maia, Portugal and was played on outdoor clay courts.

== Results ==
=== Singles ===
Year	Champion	Runner-up	Score
1996	(Spain) Félix Mantilla	(Argentina) Hernán Gumy	6–7, 6–4, 6–3
1995	(Spain) Alberto Berasategui	(Spain) Carlos Costa	3–6, 6–3, 6–4

=== Doubles ===
Year	Champions	Runners-up	Score
1996	(Portugal) Emanuel Couto (Portugal) Bernardo Mota	(Australia) Joshua Eagle (Australia) Andrew Florent	4–6, 6–4, 6–4
1995	(Spain) Tomás Carbonell (Spain) Francisco Roig	(Spain) Jordi Arrese (Spain) Àlex Corretja	6–3, 7–6
