= Hernán Gumy =

Argentine tennis player

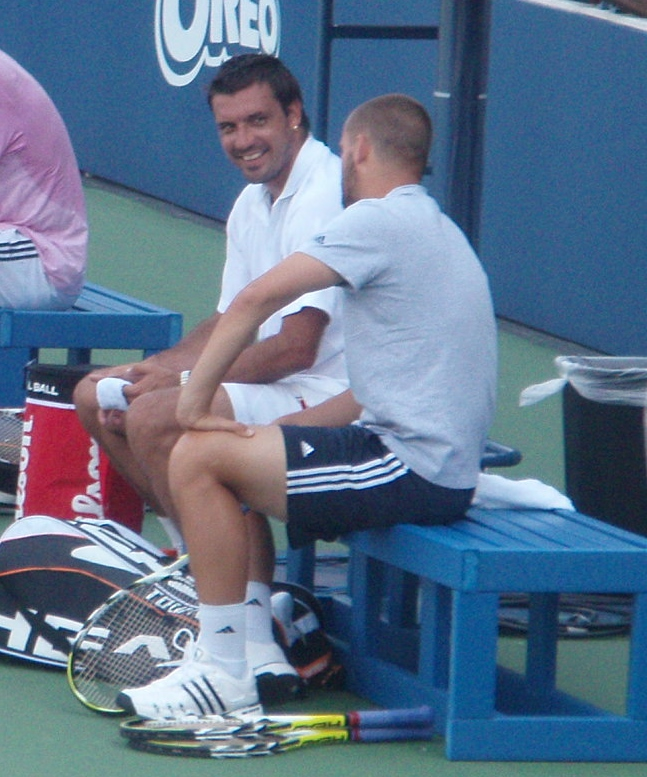
- Country (sports): Argentina
- Residence: Buenos Aires, Argentina
- Born: 5 March 1972 (age 54) Buenos Aires, Argentina
- Height: 1.88 m (6 ft 2 in)
- Turned pro: 1991
- Retired: 2001
- Plays: Right-handed (one-handed backhand)
- Prize money: $1,226,776

Singles
- Career record: 115–128
- Career titles: 1
- Highest ranking: No. 39 (19 August 1996)

Grand Slam singles results
- Australian Open: 3R (1996)
- French Open: 3R (1998)
- Wimbledon: 1R (1998, 1999, 2000)
- US Open: 3R (1996, 1997)

Other tournaments
- Olympic Games: 1R (1996)

Doubles
- Career record: 5–11
- Career titles: 0
- Highest ranking: No. 232 (6 June 1994)
Medal record
Pan American Games
Gold medal – first place	1995 Mar del Plata	Men's singles
- Last updated on: 6 December 2021.

Hernán Pablo Gumy (Spanish pronunciation: [eɾˈnaŋ ˈɡumi]; born 5 March 1972) is an Argentine former tennis player, who turned professional in 1991. He represented his native country at the 1996 Summer Olympics in Atlanta, where he was defeated in the first round by Venezuela's Nicolás Pereira. Gumy made two finals in his career; both of them ATP 250s on clay in 1996. He won Santiago, Chile (his final tournament of 1996) by beating the Spanish World No. 15 Félix Mantilla in a tough three-setter: in the semi-finals, and the Chilean world number 11 Marcelo Ríos in the final 6–4, 7–5. He lost the other final he was in, in Porto, Portugal to Spain's Félix Mantilla despite winning the first set.

The right-hander reached his highest singles ATP-ranking on 19 August 1996, when he became World No. 39. Gumy won the gold medal in the men's singles competition at the 1995 Pan American Games.

== Coaching ==
Gumy has been coaching Svetlana Kuznetsova.

Gumy has coached former World No. 1 and US and Australian Open champion Marat Safin as well as Guillermo Cañas and Ernests Gulbis.

== ATP career finals ==
=== Singles: 2 (1 title, 1 runner-up) ===
Legend Grand Slam Tournaments (0–0) ATP World Tour Finals (0–0) ATP Masters Series (0–0) ATP Championship Series (0–0) ATP World Series (1–1)	Finals by surface Hard (0–0) Clay (1–1) Grass (0–0) Carpet (0–0)	Finals by setting Outdoors (1–1) Indoors (0–0)

Result	W–L	Date	Tournament	Tier	Surface	Opponent	Score
Loss	0–1	Jun 1996	Porto, Portugal	World Series	Clay	(Spain) Félix Mantilla	7–6^{(7–5)}, 4–6, 3–6
Win	1–1	Nov 1996	Santiago, Chile	World Series	Clay	(Chile) Marcelo Ríos	6–4, 7–5

== ATP Challenger and ITF Futures Finals ==
=== Singles: 11 (6–5) ===
Legend ATP Challenger (6–5) ITF Futures (0–0)	Finals by surface Hard (0–1) Clay (6–4) Grass (0–0) Carpet (0–0)

Result	W–L	Date	Tournament	Tier	Surface	Opponent	Score
Loss	0–1	Apr 1994	São Paulo, Brazil	Challenger	Clay	(Argentina) Gabriel Markus	6–2, 4–6, 4–6
Win	1–1	May 1994	Budapest, Hungary	Challenger	Clay	(United States) Francisco Montana	6–4, 6–2
Win	2–1	May 1994	Bochum, Germany	Challenger	Clay	(Germany) Lars Koslowski	3–6, 6–3, 6–1
Loss	2–2	Oct 1994	Lima, Peru	Challenger	Clay	(Norway) Christian Ruud	6–3, 5–7, 3–6
Win	3–2	May 1996	Budapest, Hungary	Challenger	Clay	(Morocco) Karim Alami	2–6, 6–2, 6–3
Win	4–2	Apr 1998	Paget, Bermuda	Challenger	Clay	(Argentina) Lucas Arnold Ker	7–6, 4–6, 6–2
Loss	4–3	Mar 1999	Salinas, Colombia	Challenger	Hard	(Argentina) Juan Ignacio Chela	4–6, 6–7
Win	5–3	Apr 1999	Paget, Bermuda	Challenger	Clay	(Argentina) Guillermo Cañas	6–3, 7–6^{(7–3)}
Win	6–3	Oct 1999	São Paulo, Brazil	Challenger	Clay	(France) Thierry Guardiola	7–6, 6–3
Loss	6–4	Nov 1999	Buenos Aires, Argentina	Challenger	Clay	(Argentina) Franco Squillari	7–5, 1–6, 4–6
Loss	6–5	Sep 2000	Biella, Italy	Challenger	Clay	(Italy) Filippo Volandri	3–6, 2–6

=== Doubles: 2 (0–2) ===
Legend ATP Challenger (0–2) ITF Futures (0–0)	Finals by surface Hard (0–0) Clay (0–2) Grass (0–0) Carpet (0–0)

Result	W–L	Date	Tournament	Tier	Surface	Partner	Opponents	Score
Loss	0–1	Feb 1995	Mar del Plata, Argentina	Challenger	Clay	(Spain) Jordi Burillo	(Argentina) Javier Frana (Argentina) Luis Lobo	6–7, 0–6
Loss	0–2	Apr 1999	Barletta, Italy	Challenger	Clay	(Argentina) Gastón Gaudio	(Argentina) Guillermo Cañas (Spain) Javier Sánchez	6–4, 2–6, 2–6

== Performance timeline ==
Key
W	F	SF	QF	#R	RR	Q#	DNQ	A	NH

(W) winner; (F) finalist; (SF) semifinalist; (QF) quarterfinalist; (#R) rounds 4, 3, 2, 1; (RR) round-robin stage; (Q#) qualification round; (DNQ) did not qualify; (A) absent; (NH) not held; (SR) strike rate (events won / competed); (W–L) win–loss record.

=== Singles ===
Tournament	1995	1996	1997	1998	1999	2000	2001	SR	W–L	Win %
Grand Slam tournaments
Australian Open	A	3R	2R	A	1R	1R	A	0 / 4	3–4	43%
French Open	1R	1R	1R	3R	2R	2R	Q1	0 / 6	4–6	40%
Wimbledon	A	A	A	1R	1R	1R	A	0 / 3	0–3	0%
US Open	2R	3R	3R	2R	1R	2R	A	0 / 6	7–6	54%
Win–loss	1–2	4–3	3–3	3–3	1–4	2–4	0–0	0 / 19	14–19	42%
ATP Masters Series
Indian Wells	A	1R	1R	A	A	A	A	0 / 2	0–2	0%
Miami	A	1R	2R	A	A	1R	A	0 / 3	1–3	25%
Monte Carlo	A	2R	1R	A	A	Q1	A	0 / 2	1–2	33%
Hamburg	A	2R	1R	A	A	A	A	0 / 2	1–2	33%
Rome	A	3R	2R	1R	A	Q2	A	0 / 3	3–3	50%
Canada	A	1R	A	A	A	A	A	0 / 1	0–1	0%
Stuttgart	A	1R	A	A	A	A	A	0 / 1	0–1	0%
Win–loss	0–0	4–7	2–5	0–1	0–0	0–1	0–0	0 / 14	6–14	30%
