= 1996 in tennis =

This page covers all the important events in the sport of tennis in 1996. Primarily, it provides the results of notable tournaments throughout the year on both the ATP and WTA Tours, the Davis Cup, and the Fed Cup.

== ITF ==
=== Grand Slam events ===
==== Australian Open ====
Championship	Champions	Finalists	Score in the final
Men's singles	(Germany) Boris Becker	(United States) Michael Chang	6–2, 6–4, 2–6, 6–2
Women's singles	(United States) Monica Seles	(Germany) Anke Huber	6–4, 6–1
Men's doubles	(Sweden) Stefan Edberg (Czech Republic) Petr Korda	(Canada) Sébastien Lareau (United States) Alex O'Brien	7–5, 7–5, 4–6, 6–1
Women's doubles	(United States) Chanda Rubin (Spain) Arantxa Sánchez	(United States) Lindsay Davenport (United States) Mary Joe Fernández	7–5, 2–6, 6–4
Mixed doubles	(Latvia) Larisa Neiland (Australia) Mark Woodforde	(United States) Nicole Arendt (United States) Luke Jensen	4–6, 7–5, 6–0

==== French Open ====
Championship	Champions	Finalists	Score in the final
Men's singles	(Russia) Yevgeny Kafelnikov	(Germany) Michael Stich	7–6^{(7–4)}, 7–5, 7–6^{(7–4)}
Women's singles	(Germany) Steffi Graf	(Spain) Arantxa Sánchez	6–3, 6–7^{(4–7)}, 10–8
Men's doubles	(Russia) Yevgeny Kafelnikov (Czech Republic) Daniel Vacek	(France) Guy Forget (Switzerland) Jakob Hlasek	6–2, 6–3
Women's doubles	(United States) Lindsay Davenport (United States) Mary Joe Fernández	(United States) Gigi Fernández (Belarus) Natasha Zvereva	6–2, 6–1
Mixed doubles	(Argentina) Javier Frana (Argentina) Patricia Tarabini	(United States) Nicole Arendt (United States) Luke Jensen	6–2, 6–2

==== Wimbledon ====
Championship	Champions	Finalists	Score in the final
Men's singles	(Netherlands) Richard Krajicek	(United States) MaliVai Washington	6–3, 6–4, 6–3
Women's singles	(Germany) Steffi Graf	(Spain) Arantxa Sánchez	6–3, 7–5
Men's doubles	(Australia) Todd Woodbridge (Australia) Mark Woodforde	(Zimbabwe) Byron Black (Canada) Grant Connell	4–6, 6–1, 6–3, 6–2
Women's doubles	(Switzerland) Martina Hingis (Czech Republic) Helena Suková	(United States) Meredith McGrath (Latvia) Larisa Neiland	5–7, 7–5, 6–1
Mixed doubles	(Czech Republic) Cyril Suk (Czech Republic) Helena Suková	(Latvia) Larisa Neiland (Australia) Mark Woodforde	1–6, 6–3, 6–2

==== US Open ====
Championship	Champions	Finalists	Score in the final
Men's singles	(United States) Pete Sampras	(United States) Michael Chang	6–1, 6–4, 7–6^{(7–3)}
Women's singles	(Germany) Steffi Graf	(United States) Monica Seles	7–5, 6–4
Men's doubles	(Australia) Todd Woodbridge (Australia) Mark Woodforde	(Netherlands) Jacco Eltingh (Netherlands) Paul Haarhuis	4–6, 7–6^{(7–5)}, 7–6^{(7–2)}
Women's doubles	(United States) Gigi Fernández (Belarus) Natasha Zvereva	(Czech Republic) Jana Novotná (Spain) Arantxa Sánchez	1–6, 6–1, 6–4
Mixed doubles	(United States) Patrick Galbraith (United States) Lisa Raymond	(Netherlands) Manon Bollegraf (United States) Rick Leach	7–6^{(8–6)}, 7–6^{(7–4)}

=== Davis Cup ===
World Group Draw

First round 9–11 February
Rome, Italy (clay)
Russia	2
Italy	3
Johannesburg, South Africa (indoor hard)
Austria	2
South Africa	3
Geneva, Switzerland (indoor clay)
Germany	5
Switzerland	0
Besançon, France (indoor hard)
France	5
Denmark	0
Jaipur, India (grass)
India	3
Netherlands	2
Katrineholm, Sweden (indoor carpet)
Belgium	1
Sweden	4
Plzeň, Czech Republic (indoor carpet)
Hungary	0
Czech Republic	5
Carlsbad, California, United States (hard)
Mexico	0
United States	5

Quarterfinals; 5–7 April
Rome, Italy (clay)
Italy	4
South Africa	1
Limoges, France (indoor clay)
Germany	0
France	5
Calcutta, India (grass)
India	0
Sweden	5
Prague, Czech Republic (indoor carpet)
Czech Republic	3
United States	2

Semifinals; 20–22 September
Nantes, France (indoor carpet)
Italy	2
France	3
Prague, Czech Republic (indoor carpet)
Sweden	4
Czech Republic	1

Final; 29 November - 1 December
Malmö, Sweden (indoor hard)
France	3
Sweden	2

==== Final ====
Sweden
2
Massan Hall, Malmö, Sweden
29 November–1 December
Hard (indoors)

France
3

			1	2	3	4	5
1	(Sweden) (France)	Stefan Edberg; Cédric Pioline	3; 6	4; 6	3; 6
2	(Sweden) (France)	Thomas Enqvist; Arnaud Boetsch	6; 4	6; 3	7^{7} 6^{2}
3	(Sweden) (France)	Jonas Björkman / Nicklas Kulti; Guy Forget / Guillaume Raoux	3; 6	6; 1	3; 6	3; 6
4	(Sweden) (France)	Thomas Enqvist; Cédric Pioline	3; 6	6^{9} 7^{11}	6; 4	6; 4	9; 7
5	(Sweden) (France)	Nicklas Kulti; Arnaud Boetsch	6^{2} 7^{7}	6; 2	6; 4	6^{5} 7^{7}	8; 10

=== Fed Cup ===
1996 Champions
(United States)
United States
15th title

United States
5
Boardwalk Hall, Atlantic City, United States
28–29 September
Carpet (indoors)

Spain
0

			1	2	3
1	(United States) (Spain)	Monica Seles; Conchita Martínez	6; 2	6; 4
2	(United States) (Spain)	Lindsay Davenport; Arantxa Sánchez	7; 5	6; 1
3	(United States) (Spain)	Monica Seles; Arantxa Sánchez	3; 6	6; 3	6; 1
4	(United States) (Spain)	Lindsay Davenport; Gala León	7; 5	6; 2
5	(United States) (Spain)	Mary Joe Fernández / Linda Wild; Gala León / Virginia Ruano	6; 1	6; 4

=== Hopman Cup ===
1996 Champions
(Croatia)
Croatia
1st title

Croatia
2
Burswood Entertainment Complex, Perth, Australia
6 January 1996
Hard (indoors)

Switzerland
1

			1	2	3
1	(Croatia) (Switzerland)	Iva Majoli; Martina Hingis	3; 6	0; 6
2	(Croatia) (Switzerland)	Goran Ivanišević; Marc Rosset	7; 6	7; 5
3	(Croatia) (Switzerland)	Goran Ivanišević / Iva Majoli; Marc Rosset / Martina Hingis	3; 6	7; 6	5; 5	retired

=== Olympics ===
Championship	Gold medalists	Silver medalists	Bronze medalists
Men's singles	(United States) Andre Agassi	(Spain) Sergi Bruguera	(India) Leander Paes
Women's singles	(United States) Lindsay Davenport	(Spain) Arantxa Sánchez	(Czech Republic) Jana Novotná
Men's doubles	(Australia) Todd Woodbridge (Australia) Mark Woodforde	(United Kingdom) Neil Broad (United Kingdom) Tim Henman	(Germany) Marc-Kevin Goellner (Germany) David Prinosil
Women's doubles	(United States) Gigi Fernández (United States) Mary Joe Fernández	(Czech Republic) Jana Novotná (Czech Republic) Helena Suková	(Spain) Conchita Martínez (Spain) Arantxa Sánchez

== ATP Tour/WTA Tour ==
=== Tour Championships ===
==== Singles ====
	Category	Champions	Finalists	Score in the final
Men	Hanover	(United States) Pete Sampras	(Germany) Boris Becker	3–6, 7–6^{(7–5)}, 7–6^{(7–4)}, 6–7^{(11–13)}, 6–4
Women	New York	(Germany) Steffi Graf	(Switzerland) Martina Hingis	6–3, 4–6, 6–0, 4–6, 6–0

==== Doubles ====
	Category	Champions	Finalists	Score in the final
Men	Hartford	(Australia) Todd Woodbridge (Australia) Mark Woodforde	(Canada) Sébastien Lareau (United States) Alex O'Brien	6–4, 5–7, 6–2, 7–6^{(7–3)}
Women	New York	(United States) Lindsay Davenport (United States) Mary Joe Fernández	(Czech Republic) Jana Novotná (Spain) Arantxa Sánchez	6–3, 6–2

== Tennis Hall of Fame ==
Class	Inductees	Category
Class of 1996	(United States) Rosemary Casals	Player
Class of 1996	(United Kingdom) Dan Maskell	Contributor
