= 1995 Campionati Internazionali di Sicilia – Singles =

Singles
- 1995 Campionati Internazionali di Sicilia

Final
- Champion: (Spain) Francisco Clavet
- Runner-up: (Spain) Jordi Burillo
- Score: 6–7^{(2–7)}, 6–3, 7–6^{(7–1)}

Details
- Draw: 32 (4Q/3WC)
- Seeds: 8

Events
Singles	Doubles
← 1994 ·	Campionati Internazionali di Sicilia	· 1996 →

Alberto Berasategui was the defending champion, but lost in first round to qualifier Magnus Norman.

Francisco Clavet won the title by defeating Jordi Burillo 6–7^{(2–7)}, 6–3, 7–6^{(7–1)} in the final.

== Seeds ==
1. (Spain) Alberto Berasategui (first round)
2. (Italy) Andrea Gaudenzi (first round)
3. (Austria) Gilbert Schaller (second round)
4. (Spain) Àlex Corretja (second round)
5. (Spain) Francisco Clavet (champion)
6. (Czech Republic) Bohdan Ulihrach (second round)
7. (Spain) Jordi Arrese (first round)
8. (Spain) Javier Sánchez (second round)

== Draw ==
=== Key ===
- Q = Qualifier
- WC = Wild card
- LL = Lucky loser
- Alt = Alternate
- ITF = ITF entry
- PR = Protected ranking
- SR = Special ranking
- SE = Special exempt
- JE = Junior exempt
- JR = Junior Accelerator Programme entrant
- CO = College Accelerator Programme entrant
- NG = Next Gen Accelerator Program entrant
- w/o = Walkover
- r = Retired
- d = Defaulted

=== Finals ===
Semifinals
(Argentina) Hernán Gumy	0	3
5	(Spain) Francisco Clavet	6	6
WC	(Italy) Omar Camporese	7^{7}	3	2
(Spain) Jordi Burillo	6^{1}	6	6

Final
5	(Spain) Francisco Clavet	6^{2}	6	7^{7}
(Spain) Jordi Burillo	7^{7}	3	6^{1}

=== Top half ===
First round
1	(Spain) A Berasategui	2	5
Q	(Sweden) M Norman	6	7
(Argentina) H Gumy	3	6	6
(Argentina) G Etlis	6	4	1
Q	(Italy) C Borroni	5	5
(France) F Santoro	7	7
(Portugal) N Marques	6	3	4
8	(Spain) J Sánchez	4	6	6
3	(Austria) G Schaller	7	6
(South Africa) M Ondruska	5	4
(Spain) T Carbonell	7	4	7
WC	(Italy) D Nargiso	5	6	5
(Romania) A Voinea	6	6
Q	(Italy) M Meneschincheri	4	2
(Germany) O Gross	7	5	4
5	(Spain) F Clavet	5	7	6

Second round
Q	(Sweden) M Norman	4	1
(Argentina) H Gumy	6	6
(France) F Santoro	6	6
8	(Spain) J Sánchez	3	3
3	(Austria) G Schaller	7^{7}	4	4
(Spain) T Carbonell	6^{3}	6	6
(Romania) A Voinea	2	6^{4}
5	(Spain) F Clavet	6	7^{7}

Quarterfinals
(Argentina) H Gumy	3	6	6
(France) F Santoro	6	3	3
(Spain) T Carbonell	4	6^{0}
5	(Spain) F Clavet	6	7^{7}

Semifinals
(Argentina) H Gumy	0	3
5	(Spain) F Clavet	6	6

=== Bottom half ===
First round
6	(Czech Republic) B Ulihrach	6	6
(Czech Republic) K Nováček	3	3
WC	(France) H Leconte	6^{8}	4
(Germany) MK Goellner	7^{10}	6
WC	(Italy) O Camporese	7^{7}	6^{4}	6
(Australia) R Fromberg	6^{2}	7^{7}	3
Q	(Sweden) N Utgren	1	4
4	(Spain) À Corretja	6	6
7	(Spain) J Arrese	6	4	4
(Spain) A López Morón	4	6	6
(Spain) J Burillo	6	6
(Germany) CU Steeb	1	4
(Sweden) M Gustafsson	6	6
(Spain) Ó Martínez	4	1
(Netherlands) S Schalken	6	6
2	(Italy) A Gaudenzi	4	2

Second round
6	(Czech Republic) B Ulihrach	4	4
(Germany) MK Goellner	6	6
WC	(Italy) O Camporese	6	3	7^{7}
4	(Spain) À Corretja	3	6	6^{4}
(Spain) A López Morón	6^{4}	6	3
(Spain) J Burillo	7^{7}	4	6
(Sweden) M Gustafsson	4	3
(Netherlands) S Schalken	6	6

Quarterfinals
(Germany) MK Goellner	7	6^{4}	6^{3}
WC	(Italy) O Camporese	5	7^{7}	7^{7}
(Spain) J Burillo	6^{4}	6	6
(Netherlands) S Schalken	7^{7}	3	4

Semifinals
WC	(Italy) O Camporese	7^{7}	3	2
(Spain) J Burillo	6^{1}	6	6
