= 1997 Campionati Internazionali di Sicilia – Singles =

Singles
- 1997 Campionati Internazionali di Sicilia

Final
- Champion: (Spain) Alberto Berasategui
- Runner-up: (Slovakia) Dominik Hrbatý
- Score: 6–4, 6–2

Details
- Draw: 32
- Seeds: 8

Events
Singles	Doubles
← 1996 ·	Campionati Internazionali di Sicilia	· 1998 →

Karim Alami was the defending champion, but lost in the quarter-finals to Alberto Berasategui.

Alberto Berasategui won the title by defeating Dominik Hrbatý 6–4, 6–2 in the final.

== Seeds ==
1. (Spain) Àlex Corretja (semifinals)
2. (Spain) Alberto Berasategui (Winner)
3. (Spain) Albert Portas (quarterfinals)
4. (Morocco) Hicham Arazi (first round)
5. (Uruguay) Marcelo Filippini (quarterfinals)
6. (Slovakia) Dominik Hrbatý (finals)
7. (Morocco) Karim Alami (quarterfinals)
8. (Spain) Francisco Clavet (quarterfinals)

== Draw ==
=== Key ===
- Q = Qualifier
- WC = Wild card
- LL = Lucky loser
- Alt = Alternate
- SE = Special exempt
- PR = Protected ranking
- ITF = ITF entry
- JE = Junior exempt
- w/o = Walkover
- r = Retired
- d = Defaulted
- SR = Special ranking

=== Finals ===
Semifinals
1 WC	(Spain) Àlex Corretja	4	4
6	(Slovakia) Dominik Hrbatý	6	6
(Spain) Javier Sánchez	2	3
2	(Spain) Alberto Berasategui	6	6

Final
6	(Slovakia) Dominik Hrbatý	4	2
2	(Spain) Alberto Berasategui	6	6

=== Top half ===
First round
1 WC	(Spain) Àlex Corretja	5	6	6
WC	(Italy) Marzio Martelli	7	3	2
(Ecuador) Nicolás Lapentti	1	7^{7}	3
(Australia) Richard Fromberg	6	6^{3}	6
Q	(Italy) Massimo Valeri	6	4	0
(United States) Vincent Spadea	2	6	6
(Italy) Davide Sanguinetti	3	1
8	(Spain) Francisco Clavet	6	6
3	(Spain) Albert Portas	5	6	6
Q	(Germany) Marcello Craca	7	4	3
Q	(Italy) Filippo Messori	6	6
(Romania) Adrian Voinea	4	3
(Germany) Hendrik Dreekmann	3	6^{3}
(Argentina) Hernán Gumy	6	7^{7}
(Costa Rica) Juan Antonio Marín	4	3
6	(Slovakia) Dominik Hrbatý	6	6

Second round
1 WC	(Spain) Àlex Corretja	6	6
(Australia) Richard Fromberg	1	4
(United States) Vincent Spadea	3	3
8	(Spain) Francisco Clavet	6	6
3	(Spain) Albert Portas	6	6
Q	(Italy) Filippo Messori	1	3
(Argentina) Hernán Gumy	3	2^{r}
6	(Slovakia) Dominik Hrbatý	6	3

Quarterfinals
1 WC	(Spain) Àlex Corretja	7^{7}	6
8	(Spain) Francisco Clavet	6^{4}	2
3	(Spain) Albert Portas	5	4
6	(Slovakia) Dominik Hrbatý	7	6

Semifinals
1 WC	(Spain) Àlex Corretja	4	4
6	(Slovakia) Dominik Hrbatý	6	6

=== Bottom half ===
First round
5	(Uruguay) Marcelo Filippini	6	6
(Spain) Galo Blanco	1	2
(Spain) Emilio Benfele Álvarez	6^{7}	5
(Norway) Christian Ruud	7^{9}	7
(Austria) Gilbert Schaller	4	7^{7}	5
(Spain) Julián Alonso	6	6^{3}	7
(Spain) Javier Sánchez	7	6
4	(Morocco) Hicham Arazi	5	3
7	(Morocco) Karim Alami	6	2
SE	(Italy) Andrea Gaudenzi	3	0^{r}
WC	(Italy) Davide Scala	5	3
(Romania) Dinu Pescariu	7	6
(Spain) Carlos Costa	6	6
(Spain) Juan Albert Viloca-Puig	4	4
Q	(Spain) Fernando Vicente	4	7	4
2	(Spain) Alberto Berasategui	6	5	6

Second round
5	(Uruguay) Marcelo Filippini	7^{7}	6^{3}	7
(Norway) Christian Ruud	6^{4}	7^{7}	5
(Spain) Julián Alonso	4	4
(Spain) Javier Sánchez	6	6
7	(Morocco) Karim Alami	6	6
(Romania) Dinu Pescariu	4	3
(Spain) Carlos Costa	4	6	3
2	(Spain) Alberto Berasategui	6	4	6

Quarterfinals
5	(Uruguay) Marcelo Filippini	3	6	4
(Spain) Javier Sánchez	6	1	6
7	(Morocco) Karim Alami	6^{2}	2
2	(Spain) Alberto Berasategui	7^{7}	6

Semifinals
(Spain) Javier Sánchez	2	3
2	(Spain) Alberto Berasategui	6	6
