= 1995 Campionati Internazionali di Sicilia =

- Date: 25 September – 1 October
- Edition: 17th
- Category: World Series
- Draw: 32S / 16D
- Prize money: $303,000
- Surface: Clay / outdoor
- Location: Palermo, Italy

Champions

Singles
- (Spain) Francisco Clavet

Doubles
- (Spain) Àlex Corretja / (France) Fabrice Santoro
← 1994 ·	Campionati Internazionali di Sicilia	· 1996 →

The 1995 Campionati Internazionali di Sicilia was a men's tennis tournament played on outdoor clay courts in Palermo, Italy that was part of the World Series of the 1995 ATP Tour. It was the 17th edition of the tournament and took place from 25 September until 1 October 1995. Fifth-seeded Francisco Clavet won the singles title.

== Finals ==
=== Singles ===
(Spain) Francisco Clavet defeated (Spain) Jordi Burillo 6–7^{(2–7)}, 6–3, 7–6^{(7–1)}

- It was Clavet's 1st singles title of the year and the 2nd of his career.

=== Doubles ===
(Spain) Àlex Corretja / (France) Fabrice Santoro defeated (Netherlands) Hendrik Jan Davids / (South Africa) Piet Norval 6–7, 6–4, 6–3
