= 1994 Campionati Internazionali di Sicilia – Doubles =

Doubles
- 1994 Campionati Internazionali di Sicilia

Final
- Champions: (Netherlands) Tom Kempers (United States) Jack Waite
- Runners-up: (United Kingdom) Neil Broad (United States) Greg Van Emburgh
- Score: 7–6, 6–4

Details
- Draw: 16 (2WC/1Q)
- Seeds: 4

Events
Singles	Doubles
← 1993 ·	Campionati Internazionali di Sicilia	· 1995 →

Sergio Casal and Emilio Sánchez were the defending champions, but lost in the quarterfinals to Jordi Arrese and Wayne Arthurs.

Tom Kempers and Jack Waite won the title by defeating Neil Broad and Greg Van Emburgh 7–6, 6–4 in the final.

== Seeds ==
1. (Spain) Sergio Casal / (Spain) Emilio Sánchez (quarterfinals)
2. (Spain) Tomás Carbonell / (Spain) Javier Sánchez (quarterfinals)
3. (United States) Shelby Cannon / (South Africa) Byron Talbot (first round)
4. (Italy) Cristian Brandi / (Italy) Federico Mordegan (first round)

== Draw ==
=== Key ===
- Q = Qualifier
- WC = Wild card
- LL = Lucky loser
- Alt = Alternate
- ITF = ITF entry
- PR = Protected ranking
- SR = Special ranking
- SE = Special exempt
- JE = Junior exempt
- JR = Junior Accelerator Programme entrant
- CO = College Accelerator Programme entrant
- NG = Next Gen Accelerator Program entrant
- w/o = Walkover
- r = Retired
- d = Defaulted

=== Draw ===
First round
1	(Spain) S Casal (Spain) E Sánchez	6	6
(Argentina) L Lobo (Argentina) D Orsanic	3	2
(Spain) J Arrese (Australia) W Arthurs	6	6
(Spain) J Díaz (Spain) C Moyá	3	1
3	(United States) S Cannon (South Africa) B Talbot	5	6	4
(United Kingdom) N Broad (United States) G Van Emburgh	7	4	6
(United States) D Johnson (United States) M Keil	7	7
(South Africa) B Haygarth (South Africa) K Haygarth	5	5
(Slovakia) K Kučera (Belgium) L Pimek	7	6
Q	(Czech Republic) S Doseděl (United States) V Spadea	5	1
(Netherlands) T Kempers (United States) J Waite	6	7
4	(Italy) C Brandi (Italy) F Mordegan	3	6
WC	(Spain) A Berasategui (Spain) C Costa	7	6
(Czech Republic) V Flégl (Australia) J Ireland	6	3
WC	(Argentina) F Davín (Italy) R Furlan	7	6	4
2	(Spain) T Carbonell (Spain) J Sánchez	6	7	6

Quarterfinals
1	(Spain) S Casal (Spain) E Sánchez	2	4
(Spain) J Arrese (Australia) W Arthurs	6	6
(United Kingdom) N Broad (United States) G Van Emburgh	6	6
(United States) D Johnson (United States) M Keil	4	4
(Slovakia) K Kučera (Belgium) L Pimek	6	7	4
(Netherlands) T Kempers (United States) J Waite	7	5	6
WC	(Spain) A Berasategui (Spain) C Costa	4	6	6
2	(Spain) T Carbonell (Spain) J Sánchez	6	2	0

Semifinals
(Spain) J Arrese (Australia) W Arthurs	1	7	1
(United Kingdom) N Broad (United States) G Van Emburgh	6	6	6
(Netherlands) T Kempers (United States) J Waite	7	6
WC	(Spain) A Berasategui (Spain) C Costa	5	3

Final
(United Kingdom) N Broad (United States) G Van Emburgh	6	4
(Netherlands) T Kempers (United States) J Waite	7	6
