= 1995 Campionati Internazionali di Sicilia – Doubles =

Doubles
- 1995 Campionati Internazionali di Sicilia

Final
- Champions: (Spain) Àlex Corretja (France) Fabrice Santoro
- Runners-up: (Netherlands) Hendrik Jan Davids (South Africa) Piet Norval
- Score: 6–7, 6–4, 6–3

Details
- Draw: 16
- Seeds: 4

Events
| Singles | Doubles |
| ← 1994 · | Campionati Internazionali di Sicilia | · 1996 → |

Tom Kempers and Jack Waite were the defending champions, but Kempers did not compete this year. Waite teamed up with José Antonio Conde and lost in semifinals to tournament winners Àlex Corretja and Fabrice Santoro.

Àlex Corretja and Fabrice Santoro won the title by defeating Hendrik Jan Davids and Piet Norval 6–7, 6–4, 6–3 in the final.

== Seeds ==
1. (Argentina) Luis Lobo / (Spain) Javier Sánchez (first round)
2. (Spain) Tomás Carbonell / (Spain) Francisco Roig (first round)
3. (Netherlands) Hendrik Jan Davids / (South Africa) Piet Norval (final)
4. (Belgium) Libor Pimek / (South Africa) Byron Talbot (first round)

== Draw ==
=== Key ===
- Q = Qualifier
- WC = Wild card
- LL = Lucky loser
- Alt = Alternate
- ITF = ITF entry
- PR = Protected ranking
- SR = Special ranking
- SE = Special exempt
- JE = Junior exempt
- JR = Junior Accelerator Programme entrant
- CO = College Accelerator Programme entrant
- NG = Next Gen Accelerator Program entrant
- w/o = Walkover
- r = Retired
- d = Defaulted

=== Draw ===
First round
1 | (Argentina) L Lobo (Spain) J Sánchez | 4 | 4
Q | (Spain) À Corretja (France) F Santoro | 6 | 6
LL | (Italy) M Ardinghi (Italy) F Mordegan | 4 | 7 | 4
(South Africa) B Haygarth (United States) K Kinnear | 6 | 6 | 6
4 | (Belgium) L Pimek (South Africa) B Talbot | 6 | 3 | 5
WC | (Italy) C Brandi (Italy) P Canè | 3 | 6 | 7
(Spain) JA Conde (United States) J Waite | 6 | 7 | 6
WC | (France) H Leconte (Italy) D Nargiso | 7 | 6 | 2
WC | (Italy) G Galimberti (Armenia) S Sargsian | 7 | 3 | 4
(Italy) A Gaudenzi (Czech Republic) K Nováček | 6 | 6 | 6
(United States) D Randall (United States) G Van Emburgh | 6 | 4
3 | (Netherlands) HJ Davids (South Africa) P Norval | 7 | 6
(Austria) A Antonitsch (Netherlands) T Nijssen | 6 | 1
(Spain) J Arrese (Australia) W Arthurs | 7 | 6
(United States) B Behrens (United States) M Lucena | 6 | 6
2 | (Spain) T Carbonell (Spain) F Roig | 3 | 1

Quarterfinals
Q | (Spain) À Corretja (France) F Santoro | 6 | 7
(South Africa) B Haygarth (United States) K Kinnear | 1 | 5
WC | (Italy) C Brandi (Italy) P Canè | 2 | 7 | 4
(Spain) JA Conde (United States) J Waite | 6 | 5 | 6
(Italy) A Gaudenzi (Czech Republic) K Nováček
3 | (Netherlands) HJ Davids (South Africa) P Norval | w | / | o
(Spain) J Arrese (Australia) W Arthurs | 6 | 7
(United States) B Behrens (United States) M Lucena | 3 | 5

Semifinals
Q | (Spain) À Corretja (France) F Santoro | 6 | 7
(Spain) JA Conde (United States) J Waite | 2 | 5
3 | (Netherlands) HJ Davids (South Africa) P Norval | 4 | 7 | 6
(Spain) J Arrese (Australia) W Arthurs | 6 | 6 | 4

Final
Q | (Spain) À Corretja (France) F Santoro | 6 | 6 | 6
3 | (Netherlands) HJ Davids (South Africa) P Norval | 7 | 4 | 3
