= 1996 Campionati Internazionali di Sicilia =

- Date: 23–29 September
- Edition: 18th
- Category: World Series
- Draw: 32S / 16D
- Prize money: $303,000
- Surface: Clay / outdoor
- Location: Palermo, Italy

Champions

Singles
- (Morocco) Karim Alami

Doubles
- (Australia) Andrew Kratzmann / (South Africa) Marcos Ondruska
← 1995 ·	Campionati Internazionali di Sicilia	· 1997 →

The 1996 Campionati Internazionali di Sicilia was a men's tennis tournament played on outdoor clay courts in Palermo, Italy that was part of the World Series of the 1996 ATP Tour. It was the 18th edition of the tournament and took place from 23 September until 29 September 1996. Unseeded Karim Alami won the singles title.

== Finals ==
=== Singles ===
(Morocco) Karim Alami defeated (Romania) Adrian Voinea 7–5, 2–1 retired

- It was Alami's 2nd singles title of the year and the 2nd and last of his career.

=== Doubles ===
(Australia) Andrew Kratzmann / (South Africa) Marcos Ondruska defeated (Italy) Cristian Brandi / (Spain) Emilio Sánchez 7–6, 6–4

- It was Kratzmann's 1st title of the year and the 3rd of his career. It was Ondruska's 2nd title of the year and the 4th of his career.
