= 1997 Campionati Internazionali di Sicilia – Doubles =

Doubles
- 1997 Campionati Internazionali di Sicilia

Final
- Champions: (Australia) Andrew Kratzmann (Belgium) Libor Pimek
- Runners-up: (Netherlands) Hendrik Jan Davids (Argentina) Daniel Orsanic
- Score: 3–6, 6–3, 7–6

Details
- Draw: 16 (3WC/1Q)
- Seeds: 4

Events
| Singles | Doubles |
| ← 1996 · | Campionati Internazionali di Sicilia | · 1998 → |

Andrew Kratzmann and Marcos Ondruska were the defending champions, but Ondruska chose to compete at Beijing during the same week, losing there in the first round.

Kratzmann teamed up with Libor Pimek and successfully defended his title, by defeating Hendrik Jan Davids and Daniel Orsanic 3–6, 6–3, 7–6 in the final.

== Seeds ==
1. (Argentina) Luis Lobo / (Spain) Javier Sánchez (semifinals)
2. (Argentina) Pablo Albano / (Spain) Àlex Corretja (first round)
3. (Australia) Andrew Kratzmann / (Belgium) Libor Pimek (champions)
4. (Netherlands) Hendrik Jan Davids / (Argentina) Daniel Orsanic (final)

== Draw ==
=== Key ===
- Q = Qualifier
- WC = Wild card
- LL = Lucky loser
- Alt = Alternate
- ITF = ITF entry
- PR = Protected ranking
- SR = Special ranking
- SE = Special exempt
- JE = Junior exempt
- JR = Junior Accelerator Programme entrant
- CO = College Accelerator Programme entrant
- NG = Next Gen Accelerator Program entrant
- w/o = Walkover
- r = Retired
- d = Defaulted

=== Draw ===
First round
1 | (Argentina) L Lobo (Spain) J Sánchez | 4 | 6 | 6
WC | (Uruguay) M Filippini (Slovakia) D Hrbatý | 6 | 1 | 2
(Romania) D Pescariu (Italy) D Sanguinetti | 6 | 5
WC | (Morocco) K Alami (Morocco) H Arazi | 7 | 7
3 | (Australia) A Kratzmann (Belgium) L Pimek | 3 | 6 | 7
(Spain) J Alonso (Spain) E Sánchez | 6 | 3 | 6
(United States) V Spadea (Czech Republic) T Anzari | 3 | 6 | 1
WC | (Italy) M Martelli (Italy) M Valeri | 6 | 3 | 6
(United States) B Coupe (South Africa) P Rosner | 6 | 6
(Italy) C Brandi (Italy) F Messori | 2 | 2
(South Africa) B Haygarth (United States) K Kinnear | 6 | 2
4 | (Netherlands) HJ Davids (Argentina) D Orsanic | 7 | 6
(Mexico) D Roditi (Belgium) T Vanhoudt | 6 | 6
Q | (Spain) C Costa (Spain) A Portas | 2 | 4
(Spain) A Berasategui (Spain) J Burillo | 6 | 6
2 | (Argentina) P Albano (Spain) À Corretja | 3 | 3

Quarterfinals
1 | (Argentina) L Lobo (Spain) J Sánchez | 6 | 6
WC | (Morocco) K Alami (Morocco) H Arazi | 3 | 0
3 | (Australia) A Kratzmann (Belgium) L Pimek | 6 | 6
WC | (Italy) M Martelli (Italy) M Valeri | 3 | 4
(United States) B Coupe (South Africa) P Rosner | 6 | 3 | 1
4 | (Netherlands) HJ Davids (Argentina) D Orsanic | 1 | 6 | 6
(Mexico) D Roditi (Belgium) T Vanhoudt | 7 | 6 | 6
(Spain) A Berasategui (Spain) J Burillo | 6 | 7 | 7

Semifinals
1 | (Argentina) L Lobo (Spain) J Sánchez | 3 | 4
3 | (Australia) A Kratzmann (Belgium) L Pimek | 6 | 6
4 | (Netherlands) HJ Davids (Argentina) D Orsanic | 6 | 6
(Spain) A Berasategui (Spain) J Burillo | 4 | 3

Final
3 | (Australia) A Kratzmann (Belgium) L Pimek | 3 | 6 | 7
4 | (Netherlands) HJ Davids (Argentina) D Orsanic | 6 | 3 | 6
