= 1996 Campionati Internazionali di Sicilia – Doubles =

Doubles
- 1996 Campionati Internazionali di Sicilia
- 1995 Champions: (Spain) Àlex Corretja (France) Fabrice Santoro

Final
- Champions: (Australia) Andrew Kratzmann (South Africa) Marcos Ondruska
- Runners-up: (Italy) Cristian Brandi (Spain) Emilio Sánchez
- Score: 7–6, 6–4

Details
- Draw: 16
- Seeds: 4

Events
Singles	Doubles
← 1995 ·	Campionati Internazionali di Sicilia	· 1997 →

Àlex Corretja and Fabrice Santoro were the defending champions but only Corretja competed that year with Jose Antonio Conde.

Conde and Corretja lost in the quarterfinals to Cristian Brandi and Emilio Sánchez.

Andrew Kratzmann and Marcos Ondruska won in the final 7–6, 6–4 against Brandi and Sánchez.

== Seeds ==
Champion seeds are indicated in bold text while text in italics indicates the round in which those seeds were eliminated.

1. (Argentina) Luis Lobo / (Spain) Javier Sánchez (quarterfinals)
2. (United States) Donald Johnson / (United States) Francisco Montana (quarterfinals)
3. (Netherlands) Hendrik Jan Davids / (Netherlands) Stephen Noteboom (first round)
4. (Italy) Cristian Brandi / (Spain) Emilio Sánchez (final)

== Draw ==
=== Key ===
- Q = Qualifier
- WC = Wild card
- LL = Lucky loser
- Alt = Alternate
- SE = Special exempt
- PR = Protected ranking
- ITF = ITF entry
- JE = Junior exempt
- w/o = Walkover
- r = Retired
- d = Defaulted
- SR = Special ranking

First round
1	(Argentina) **L Lobo** (Spain) **J Sánchez**	**6**	**7**
WC	(Spain) J Burillo (Italy) O Camporese	2	5
(Australia) **A Kratzmann** (South Africa) **M Ondruska**	**6**	**6**
WC	(Italy) F Luzzi (Italy) D Sciortino	2	1
3	(Netherlands) H J Davids (Netherlands) S Noteboom	**6**	6	2
Q	(Italy) **M Martelli** (Italy) **D Sanguinetti**	3	**7**	**6**
(Argentina) **P Albano** (Argentina) **L Arnold**	6	**6**	**3**
(Morocco) K Alami (Hungary) G Köves	**7**	2	0/r
(Spain) **J A Conde** (Spain) **À Corretja**	**7**	3	**6**
(South Africa) B Haygarth (United States) G Van Emburgh	6	**6**	3
(Italy) F Mordegan (Italy) D Nargiso	5	0	r
4	(Italy) **C Brandi** (Spain) **E Sánchez**	**7**	**1**
(Sweden) **R Bergh** (United States) **J Waite**	**7**	**6**
WC	(Spain) F Clavet (Spain) A Costa	5	1
(Latvia) Ģ Dzelde (Austria) U Plamberger	3	4
2	(United States) **D Johnson** (United States) **F Montana**	**6**	**6**

Quarterfinals
1	(Argentina) L Lobo (Spain) J Sánchez	**6**	1	6
(Australia) **A Kratzmann** (South Africa) **M Ondruska**	3	**6**	**7**
Q	(Italy) M Martelli (Italy) D Sanguinetti	3	2
(Argentina) **P Albano** (Argentina) **L Arnold**	**6**	**6**
(Spain) J A Conde (Spain) À Corretja	5	4
4	(Italy) **C Brandi** (Spain) **E Sánchez**	**7**	**6**
(Sweden) **R Bergh** (United States) **J Waite**	4	**7**	**6**
2	(United States) D Johnson (United States) F Montana	**6**	6	3

Semifinals
(Australia) **A Kratzmann** (South Africa) **M Ondruska**	**6**	**6**
(Argentina) P Albano (Argentina) L Arnold	3	2
4	(Italy) **C Brandi** (Spain) **E Sánchez**	**7**	0	**7**
(Sweden) R Bergh (United States) J Waite	5	**6**	6

Final
(Australia) **Andrew Kratzmann** (South Africa) **Marcos Ondruska**	**7**	**6**
4	(Italy) Cristian Brandi (Spain) Emilio Sánchez	6	4
