= 1996 French Open =

- Date: 27 May – 9 June 1996
- Edition: 95
- Category: 66th Grand Slam (ITF)
- Surface: Clay
- Location: Paris (XVI^{e}), France
- Venue: Stade Roland Garros

Champions

Men's singles
- (Russia) Yevgeny Kafelnikov

Women's singles
- (Germany) Steffi Graf

Men's doubles
- (Russia) Yevgeny Kafelnikov / (Czech Republic) Daniel Vacek

Women's doubles
- (United States) Lindsay Davenport / (United States) Mary Joe Fernández

Mixed doubles
- (Argentina) Patricia Tarabini / (Argentina) Javier Frana
← 1995 ·	French Open	· 1997 →

The 1996 French Open was a tennis tournament that took place on the outdoor clay courts at the Stade Roland Garros in Paris, France. The tournament was held from 27 May until 9 June. It was the 95th staging of the French Open, and the second Grand Slam tennis event of 1996.

== Seniors ==
=== Men's singles ===
(Russia) Yevgeny Kafelnikov defeated (Germany) Michael Stich, 7–6^{(7–4)}, 7–5, 7–6^{(7–4)}

- It was Kafelnikov's 3rd title of the year, and his 10th overall. It was his 1st career Grand Slam title.

=== Women's singles ===
(Germany) Steffi Graf defeated (Spain) Arantxa Sánchez Vicario, 6–3, 6–7^{(4–7)}, 10–8

- It was Graf's 4th title of the year, and her 99th overall. It was her 19th career Grand Slam title, and her 5th French Open title.

=== Men's doubles ===
(Russia) Yevgeny Kafelnikov / (Czech Republic) Daniel Vacek defeated (France) Guy Forget / (Switzerland) Jakob Hlasek, 6–2, 6–3

=== Women's doubles ===
(United States) Lindsay Davenport / (United States) Mary Joe Fernández defeated (United States) Gigi Fernández / (Belarus) Natasha Zvereva, 6–2, 6–1

=== Mixed doubles ===
(Argentina) Patricia Tarabini / (Argentina) Javier Frana defeated (United States) Nicole Arendt / (United States) Luke Jensen, 6–2, 6–2

== Juniors ==
=== Boys' singles ===
(Spain) Alberto Martín (ESP) defeated (Sweden) Björn Rehnquist (SWE), 6–3, 7–6

=== Girls' singles ===
(France) Amélie Mauresmo (FRA) defeated (United States) Meghann Shaughnessy (USA), 6–0, 6–4

=== Boys' doubles ===
(France) Sébastien Grosjean / (France) Olivier Mutis (FRA) defeated (Germany) Jan-Ralph Brandt / (Germany) Daniel Elsner (GER), 6–2, 6–3

=== Girls' doubles ===
(Italy) Alice Canepa / (Italy) Giulia Casoni (ITA) defeated (Russia) Anna Kournikova (RUS) / (Czech Republic) Ludmila Varmužová (CZE), 6–2, 5–7, 7–5

Preceded by 1996 Australian Open	Grand Slams	Succeeded by 1996 Wimbledon Championships
