= 1994 Campionati Internazionali di Sicilia – Singles =

Singles
- 1994 Campionati Internazionali di Sicilia

Final
- Champion: (Spain) Alberto Berasategui
- Runner-up: (Spain) Àlex Corretja
- Score: 2–6, 7–6^{(8–6)}, 6–4

Details
- Draw: 32 (3WC/4Q/1LL)
- Seeds: 8

Events
Singles	Doubles
← 1993 ·	Campionati Internazionali di Sicilia	· 1995 →

Thomas Muster was the defending champion, but lost in the second round to Emilio Sánchez.

Alberto Berasategui won the title by defeating Àlex Corretja 2–6, 7–6^{(8–6)}, 6–4 in the final.

== Seeds ==
1. (Spain) Alberto Berasategui (champion)
2. (Austria) Thomas Muster (second round)
3. (Spain) Carlos Costa (second round)
4. (Italy) Andrea Gaudenzi (first round)
5. (Czech Republic) Sláva Doseděl (semifinals)
6. (Spain) Àlex Corretja (final)
7. (Spain) Javier Sánchez (first round)
8. (Austria) Gilbert Schaller (quarterfinals)

== Draw ==
=== Key ===
- Q = Qualifier
- WC = Wild card
- LL = Lucky loser
- Alt = Alternate
- ITF = ITF entry
- PR = Protected ranking
- SR = Special ranking
- SE = Special exempt
- JE = Junior exempt
- JR = Junior Accelerator Programme entrant
- CO = College Accelerator Programme entrant
- NG = Next Gen Accelerator Program entrant
- w/o = Walkover
- r = Retired
- d = Defaulted

=== Finals ===
Semifinals
1	(Spain) Alberto Berasategui	6	7
5	(Czech Republic) Sláva Doseděl	4	5
6	(Spain) Àlex Corretja	6^{5}	6	6
(Spain) Emilio Sánchez	7^{7}	4	3

Final
1	(Spain) Alberto Berasategui	2	7^{8}	6
6	(Spain) Àlex Corretja	6	6^{6}	4

=== Top half ===
First round
1	(Spain) A Berasategui	7^{7}	6
WC	(Italy) P Canè	6^{4}	3
(Germany) H Dreekmann	6	6
LL	(France) G Solvès	4	2
(Germany) O Gross	6^{1}	6	6
Q	(Spain) JA Viloca	7^{7}	3	4
Q	(United States) V Spadea	7	7
7	(Spain) J Sánchez	5	5
4	(Italy) A Gaudenzi	2	6	4
(Spain) F Clavet	6	0	6
WC	(Chile) M Ríos	1	6	4
(Argentina) F Davín	6	4	6
(Spain) Ó Martínez	6	6
(Russia) A Cherkasov	3	4
(Italy) D Nargiso	4	3
5	(Czech Republic) S Doseděl	6	6

Second round
1	(Spain) A Berasategui	6	6
(Germany) H Dreekmann	2	2
(Germany) O Gross	5	7^{7}	6
Q	(United States) V Spadea	7	6^{5}	3
(Spain) F Clavet	5	6	7^{10}
(Argentina) F Davín	7	2	6^{8}
(Spain) Ó Martínez	6	6^{7}	4
5	(Czech Republic) S Doseděl	2	7^{9}	6

Quarterfinals
1	(Spain) A Berasategui	6	6
(Germany) O Gross	2	1
(Spain) F Clavet	0	7	1
5	(Czech Republic) S Doseděl	6	5	6

Semifinals
1	(Spain) A Berasategui	6	7
5	(Czech Republic) S Doseděl	4	5

=== Bottom half ===
First round
6	(Spain) À Corretja	6	6^{6}	6
Q	(United States) D Johnson	4	7^{8}	3
(Spain) A Costa	6^{7}	7	3
(Spain) J Burillo	7^{9}	5	6
(Spain) J Arrese	6	6
Q	(Spain) R Carretero	2	2
(Spain) T Carbonell	1	4
3	(Spain) C Costa	6	6
8	(Austria) G Schaller	6^{5}	6	6
(Italy) R Furlan	7^{7}	2	4
WC	(Romania) R Sabău	6	6
(Morocco) K Alami	4	1
(Spain) E Sánchez	3	6	4
(Argentina) G Markus	6	2	1^{r}
(Slovakia) K Kučera	2	1
2	(Austria) T Muster	6	6

Second round
6	(Spain) À Corretja	6	6
(Spain) J Burillo	2	4
(Spain) J Arrese	6	4	7^{7}
3	(Spain) C Costa	4	6	6^{3}
8	(Austria) G Schaller	6	6
WC	(Romania) R Sabău	3	4
(Spain) E Sánchez	6	7
2	(Austria) T Muster	3	5

Quarterfinals
6	(Spain) À Corretja	6	6
(Spain) J Arrese	3	4
8	(Austria) G Schaller	5	3
(Spain) E Sánchez	7	6

Semifinals
6	(Spain) À Corretja	6^{5}	6	6
(Spain) E Sánchez	7^{7}	4	3
