= 1997 Campionati Internazionali di Sicilia =

Men's tennis tournament in Italy

- Date: 29 September – 5 October
- Edition: 18th
- Category: World Series
- Draw: 32S / 16D
- Prize money: $303,000
- Surface: Clay / outdoor
- Location: Palermo, Italy

Champions

Singles
- (Spain) Alberto Berasategui

Doubles
- (Australia) Andrew Kratzmann (Belgium) Libor Pimek
← 1996 ·	Campionati Internazionali di Sicilia	· 1998 →

The 1997 Campionati Internazionali di Sicilia was a men's tennis tournament played on outdoor clay courts in Palermo, Italy that was part of the World Series of the 1997 ATP Tour. It was the 18th edition of the tournament and was held from 29 September until 5 October 1997. Second-seeded Alberto Berasategui won the singles title.

== Finals ==
=== Singles ===
(Spain) Alberto Berasategui defeated (Slovakia) Dominik Hrbatý, 6–4, 6–2

- It was Berasategui's 1st singles title of the year and the 13th of his career.

=== Doubles ===
(Australia) Andrew Kratzmann / (Belgium) Libor Pimek defeated (Netherlands) Hendrik Jan Davids / (Argentina) Daniel Orsanic, 3–6, 6–3, 7–6
