= 1996 Campionati Internazionali di Sicilia – Singles =

Singles
- 1996 Campionati Internazionali di Sicilia

Final
- Champion: (Morocco) Karim Alami
- Runner-up: (Romania) Adrian Voinea
- Score: 7–5, 2–1 (Voinea retired)

Details
- Draw: 32
- Seeds: 8

Events
Singles	Doubles
← 1995 ·	Campionati Internazionali di Sicilia	· 1997 →

Francisco Clavet was the defending champion but lost in the quarterfinals to Karim Alami.

Alami won the final 7–5, 2–1 after Adrian Voinea was forced to retire.

== Seeds ==
A champion seed is indicated in bold text while text in italics indicates the round in which that seed was eliminated.

1. (Spain) Félix Mantilla (second round)
2. (Spain) Alberto Berasategui (second round)
3. (Spain) Carlos Moyá (second round)
4. (Spain) Àlex Corretja (quarterfinals)
5. (Spain) Francisco Clavet (quarterfinals)
6. (Spain) Javier Sánchez (first round)
7. (Argentina) Hernán Gumy (second round)
8. (Spain) Jordi Burillo (quarterfinals)

== Draw ==
=== Key ===
- Q = Qualifier
- WC = Wild card
- LL = Lucky loser
- Alt = Alternate
- ITF = ITF entry
- PR = Protected ranking
- SR = Special ranking
- SE = Special exempt
- JE = Junior exempt
- JR = Junior Accelerator Programme entrant
- CO = College Accelerator Programme entrant
- NG = Next Gen Accelerator Program entrant
- w/o = Walkover
- r = Retired
- d = Defaulted

First round
1	(Spain) **F Mantilla**	**7^{7}**	**6**
(Germany) B Karbacher	6^{4}	4
(Spain) G Blanco	5	3
(Belgium) **J Van Herck**	**7**	**6**
(France) J Golmard	**6**	3	3
(Morocco) **H Arazi**	3	**6**	**6**
(Spain) I Truyol	1	2
7	(Argentina) **H Gumy**	**6**	**6**
4	(Spain) **À Corretja**	2	**6**	**6**
Q	(Netherlands) H J Davids	**6**	2	2
(Spain) **C Costa**	4	**6**	**6**
WC	(Spain) E Sánchez	**6**	4	4
(Spain) R Carretero	4	**7^{8}**	6^{9}
WC	(Italy) **D Nargiso**	**6**	6^{6}	**7^{11}**
(Romania) **A Voinea**	**6**	**7^{7}**
6	(Spain) J Sánchez	2	6^{1}
5	(Spain) **F Clavet**	**6**	**7^{7}**
(Argentina) G Pérez Roldán	4	6^{5}
(Brazil) **F Meligeni**	**6**	**6**
Q	(Argentina) M Zabaleta	2	2
(Morocco) **K Alami**	**6**	**6**
WC	(Italy) O Camporese	3	1
(Australia) R Fromberg	3	6^{7}
3	(Spain) **C Moyá**	**6**	**7^{9}**
8	(Spain) **J Burillo**	**6**	**6**
(Spain) T Carbonell	3	3
(South Africa) M Ondruska	**6**	1	2
(Uruguay) **M Filippini**	1	**6**	**6**
Q	(Italy) **M Martelli**	**7^{7}**	**6**
Q	(France) C Auffray	6^{1}	3
(Belgium) K Goossens	5	r
2	(Spain) **A Berasategui**	**3**

Second round
1	(Spain) F Mantilla	6^{2}	3
(Belgium) **J Van Herck**	**7^{7}**	**6**
(Morocco) **H Arazi**	**6**	**6**
7	(Argentina) H Gumy	4	4
4	(Spain) **À Corretja**	4	**6**	**6**
(Spain) C Costa	**6**	4	1
WC	(Italy) D Nargiso	4	4
(Romania) **A Voinea**	**6**	**6**
5	(Spain) **F Clavet**	4	**7^{7}**	**6**
(Brazil) F Meligeni	**6**	6^{5}	3
(Morocco) **K Alami**	**6**	**6**
3	(Spain) C Moyá	2	3
8	(Spain) **J Burillo**	**7**	2	**6**
(Uruguay) M Filippini	5	**6**	2
Q	(Italy) **M Martelli**	**7**	**6**
2	(Spain) A Berasategui	5	2

Quarterfinals
(Belgium) **J Van Herck**	**6**	**6**
(Morocco) H Arazi	4	4
4	(Spain) À Corretja	4	2
(Romania) **A Voinea**	**6**	**6**
5	(Spain) F Clavet	2	4
(Morocco) **K Alami**	**6**	**6**
8	(Spain) J Burillo	3	2
Q	(Italy) **M Martelli**	**6**	**6**

Semifinals
(Belgium) J Van Herck	3	2
(Romania) **A Voinea**	**6**	**6**
(Morocco) **K Alami**	**6**	1	**6**
Q	(Italy) M Martelli	3	**6**	2

Final
(Romania) Adrian Voinea	5	1	r
(Morocco) **Karim Alami**	**7**	**2**
