= 1996 French Open – Women's singles =

Women's singles
- 1996 French Open

Final
- Champion: (Germany) Steffi Graf
- Runner-up: (Spain) Arantxa Sánchez Vicario
- Score: 6–3, 6–7^{(4–7)}, 10–8

Details
- Draw: 128
- Seeds: 16

Events
Singles	men	women		boys	girls
Doubles	men	women	mixed	boys	girls
WC Singles	men	women	quad
WC Doubles	men	women	quad
Legends	−45	45+	women
← 1995 ·	French Open	· 1997 →

Defending champion Steffi Graf defeated Arantxa Sánchez Vicario in a rematch of the previous year's final, 6–3, 6–7^{(4–7)}, 10–8 to win the women's singles tennis title at the 1996 French Open. It was her fifth French Open singles title and record 19th major women's singles title, surpassing Chris Evert and Martina Navratilova's joint Open Era record.

== Seeds ==
The seeded players are listed below. Steffi Graf is the champion; others show the round in which they were eliminated.

1. (Germany) Steffi Graf (champion)
2. (United States) Monica Seles (quarterfinals)
3. (Spain) Conchita Martínez (semifinals)
4. (Spain) Arantxa Sánchez Vicario (final)
5. (Croatia) Iva Majoli (quarterfinals)
6. (Germany) Anke Huber (fourth round)
7. (Japan) Kimiko Date (fourth round)
8. (Netherlands) Brenda Schultz-McCarthy (third round)
9. (United States) Lindsay Davenport (quarterfinals)
10. (Czech Republic) Jana Novotná (semifinals)
11. (United States) Mary Joe Fernández (fourth round)
12. (France) Mary Pierce (third round)
13. (Bulgaria) Magdalena Maleeva (fourth round)
14. (South Africa) Amanda Coetzer (fourth round)
15. (Switzerland) Martina Hingis (third round)
16. (Austria) Barbara Paulus (third round)

== Draw ==
=== Key ===
- Q = Qualifier
- WC = Wild card
- LL = Lucky loser
- Alt = Alternate
- ITF = ITF entry
- PR = Protected ranking
- SR = Special ranking
- SE = Special exempt
- JE = Junior exempt
- JR = Junior Accelerator Programme entrant
- CO = College Accelerator Programme entrant
- NG = Next Gen Accelerator Program entrant
- w/o = Walkover
- r = Retired
- d = Defaulted

=== Finals ===
Quarterfinals
1	(Germany) Steffi Graf	6	6
5	(Croatia) Iva Majoli	3	1
3	(Spain) Conchita Martínez	6	6
9	(United States) Lindsay Davenport	1	3
(Slovakia) Karina Habšudová	2	7^{7}	8
4	(Spain) Arantxa Sánchez Vicario	6	6^{4}	10
10	(Czech Republic) Jana Novotná	7^{9}	6
2	(United States) Monica Seles	6^{7}	3

Semifinals
1	(Germany) Steffi Graf	6	6
3	(Spain) Conchita Martínez	3	1
4	(Spain) Arantxa Sánchez Vicario	6	7
10	(Czech Republic) Jana Novotná	3	5

Finals
1	(Germany) Steffi Graf	6	6^{4}	10
4	(Spain) Arantxa Sánchez Vicario	3	7^{7}	8

=== Earlier rounds ===
==== Section 1 ====
First round
1	(Germany) S Graf	6	6
(Latvia) L Neiland	3	2
(Australia) N Bradtke	6	6
(United States) J Watanabe	2	3
(Netherlands) P Kamstra	6	7
(Italy) L Golarsa	1	5
Q	(Czech Republic) P Langrová	6	7^{14}
(United States) N Arendt	2	6^{12}
(France) J Halard-Decugis	2	6	6
(United States) L Lee	6	1	0
LL	(Italy) G Pizzichini	7^{7}	6
(Germany) K Kschwendt	6^{2}	2
(Slovakia) H Nagyová	2	6	6
(Switzerland) P Schnyder	6	4	4
11	(United States) MJ Fernández	6	6
(Poland) M Grzybowska	0	1

Second round
1	(Germany) S Graf	6	6
(Australia) N Bradtke	2	2
(Netherlands) P Kamstra	2	6	1
Q	(Czech Republic) P Langrová	6	4	6
(France) J Halard-Decugis	7^{7}	4	5
LL	(Italy) G Pizzichini	6^{4}	6	7
(Slovakia) H Nagyová	2	4
11	(United States) MJ Fernández	6	6

Third round
1	(Germany) S Graf	6	1
Q	(Czech Republic) P Langrová	0	0	r
LL	(Italy) G Pizzichini	2	3
11	(United States) MJ Fernández	6	6

Fourth round
1	(Germany) S Graf	6	7^{9}
11	(United States) MJ Fernández	1	6^{7}

==== Section 2 ====
First round
16	(Austria) B Paulus	6	6
(Japan) N Kijimuta	4	4
(Netherlands) K Boogert	6	6
Q	(Spain) Á Montolio	1	4
(Japan) K Nagatsuka	6	3	6
(United States) K Adams	4	6	2
Q	(Spain) G León García	6	6
(Japan) N Miyagi	4	4
(Argentina) P Suárez	1	6	6
(South Africa) M de Swardt	6	3	2
(France) S Testud	6	5	6
(Spain) V Ruano Pascual	3	7	4
(Italy) R Grande	6	6
(United States) S Cacic	3	1
5	(Croatia) I Majoli	6	6
(Germany) S Meier	3	4

Second round
16	(Austria) B Paulus	6	6
(Netherlands) K Boogert	2	4
(Japan) K Nagatsuka	1	0
Q	(Spain) G León García	6	6
(Argentina) P Suárez	5	3
(France) S Testud	7	6
(Italy) R Grande	3	6^{4}
5	(Croatia) I Majoli	6	7^{7}

Third round
16	(Austria) B Paulus	4	6	3
Q	(Spain) G León García	6	2	6
(France) S Testud	6	5	4
5	(Croatia) I Majoli	4	7	6

Fourth round
Q	(Spain) G León García	3	1
5	(Croatia) I Majoli	6	6

==== Section 3 ====
First round
3	(Spain) C Martínez	6	6
(Belgium) E Callens	1	1
(Slovakia) R Zrubáková	5	6	6
WC	(France) A-G Sidot	7	3	2
(United States) A Grossman	6	6
(Japan) Y Kamio	4	0
(France) N Dechy	6	7
(Slovakia) J Husárová	2	5
(Italy) A Serra Zanetti	2	6	7
(Argentina) F Labat	6	1	5
(Belarus) N Zvereva	6	6
(Belgium) D Van Roost	3	4
Q	(Italy) F Lubiani	6	7
(Germany) C Porwik	4	5
14	(South Africa) A Coetzer	6	7
(Japan) A Sugiyama	1	5

Second round
3	(Spain) C Martínez	6	7
(Slovakia) R Zrubáková	3	5
(United States) A Grossman	6	6
(France) N Dechy	3	3
(Italy) A Serra Zanetti	3	3
(Belarus) N Zvereva	6	6
Q	(Italy) F Lubiani	4	1
14	(South Africa) A Coetzer	6	6

Third round
3	(Spain) C Martínez	6	6
(United States) A Grossman	2	1
(Belarus) N Zvereva	3	6	2
14	(South Africa) A Coetzer	6	3	6

Fourth round
3	(Spain) C Martínez	6	6
14	(South Africa) A Coetzer	2	3

==== Section 4 ====
First round
9	(United States) L Davenport	6	6
Q	(Italy) F Perfetti	4	1
(South Korea) S-h Park	5	6	6
(Japan) M Endo	7	1	3
(Indonesia) Y Basuki	6	6
(United States) M Werdel-Witmeyer	4	2
(Belgium) L Courtois	6	5
(Argentina) MJ Gaidano	3	2	r
(United States) L Wild	6	6
(Japan) R Hiraki	2	0
Q	(Italy) S Cecchini	6	6
(United States) M McGrath	2	1
(Federal Republic of Yugoslavia) T Ječmenica	7	7^{7}
(Germany) S Hack	5	6^{0}
7	(Japan) K Date	3	6	6
(Sweden) Å Carlsson	6	3	4

Second round
9	(United States) L Davenport	6	6
(South Korea) S-h Park	1	2
(Indonesia) Y Basuki	7	6
(Belgium) L Courtois	5	2
(United States) L Wild	6^{5}	7^{7}	6
Q	(Italy) S Cecchini	7^{7}	6^{3}	2
(Federal Republic of Yugoslavia) T Ječmenica	4	2
7	(Japan) K Date	6	6

Third round
9	(United States) L Davenport	6	6
(Indonesia) Y Basuki	3	2
(United States) L Wild	3	5
7	(Japan) K Date	6	7

Fourth round
9	(United States) L Davenport	3	6	8
7	(Japan) K Date	6	4	6

==== Section 5 ====
First round
6	(Germany) A Huber	6	6
(United States) G Fernández	2	2
(Hungary) A Temesvári	6	7
(United States) S Stafford	1	5
(Belgium) N Feber	6	6
(Czech Republic) H Suková	4	4
WC	(France) S Pitkowski	6	5	7
Q	(Australia) R McQuillan	4	7	5
(Slovakia) K Habšudová	6^{5}	6	7
(Australia) K Godridge	7^{7}	0	5
(France) N Tauziat	6	6
(United States) A Miller	1	1
(Germany) P Begerow	2	7	6
(Germany) C Singer	6	5	4
15	(Switzerland) M Hingis	6	6
(Austria) B Schett	3	0

Second round
6	(Germany) A Huber	6	6
(Hungary) A Temesvári	3	2
(Belgium) N Feber	2	5
WC	(France) S Pitkowski	6	7
(Slovakia) K Habšudová	6	4	8
(France) N Tauziat	2	6	6
(Germany) P Begerow	5	5
15	(Switzerland) M Hingis	7	7

Third round
6	(Germany) A Huber	6	6
WC	(France) S Pitkowski	2	2
(Slovakia) K Habšudová	4	7	6
15	(Switzerland) M Hingis	6	5	4

Fourth round
6	(Germany) A Huber	5	3
(Slovakia) K Habšudová	7	6

==== Section 6 ====
First round
12	(France) M Pierce	7	6
LL	(Austria) M Schnell	5	2
LL	(Madagascar) D Randriantefy	7^{8}	6
Q	(Canada) J Nejedly	6^{6}	1
(Germany) B Rittner	6	6
(Slovakia) K Studeníková	0	1
(China) J-Q Yi	6	7
(United States) J Capriati	3	5
(Spain) M Sánchez Lorenzo	6	6
WC	(France) A Cocheteux	2	2
(Russia) E Likhovtseva	6	1	6
(Austria) J Wiesner	3	6	4
(Germany) V Martinek	6	6
(Germany) J Kandarr	3	4
4	(Spain) A Sánchez Vicario	6	6
(Germany) A Glass	2	3

Second round
12	(France) M Pierce	6	2	6
LL	(Madagascar) D Randriantefy	3	6	2
(Germany) B Rittner	6	6
(China) J-Q Yi	0	3
(Spain) M Sánchez Lorenzo	3	6	7
(Russia) E Likhovtseva	6	3	9
(Germany) V Martinek	0	1
4	(Spain) A Sánchez Vicario	6	6

Third round
12	(France) M Pierce	4	2
(Germany) B Rittner	6	6
(Russia) E Likhovtseva	0	0
4	(Spain) A Sánchez Vicario	6	6

Fourth round
(Germany) B Rittner	3	4
4	(Spain) A Sánchez Vicario	6	6

==== Section 7 ====
First round
8	(Netherlands) B Schultz-McCarthy	6	6
(France) A Dechaume-Balleret	4	4
WC	(France) A Mauresmo	6	1	6
(Austria) B Reinstadler	2	6	4
(Italy) S Farina	6	6
(Romania) C Cristea	3	4
(Romania) I Spîrlea	6	6
WC	(France) C Mothes-Jobkel	0	1
(Russia) E Makarova	6	3	6
(Italy) N Baudone	0	6	1
(France) A Fusai	6	6
(Canada) P Hy-Boulais	2	4
(Chinese Taipei) S-T Wang	6	6
(Israel) A Smashnova	2	4
10	(Czech Republic) J Novotná	6	6
(Czech Republic) L Richterová	0	2

Second round
8	(Netherlands) B Schultz-McCarthy	6	5	7
WC	(France) A Mauresmo	4	7	5
(Italy) S Farina	0	r
(Romania) I Spîrlea	4
(Russia) E Makarova	6	6
(France) A Fusai	1	1
(Chinese Taipei) S-T Wang	4	3
10	(Czech Republic) J Novotná	6	6

Third round
8	(Netherlands) B Schultz-McCarthy	3	6	2
(Romania) I Spîrlea	6	3	6
(Russia) E Makarova	1	5
10	(Czech Republic) J Novotná	6	7

Fourth round
(Romania) I Spîrlea	1	5
10	(Czech Republic) J Novotná	6	7

==== Section 8 ====
First round
13	(Bulgaria) M Maleeva	6	6^{4}	12
(United States) L Raymond	1	7^{7}	10
(United States) T Whitlinger-Jones	6	6
(Bulgaria) E Pampoulova	1	2
(Netherlands) M Oremans	6	6
WC	(France) L Ghirardi-Rubbi	3	0
(Czech Republic) R Bobková	6	7
WC	(France) I Demongeot	2	5
(Romania) R Dragomir	6	6
(United States) A Frazier	3	3
(Belgium) S Appelmans	6	6
(Australia) R Stubbs	1	1
(Japan) N Sawamatsu	6	6
(Poland) K Nowak	2	1
2	(United States) M Seles	6	6
WC	(France) C Dhenin	1	1

Second round
13	(Bulgaria) M Maleeva	6	2	6
(United States) T Whitlinger-Jones	2	6	2
(Netherlands) M Oremans	7	6
(Czech Republic) R Bobková	5	1
(Romania) R Dragomir	2	2
(Belgium) S Appelmans	6	6
(Japan) N Sawamatsu	6^{4}	2
2	(United States) M Seles	7^{7}	6

Third round
13	(Bulgaria) M Maleeva	6	6
(Netherlands) M Oremans	2	1
(Belgium) S Appelmans	2	5
2	(United States) M Seles	6	7

Fourth round
13	(Bulgaria) M Maleeva	1	1
2	(United States) M Seles	6	6

Preceded by 1996 Australian Open – Women's singles	Grand Slam women's singles	Succeeded by 1996 Wimbledon Championships – Women's singles
