= Johan Van Herck =

Belgian tennis coach and player

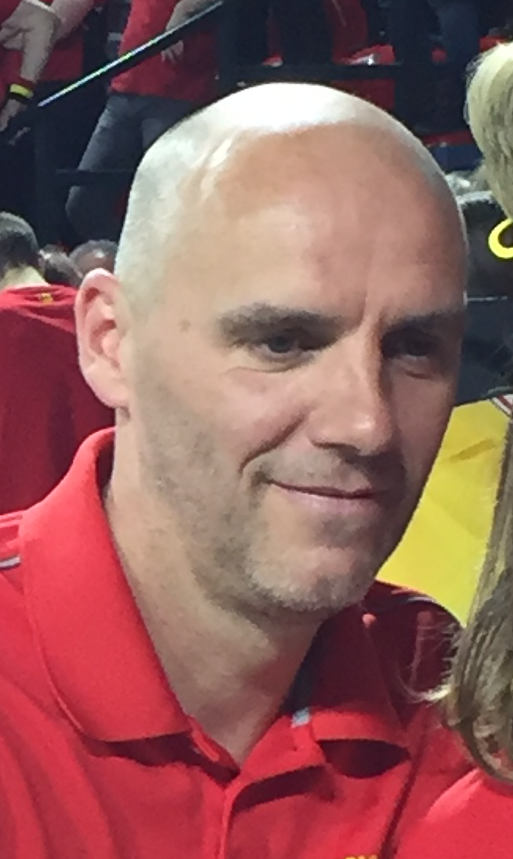
- Johan Van Herck at the 2017 Davis Cup Quarterfinals
- Country (sports): Belgium
- Born: 24 May 1974 (age 51) Herentals, Belgium
- Height: 1.85 m (6 ft 1 in)
- Turned pro: 1993
- Plays: Right-handed
- Prize money: $717,393

Singles
- Career record: 52–76
- Career titles: 0
- Highest ranking: No. 65 (12 May 1997)

Grand Slam singles results
- Australian Open: 1R (1996, 1997, 1998)
- French Open: 3R (1998)
- Wimbledon: 1R (1996, 1997, 1998)
- US Open: 2R (1997)

Doubles
- Career record: 3–9
- Career titles: 0
- Highest ranking: No. 291 (24 February 1997)
- Last updated on: 31 January 2022.

Johan Van Herck (born 24 May 1974) is a Belgian tennis coach and former professional player.

Van Herck first broke into the top 100 of the ATP rankings in 1996, when he made semi-finals at the Copenhagen Open and Italy's Campionati Internazionali di Sicilia. In the later he upset top seed Félix Mantilla Botella in the second round.

In both 1997 and 1998, Van Herck was a semi-finalist at the Coral Springs International Tennis Championships.

He had his best Grand Slam performance at the 1998 French Open, where in the opening round he defeated world number four Greg Rusedski in straight sets. He then beat Spanish qualifier Jordi Mas to reach the third round, but was then eliminated by another qualifier, Jens Knippschild, despite winning the opening two sets, from which he dropped just two games.

Van Herck defeated another top player in the 1999 Grand Prix Hassan II, held in Casablanca, overcoming number one seed Thomas Muster.

He represented the Belgium Davis Cup team in nine ties during his career and had a combined 7-5 win loss record, all of his victories coming in singles rubbers. His biggest wins came against Russian Yevgeny Kafelnikov in 1995, Swede Thomas Enqvist in 1996 and Frenchman Cédric Pioline in 1997.

Since 2011 he has been the captain of the Belgian Davis Cup team. During his tenure, the team reached the final of the Davis Cup twice.

Since 2019 he has been the captain of the Belgian Fed Cup team as well.

== ATP Challenger and ITF Futures finals ==
=== Singles: 13 (8–5) ===
Legend ATP Challenger (8–4) ITF Futures (0–1)	Finals by surface Hard (2–1) Clay (6–4) Grass (0–0) Carpet (0–0)

Result	W–L	Date	Tournament	Tier	Surface	Opponent	Score
Loss	0-1	Jul 1994	Ostend, Belgium	Challenger	Clay	(Norway) Christian Ruud	6–2, 4–6, 1–6
Win	1-1	Feb 1995	Mendoza, Argentina	Challenger	Clay	(Spain) Juan Albert Viloca	7–6, 6–1
Win	2-1	Jul 1995	Montauban, France	Challenger	Clay	(Poland) Wojtek Kowalski	6–4, 4–6, 6–3
Win	3-1	Jul 1995	Ostend, Belgium	Challenger	Clay	(France) Frederic Fontang	6–3, 6–2
Win	4-1	Mar 1996	Stockholm, Sweden	Challenger	Hard	(Sweden) Jan Apell	6–3, 7–5
Loss	4-2	Jan 1997	Singapore, Singapore	Challenger	Hard	(Russia) Andrei Chesnokov	6–3, 6–7, 2–6
Win	5-2	Apr 1997	Paget, Bermuda	Challenger	Clay	(Armenia) Sargis Sargsian	6–1, 4–6, 6–0
Win	6-2	Apr 1997	Birmingham, United States	Challenger	Clay	(Germany) Tommy Haas	7–6, 6–7, 6–4
Win	7-2	Oct 1997	Brest, France	Challenger	Hard	(France) Sebastien Grosjean	4–6, 6–2, 6–4
Loss	7-3	Apr 1998	Birmingham, United States	Challenger	Clay	(Norway) Christian Ruud	6–2, 1–6, 1–6
Loss	7-4	Jun 2000	Italy F5, Turin	Futures	Clay	(Italy) Massimo Dell'Acqua	5–7, 2–6
Loss	7-5	Jul 2000	Ostend, Belgium	Challenger	Clay	(Belgium) Olivier Rochus	4–6, 4–6
Win	8-5	Jul 2000	Tampere, Finland	Challenger	Clay	(France) Olivier Mutis	6–3, 6–2

== Performance timeline ==
Key
W	F	SF	QF	#R	RR	Q#	DNQ	A	NH

(W) winner; (F) finalist; (SF) semifinalist; (QF) quarterfinalist; (#R) rounds 4, 3, 2, 1; (RR) round-robin stage; (Q#) qualification round; (DNQ) did not qualify; (A) absent; (NH) not held; (SR) strike rate (events won / competed); (W–L) win–loss record.

=== Singles ===
Tournament	1993	1994	1995	1996	1997	1998	1999	2000	SR	W–L	Win %
Grand Slam tournaments
Australian Open	A	A	A	1R	1R	1R	Q1	A	0 / 3	0–3	0%
French Open	A	A	2R	1R	1R	3R	Q2	Q3	0 / 4	3–4	43%
Wimbledon	A	A	A	1R	1R	1R	A	A	0 / 3	0–3	0%
US Open	A	A	1R	A	2R	A	A	A	0 / 2	1–2	33%
Win–loss	0–0	0–0	1–2	0–3	1–4	2–3	0–0	0–0	0 / 12	4–12	25%
ATP Masters Series
Miami	A	A	A	A	1R	1R	A	A	0 / 2	0–2	0%
Paris	Q2	A	A	A	A	A	A	A	0 / 0	0–0	–
Win–loss	0–0	0–0	0–0	0–0	0–1	0–1	0–0	0–0	0 / 2	0–2	0%
