= 1996 French Open – Men's singles =

Men's singles
- 1996 French Open

Final
- Champion: (Russia) Yevgeny Kafelnikov
- Runner-up: (Germany) Michael Stich
- Score: 7–6^{(7–4)}, 7–5, 7–6^{(7–4)}

Details
- Draw: 128
- Seeds: 16

Events
Singles	men	women		boys	girls
Doubles	men	women	mixed	boys	girls
WC Singles	men	women	quad
WC Doubles	men	women	quad
Legends	−45	45+	women
- French Open

Yevgeny Kafelnikov defeated Michael Stich in the final, 7–6^{(7–4)}, 7–5, 7–6^{(7–4)} to win the men's singles tennis title at the 1996 French Open. It was his first major singles title, becoming the first Russian to win a singles major.

Thomas Muster was the defending champion, but lost in the fourth round to Stich.

Pete Sampras was attempting to complete the career Grand Slam, but lost in the semifinals to Kafelnikov. This marked his career-best result at the French Open.

Future three-time champion and world No. 1 Gustavo Kuerten made his first appearance in the main draw of a major, losing to Wayne Ferreira in the first round. Three-time champion Mats Wilander made his final major appearance, losing to Todd Martin in the second round. This was also the first French Open appearance of future world No. 1 Carlos Moyá, who would win the title two years later; he lost to Stefan Edberg in the second round.

== Seeds ==
The seeded players are listed below. Yevgeny Kafelnikov is the champion; others show the round in which they were eliminated.

1. (United States) Pete Sampras (semifinals)
2. (Austria) Thomas Muster (fourth round)
3. (United States) Andre Agassi (second round)
4. (United States) Michael Chang (third round)
5. (Croatia) Goran Ivanišević (fourth round)
6. (Russia) Yevgeny Kafelnikov (champion)
7. (United States) Jim Courier (quarterfinals)
8. (Sweden) Thomas Enqvist (first round)
9. (Chile) Marcelo Ríos (fourth round)
10. (South Africa) Wayne Ferreira (fourth round)
11. (France) Arnaud Boetsch (second round)
12. (Spain) Albert Costa (second round)
13. (Netherlands) Richard Krajicek (quarterfinals)
14. (Switzerland) Marc Rosset (semifinals)
15. (Germany) Michael Stich (finalist)
16. (United States) MaliVai Washington (first round)

== Draw ==
Key

- Q = Qualifier
- WC = Wild card
- LL = Lucky loser
- Alt = Alternate
- ITF = ITF entry
- PR = Protected ranking
- SR = Special ranking
- SE = Special exempt
- JE = Junior exempt
- JR = Junior Accelerator Programme entrant
- CO = College Accelerator Programme entrant
- NG = Next Gen Accelerator Program entrant
- w/o = Walkover
- r = Retired
- d = Defaulted

=== Finals ===
Quarterfinals
1	(United States) Pete Sampras	6^{4}	4	6	6	6
7	(United States) Jim Courier	7^{7}	6	4	4	4
13	(Netherlands) Richard Krajicek	3	4	7^{7}	2
6	(Russia) Yevgeny Kafelnikov	6	6	6^{4}	6
(Germany) Bernd Karbacher	6	6	3	5	0
14	(Switzerland) Marc Rosset	4	4	6	7	6
(France) Cédric Pioline	4	6	3	2
15	(Germany) Michael Stich	6	4	6	6

Semifinals
1	(United States) Pete Sampras	6^{4}	0	2
6	(Russia) Yevgeny Kafelnikov	7^{7}	6	6
14	(Switzerland) Marc Rosset	3	4	2
15	(Germany) Michael Stich	6	6	6

Final
6	(Russia) Yevgeny Kafelnikov	7^{7}	7	7^{7}
15	(Germany) Michael Stich	6^{4}	5	6^{4}

=== Top half ===
==== Section 1 ====
First round
1	(United States) P Sampras	6	7	7^{7}
(Sweden) M Gustafsson	1	5	6^{5}
(Spain) J Sánchez	1	5	4
(Spain) S Bruguera	6	7	6
(France) J-P Fleurian	5	4	1
(Sweden) M Wilander	7	6	6
(Denmark) K Carlsen	1	1	7^{7}	2
(United States) T Martin	6	6	6^{5}	6
(Zimbabwe) B Black	5	3	0
(Australia) S Draper	7	6	6
(Austria) G Schaller	6	6	7
WC	(France) S Simian	3	4	5
(United States) J Tarango	4	6	4	6	6
(Czech Republic) M Damm	6	2	6	3	4
Q	(Argentina) F Squillari	7^{7}	6	3
16	(United States) M Washington	6^{4}	4	0^{r}

Second round
1	(United States) P Sampras	6	6	6^{2}	2	6
(Spain) S Bruguera	3	4	7^{7}	6	3
(Sweden) M Wilander	4	6^{5}	2
(United States) T Martin	6	7^{7}	6
(Australia) S Draper	2	6	6	6
(Austria) G Schaller	6	3	2	4
(United States) J Tarango	6	6	6
Q	(Argentina) F Squillari	4	4	1

Third round
1	(United States) P Sampras	3	6	7	4	6
(United States) T Martin	6	4	5	6	2
(Australia) S Draper	6	6	6
(United States) J Tarango	1	2	3

Fourth round
1	(United States) P Sampras	6	7	6
(Australia) S Draper	4	5	2

==== Section 2 ====
First round
10	(South Africa) W Ferreira	6	7	7^{7}
Q	(Brazil) G Kuerten	4	5	6^{4}
Q	(Argentina) G Etlis	3	2	6^{3}
(Czech Republic) S Doseděl	6	6	7^{7}
(New Zealand) B Steven	6	6	7^{7}
WC	(France) G Carraz	2	2	6^{3}
(France) J Golmard	4	6	6	5	4
(Italy) R Furlan	6	3	1	7	6
WC	(Spain) R Carretero	6	6^{8}	6	2	2
(Slovakia) K Kučera	3	7^{10}	4	6	6
(Colombia) M Hadad	6	3	2	0
LL	(Sweden) M Norman	4	6	6	6
(Japan) S Matsuoka	6^{2}	5	7^{7}	1
(Czech Republic) D Rikl	7^{7}	7	6^{4}	6
Q	(Russia) A Olhovskiy	1	6	6^{4}	4
7	(United States) J Courier	6	3	7^{7}	6

Second round
10	(South Africa) W Ferreira	4	7^{9}	6	7^{7}
(Czech Republic) S Doseděl	6	6^{7}	1	6^{4}
(New Zealand) B Steven	0	2	4
(Italy) R Furlan	6	6	6
(Slovakia) K Kučera	7^{7}	6	6^{5}	4	6
LL	(Sweden) M Norman	6^{5}	4	7^{7}	6	2
(Czech Republic) D Rikl	3	2	2
7	(United States) J Courier	6	6	6

Third round
10	(South Africa) W Ferreira	6^{5}	7	6	7
(Italy) R Furlan	7^{7}	5	1	5
(Slovakia) K Kučera	7^{7}	5	4	4^{r}
7	(United States) J Courier	6^{2}	7	6	5

Fourth round
10	(South Africa) W Ferreira	6	1	3	3
7	(United States) J Courier	4	6	6	6

==== Section 3 ====
First round
3	(United States) A Agassi	6	6^{7}	6	6
Q	(Spain) J Díaz	1	7^{9}	4	4
(United States) C Woodruff	6	6	3	7^{7}
(United States) V Spadea	2	2	6	6^{4}
WC	(France) T Champion	2	6	7^{7}	4	7
(Australia) S Stolle	6	4	6^{3}	6	5
(Belgium) F Dewulf	4	4	3
(Sweden) J Björkman	6	6	6
LL	(Sweden) N Kulti	6	2	6	4	1
(Australia) T Woodbridge	0	6	2	6	6
(Australia) M Philippoussis	6	6	6
(Russia) A Volkov	3	2	2
(Spain) T Carbonell	4	6	6	7^{7}
Q	(Egypt) T El Sawy	6	4	4	6^{5}
(Hungary) S Noszály	6	6^{2}	1	4
13	(Netherlands) R Krajicek	4	7^{7}	6	6

Second round
3	(United States) A Agassi	6	4	7^{9}	3	2
(United States) C Woodruff	4	6	6^{7}	6	6
WC	(France) T Champion	7	1	4	0
(Sweden) J Björkman	5	6	6	6
(Australia) T Woodbridge	3	6	7^{7}	7^{7}
(Australia) M Philippoussis	6	4	6^{1}	6^{2}
(Spain) T Carbonell	2	6	6^{2}	2
13	(Netherlands) R Krajicek	6	4	7^{7}	6

Third round
(United States) C Woodruff	6^{5}	6	6	5	4
(Sweden) J Björkman	7^{7}	2	4	7	6
(Australia) T Woodbridge	5	2	2
13	(Netherlands) R Krajicek	7	6	6

Fourth round
(Sweden) J Björkman	3	2	4
13	(Netherlands) R Krajicek	6	6	6

==== Section 4 ====
First round
12	(Spain) A Costa	3	6	6	7^{7}
(Brazil) F Meligeni	6	4	3	6^{2}
(Belgium) J Van Herck	6	5	6^{2}	3
(Spain) F Clavet	4	7	7^{7}	6
(United Kingdom) T Henman	4	4	5
(Belgium) K Goossens	6	6	7
(Russia) A Chesnokov	6^{5}	6^{4}	6	6	4
(France) G Forget	7^{7}	7^{7}	2	3	6
Q	(Germany) D Dier	4	2	7	4
(Spain) F Mantilla	6	6	5	6
(Australia) M Woodforde	3	4	6	4
(Spain) À Corretja	6	6	0	6
WC	(France) H Leconte	1	1	4
(Sweden) T Johansson	6	6	6
Q	(Spain) G Blanco	1	3	3
6	(Russia) Y Kafelnikov	6	6	6

Second round
12	(Spain) A Costa	4	3	6	6^{6}
(Spain) F Clavet	6	6	4	7^{8}
(Belgium) K Goossens	4	4	6	6	3
(France) G Forget	6	6	3	3	6
(Spain) F Mantilla	7^{7}	6	6
(Spain) À Corretja	6^{2}	2	4
(Sweden) T Johansson	2	5	3
6	(Russia) Y Kafelnikov	6	7	6

Third round
(Spain) F Clavet	6	7	6
(France) G Forget	3	5	3
(Spain) F Mantilla	4	2	2
6	(Russia) Y Kafelnikov	6	6	6

Fourth round
(Spain) F Clavet	4	3	3
6	(Russia) Y Kafelnikov	6	6	6

=== Bottom half ===
==== Section 5 ====
First round
5	(Croatia) G Ivanišević	6	6	6
(Spain) J Arrese	4	4	1
(United States) D Wheaton	6^{3}	6	6	6
(France) G Raoux	7^{7}	0	4	4
(Czech Republic) B Ulihrach	6	6	6
Q	(United States) F Montana	2	4	2
(Ecuador) N Lapentti	2	2	3
(Ukraine) A Medvedev	6	6	6
(Italy) A Gaudenzi	6	6	6
Q	(Finland) K Tiilikainen	3	1	1
(Germany) B Karbacher	6	6	6
(Argentina) G Pérez Roldán	2	4	4
(Morocco) Y El Aynaoui	5	6^{6}	0^{r}
(Netherlands) P Haarhuis	7	7^{8}	3
Q	(United States) J Palmer	3	4	3
11	(France) A Boetsch	6	6	6

Second round
5	(Croatia) G Ivanišević	7	6	6
(United States) D Wheaton	5	2	4
(Czech Republic) B Ulihrach	6	6^{10}	6	6
(Ukraine) A Medvedev	3	7^{12}	1	4
(Italy) A Gaudenzi	3	4	4
(Germany) B Karbacher	6	6	6
(Netherlands) P Haarhuis	7	2	6	6
11	(France) A Boetsch	5	6	2	4

Third round
5	(Croatia) G Ivanišević	6	6	6
(Czech Republic) B Ulihrach	4	2	2
(Germany) B Karbacher	4	6	6	6
(Netherlands) P Haarhuis	6	4	2	3

Fourth round
5	(Croatia) G Ivanišević	3	1	2
(Germany) B Karbacher	6	6	6

==== Section 6 ====
First round
14	(Switzerland) M Rosset	6	6	6
(Germany) C-U Steeb	4	4	0
(Czech Republic) J Novák	2	4	6	6	6
(Venezuela) N Pereira	6	6	2	1	1
(Switzerland) J Hlasek	6	6	4	6
(Sweden) M Larsson	1	4	6	3
(Netherlands) J Siemerink	7^{7}	6	6
(Argentina) H Gumy	6^{4}	3	1
(Morocco) K Alami	4	2	4
(Sweden) S Edberg	6	6	6
(Spain) C Moyá	6	7^{7}	6
(Australia) P Rafter	4	6^{1}	2
(Australia) R Fromberg	6	6	6
WC	(France) O Delaître	3	1	3
(Germany) D Prinosil	1	1	2
4	(United States) M Chang	6	6	6

Second round
14	(Switzerland) M Rosset	6	6	6
(Czech Republic) J Novák	2	4	3
(Switzerland) J Hlasek	6	1	6	7^{7}
(Netherlands) J Siemerink	2	6	3	6^{3}
(Sweden) S Edberg	6	6	6
(Spain) C Moyá	2	2	1
(Australia) R Fromberg	4	6	6^{5}	4
4	(United States) M Chang	6	3	7^{7}	6

Third round
14	(Switzerland) M Rosset	6	6	6
(Switzerland) J Hlasek	4	4	1
(Sweden) S Edberg	4	7	6	7^{7}
4	(United States) M Chang	6	5	0	6^{1}

Fourth round
14	(Switzerland) M Rosset	7^{7}	6	6
(Sweden) S Edberg	6^{4}	3	3

==== Section 7 ====
First round
8	(Sweden) T Enqvist	2	6	6	4	4
(United States) R Reneberg	6	3	3	6	6
(France) C Pioline	6	6	6
(Argentina) J Frana	1	3	2
(Spain) A Berasategui	6	6	3	6
(Australia) M Tebbutt	4	4	6	3
(Germany) H Dreekmann	6	6	6
(Norway) C Ruud	4	3	0
Q	(France) F Fontang	6	4	0	1
WC	(France) L Roux	3	6	6	6
(Italy) S Pescosolido	6	4	6	2	4
(Czech Republic) P Korda	4	6	2	6	6
Q	(Slovakia) J Krošlák	1	2	1
(Australia) J Stoltenberg	6	6	6
(United States) M Joyce	6^{4}	1	4
9	(Chile) M Ríos	7^{7}	6	6

Second round
(United States) R Reneberg	5	2	3
(France) C Pioline	7	6	6
(Spain) A Berasategui	6	6	6
(Germany) H Dreekmann	2	2	3
WC	(France) L Roux	5	4	4
(Czech Republic) P Korda	7	6	6
(Australia) J Stoltenberg	4	3	3
9	(Chile) M Ríos	6	6	6

Third round
(France) C Pioline	4	6	6	6
(Spain) A Berasategui	6	1	4	0
(Czech Republic) P Korda	3	3	2
9	(Chile) M Ríos	6	6	6

Fourth round
(France) C Pioline	6	6	6
9	(Chile) M Ríos	4	1	2

==== Section 8 ====
First round
15	(Germany) M Stich	6	7	6
Q	(Sweden) P Fredriksson	4	5	4
Q	(Australia) G Doyle	2	6	5	6	5
(United Kingdom) G Rusedski	6	1	7	2	7
Q	(Belgium) D Norman	7	3	6	3	4
(The Bahamas) M Knowles	5	6	4	6	6
(Sweden) M Tillström	4	2	6	7	6
(Spain) C Costa	6	6	1	5	1
(Romania) A Voinea	3	6	7^{7}	5	6
(Germany) M-K Goellner	6	3	6^{5}	7	2
(Netherlands) S Schalken	6	6	1	6
(Czech Republic) D Vacek	3	3	6	3
(South Africa) M Ondruska	3	4	6	7^{7}	7
WC	(France) G Solvès	6	6	3	6^{4}	9
(Denmark) F Fetterlein	4	2	4
2	(Austria) T Muster	6	6	6

Second round
15	(Germany) M Stich	6	7	6
(United Kingdom) G Rusedski	3	5	3
(The Bahamas) M Knowles	7	3	6	4	3
(Sweden) M Tillström	5	6	1	6	6
(Romania) A Voinea	5	6	6	6
(Netherlands) S Schalken	7	3	4	2
WC	(France) G Solvès	1	3	0
2	(Austria) T Muster	6	6	6

Third round
15	(Germany) M Stich	4	6	6	7^{7}
(Sweden) M Tillström	6	0	4	6^{3}
(Romania) A Voinea	2	2^{r}
2	(Austria) T Muster	6	5

Fourth round
15	(Germany) M Stich	4	6	6	7^{7}
2	(Austria) T Muster	6	4	1	6^{1}

Preceded by 1996 Australian Open – Men's singles	Grand Slam men's singles	Succeeded by 1996 Wimbledon Championships – Men's singles
