= 1996 French Open – Mixed doubles =

Tennis tournament

Mixed doubles
- 1996 French Open

Final
- Champions: (Argentina) Patricia Tarabini (Argentina) Javier Frana
- Runners-up: (United States) Nicole Arendt (United States) Luke Jensen
- Score: 6–2, 6–2

Details
- Draw: 48
- Seeds: 16

Events
Singles	men	women		boys	girls
Doubles	men	women	mixed	boys	girls
WC Singles	men	women	quad
WC Doubles	men	women	quad
Legends	−45	45+	women
- French Open

Larisa Neiland and Todd Woodbridge were the defending champions, but competed this year with different partners. Neiland teamed up with Mark Woodforde and were eliminated in semifinals, while Woodbridge partnered with Nicole Bradtke and were eliminated in quarterfinals.

Patricia Tarabini and Javier Frana won the title, defeating Nicole Arendt and Luke Jensen 6–2, 6–2 in the final. It was the 1st and only mixed doubles title for both players in their careers.

== Seeds ==
The seeded players are listed below. Patricia Tarabini and Javier Frana are the champions; others show the round in which they were eliminated.
All seeds received a bye into the second round.

1. (Latvia) Larisa Neiland / (Australia) Mark Woodforde (semifinals)
2. (United States) Gigi Fernández / (Czech Republic) Cyril Suk (third round)
3. (Netherlands) Manon Bollegraf / (United States) Rick Leach (semifinals)
4. (United States) Lisa Raymond / (United States) Patrick Galbraith (second round)
5. (Czech Republic) Helena Suková / (South Africa) Ellis Ferreira (second round)
6. (Australia) Nicole Bradtke / (Australia) Todd Woodbridge (quarterfinals)
7. (Netherlands) Kristie Boogert / (Russia) Andrei Olhovskiy (quarterfinals)
8. (United States) Katrina Adams / (Belgium) Libor Pimek (quarterfinals)
9. (Netherlands) Brenda Schultz-McCarthy / (United States) Mark Keil (second round)
10. (United States) Linda Wild / (South Africa) Byron Talbot (second round)
11. (Switzerland) Martina Hingis / (Australia) Mark Philippoussis (quarterfinals)
12. (United States) Meredith McGrath / (United States) Matt Lucena (third round)
13. (Belgium) Els Callens / (Netherlands) Menno Oosting (third round)
14. (Romania) Irina Spîrlea / (United States) Greg Van Emburgh (second round)
15. (Japan) Nana Miyagi / (United States) Kent Kinnear (second round)
16. (Canada) Jill Hetherington / (South Africa) John-Laffnie de Jager (third round)

== Draw ==
Key

- Q = Qualifier
- WC = Wild card
- LL = Lucky loser
- Alt = Alternate
- ITF = ITF entry
- PR = Protected ranking
- SR = Special ranking
- SE = Special exempt
- JE = Junior exempt
- JR = Junior Accelerator Programme entrant
- CO = College Accelerator Programme entrant
- NG = Next Gen Accelerator Program entrant
- w/o = Walkover
- r = Retired
- d = Defaulted

=== Finals ===
Quarterfinals
1	(Latvia) Larisa Neiland (Australia) Mark Woodforde	6	6
6	(Australia) Nicole Bradtke (Australia) Todd Woodbridge	3	3
(United States) Nicole Arendt (United States) Luke Jensen	6	3	6
7	(Netherlands) Kristie Boogert (Russia) Andrei Olhovskiy	3	6	3
11	(Switzerland) Martina Hingis (Australia) Mark Philippoussis	4	6	4
3	(Netherlands) Manon Bollegraf (United States) Rick Leach	6	4	6
8	(United States) Katrina Adams (Belgium) Libor Pimek	4	6	3
(Argentina) Patricia Tarabini (Argentina) Javier Frana	6	2	6

Semifinals
1	(Latvia) Larisa Neiland (Australia) Mark Woodforde	3	3
(United States) Nicole Arendt (United States) Luke Jensen	6	6
3	(Netherlands) Manon Bollegraf (United States) Rick Leach	2	6^{2}
(Argentina) Patricia Tarabini (Argentina) Javier Frana	6	7^{7}

Final
(United States) Nicole Arendt (United States) Luke Jensen	2	2
(Argentina) Patricia Tarabini (Argentina) Javier Frana	6	6

=== Top half ===
==== Section 1 ====
First round
WC	(France) S Pitkowski (Iran) M Bahrami	6	2	4
(Belgium) N Feber (United States) J Waite	3	6	6
(Canada) P Hy-Boulais (South Africa) B Haygarth	6	6
(Japan) R Hiraki (South Africa) L Bale	2	3
(Australia) C Barclay (Australia) A Florent	6	6
(Netherlands) M Oremans (Netherlands) S Noteboom	3	2
(United States) K Rinaldi-Stunkel (United States) K Jones	6^{8}	7^{7}	6
WC	(France) K Quentrec-Eagle (France) T Guardiola	7^{10}	6^{5}	4

Second round
1	(Latvia) L Neiland (Australia) M Woodforde	6	6
(Belgium) N Feber (United States) J Waite	1	2
(Canada) P Hy-Boulais (South Africa) B Haygarth	7^{7}	3	2
12	(United States) M McGrath (United States) M Lucena	6^{3}	6	6
15	(Japan) N Miyagi (United States) K Kinnear	3	7	5
(Australia) C Barclay (Australia) A Florent	6	5	7
(United States) K Rinaldi-Stunkel (United States) K Jones	7	4	3
6	(Australia) N Bradtke (Australia) T Woodbridge	5	6	6

Third round
1	(Latvia) L Neiland (Australia) M Woodforde	7^{7}	4	6
12	(United States) M McGrath (United States) M Lucena	6^{5}	6	2
(Australia) C Barclay (Australia) A Florent	3	2
6	(Australia) N Bradtke (Australia) T Woodbridge	6	6

Quarterfinals
1	(Latvia) L Neiland (Australia) M Woodforde	6	6
6	(Australia) N Bradtke (Australia) T Woodbridge	3	3

==== Section 2 ====
First round
(Russia) E Maniokova (South Africa) D Adams	5	4
(United States) N Arendt (United States) L Jensen	7	6
Alt	(Australia) L Pleming (Argentina) L Lobo	7^{7}	1	6
(France) A Dechaume-Balleret (France) J-P Fleurian	6^{4}	6	4
(Canada) R Simpson (United Kingdom) N Broad	3	6	5
(Indonesia) Y Basuki (United States) K Flach	6	4	7
(Netherlands) S Rottier (South Africa) M Barnard	6	3	6
(Australia) R Stubbs (Australia) P Tramacchi	2	6	3

Second round
4	(United States) L Raymond (United States) P Galbraith	6^{6}	3
(United States) N Arendt (United States) L Jensen	7^{8}	6
Alt	(Australia) L Pleming (Argentina) L Lobo	6	3	6
9	(Netherlands) B Schultz-McCarthy (United States) M Keil	4	6	3
13	(Belgium) E Callens (Netherlands) M Oosting	7	6^{7}	7
(Indonesia) Y Basuki (United States) K Flach	5	7^{9}	5
(Netherlands) S Rottier (South Africa) M Barnard	3	3
7	(Netherlands) K Boogert (Russia) A Olhovskiy	6	6

Third round
(United States) N Arendt (United States) L Jensen	w/o
Alt	(Australia) L Pleming (Argentina) L Lobo
13	(Belgium) E Callens (Netherlands) M Oosting	7	5	3
7	(Netherlands) K Boogert (Russia) A Olhovskiy	5	7	6

Quarterfinals
(United States) N Arendt (United States) L Jensen	6	3	6
7	(Netherlands) K Boogert (Russia) A Olhovskiy	3	6	3

=== Bottom half ===
==== Section 3 ====
First round
(United States) D Graham (United States) S Davis	3	1
(United States) A Frazier (United States) T Kronemann	6	6
(United States) K Po (United States) B Behrens	7^{7}	4	5
(Netherlands) C Vis (Netherlands) T Nijssen	6^{4}	6	7
(Australia) K-A Guse (Australia) W Arthurs	6	3	4
(Italy) L Golarsa (South Africa) C van Rensburg	3	6	6
(Australia) R McQuillan (Australia) D Macpherson	4	7	6
(Australia) K Radford (Australia) J Eagle	6	5	4

Second round
5	(Czech Republic) H Suková (South Africa) E Ferreira	4	4
(United States) A Frazier (United States) T Kronemann	6	6
(Netherlands) C Vis (Netherlands) T Nijssen	3	6^{4}
11	(Switzerland) M Hingis (Australia) M Philippoussis	6	7^{7}
16	(Canada) J Hetherington (South Africa) J-L de Jager	6	3	6
(Italy) L Golarsa (South Africa) C van Rensburg	3	6	3
(Australia) R McQuillan (Australia) D Macpherson	6^{4}	7	4
3	(Netherlands) M Bollegraf (United States) R Leach	7^{7}	5	6

Third round
(United States) A Frazier (United States) T Kronemann	1	2
11	(Switzerland) M Hingis (Australia) M Philippoussis	6	6
16	(Canada) J Hetherington (South Africa) J-L de Jager	3	3
3	(Netherlands) M Bollegraf (United States) R Leach	6	6

Quarterfinals
11	(Switzerland) M Hingis (Australia) M Philippoussis	4	6	4
3	(Netherlands) M Bollegraf (United States) R Leach	6	4	6

==== Section 4 ====
First round
(France) I Demongeot (France) G Raoux	6	2	3
(France) A Fusai (France) R Gilbert	3	6	6
(Japan) A Sugiyama (Australia) P Kilderry	6	6
WC	(France) N Herreman (France) F Vitoux	1	2
(Croatia) I Majoli (United States) M Jensen	4	5
(Argentina) P Tarabini (Argentina) J Frana	6	7
WC	(France) A Cocheteux (France) O Mutis	6	1	1
WC	(France) S Testud (France) L Barthez	4	6	6

Second round
8	(United States) K Adams (Belgium) L Pimek	6	6
(France) A Fusai (France) R Gilbert	0	3
(Japan) A Sugiyama (Australia) P Kilderry	6	6
10	(United States) L Wild (South Africa) B Talbot	2	3
14	(Romania) I Spîrlea (United States) G van Emburgh	6	4	6
(Argentina) P Tarabini (Argentina) J Frana	4	6	8
WC	(France) S Testud (France) L Barthez
2	(United States) G Fernández (Czech Republic) C Suk	w/o

Third round
8	(United States) K Adams (Belgium) L Pimek	6	6^{6}	7
(Japan) A Sugiyama (Australia) P Kilderry	4	7^{8}	5
(Argentina) P Tarabini (Argentina) J Frana	5	6	10
2	(United States) G Fernández (Czech Republic) C Suk	7	3	8

Quarterfinals
8	(United States) K Adams (Belgium) L Pimek	4	6	3
(Argentina) P Tarabini (Argentina) J Frana	6	2	6
