= 1994 Campionati Internazionali di Sicilia =

- Date: 26 September – 2 October
- Edition: 16th
- Category: World Series
- Draw: 32S / 16D
- Prize money: $290,000
- Surface: Clay / outdoor
- Location: Palermo, Italy

Champions

Singles
- (Spain) Alberto Berasategui

Doubles
- (Netherlands) Tom Kempers / (United States) Jack Waite
- Campionati Internazionali di Sicilia

The 1994 Campionati Internazionali di Sicilia was a men's tennis tournament played on outdoor clay courts in Palermo, Italy and part of the World Series of the 1994 ATP Tour. It was the 16th edition of the tournament and took place from 26 September until 2 October 1994. First-seeded Alberto Berasategui won the singles title.

== Finals ==
=== Singles ===
(Spain) Alberto Berasategui defeated (Spain) Àlex Corretja 2–6, 7–6^{(8–6)}, 6–4

- It was Berasategui's 4th singles title of the year and the 5th of his career.

=== Doubles ===
(Netherlands) Tom Kempers / (United States) Jack Waite defeated (United Kingdom) Neil Broad / (United States) Greg Van Emburgh 7–6, 6–4
