= Adrian Voinea =

Romanian tennis player

- Country (sports): Romania
- Born: 6 August 1974 (age 51) Focșani, SR Romania
- Height: 1.85 m (6 ft 1 in)
- Turned pro: 1993
- Retired: 2003
- Plays: Right-handed (one-handed backhand)
- Prize money: $1,836,277

Singles
- Career record: 136–176
- Career titles: 1
- Highest ranking: No. 36 (15 April 1996)

Grand Slam singles results
- Australian Open: 4R (2002)
- French Open: QF (1995)
- Wimbledon: 3R (2002)
- US Open: 3R (1998)

Doubles
- Career record: 1–10
- Career titles: 0
- Highest ranking: No. 349 (21 August 1995)
- Last updated on: 21 April 2022.

Adrian Voinea (born 6 August 1974) is a former Romanian tennis player. He has been ranked as high as No. 36 in singles by the ATP. Voinea has won one ATP Tour singles title on the ATP Tour.

Between 1995 and 2003, Voinea played in 12 Davis Cup ties for the Romania Davis Cup team and compiled a record of ten wins and eight losses.

== Early life ==
Voinea was born in Focșani, Romania. He started playing tennis with George Bucuroiu as his first coach. As a teenager, Voinea was among the top 3 on the national level. He moved to Italy when he was 15 years old with his older brother, Marian. Marian encouraged Adrian to play tennis, playing a crucial role in developing his tennis career.

After their arrival, the brothers were often short of money but were helped out by several people, including a nun from a church in Turin and Fabrizio Fanucci. Voinea was working with a tennis coach Alberto Castellani, who allowed him to train in Perugia for free as a personal guest.

== Professional career ==
=== 1995 ===
Voinea achieved his greatest success in Grand Slam tournaments by advancing to the quarterfinals of the 1995 French Open as a qualifier, defeating Karol Kučera, Johan Van Herck, Boris Becker and Andrei Chesnokov.

=== 1996 ===
Voinea reached his career-high ATP singles ranking of World No. 36 in April 1996. He reached the final of the 1996 Campionati Internazionali di Sicilia against Karim Alami, where he was forced to retire due to a right arm injury.

=== 1999 ===
Voinea defeated fifth-seeded Stefan Koubek in the final of the 1999 Brighton International in Bournemouth to win his only singles title at an ATP Tour event.

== ATP career finals ==
=== Singles: 1 (1 title, 1 runner-up) ===
Legend Grand Slam Tournaments (0–0) ATP World Tour Finals (0–0) ATP Masters 1000 Series (0–0) ATP 500 Series (0–0) ATP 250 Series (1–1)	Finals by surface Hard (0–0) Clay (1–1) Grass (0–0) Carpet (0–0)	Finals by setting Outdoors (1–1) Indoors (0–0)

Result	W–L	Date	Tournament	Tier	Surface	Opponent	Score
Loss	0–1	Sep 1996	Palermo, Italy	International Series	Clay	(Morocco) Karim Alami	5–7, 1–2 ret.
Win	1–1	Sep 1999	Bournemouth, United Kingdom	International Series	Clay	(Austria) Stefan Koubek	1–6, 7–5, 7–6^{(7–2)}

== ATP Challenger and ITF Futures finals ==
=== Singles: 7 (4–3) ===
Legend ATP Challenger (4–3) ITF Futures (0–0)	Finals by surface Hard (1–0) Clay (3–3) Grass (0–0) Carpet (0–0)

Result	W–L	Date	Tournament	Tier	Surface	Opponent	Score
Win	1-0	May 1995	Valletta, Malta	Challenger	Hard	(Slovakia) Ján Krošlák	6–3, 6–4
Loss	1-1	May 1995	Ljubljana, Slovenia	Challenger	Clay	(Spain) Jordi Burillo	2–6, 1–6
Win	2-1	Jun 1995	Košice, Slovakia	Challenger	Clay	(Spain) Roberto Carretero-Diaz	6–3, 4–6, 6–1
Loss	2-2	May 1998	Ljubljana, Slovenia	Challenger	Clay	(Romania) Dinu-Mihai Pescariu	6–7, 6–2, 3–6
Win	3-2	Jul 1998	Venice, Italy	Challenger	Clay	(Argentina) Franco Squillari	6–3, 6–3
Loss	3-3	Aug 2000	Poznań, Poland	Challenger	Clay	(Belgium) Christophe Rochus	4–6, 6–3, 6–7^{(4–7)}
Win	4-3	Jun 2001	Biella, Italy	Challenger	Clay	(Belgium) Christophe Rochus	3–6, 6–3, 6–4

=== Doubles: 1 (0–1) ===
Legend ATP Challenger (0–1) ITF Futures (0–0)	Finals by surface Hard (0–0) Clay (0–1) Grass (0–0) Carpet (0–0)

Result	W–L	Date	Tournament	Tier	Surface	Partner	Opponents	Score
Loss	0–1	Jun 1995	Košice, Slovakia	Challenger	Clay	(United States) Jeff Tarango	(Czech Republic) Jiří Novák (Czech Republic) David Rikl	6–7, 2–6

== Performance timeline ==
Key
W	F	SF	QF	#R	RR	Q#	DNQ	A	NH

(W) winner; (F) finalist; (SF) semifinalist; (QF) quarterfinalist; (#R) rounds 4, 3, 2, 1; (RR) round-robin stage; (Q#) qualification round; (DNQ) did not qualify; (A) absent; (NH) not held; (SR) strike rate (events won / competed); (W–L) win–loss record.

=== Singles ===
Tournament	1993	1994	1995	1996	1997	1998	1999	2000	2001	2002	2003	2004	2005	2006	2007	SR	W–L	Win %
Grand Slam tournaments
Australian Open	A	A	2R	2R	2R	A	1R	3R	1R	4R	2R	A	A	A	Q1	0 / 8	9–8	53%
French Open	Q2	1R	QF	3R	1R	Q1	1R	1R	Q3	2R	1R	A	A	A	Q1	0 / 8	7–8	47%
Wimbledon	A	Q3	A	1R	1R	A	1R	1R	A	3R	1R	A	A	A	A	0 / 6	2–6	25%
US Open	A	A	1R	A	2R	3R	Q2	2R	Q3	1R	A	A	A	A	A	0 / 5	4–5	44%
Win–loss	0–0	0–1	5–3	3–3	2–4	2–1	0–3	3–4	0–1	6–4	1–3	0–0	0–0	0–0	0–0	0 / 27	22–27	45%
ATP World Tour Masters 1000
Indian Wells	A	A	A	3R	2R	A	A	A	A	A	A	A	A	A	A	0 / 2	3–2	60%
Miami	A	A	A	A	2R	A	2R	A	A	4R	1R	A	A	A	A	0 / 4	5–4	–
Monte Carlo	A	A	1R	A	Q2	Q1	A	Q1	Q2	Q2	Q2	A	A	A	A	0 / 1	0–1	0%
Hamburg	A	A	A	2R	A	A	3R	1R	A	3R	1R	A	A	A	A	0 / 5	5–5	50%
Rome	Q1	Q3	A	2R	A	A	1R	Q1	1R	Q2	Q1	A	A	A	A	0 / 3	1–3	25%
Canada	A	A	1R	A	A	A	A	A	A	A	A	A	A	A	A	0 / 1	0–1	0%
Stuttgart	A	A	A	Q2	A	A	A	Q1	A	Not Held						0 / 0	0–0	–
Madrid	Not Held									Q1	Q1	A	A	A	A	0 / 0	0–0	–
Paris	A	A	1R	A	A	A	A	A	Q1	Q2	A	A	A	A	A	0 / 1	0–1	0%
Win–loss	0–0	0–0	0–3	4–3	2–2	0–0	3–3	0–1	0–1	5–2	0–2	0–0	0–0	0–0	0–0	0 / 17	14–17	45%
