= 1996 French Open – Women's doubles =

Women's doubles
- 1996 French Open

Final
- Champions: (United States) Lindsay Davenport (United States) Mary Joe Fernández
- Runners-up: (United States) Gigi Fernández (Belarus) Natasha Zvereva
- Score: 6–2, 6–1

Details
- Draw: 64 (4 WC )
- Seeds: 16

Events
Singles	men	women		boys	girls
Doubles	men	women	mixed	boys	girls
WC Singles	men	women	quad
WC Doubles	men	women	quad
Legends	−45	45+	women
← 1995 ·	French Open	· 1997 →

Lindsay Davenport and Mary Joe Fernández defeated the four-time defending champions Gigi Fernández and Natasha Zvereva in the final, 6–2, 6–1 to win the women's doubles tennis title at the 1996 French Open. It was Davenport's first major title; she would go on to win a further two majors in doubles and three majors in singles, eventually becoming the world No. 1 in both disciplines.

== Seeds ==
The seeded players are listed below. Lindsay Davenport and Mary Joe Fernández are the champions; others show the round in which they were eliminated.

1. (Czech Republic) Jana Novotná / (Spain) Arantxa Sánchez Vicario (semifinals)
2. (United States) Gigi Fernández / (Belarus) Natasha Zvereva (final)
3. (United States) Meredith McGrath / (Latvia) Larisa Neiland (semifinals)
4. (United States) Lindsay Davenport / (United States) Mary Joe Fernández (champions)
5. (United States) Nicole Arendt / (Netherlands) Manon Bollegraf (quarterfinals)
6. (Switzerland) Martina Hingis / (Czech Republic) Helena Suková (quarterfinals)
7. (United States) Lisa Raymond / (Australia) Rennae Stubbs (third round)
8. (France) Julie Halard-Decugis / (France) Nathalie Tauziat (third round)
9. (United States) Katrina Adams / (South Africa) Mariaan de Swardt (quarterfinals)
10. (Netherlands) Kristie Boogert / (Australia) Nicole Bradtke (first round)
11. (South Africa) Amanda Coetzer / (Netherlands) Brenda Schultz-McCarthy (second round)
12. (Spain) Conchita Martínez / (Argentina) Patricia Tarabini (third round)
13. (Italy) Laura Golarsa / (Romania) Irina Spîrlea (first round)
14. (Indonesia) Yayuk Basuki / (Netherlands) Caroline Vis (third round)
15. (France) Alexia Dechaume-Balleret / (France) Sandrine Testud (second round)
16. (Belgium) Els Callens / (Belgium) Laurence Courtois (first round)

== Draw ==
=== Key ===
- Q = Qualifier
- WC = Wild card
- LL = Lucky loser
- Alt = Alternate
- SE = Special exempt
- PR = Protected ranking
- ITF = ITF entry
- JE = Junior exempt
- w/o = Walkover
- r = Retired
- d = Defaulted
- SR = Special ranking

=== Finals ===
Quarterfinals
1	(Czech Republic) Jana Novotná (Spain) Arantxa Sánchez Vicario	6	6
5	(United States) Nicole Arendt (Netherlands) Manon Bollegraf	4	4
4	(United States) Lindsay Davenport (United States) Mary Joe Fernández	6	6
9	(United States) Katrina Adams (South Africa) Mariaan de Swardt	4	2
6	(Switzerland) Martina Hingis (Czech Republic) Helena Suková	2	4
3	(United States) Meredith McGrath (Latvia) Larisa Neiland	6	6
(France) Alexandra Fusai (Argentina) Mercedes Paz	4	6	2
2	(United States) Gigi Fernández (Belarus) Natasha Zvereva	6	1	6

Semifinals
1	(Czech Republic) Jana Novotná (Spain) Arantxa Sánchez Vicario	2	2
4	(United States) Lindsay Davenport (United States) Mary Joe Fernández	6	6
3	(United States) Meredith McGrath (Latvia) Larisa Neiland	5	3
2	(United States) Gigi Fernández (Belarus) Natasha Zvereva	7	6

Final
4	(United States) Lindsay Davenport (United States) Mary Joe Fernández	6	6
2	(United States) Gigi Fernández (Belarus) Natasha Zvereva	2	1

=== Top half ===
==== Section 1 ====
First round
1	(Czech Republic) J Novotná (Spain) A Sánchez Vicario	6	6
(Netherlands) M Koutstaal (United Kingdom) V Lake	1	2
(Germany) S Meier (Slovakia) H Nagyová	6	7
(Canada) S Jeyaseelan (United States) L Poruri	4	5
(Australia) A Ellwood (South Africa) R Nideffer	6	6
(Romania) C Cristea (Federal Republic of Yugoslavia) T Ječmenica	3	2
(South Korea) S-h Park (Chinese Taipei) S-t Wang	7^{7}	6
16	(Belgium) E Callens (Belgium) L Courtois	6^{4}	2
14	(Indonesia) Y Basuki (Netherlands) C Vis	6	6
(Romania) R Dragomir (United States) A Grossman	4	1
WC	(France) K Quentrec-Eagle (France) A-G Sidot	6	6
(United States) A Lettiere (United States) C Morariu	3	2
(Czech Republic) P Langrová (Slovakia) R Zrubáková	6	4	6
(United States) E deLone (Australia) N Pratt	3	6	1
(Italy) S Cecchini (Italy) L Garrone	2	6^{3}
5	(United States) N Arendt (Netherlands) M Bollegraf	6	7^{7}

Second round
1	(Czech Republic) J Novotná (Spain) A Sánchez Vicario	6	6
(Germany) S Meier (Slovakia) H Nagyová	0	3
(Australia) A Ellwood (South Africa) R Nideffer	2	7	2
(South Korea) S-h Park (Chinese Taipei) S-t Wang	6	5	6
14	(Indonesia) Y Basuki (Netherlands) C Vis	6	6
WC	(France) K Quentrec-Eagle (France) A-G Sidot	4	4
(Czech Republic) P Langrová (Slovakia) R Zrubáková	6	3	4
5	(United States) N Arendt (Netherlands) M Bollegraf	3	6	6

Third round
1	(Czech Republic) J Novotná (Spain) A Sánchez Vicario	6	6
(South Korea) S-h Park (Chinese Taipei) S-t Wang	1	3
14	(Indonesia) Y Basuki (Netherlands) C Vis	4	5
5	(United States) N Arendt (Netherlands) M Bollegraf	6	7

Quarterfinals
1	(Czech Republic) J Novotná (Spain) A Sánchez Vicario	6	6
5	(United States) N Arendt (Netherlands) M Bollegraf	4	4

==== Section 2 ====
First round
4	(United States) L Davenport (United States) MJ Fernández	7^{7}	6
(Canada) J Hetherington (United States) K Rinaldy-Stunkel	6^{2}	4
(Netherlands) N Krijger-Jagerman (Netherlands) S Rottier	6	5	2
(Japan) K Nagatsuka (Japan) A Sugiyama	4	7	6
(Ukraine) O Lugina (Bulgaria) E Pampoulova	6	6
(Bulgaria) S Krivencheva (Czech Republic) E Martincová	4	3
(Czech Republic) E Melicharová (Czech Republic) H Vildová	0	2
11	(South Africa) A Coetzer (Netherlands) B Schultz-McCarthy	6	6
9	(United States) K Adams (South Africa) M de Swardt	6	6
WC	(France) I Demongeot (France) C Dhenin	4	1
(Poland) M Grzybowska (Poland) A Olsza	7	3	5
(Sweden) M Lindström (Sweden) M Strandlund	5	6	7
(United States) A Frazier (United States) K Po	3	6	6
(United States) M Werdel-Witmeyer (United States) T Whitlinger-Jones	6	3	4
(Australia) C Barclay (Australia) K Godridge	4	4
7	(United States) L Raymond (Australia) R Stubbs	6	6

Second round
4	(United States) L Davenport (United States) MJ Fernández	6	6
(Japan) K Nagatsuka (Japan) A Sugiyama	3	1
(Ukraine) O Lugina (Bulgaria) E Pampoulova	6	6^{3}	6
11	(South Africa) A Coetzer (Netherlands) B Schultz-McCarthy	4	7^{7}	3
9	(United States) K Adams (South Africa) M de Swardt	7	6
(Sweden) M Lindström (Sweden) M Strandlund	5	1
(United States) A Frazier (United States) K Po	3	4
7	(United States) L Raymond (Australia) R Stubbs	6	6

Third round
4	(United States) L Davenport (United States) MJ Fernández	6	6
(Ukraine) O Lugina (Bulgaria) E Pampoulova	2	1
9	(United States) K Adams (South Africa) M de Swardt	6	7
7	(United States) L Raymond (Australia) R Stubbs	3	5

Quarterfinals
4	(United States) L Davenport (United States) MJ Fernández	6	6
9	(United States) K Adams (South Africa) M de Swardt	4	2

=== Bottom half ===
==== Section 3 ====
First round
6	(Switzerland) M Hingis (Czech Republic) H Suková	6	6
(Austria) P Schwarz (Slovakia) K Studeníková	1	1
(Japan) R Hiraki (Japan) N Kijimuta	6	4	6
(Netherlands) P Kamstra (Slovenia) T Križan	1	6	0
(Argentina) L Montalvo (Argentina) P Suárez	0^{r}
(Italy) R Grande (Russia) E Likhovtseva	1
(Australia) E Smylie (United States) L Wild	4	6	6
13	(Italy) L Golarsa (Romania) I Spîrlea	6	3	4
12	(Spain) C Martínez (Argentina) P Tarabini	4	6	6
(Germany) W Probst (Germany) C Singer	6	1	1
(Slovakia) D Krajčovičová (Czech Republic) L Němečková	4	3
(Sweden) Å Carlsson (Hungary) A Temesvári	6	6
(Japan) N Miyagi (United States) S Reece	0	0
(Australia) K Radford (United States) S Stafford	6	6
(Belgium) S Appelmans (Netherlands) M Oremans	2	4
3	(United States) M McGrath (Latvia) L Neiland	6	6

Second round
6	(Switzerland) M Hingis (Czech Republic) H Suková	6	6
(Japan) R Hiraki (Japan) N Kijimuta	1	3
(Italy) R Grande (Russia) E Likhovtseva	7^{7}	3	1
(Australia) E Smylie (United States) L Wild	6^{5}	6	6
12	(Spain) C Martínez (Argentina) P Tarabini	6	5	6
(Sweden) Å Carlsson (Hungary) A Temesvári	3	7	3
(Australia) K Radford (United States) S Stafford	0	3
3	(United States) M McGrath (Latvia) L Neiland	6	6

Third round
6	(Switzerland) M Hingis (Czech Republic) H Suková	7^{9}	6
(Australia) E Smylie (United States) L Wild	6^{7}	2
12	(Spain) C Martínez (Argentina) P Tarabini	5	5
3	(United States) M McGrath (Latvia) L Neiland	7	7

Quarterfinals
6	(Switzerland) M Hingis (Czech Republic) H Suková	2	4
3	(United States) M McGrath (Latvia) L Neiland	6	6

==== Section 4 ====
First round
8	(France) J Halard-Decugis (France) N Tauziat	2	6	6
(Belgium) N Feber (Belgium) D van Roost	6	2	2
(United States) L Lee (Germany) C Schneider	1	6^{2}
(Finland) N Dahlman (United Kingdom) C Wood	6	7^{7}
(France) A Fusai (Argentina) M Paz	6	6
(Czech Republic) R Bobková (United States) D Graham	4	3
WC	(France) N Dechy (France) A Mauresmo	3	1
15	(France) A Dechaume-Balleret (France) S Testud	6	6
10	(Netherlands) K Boogert (Australia) N Bradtke	2	1
(Russia) E Makarova (Russia) E Maniokova	6	6
(Germany) K Kschwendt (Canada) R Simpson	6	4	0
(Australia) R McQuillan (Australia) L Pleming	4	6	6
WC	(France) L Ghirardi-Rubbi (France) S Pitkowski	6	7
(Greece) C Papadáki (Ukraine) E Tatarkova	3	5
(Australia) K-A Guse (Canada) P Hy-Boulais	0	2
2	(United States) G Fernández (Belarus) N Zvereva	6	6

Second round
8	(France) J Halard-Decugis (France) N Tauziat	5	6	7
(Finland) N Dahlman (United Kingdom) C Wood	7	1	5
(France) A Fusai (Argentina) M Paz	4	7	6
15	(France) A Dechaume-Balleret (France) S Testud	6	5	2
(Russia) E Makarova (Russia) E Maniokova	6^{2}	2
(Australia) R McQuillan (Australia) L Pleming	7^{7}	6
WC	(France) L Ghirardi-Rubbi (France) S Pitkowski	3	6	0
2	(United States) G Fernández (Belarus) N Zvereva	6	3	6

Third round
8	(France) J Halard-Decugis (France) N Tauziat	3	6	6
(France) A Fusai (Argentina) M Paz	6	3	8
(Australia) R McQuillan (Australia) L Pleming	1	6^{3}
2	(United States) G Fernández (Belarus) N Zvereva	6	7^{7}

Quarterfinals
(France) A Fusai (Argentina) M Paz	4	6	2
2	(United States) G Fernández (Belarus) N Zvereva	6	1	6
