= 1996 French Open – Men's doubles =

Men's doubles
- 1996 French Open

Final
- Champion: (Russia) Yevgeny Kafelnikov (Czech Republic) Daniel Vacek
- Runner-up: (France) Guy Forget (Switzerland) Jakob Hlasek
- Score: 6–2, 6–3

Details
- Draw: 64
- Seeds: 16

Events
Singles	men	women		boys	girls
Doubles	men	women	mixed	boys	girls
WC Singles	men	women	quad
WC Doubles	men	women	quad
Legends	−45	45+	women
- French Open

Yevgeny Kafelnikov and Daniel Vacek defeated Guy Forget and Jakob Hlasek in the final, 6–2, 6–3 to win the men's doubles tennis title at the 1996 French Open. As of 2025, Kafelnikov remains the most recent man to win both the singles and men's doubles events at the same edition of a major.

== Seeds ==
Champion seeds are indicated in bold text while text in italics indicates the round in which those seeds were eliminated.

1. (Australia) Todd Woodbridge / (Australia) Mark Woodforde (semifinals)
2. (The Bahamas) Mark Knowles / (Canada) Daniel Nestor (second round)
3. (Zimbabwe) Byron Black / (Canada) Grant Connell (second round)
4. (United States) Patrick Galbraith / (Russia) Andrei Olhovskiy (second round)
5. (France) Guy Forget / (Switzerland) Jakob Hlasek (final)
6. (South Africa) Ellis Ferreira / (Netherlands) Jan Siemerink (first round)
7. (Russia) **Yevgeny Kafelnikov** / (Czech Republic) **Daniel Vacek (champions)**
8. (Canada) Sébastien Lareau / (United States) Alex O'Brien (third round)
9. (Sweden) Jonas Björkman / (Sweden) Nicklas Kulti (quarterfinals)
10. (Argentina) Luis Lobo / (Spain) Javier Sánchez (third round)
11. (Belgium) Libor Pimek / (South Africa) Byron Talbot (quarterfinals)
12. (Spain) Tomás Carbonell / (Spain) Francisco Roig (first round)
13. (Netherlands) Hendrik Jan Davids / (Czech Republic) Cyril Suk (second round)
14. (Sweden) Stefan Edberg / (Czech Republic) Petr Korda (third round)
15. (Australia) Mark Philippoussis / (Australia) Patrick Rafter (third round)
16. (Czech Republic) Jiří Novák / (Czech Republic) David Rikl (first round)

== Draw ==
Key

- Q = Qualifier
- WC = Wild card
- LL = Lucky loser
- Alt = Alternate
- ITF = ITF entry
- PR = Protected ranking
- SR = Special ranking
- SE = Special exempt
- JE = Junior exempt
- JR = Junior Accelerator Programme entrant
- CO = College Accelerator Programme entrant
- NG = Next Gen Accelerator Program entrant
- w/o = Walkover
- r = Retired
- d = Defaulted

=== Finals ===
Quarterfinals
1	(Australia) Todd Woodbridge (Australia) Mark Woodforde	6	6
9	(Sweden) Jonas Björkman (Sweden) Nicklas Kulti	4	1
(Argentina) Javier Frana (United States) Rick Leach	2	2
5	(France) Guy Forget (Switzerland) Jakob Hlasek	6	6
11	(Belgium) Libor Pimek (South Africa) Byron Talbot	3	6	1
(United States) Jared Palmer (United States) Jonathan Stark	6	3	6
7	(Russia) Yevgeny Kafelnikov (Czech Republic) Daniel Vacek	6	7
(United States) Donald Johnson (United States) Francisco Montana	2	6^{8}

Semifinals
1	(Australia) Todd Woodbridge (Australia) Mark Woodforde	3	6	4
5	(France) Guy Forget (Switzerland) Jakob Hlasek	6	4	6
(United States) Jared Palmer (United States) Jonathan Stark	4	6^{4}
7	(Russia) Yevgeny Kafelnikov (Czech Republic) Daniel Vacek	6	7

Final
5	(France) Guy Forget (Switzerland) Jakob Hlasek	2	3
7	(Russia) Yevgeny Kafelnikov (Czech Republic) Daniel Vacek	6	6

=== Top half ===
==== Section 1 ====
First round
1	(Australia) T Woodbridge (Australia) M Woodforde	6	7
(South Africa) M Ondruska (Zimbabwe) K Ullyett	3	6^{1}
(Switzerland) L Manta (Czech Republic) P Vízner	6	7
(Australia) J Ireland (Italy) D Nargiso	4	5
(South Africa) D Adams (Australia) W Arthurs	6	3	8
(Netherlands) T Kempers (Netherlands) T Nijssen	3	6	6
15	(Australia) M Philippoussis (Australia) P Rafter	6	7
(United States) B MacPhie (Australia) M Tebbutt	4	6^{4}
9	(Sweden) J Björkman (Sweden) N Kulti	6	6
(France) L Barthez (France) G Bastié	2	3
(South Africa) B Haygarth (South Africa) C van Rensburg	6	7
(Australia) P Kilderry (Australia) P Tramacchi	2	6^{2}
(Netherlands) R Krajicek (Netherlands) M Oosting	3	7	6
(Sweden) R Bergh (United States) S Cannon	6	6^{2}	4
8	(Canada) S Lareau (United States) A O'Brien	4	6	6
(Ecuador) N Lapentti (Venezuela) N Pereira	6	1	3

Second round
1	(Australia) T Woodbridge (Australia) M Woodforde	6	6
(Switzerland) L Manta (Czech Republic) P Vízner	1	2
(South Africa) D Adams (Australia) W Arthurs	6^{4}	6^{9}
15	(Australia) M Philippoussis (Australia) P Rafter	7	7
9	(Sweden) J Björkman (Sweden) N Kulti	6	6
(South Africa) B Haygarth (South Africa) C van Rensburg	2	4
(Netherlands) R Krajicek (Netherlands) M Oosting	5	3
8	(Canada) S Lareau (United States) A O'Brien	7	6

Third round
1	(Australia) T Woodbridge (Australia) M Woodforde	6	7
15	(Australia) M Philippoussis (Australia) P Rafter	4	6^{9}
9	(Sweden) J Björkman (Sweden) N Kulti	6	4	6
8	(Canada) S Lareau (United States) A O'Brien	3	6	3

Quarterfinals
1	(Australia) T Woodbridge (Australia) M Woodforde	6	6
9	(Sweden) J Björkman (Sweden) N Kulti	4	1

==== Section 2 ====
First round
4	(United States) P Galbraith (Russia) A Olhovskiy	1	7	6
(Australia) J Eagle (Australia) A Florent	6	6^{5}	4
(Argentina) J Frana (United States) R Leach	6	5	7
(Argentina) P Albano (Spain) J-A Conde	3	7	5
(United States) S Davis (United Kingdom) T Henman	6	6
(South Africa) M Barnard (United States) G Van Emburgh	3	2
13	(Netherlands) HJ Davids (Czech Republic) C Suk	7	7
(Sweden) D Ekerot (Hungary) L Markovits	6^{3}	6^{5}
(Germany) P Kühnen (South Africa) G Muller	7	7
12	(Spain) T Carbonell (Spain) F Roig	5	6^{6}
(United States) J Grabb (United States) R Reneberg	6	6
(Germany) M-K Goellner (Germany) D Prinosil	3	4
(Czech Republic) K Nováček (United States) V Spadea	6	6
(France) J-F Bachelot (France) G Carraz	2	3
5	(France) G Forget (Switzerland) J Hlasek	3	6	6
(Zimbabwe) W Black (United States) J Waite	6	3	3

Second round
4	(United States) P Galbraith (Russia) A Olhovskiy	6^{3}	4
(Argentina) J Frana (United States) R Leach	7	6
(United States) S Davis (United Kingdom) T Henman	6	7
13	(Netherlands) HJ Davids (Czech Republic) C Suk	3	6^{4}
(Germany) P Kühnen (South Africa) G Muller	7	3	3
(United States) J Grabb (United States) R Reneberg	6^{4}	6	6
(Czech Republic) K Nováček (United States) V Spadea	6	3	2
5	(France) G Forget (Switzerland) J Hlasek	4	6	6

Third round
(Argentina) J Frana (United States) R Leach	7	6
(United States) S Davis (United Kingdom) T Henman	5	3
(United States) J Grabb (United States) R Reneberg	1	4
5	(France) G Forget (Switzerland) J Hlasek	6	6

Quarterfinals
(Argentina) J Frana (United States) R Leach	2	2
5	(France) G Forget (Switzerland) J Hlasek	6	6

=== Bottom half ===
==== Section 3 ====
First round
(United States) T Kronemann (Australia) D Macpherson	6^{8}	7	7
6	(South Africa) E Ferreira (Netherlands) J Siemerink	7	6^{6}	5
(Netherlands) P Haarhuis (Netherlands) S Schalken	4	7	6
(United States) K Kinnear (United States) D Randall	6	6^{4}	4
(Spain) J Arrese (Italy) S Pescosolido	6	6
(United States) L Jensen (United States) M Jensen	4	4
11	(Belgium) L Pimek (South Africa) B Talbot	6	6
(South Africa) J-L de Jager (Sweden) M Larsson	4	4
14	(Sweden) S Edberg (Czech Republic) P Korda	6	6
(New Zealand) B Steven (United States) K Thorne	3	4
(France) J-P Fleurian (France) G Raoux	6	6
(France) R Gilbert (France) S Simian	3	4
(United States) J Palmer (United States) J Stark	6	7
(United States) B Behrens (United States) M Lucena	3	6^{8}
3	(Zimbabwe) B Black (Canada) G Connell	6	6
(Hungary) G Köves (United Kingdom) A Richardson	1	4

Second round
(United States) T Kronemann (Australia) D Macpherson	6	4	6
(Netherlands) P Haarhuis (Netherlands) S Schalken	3	6	1
(Spain) J Arrese (Italy) S Pescosolido	4	3
11	(Belgium) L Pimek (South Africa) B Talbot	6	6
14	(Sweden) S Edberg (Czech Republic) P Korda	6	7
(France) J-P Fleurian (France) G Raoux	3	5
(United States) J Palmer (United States) J Stark	7	7
3	(Zimbabwe) B Black (Canada) G Connell	6^{5}	5

Third round
(United States) T Kronemann (Australia) D Macpherson	4	6^{3}
11	(Belgium) L Pimek (South Africa) B Talbot	6	7
14	(Sweden) S Edberg (Czech Republic) P Korda	4	6	5
(United States) J Palmer (United States) J Stark	6	4	7

Quarterfinals
11	(Belgium) L Pimek (South Africa) B Talbot	3	6	1
(United States) J Palmer (United States) J Stark	6	3	6

==== Section 4 ====
First round
7	(Russia) Y Kafelnikov (Czech Republic) D Vacek	6	6
(France) J Golmard (France) L Roux	0	3
(United States) K Jones (United States) C Woodruff	3	0
(United States) M Keil (Sweden) P Nyborg	0	0R
(France) O Delaître (United States) J Tarango	7	4	6
(France) H Leconte (France) Y Noah	6^{4}	6	2
10	(Argentina) L Lobo (Spain) J Sánchez	6	6
(France) S Grosjean (France) O Mutis	3	4
(Australia) S Stolle (Australia) J Stoltenberg	6	6
16	(Czech Republic) J Novák (Czech Republic) D Rikl	1	4
(South Africa) L Bale (Netherlands) S Noteboom	7	6
(United States) K Flach (United States) D Wheaton	6^{4}	4
(United States) D Johnson (United States) F Montana	6	1	6
(France) A Boetsch (Switzerland) M Rosset	2	6	3
2	(The Bahamas) M Knowles (Canada) D Nestor	2	7	6
(United Kingdom) N Broad (South Africa) P Norval	6	6^{2}	2

Second round
7	(Russia) Y Kafelnikov (Czech Republic) D Vacek	6	6
(United States) K Jones (United States) C Woodruff	3	4
(France) O Delaître (United States) J Tarango	2	6	3
10	(Argentina) L Lobo (Spain) J Sánchez	6	3	6
(Australia) S Stolle (Australia) J Stoltenberg	3	6^{6}
(South Africa) L Bale (Netherlands) S Noteboom	6	7
(United States) D Johnson (United States) F Montana	3	7	6
2	(The Bahamas) M Knowles (Canada) D Nestor	6	5	3

Third round
7	(Russia) Y Kafelnikov (Czech Republic) D Vacek	7	7
10	(Argentina) L Lobo (Spain) J Sánchez	6^{8}	5
(South Africa) L Bale (Netherlands) S Noteboom	4	6^{5}
(United States) D Johnson (United States) F Montana	6	7

Quarterfinals
7	(Russia) Y Kafelnikov (Czech Republic) D Vacek	6	7
(United States) D Johnson (United States) F Montana	2	6^{8}
