= On the Line: The Richard Williams Story =

On The Line: The Richard Williams Story
- Theatrical release poster by Akiko Stehrenberger
- Directed by: Stuart McClave
- Written by: Stuart McClave
- Produced by: Chavoita LeSane; Gary Ousdahl; Duncan Montgomery; Jack Selby; Stuart McClave
- Starring: Richard Williams (tennis coach); Billie Jean King; Katrina Adams; Pam Shriver; Dr. Dale G. Caldwell; Rick Macci; Venus Williams; Oracene Price; Serena Williams
- Cinematography: Kadri Koop
- Edited by: Neil Meiklejohn; Nick Garnham Wright
- Music by: Katy Jarzebowski
- Production companies: Fremantle (company); McClave Lumber Company; Bright West Entertainment; ChaVam; High Frequency Entertainment; Foundation 360
- Distributed by: Fremantle (company)
- Release date: June 12, 2022 (Tribeca Film Festival)
- Running time: 93 minutes
- Country: United States
- Language: English

On The Line: The Richard Williams Story is a 2022 American documentary film, written and directed by Stuart McClave. It profiles the famous tennis patriarch Richard Williams, the father and coach of Venus Williams and Serena Williams.

== Cast ==
- Richard Williams (tennis coach)
- Billie Jean King
- Pam Shriver
- Brad Gilbert
- Katrina Adams
- Rick Macci
- Serena Williams
- Venus Williams
- Oracene Price
- Dale Caldwell

== Synopsis ==
The film opens with rare family footage in which Richard Williams asks his young daughters Venus and Serena Williams, years before they would become successful tennis players, if they feel a part of the ghetto, and what they like about it.

It then chronicles their rise from mastering tennis on the public courts of Compton, California around gang members to the family gate-crashing the ethnically homogeneous sport of tennis and rising through the rankings.

The film showcases the 1994 Bank of the West Classic, which served as Venus Williams's professional tour debut, and the controversial 2001 Indian Wells Masters tournament, which in the wake of Venus's semi-final withdrawal with right knee tendinitis, saw Richard Williams being subjected to racist slurs following accusations of match fixing and an American crowd booing Serena Williams when she faced off against the Belgian tennis player Kim Clijsters for the title.

In present day, Richard Williams visits his hometown of Shreveport, Louisiana, where he recounts childhood memories growing up in the highly segregated South during the Jim Crow laws and being raised by a single mother of five children who picked cotton. He also reunites with tennis coach Rick Macci after nearly 30 years, following Richard firing Rick as Venus's professional tennis coach in 1994.

== Production ==
Director Stuart McClave read an article in 2019 that detailed Richard Williams' challenging upbringing in Shreveport, Louisiana and the racism he experienced at the hands of the Ku Klux Klan. Afterward, McClave arranged to meet Williams at his home in West Palm Beach, Florida, where they discussed his life story, the history of tennis, and how the sport changed once the Williams family rose to prominence. During these conversations, Williams asked McClave to help him tell his story in his own words.

McClave has described the history of the Williams family as "one of the most inspirational American stories of all time."

Production began in late summer 2021 and finished in early 2022.

== Release ==
The film had its world premiere at the Tribeca Film Festival on June 12, 2022 and premiered internationally at the Sheffield DocFest on June 17, 2023.

It has been released by Sky UK in the UK, Croatia, and Italy; Network 10 and Paramount+ in Australia; M-Net in South Africa; Canal + in France, Austria, Poland, and in the Czech Republic; Canadian Broadcasting Corporation in Canada; and by TVNZ in New Zealand.

== Reception ==
The Guardian praised the film for being much more than just a story about "two gifted tennis players and their ambitious father," but rather a "fascinating" retelling of the "history of American racism."

Golden Globe Awards called it "a sweeping cultural reassessment" that explores "not merely athletic accomplishment, but chiefly the contours of the modern African American experience" and praised the filmmakers for "breathing life into its subject in a way that not even King Richard was able to accomplish."

Variety wrote that the film "examines the Black experience in America, and reflects the resilience and determination required by the family to prove their skeptics wrong."

Lisa Kennedy, in her review of the film, commended the film for doing "a good job interrogating the media and commentators" and "answering the question the white tennis world was collectively asking, 'Who is this guy?'" but highlighted that the film and Richard Williams did not give enough credit to the contributions of Arthur Ashe and Althea Gibson.

Jo-Wilfried Tsonga, a former ATP Top 5 professional tennis player, described the documentary as "the best I have seen in my sport."

The theatrical poster, designed by Akiko Stehrenberger, was featured by Creative Review and Mubi in their top movie posters of the year list.
