= Detroit Film Critics Society =

Organization of film critics based in Detroit, Michigan, United States

The Detroit Film Critics Society (DFCS) is a film critic organization based in Detroit, Michigan, United States. It was founded in 2007, and includes a group of over twenty film critics. To become a member, the critic must have reviewed at least twelve films a year in an established publication, with no more than two different critics per publication admitted. It presents annual awards at the end of the year, for the best films of the preceding year.

== Categories ==
- Best Film
- Best Director
- Best Actor
- Best Actress
- Best Supporting Actor
- Best Supporting Actress
- Best Ensemble
- Best Screenplay
- Breakthrough Performance
- Best Documentary
- Best Animated Feature
- Best Use of Music

== 2007 ==
=== Best Film ===
No Country for Old Men

- The Diving Bell and the Butterfly
- Juno
- Into the Wild
- There Will Be Blood

=== Best Director ===
Joel Coen and Ethan Coen – No Country for Old Men

- Paul Thomas Anderson – There Will Be Blood
- Tim Burton – Sweeney Todd: The Demon Barber of Fleet Street
- Sean Penn – Into the Wild
- Jason Reitman – Juno
- Julian Schnabel – The Diving Bell and the Butterfly

=== Best Actor ===
George Clooney – Michael Clayton as Michael Clayton

- Mathieu Amalric – The Diving Bell and the Butterfly as Jean-Dominique Bauby
- Daniel Day-Lewis – There Will Be Blood as Daniel Plainview
- Emile Hirsch – Into the Wild as Christopher McCandless / Alexander Supertramp
- Tommy Lee Jones – No Country for Old Men Sheriff Ed Tom Bell

=== Best Actress ===
Elliot Page – Juno as Juno MacGuff

- Amy Adams – Enchanted as Princess Giselle
- Julie Christie – Away from Her as Fiona Anderson
- Marion Cotillard – La Vie en rose as Édith Piaf
- Laura Linney – The Savages as Wendy Savage

=== Best Supporting Actor ===
Javier Bardem – No Country for Old Men as Anton Chigurh

- Casey Affleck – The Assassination of Jesse James by the Coward Robert Ford as Robert Ford
- Paul Dano – There Will Be Blood as Paul Sunday / Eli Sunday
- Hal Holbrook – Into the Wild as Ron Franz
- Tom Wilkinson – Michael Clayton as Arthur Edens

=== Best Supporting Actress ===
Tilda Swinton – Michael Clayton as Karen Crowder

- Cate Blanchett – I'm Not There as Jude Quinn
- Catherine Keener – Into the Wild as Jan Burres
- Emily Mortimer – Lars and the Real Girl as Karin
- Amy Ryan – Gone Baby Gone as Helene McCready

=== Best Cast ===
Juno

- Before the Devil Knows You're Dead
- Lars and the Real Girl
- Waitress
- Zodiac

=== Best Newcomer ===
Diablo Cody – Juno

- Nikki Blonsky – Hairspray
- Michael Cera – Juno and Superbad
- Sarah Polley – Away from Her
- Adrienne Shelly – Waitress

== 2008 ==
=== Best Film ===
Slumdog Millionaire

- The Dark Knight
- Frost/Nixon
- WALL-E
- The Wrestler

=== Best Director ===
Danny Boyle – Slumdog Millionaire

- Darren Aronofsky – The Wrestler
- Ron Howard – Frost/Nixon
- Christopher Nolan – The Dark Knight
- Andrew Stanton – WALL-E

=== Best Actor ===
Mickey Rourke – The Wrestler as Randy "The Ram" Robinson

- Josh Brolin – W. as George W. Bush
- Leonardo DiCaprio – Revolutionary Road as Frank Wheeler
- Frank Langella – Frost/Nixon as Richard Nixon
- Sean Penn – Milk as Harvey Milk

=== Best Actress ===
Kate Winslet – Revolutionary Road as April Wheeler

- Anne Hathaway – Rachel Getting Married as Kym Buchman
- Sally Hawkins – Happy-Go-Lucky as Pauline "Poppy" Cross
- Melissa Leo – Frozen River as Ray Eddy
- Meryl Streep – Doubt as Sister Aloysius Beauvier

=== Best Supporting Actor ===
Heath Ledger – The Dark Knight as The Joker

- Robert Downey Jr. – Tropic Thunder as Kirk Lazarus
- James Franco – Pineapple Express as Saul Silver
- Eddie Marsan – Happy-Go-Lucky as Scott
- Michael Shannon – Revolutionary Road as John Givings, Jr.

=== Best Supporting Actress ===
Marisa Tomei – The Wrestler as Pam / Cassidy

- Amy Adams – Doubt as Sister James
- Elizabeth Banks – W. as Laura Bush
- Penélope Cruz – Vicky Cristina Barcelona as María Elena
- Rosemarie DeWitt – Rachel Getting Married as Rachel Buchman

=== Best Cast ===
Frost/Nixon

- Burn After Reading
- Rachel Getting Married
- Revolutionary Road
- Tropic Thunder

=== Best Newcomer ===
Martin McDonagh – In Bruges

- Rosemarie DeWitt – Rachel Getting Married as Rachel Buchman
- Rebecca Hall – Frost/Nixon and Vicky Cristina Barcelona as Caroline Cushing and Vicky
- Danny McBride – Pineapple Express as Red
- Dev Patel – Slumdog Millionaire as Jamal Malik
- Catinca Untaru – The Fall as Alexandria

== 2009 ==
=== Best Film ===
Up

- (500) Days of Summer
- The Hurt Locker
- Inglourious Basterds
- Up in the Air

=== Best Director ===
Pete Docter – Up

- Kathryn Bigelow – The Hurt Locker
- Jason Reitman – Up in the Air
- Quentin Tarantino – Inglourious Basterds
- Marc Webb – (500) Days of Summer

=== Best Actor ===
Colin Firth – A Single Man George Falconer

- George Clooney – Up in the Air as Ryan Bingham
- Matt Damon – The Informant! as Mark Whitacre
- Joseph Gordon-Levitt – (500) Days of Summer as Tom Hansen
- Sam Rockwell – Moon as Sam Bell

=== Best Actress ===
Gabourey Sidibe – Precious as Claireece "Precious" Jones

- Alison Lohman – Drag Me to Hell as Christine Brown
- Carey Mulligan – An Education as Jenny Melor
- Saoirse Ronan – The Lovely Bones as Susie Salmon
- Meryl Streep – Julie & Julia as Julia Child

=== Best Supporting Actor ===
Christoph Waltz – Inglourious Basterds as Col. Hans Landa

- Woody Harrelson – The Messenger as Capt. Tony Stone
- Woody Harrelson – Zombieland as Tallahassee
- Christian McKay – Me and Orson Welles as Orson Welles
- Stanley Tucci – The Lovely Bones as George Harvey

=== Best Supporting Actress ===
Mo'Nique – Precious as Mary Lee Johnston

- Marion Cotillard – Nine as Luisa Contini
- Vera Farmiga – Up in the Air as Alex Goran
- Anna Kendrick – Up in the Air as Natalie Keener
- Mélanie Laurent – Inglourious Basterds as Shosanna Dreyfuss

=== Best Ensemble ===
The Hangover

- Inglourious Basterds
- Precious
- Star Trek
- Zombieland

=== Breakthrough Performance ===
Gabourey Sidibe – Precious as Claireece "Precious" Jones

- Anna Kendrick – Up in the Air as Natalie Keener
- Christian McKay – Me and Orson Welles as Orson Welles
- Carey Mulligan – An Education as Jenny Mellor
- Chris Pine – Star Trek as James T. Kirk
- Christoph Waltz – Inglourious Basterds as Col. Hans Landa

== 2010 ==
=== Best Film ===
- The Social Network
- 127 Hours
- Inception
- The King's Speech
- Winter's Bone

=== Best Director ===
Danny Boyle – 127 Hours

- David Fincher – The Social Network
- Debra Granik – Winter's Bone
- Tom Hooper – The King's Speech
- Christopher Nolan – Inception
- Edgar Wright – Scott Pilgrim vs. the World

=== Best Actor ===
Colin Firth – The King's Speech as George VI

- Jeff Bridges – True Grit as Reuben "Rooster" Cogburn
- Jesse Eisenberg – The Social Network as Mark Zuckerberg
- James Franco – 127 Hours as Aron Ralston
- Ryan Gosling – Blue Valentine as Dean Pereira

=== Best Actress ===
Jennifer Lawrence – Winter's Bone as Ree Dolly

- Nicole Kidman – Rabbit Hole as Becca Corbett
- Carey Mulligan – Never Let Me Go as Kathy H
- Natalie Portman – Black Swan as Nina Sayers
- Michelle Williams – Blue Valentine as Cynthia "Cindy" Heller

=== Best Supporting Actor ===
Christian Bale – The Fighter as Dickie Eklund

- Andrew Garfield – The Social Network as Eduardo Saverin
- John Hawkes – Winter's Bone as Teardop Dolly
- Sam Rockwell – Conviction as Kenny Waters
- Mark Ruffalo – The Kids Are All Right as Paul Hatfield
- Geoffrey Rush – The King's Speech as Lionel Logue

=== Best Supporting Actress ===
Amy Adams – The Fighter as Charlene Fleming

- Helena Bonham Carter – The King's Speech as Queen Elizabeth
- Greta Gerwig – Greenberg as Florence Marr
- Melissa Leo – The Fighter as Alice Eklund
- Jacki Weaver – Animal Kingdom as Janine "Smurf" Cody

=== Best Ensemble ===
Winter's Bone

- The Fighter
- The Kids Are All Right
- The King's Speech
- Scott Pilgrim vs. the World

=== Breakthrough Performance ===
Jennifer Lawrence – Winter's Bone as Ree Dolly

- Andrew Garfield – The Social Network and Never Let Me Go as Eduardo Saverin and Tommy
- Greta Gerwig – Greenberg as Florence Marr
- Chloë Grace Moretz – Kick-Ass and Let Me In as Hit-Girl and Abby
- Mia Wasikowska – The Kids Are All Right as Joni Allgood

== 2011 ==
=== Best Film ===
The Artist

- The Descendants
- Hugo
- Take Shelter
- The Tree of Life

=== Best Director ===
Michel Hazanavicius – The Artist

- Terrence Malick – The Tree of Life
- Jeff Nichols – Take Shelter
- Martin Scorsese – Hugo
- Nicolas Winding Refn – Drive

=== Best Actor ===
Michael Fassbender – Shame as Brandon Sullivan

- George Clooney – The Descendants as Matt King
- Jean Dujardin – The Artist as George Valentin
- Brad Pitt – Moneyball as Billy Beane
- Michael Shannon – Take Shelter as Curtis LaForche

=== Best Actress ===
Michelle Williams – My Week with Marilyn as Marilyn Monroe

- Viola Davis – The Help as Aibileen Clark
- Felicity Jones – Like Crazy as Anna Maria Gardner
- Meryl Streep – The Iron Lady as Margaret Thatcher
- Charlize Theron – Young Adult as Mavis Gary

=== Best Supporting Actor ===
Christopher Plummer – Beginners as Hal Fields

- Kenneth Branagh – My Week with Marilyn as Laurence Olivier
- Albert Brooks – Drive as Bernie Rose
- Ryan Gosling – Crazy, Stupid, Love as Jacob Palmer
- Patton Oswalt – Young Adult as Matt Freehauf

=== Best Supporting Actress ===
Carey Mulligan – Shame as Sissy Sullivan

- Bérénice Bejo – The Artist as Peppy Miller
- Jessica Chastain – Take Shelter as Samantha LaForche
- Vanessa Redgrave – Coriolanus as Volumnia
- Octavia Spencer – The Help as Minny Jackson

=== Best Ensemble ===
Carnage

- Cedar Rapids
- Crazy, Stupid, Love
- The Help
- Margin Call
- Win Win

=== Breakthrough Performance ===
Jessica Chastain – The Help, Take Shelter and The Tree of Life as Celia Foote, Samantha LaForche, and Mrs. O’Brien

- Felicity Jones – Like Crazy as Anna Maria Gardner
- Melissa McCarthy – Bridesmaids as Megan Price
- Elizabeth Olsen – Martha Marcy May Marlene as Martha
- Shailene Woodley – The Descendants as Alexandra King

=== Best Screenplay ===
Moneyball – Steven Zaillian and Aaron Sorkin

- 50/50 – Will Reiser
- The Artist – Michel Hazanavicius
- Beginners – Mike Mills
- Take Shelter – Jeff Nichols

=== Best Documentary Film ===
Tabloid

- Into Eternity
- Into the Abyss
- Marwencol
- We Were Here

== 2012 ==
=== Best Film ===
Silver Linings Playbook

- Argo
- The Impossible
- Take This Waltz
- Zero Dark Thirty

=== Best Director ===
David O. Russell – Silver Linings Playbook

- Ben Affleck – Argo
- J. A. Bayona – The Impossible
- Kathryn Bigelow – Zero Dark Thirty
- Sarah Polley – Take This Waltz

=== Best Actor ===
Daniel Day-Lewis – Lincoln as Abraham Lincoln

- Bradley Cooper – Silver Linings Playbook as Patrick "Pat" Solatano, Jr.
- John Hawkes – The Sessions as Mark O'Brien
- Bill Murray – Hyde Park on Hudson as Franklin D. Roosevelt
- Joaquin Phoenix – The Master as Freddie Quell

=== Best Actress ===
Jennifer Lawrence – Silver Linings Playbook as Tiffany Maxwell

- Jessica Chastain – Zero Dark Thirty as Maya
- Greta Gerwig – Damsels in Distress as Violet
- Naomi Watts – The Impossible as Maria Bennett
- Michelle Williams – Take This Waltz as Margot

=== Best Supporting Actor ===
Robert De Niro – Silver Linings Playbook as Patrizio "Pat" Solitano, Sr.

- Philip Seymour Hoffman – The Master as Lancaster Dodd
- Tommy Lee Jones – Lincoln as Thaddeus Stevens
- Matthew McConaughey – Magic Mike as Dallas
- Ewan McGregor – The Impossible as Henry Bennett
- Ezra Miller – The Perks of Being a Wallflower as Patrick

=== Best Supporting Actress ===
Anne Hathaway – Les Misérables as Fantine

- Amy Adams – The Master as Peggy Dodd
- Ann Dowd – Compliance as Sandra
- Sally Field – Lincoln as Mary Todd Lincoln
- Helen Hunt – The Sessions as Cheryl Cohen-Greene

=== Best Ensemble ===
Lincoln

- Argo
- The Avengers
- Moonrise Kingdom
- Silver Linings Playbook

=== Breakthrough Performance ===
Zoe Kazan – Ruby Sparks

- Stephen Chbosky – The Perks of Being a Wallflower
- Rebel Wilson – Pitch Perfect
- Benh Zeitlin – Beasts of the Southern Wild
- Craig Zobel – Compliance

=== Best Screenplay ===
Silver Linings Playbook – David O. Russell

- The Cabin in the Woods – Joss Whedon and Drew Goddard
- Lincoln – Tony Kushner
- The Perks of Being a Wallflower – Stephen Chbosky
- Take This Waltz – Sarah Polley
- The House I Live In
- The Impos

== 2013 ==
=== Best Film ===
Her

- 12 Years a Slave
- Before Midnight
- Gravity
- Short Term 12

=== Best Director ===
Alfonso Cuarón – Gravity

- Paul Greengrass – Captain Phillips
- Spike Jonze – Her
- David O. Russell – American Hustle
- Martin Scorsese – The Wolf of Wall Street

=== Best Actor ===
Matthew McConaughey – Dallas Buyers Club as Ron Woodroof

- Leonardo DiCaprio – The Wolf of Wall Street as Jordan Belfort
- Chiwetel Ejiofor – 12 Years a Slave as Solomon Northup
- Tom Hanks – Captain Phillips as Captain Richard Phillips
- Robert Redford – All Is Lost as Our Man

=== Best Actress ===
Brie Larson – Short Term 12 as Grace

- Amy Adams – American Hustle as Sydney Prosser / Lady Edith Greensly (based on Evelyn Knight)
- Julie Delpy – Before Midnight as Céline
- Adèle Exarchopoulos – Blue Is the Warmest Colour as Adèle
- Meryl Streep – August: Osage County as Violet Weston

=== Best Supporting Actor ===
Jared Leto – Dallas Buyers Club as Rayon

- Barkhad Abdi – Captain Phillips as Abduwali Muse
- James Franco – Spring Breakers as Alien
- Matthew McConaughey – Mud as Mud
- Stanley Tucci – The Hunger Games: Catching Fire as Caesar Flickerman

=== Best Supporting Actress ===
Scarlett Johansson – Her as Samantha (voice)

- Jennifer Lawrence – American Hustle as Rosalyn Rosenfeld (based on Cynthia Marie Weinberg)
- Lupita Nyong'o – 12 Years a Slave as Patsey
- Julia Roberts – August: Osage County as Barbara Weston-Fordham
- June Squibb – Nebraska as Kate Grant

=== Best Ensemble ===
American Hustle

- 12 Years a Slave
- August: Osage County
- Blue Jasmine
- The Wolf of Wall Street

=== Breakthrough Performance ===
Brie Larson – Short Term 12 (actress)

- Lake Bell – In a World (actress, screenplay, director)
- Ryan Coogler – Fruitvale Station (screenplay, director)
- Destin Cretton – Short Term 12 (screenplay, director)
- Michael B. Jordan – Fruitvale Station (actor)

=== Best Screenplay ===
Spike Jonze – Her

- Destin Cretton – Short Term 12
- Richard Linklater, Julie Delpy, and Ethan Hawke – Before Midnight
- David O. Russell and Eric Warren Singer – American Hustle
- Terence Winter – The Wolf of Wall Street

=== Best Documentary Film ===
Stories We Tell

- Blackfish
- The Act of Killing
- The Square
- The Unknown Known

== 2014 ==
=== Best Film ===
Boyhood

- Birdman
- The Grand Budapest Hotel
- Under the Skin
- Whiplash

=== Best Director ===
Richard Linklater – Boyhood

- Wes Anderson – The Grand Budapest Hotel
- Damien Chazelle – Whiplash
- Jonathan Glazer – Under the Skin
- Alejandro G. Iñárritu – Birdman

=== Best Actor ===
Michael Keaton – Birdman as Riggan Thomson

- Benedict Cumberbatch – The Imitation Game as Alan Turing
- Brendan Gleeson – Calvary as Father James
- Jake Gyllenhaal – Nightcrawler as Louis "Lou" Bloom
- Tom Hardy – Locke as Ivan Locke
- Eddie Redmayne – The Theory of Everything as Stephen Hawking

=== Best Actress ===
Rosamund Pike – Gone Girl as Amy Elliott-Dunne

- Essie Davis – The Babadook as Amelia
- Scarlett Johansson – Under the Skin as The Female
- Julianne Moore – Still Alice as Dr. Alice Howland
- Reese Witherspoon – Wild as Cheryl Strayed

=== Best Supporting Actor ===
J. K. Simmons – Whiplash as Terence Fletcher

- Josh Brolin – Inherent Vice as Lt. Det. Christian "Bigfoot" Bjornsen
- Ethan Hawke – Boyhood as Mason Evans, Sr.
- Edward Norton – Birdman as Mike Shiner
- Mark Ruffalo – Foxcatcher as Dave Schultz

=== Best Supporting Actress ===
Patricia Arquette – Boyhood as Olivia Evans

- Laura Dern – Wild as Barbara "Bobbi" Grey
- Rene Russo – Nightcrawler as Nina Romina
- Emma Stone – Birdman as Sam Thomson
- Tilda Swinton – Snowpiercer as Deputy-Minister Mason

=== Best Ensemble ===
Birdman or (The Unexpected Virtue of Ignorance) (TIE)
The Grand Budapest Hotel (TIE)
Guardians of the Galaxy (TIE)

- Boyhood
- Into the Woods

=== Breakthrough Performance ===
Damien Chazelle – Whiplash (director, screenplay)

- Jennifer Kent – The Babadook (director, screenplay)
- Gugu Mbatha-Raw – Belle, Beyond the Lights (actress)
- Chris Pratt – Guardians of the Galaxy (actor)
- Dan Stevens – The Guest (actor)

=== Best Screenplay ===
Richard Linklater – Boyhood

- Wes Anderson – The Grand Budapest Hotel
- Damien Chazelle – Whiplash
- Alejandro G. Iñárritu, Nicolás Giacobone, Alexander Dinelaris Jr., and Armando Bó – Birdman
- John Michael McDonagh – Calvary

=== Best Documentary ===
Citizenfour

- Finding Vivian Maier
- Jodorowsky’s Dune
- Keep On Keepin’ On
- Life Itself

== 2015 ==
=== Best Film ===
Spotlight

- Brooklyn
- Inside Out
- Mad Max: Fury Road
- The Revenant
- Sicario
- Youth

=== Best Director ===
George Miller – Mad Max: Fury Road

- John Crowley – Brooklyn
- Alejandro G. Iñárritu – The Revenant
- Tom McCarthy – Spotlight
- Paolo Sorrentino – Youth

=== Best Actor ===
Michael Caine – Youth as Fred Ballinger

- Christopher Abbott – James White as James White
- Leonardo DiCaprio – The Revenant as Hugh Glass
- Michael Fassbender – Steve Jobs as Steve Jobs
- Tom Hardy – Legend as Ronnie and Reggie Kray

=== Best Actress ===
Saoirse Ronan – Brooklyn as Eilis Lacey

- Cate Blanchett – Carol as Carol Aird
- Brie Larson – Room as Joy 'Ma' Newsome
- Jennifer Lawrence – Joy as Joy Mangano
- Bel Powley – The Diary of a Teenage Girl as Minnie Goetze

=== Best Supporting Actor ===
Liev Schreiber – Spotlight as Martin Baron

- Paul Dano – Love & Mercy as Brian Wilson
- Benicio del Toro – Sicario as Alejandro Gillick
- Oscar Isaac – Ex Machina as Nathan Bateman
- Jacob Tremblay – Room as Jack Newsome

=== Best Supporting Actress ===
Alicia Vikander – The Danish Girl as Gerda Wegener

- Jennifer Jason Leigh – The Hateful Eight as Daisy Domergue
- Cynthia Nixon – James White as Gail White
- Kristen Stewart – Clouds of Sils Maria as Valentine
- Alicia Vikander – Ex Machina as Ava

=== Best Ensemble ===
Spotlight

- The Big Short
- The Hateful Eight
- Inside Out
- Joy

=== Breakthrough Performance ===
Alicia Vikander – The Danish Girl and Ex Machina

- Sean Baker – Tangerine (director, screenplay)
- Emory Cohen – Brooklyn (actor)
- Bel Powley – The Diary of a Teenage Girl (actress)
- Jacob Tremblay – Room (actor)

=== Best Screenplay ===
Tom McCarthy and Josh Singer – Spotlight

- Pete Docter, Meg LeFauve, and Josh Cooley – Inside Out
- Nick Hornby – Brooklyn
- Adam McKay and Charles Randolph – The Big Short
- Quentin Tarantino – The Hateful Eight

=== Best Documentary ===
Amy

- Best of Enemies
- Going Clear: Scientology and the Prison of Belief
- Listen to Me Marlon
- The Look of Silence

== 2016 ==
=== Best Film ===
La La Land

- The Edge of Seventeen
- Hell or High Water
- Manchester by the Sea
- Moonlight

=== Best Director ===
Damien Chazelle – La La Land

- Barry Jenkins – Moonlight
- Kenneth Lonergan – Manchester by the Sea
- David Mackenzie – Hell or High Water
- Denzel Washington – Fences

=== Best Actor ===
Casey Affleck – Manchester by the Sea as Lee Chandler

- Joel Edgerton – Loving as Richard Loving
- Andrew Garfield – Hacksaw Ridge as Desmond T. Doss
- Ryan Gosling – La La Land as Sebastian Wilder
- Denzel Washington – Fences as Troy Maxson

=== Best Actress ===
Emma Stone – La La Land as Mia Dolan

- Amy Adams – Arrival as Dr. Louise Banks
- Annette Bening – 20th Century Women as Dorothea Fields
- Rebecca Hall – Christine as Christine Chubbuck
- Ruth Negga – Loving as Mildred Loving
- Natalie Portman – Jackie as Jacqueline Kennedy

=== Best Supporting Actor ===
Jeff Bridges – Hell or High Water as Marcus Hamilton

- Mahershala Ali – Moonlight as Juan
- Alden Ehrenreich – Hail, Caesar! as Hobie Doyle
- Ralph Fiennes – A Bigger Splash as Harry Hawkes
- Lucas Hedges – Manchester by the Sea as Patrick Chandler

=== Best Supporting Actress ===
Viola Davis – Fences as Rose Maxson (TIE)
Greta Gerwig – 20th Century Women as Abbie (TIE)

- Elle Fanning – 20th Century Women as Julie
- Felicity Jones – A Monster Calls as Lizzie O'Malley
- Michelle Williams – Manchester by the Sea as Randi Chandler

=== Best Ensemble ===
20th Century Women

- Everybody Wants Some!!
- Hell or High Water
- Manchester by the Sea
- Moonlight

=== Breakthrough Performance ===
Kelly Fremon Craig – The Edge of Seventeen (director, screenplay)

- Mahershala Ali – Moonlight, Hidden Figures (actor)
- Lucas Hedges – Manchester by the Sea (actor)
- Barry Jenkins – Moonlight (director, screenplay)
- Trevante Rhodes – Moonlight (actor)
- Trey Edward Shults – Krisha (director, screenplay)

=== Best Screenplay ===
Damien Chazelle – La La Land

- Eric Heisserer – Arrival
- Barry Jenkins – Moonlight
- Kenneth Lonergan – Manchester by the Sea
- Taylor Sheridan – Hell or High Water

=== Best Documentary ===
O.J.: Made in America

- 13th
- Gleason
- Life, Animated
- Tickled
- Weiner

== 2017 ==
=== Best Film ===
The Florida Project

- The Disaster Artist
- Get Out
- The Shape of Water
- Three Billboards Outside Ebbing, Missouri

=== Best Director ===
Sean Baker – The Florida Project

- Paul Thomas Anderson – Phantom Thread
- Guillermo del Toro – The Shape of Water
- Greta Gerwig – Lady Bird
- Christopher Nolan – Dunkirk
- Jordan Peele – Get Out

=== Best Actor ===
James Franco – The Disaster Artist as Tommy Wiseau

- Timothée Chalamet – Call Me by Your Name as Elio Perlman
- Daniel Day-Lewis – Phantom Thread as Reynolds Woodcock
- Gary Oldman – Darkest Hour as Winston Churchill
- Robert Pattinson – Good Time as Constantine "Connie" Nikas

=== Best Actress ===
Frances McDormand – Three Billboards Outside Ebbing, Missouri as Mildred Hayes

- Jessica Chastain – Molly's Game as Molly Bloom
- Sally Hawkins – The Shape of Water as Elisa Esposito
- Margot Robbie – I, Tonya as Tonya Harding
- Saoirse Ronan – Lady Bird as Christine "Lady Bird" McPherson

=== Best Supporting Actor ===
Willem Dafoe – The Florida Project as Bobby Hicks

- Richard Jenkins – The Shape of Water as Giles
- Sam Rockwell – Three Billboards Outside Ebbing, Missouri as Jason Dixon
- Patrick Stewart – Logan as Charles Xavier
- Michael Stuhlbarg – Call Me by Your Name as Mr. Perlman

=== Best Supporting Actress ===
Allison Janney – I, Tonya as LaVona Golden

- Tiffany Haddish – Girls Trip as Dina
- Holly Hunter – The Big Sick as Beth Gardner
- Melissa Leo – Novitiate as Rev. Mother Marie St. Clair
- Laurie Metcalf – Lady Bird as Marion McPherson

=== Best Ensemble ===
The Post

- The Big Sick
- Lady Bird
- Mudbound
- Three Billboards Outside Ebbing, Missouri

=== Breakthrough Performance ===
Jordan Peele – Get Out (writer, director)

- Timothée Chalamet – Call Me by Your Name (actor)
- Gal Gadot – Wonder Woman (actress)
- Tiffany Haddish – Girls Trip (actress)
- Caleb Landry Jones – American Made, The Florida Project, Get Out, Three Billboards Outside Ebbing, Missouri (actor)

=== Best Screenplay ===
Martin McDonagh – Three Billboards Outside Ebbing, Missouri

- Guillermo del Toro and Vanessa Taylor – The Shape of Water
- Greta Gerwig – Lady Bird
- Emily V. Gordon and Kumail Nanjiani – The Big Sick
- Liz Hannah and Josh Singer – The Post
- Jordan Peele – Get Out
- Taylor Sheridan – Wind River

=== Best Documentary ===
Jim & Andy: The Great Beyond

- The Defiant Ones
- Human Flow
- Kedi
- Step
- Strong Island
- Whose Streets?

=== Best Animated Film ===
The Lego Batman Movie

- Captain Underpants: The First Epic Movie
- Cars 3
- Coco
- Loving Vincent

=== Best Use of Music ===
Baby Driver

- Blade Runner 2049
- Good Time
- Phantom Thread
- The Shape of Water

== 2018 ==
=== Best Film ===
Eighth Grade

- First Reformed
- Green Book
- A Quiet Place
- Roma

=== Best Director ===
Adam McKay – Vice

- Bo Burnham – Eighth Grade
- Bradley Cooper – A Star Is Born
- Alfonso Cuarón – Roma
- Paul Schrader – First Reformed

=== Best Actor ===
Ethan Hawke – First Reformed as Reverend Ernst Toller

- Christian Bale – Vice as Dick Cheney
- Bradley Cooper – A Star Is Born as Jackson Maine
- Rami Malek – Bohemian Rhapsody as Freddie Mercury
- John David Washington – BlacKkKlansman as Detective Ron Stallworth

=== Best Actress ===
Toni Collette – Hereditary as Annie Graham

- Olivia Colman – The Favourite as Queen Anne
- Elsie Fisher – Eighth Grade as Kayla Day
- Lady Gaga – A Star Is Born as Ally Maine
- Melissa McCarthy – Can You Ever Forgive Me? as Lee Israel

=== Best Supporting Actor ===
Josh Hamilton – Eighth Grade as Mark Day

- Mahershala Ali – Green Book as Don Shirley
- Sam Elliott – A Star Is Born as Bobby Maine
- Richard E. Grant – Can You Ever Forgive Me? as Jack Hock
- Jesse Plemons – Game Night as Gary Kingsbury

=== Best Supporting Actress ===
Regina King – If Beale Street Could Talk as Sharon Rivers

- Amy Adams – Vice as Lynne Cheney
- Thomasin McKenzie – Leave No Trace as Tom
- Emma Stone — The Favourite as Abigail Hill
- Rachel Weisz – The Favourite as Sarah Churchill

=== Best Ensemble ===
Vice

- Crazy Rich Asians
- Eighth Grade
- The Favourite
- Roma

=== Breakthrough Performance ===
Bo Burnham – Eighth Grade (writer/director)

- Rafael Casal and Daveed Diggs – Blindspotting (writers/actors)
- Elsie Fisher – Eighth Grade (actress)
- Lady Gaga – A Star Is Born (actress)
- Boots Riley – Sorry to Bother You (writer/director)

=== Best Screenplay ===
Brian Hayes Currie, Peter Farrelly, and Nick Vallelonga – Green Book (TIE)
Adam McKay – Vice (TIE)

- Bo Burnham – Eighth Grade
- Deborah Davis and Tony McNamara – The Favourite
- Paul Schrader – First Reformed

=== Best Documentary ===
Three Identical Strangers

- Free Solo
- RBG
- Whitney
- Won't You Be My Neighbor?

=== Best Animated Film ===
Spider-Man: Into the Spider-Verse

- Incredibles 2
- Isle of Dogs
- Ralph Breaks the Internet
- Smallfoot

=== Best Use of Music ===
A Star Is Born

- Bohemian Rhapsody
- Green Book
- Mandy
- Mary Poppins Returns

== 2019 ==
=== Best Film ===
Parasite

- The Irishman
- Jojo Rabbit
- Marriage Story
- Once Upon a Time in Hollywood

=== Best Director ===
Martin Scorsese – The Irishman

- Noah Baumbach – Marriage Story
- Bong Joon-ho – Parasite
- Quentin Tarantino – Once Upon a Time in Hollywood
- Taika Waititi – Jojo Rabbit

=== Best Actor ===
Adam Driver – Marriage Story as Charlie Barber

- Robert De Niro – The Irishman as Frank "The Irishman" Sheeran
- Robert Pattinson – The Lighthouse as Ephraim Winslow
- Joaquin Phoenix – Joker as Arthur Fleck / Joker
- Adam Sandler – Uncut Gems as Howard Ratner

=== Best Actress ===
Scarlett Johansson – Marriage Story as Nicole Barber

- Julianne Moore – Gloria Bell as Gloria Bell
- Lupita Nyong'o – Us as Adelaide Wilson / Red
- Charlize Theron – Bombshell as Megyn Kelly
- Renée Zellweger – Judy as Judy Garland

=== Best Supporting Actor ===
Joe Pesci – The Irishman as Russell Bufalino

- Willem Dafoe – The Lighthouse as Thomas Wake
- Tom Hanks – A Beautiful Day in the Neighborhood as Fred Rogers
- Brad Pitt – Once Upon a Time in Hollywood as Cliff Booth
- Sam Rockwell – Richard Jewell as Watson Bryant
- Wesley Snipes – Dolemite Is My Name as D'Urville Martin

=== Best Supporting Actress ===
Laura Dern – Marriage Story as Nora Fanshaw

- Kathy Bates – Richard Jewell as Barbara "Bobi" Jewell
- Scarlett Johansson – Jojo Rabbit as Rosie Betzler
- Anna Paquin – The Irishman as Peggy Sheeran
- Florence Pugh – Little Women as Amy March

=== Best Ensemble ===
Once Upon a Time in Hollywood

- Dolemite Is My Name
- The Farewell
- The Irishman
- Parasite

=== Breakthrough Performance ===
Florence Pugh – Fighting with My Family, Midsommar, Little Women (actress)

- Ana de Armas – Knives Out, The Informer, Yesterday (actress)
- Jessie Buckley – Wild Rose, Judy (actress)
- Kaitlyn Dever – Booksmart, Them That Follow (actress)
- Aisling Franciosi – The Nightingale (actress)
- Paul Walter Hauser – Richard Jewell, Late Night, Beats (actor)
- Lulu Wang – The Farewell (writer/director/producer)
- Olivia Wilde – Booksmart (director)

=== Best Screenplay ===
Noah Baumbach – Marriage Story

- Bong Joon-ho and Han Jin-won – Parasite
- Robert Eggers and Max Eggers – The Lighthouse
- Quentin Tarantino – Once Upon a Time in Hollywood
- Steven Zaillian – The Irishman

=== Best Documentary ===
Apollo 11

- Amazing Grace
- Horror Noire: A History of Black Horror
- Knock Down the House
- Rolling Thunder Revue: A Bob Dylan Story by Martin Scorsese

=== Best Animated Film ===
Toy Story 4

- Frozen II
- How to Train Your Dragon: The Hidden World
- I Lost My Body
- Klaus

=== Best Use of Music ===
Once Upon a Time in Hollywood

- 1917
- Rocketman
- Uncut Gems
- Wild Rose

== 2020 ==
=== Best Film ===
Nomadland

- First Cow
- Minari
- Sound of Metal
- The Trial of the Chicago 7

=== Best Director ===
Chloé Zhao – Nomadland

- Lee Isaac Chung – Minari
- Regina King – One Night in Miami...
- Spike Lee – Da 5 Bloods
- Aaron Sorkin – The Trial of the Chicago 7

=== Best Actor ===
Delroy Lindo – Da 5 Bloods as Paul

- Riz Ahmed – Sound of Metal as Ruben Stone
- Chadwick Boseman – Ma Rainey's Black Bottom as Levee Green
- Anthony Hopkins – The Father as Anthony
- Steven Yeun – Minari as Jacob Yi

=== Best Actress ===
Frances McDormand – Nomadland as Fern

- Jessie Buckley – I'm Thinking of Ending Things as Young Woman
- Viola Davis – Ma Rainey's Black Bottom as Ma Rainey
- Vanessa Kirby – Pieces of a Woman as Martha Weiss
- Carey Mulligan – Promising Young Woman as Cassandra "Cassie" Thomas

=== Best Supporting Actor ===
Daniel Kaluuya – Judas and the Black Messiah as Fred Hampton

- Christopher Abbott – Possessor as Colin Tate
- Sacha Baron Cohen – The Trial of the Chicago 7 as Abbie Hoffman
- Leslie Odom Jr. – One Night in Miami... as Sam Cooke
- Paul Raci – Sound of Metal as Joe

=== Best Supporting Actress ===
Yuh-Jung Youn – Minari as Soon-ja

- Maria Bakalova – Borat Subsequent Moviefilm as Tutar Sagdiyev
- Ellen Burstyn – Pieces of a Woman as Elizabeth Weiss
- Glenn Close – Hillbilly Elegy as Bonnie "Mamaw" Vance
- Olivia Colman – The Father as Anne

=== Best Ensemble ===
Minari

- Da 5 Bloods
- Ma Rainey's Black Bottom
- One Night in Miami...
- The Trial of the Chicago 7

=== Breakthrough Performance ===
Maria Bakalova – Borat Subsequent Moviefilm (actress)

- Jasmine Batchelor – The Surrogate (actress)
- Radha Blank – The 40-Year-Old Version (actress/writer/director/producer)
- Orion Lee – First Cow (actor)
- Wunmi Mosaku – His House (actress)

=== Best Adapted Screenplay ===
Chloé Zhao – Nomadland

- Charlie Kaufman – I’m Thinking of Ending Things
- Kemp Powers – One Night in Miami...
- Kelly Reichardt and Jonathan Raymond – First Cow
- Ruben Santiago-Hudson – Ma Rainey's Black Bottom

=== Best Original Screenplay ===
Lee Isaac Chung – Minari

- Emerald Fennell – Promising Young Woman
- Shaka King and Will Berson – Judas and the Black Messiah
- Darius Marder and Abraham Marder – Sound of Metal
- Aaron Sorkin – The Trial of the Chicago 7

=== Best Documentary ===
Dick Johnson Is Dead

- All In: The Fight for Democracy
- Boys State
- The Dissident
- Time

=== Best Animated Film ===
Soul

- The Croods: A New Age
- Onward
- Over the Moon
- Wolfwalkers

=== Best Use of Music ===
Sound of Metal

- News of the World
- Possessor
- Soul
- Tenet

== 2021 ==
=== Best Film ===
Cyrano

- Belfast
- CODA
- Don't Look Up
- King Richard

=== Best Director ===
Lin-Manuel Miranda – tick, tick... BOOM!

- Sean Baker – Red Rocket
- Kenneth Branagh – Belfast
- David Lowery – The Green Knight
- Adam McKay – Don't Look Up

=== Best Actor ===
Peter Dinklage – Cyrano as Cyrano de Bergerac

- Nicolas Cage – Pig as Robin "Rob" Feld
- Andrew Garfield – tick, tick... BOOM! as Jonathan Larson
- Oscar Isaac – The Card Counter as William Tell
- Will Smith – King Richard as Richard Williams

=== Best Actress ===
Jessica Chastain – The Eyes of Tammy Faye as Tammy Faye Bakker

- Alana Haim – Licorice Pizza as Alana Kane
- Jennifer Hudson – Respect as Aretha Franklin
- Nicole Kidman – Being the Ricardos as Lucille Ball
- Kristen Stewart – Spencer as Princess Diana

=== Best Supporting Actor ===
Jon Bernthal – King Richard as Rick Macci

- Troy Kotsur – CODA as Frank Rossi
- Jared Leto – House of Gucci as Paolo Gucci
- Ray Liotta – The Many Saints of Newark as Aldo "Hollywood Dick" Moltisanti / Salvatore "Sally" Moltisanti
- Kodi Smit-McPhee – The Power of the Dog as Peter Gordon

=== Best Supporting Actress ===
Ariana DeBose – West Side Story as Anita

- Kirsten Dunst – The Power of the Dog as Rose Gordon
- Aunjanue Ellis – King Richard as Oracene "Brandy" Price
- Rita Moreno – West Side Story as Valentina
- Diana Rigg – Last Night in Soho as Ms. Collins

=== Best Ensemble ===
The French Dispatch

- CODA
- Don't Look Up
- The Harder They Fall
- House of Gucci

=== Breakthrough Performance ===
Woody Norman – C'mon C'mon (actor) (TIE)
Emma Seligman – Shiva Baby (writer/director) (TIE)

- Alana Haim – Licorice Pizza (actress)
- Emilia Jones – CODA (actress)
- Agathe Rousselle – Titane (actress)

=== Best Adapted Screenplay ===
Jane Campion – The Power of the Dog

- Sian Heder – CODA
- Quiara Alegría Hudes – In the Heights
- Steven Levenson – tick, tick... BOOM!
- David Lowery – The Green Knight

=== Best Original Screenplay ===
Adam McKay – Don't Look Up

- Pedro Almodóvar – Parallel Mothers
- Paul Thomas Anderson – Licorice Pizza
- Wes Anderson – The French Dispatch
- Jeymes Samuel and Boaz Yakin – The Harder They Fall

=== Best Documentary ===
Flee (TIE)
Summer of Soul (...Or, When the Revolution Could Not Be Televised) (TIE)

- Roadrunner: A Film About Anthony Bourdain
- The Sparks Brothers
- Street Gang: How We Got to Sesame Street

=== Best Animated Film ===
The Mitchells vs. the Machines

- Belle
- Cryptozoo
- Encanto
- Flee
- Luca

=== Best Use of Music ===
Last Night in Soho

- Cyrano
- In the Heights
- tick, tick... BOOM!
- West Side Story
