= Demi Singleton =

American actress, singer, and dancer

- Born: Demi Patricia Singleton; February 27, 2007 (age 19); Baton Rouge, Louisiana, U.S.
- Education: Marlborough School
- Occupations: Actress; Singer; Dancer; Musician
- Years active: 2017–present
- Known for: King Richard; Godfather of Harlem
- Musical career
- Genres: R&B, Pop, Musical Theatre, Hip Hop
- Instrument: Vocals

Demi Patricia Singleton (born 27 February 2007) is an American actress, singer, and dancer. She is best known for her roles in the MGM+ crime TV series Godfather of Harlem, as the young Serena Williams in the biographical film King Richard, and as Sally Reeves in the Paramount+ western series Lawmen: Bass Reeves.

== Early life ==
Born in Baton Rouge, Singleton's family is from the Central American country of Honduras and the Caribbean island of Dominica. She initially lived in New Orleans, and moved to New York City at the age of three. She began training in the arts with New York's finest teachers in music, dance and acting. She has studied classical ballet since the age of three and began playing the cello when she was four. She studied at a rigorous music conservatory for children in Brooklyn for 6 years where she learned to play instruments by ear through the Suzuki method. At nine, she attended a Broadway musical featuring child performers and decided that she also wanted to pursue a career as a stage performer.

In May 2025, Singleton graduated from Marlborough School (Los Angeles), an independent girls’ school. That fall, she enrolled at Yale University, where she began her undergraduate studies.

== Career ==
Singleton began acting in 2017, and made her Broadway debut in Andrew Lloyd Webber's School of Rock at ten years old, performing for nearly a year before joining Disney's The Lion King on Broadway as young Nala.

In September 2018, Singleton was cast in the Epix crime drama, Godfather of Harlem, led by Academy Award winner Forest Whitaker, as his character's granddaughter Margaret Johnson.

In 2020, Singleton was cast to star as Serena Williams in the Will Smith-led Warner Bros. sports drama King Richard, which tells the story of how Serena and Venus Williams rose to success from the planning and coaching of their father, Richard Williams. The film was finally released in November 2021. She also portrayed young Serena Williams in the 2019 Bumble Super Bowl commercial.

== Filmography ==
=== Film ===
Year	Title	Role	Notes
2017	Goldie	Demi (Janet's daughter)	
2021	King Richard	Serena Williams	
2024	The Deliverance	Shante Jackson	

=== Television ===
Year	Title	Role	Notes
2019	Godfather of Harlem	Margaret Johnson	Main role, 20 episodes
2023	Lawmen: Bass Reeves	Sally Reeves	Main role

=== Theater ===
Year(s)	Production	Role	Location	Category
2017–2018	School of Rock	Sophie	Winter Garden Theatre	Broadway
2018	The Lion King	young Nala	Minskoff Theatre	Broadway

== Awards and nominations ==
Solo Awards for Demi Singleton
Year	Award	Category	Work	Result	Ref
2022	Black Reel Awards	Breakthrough Performance – Female	King Richard	Nominated	
2022	San Diego Film Critics Society	Best Youth Performance	King Richard	Nominated	

Ensemble Awards for Demi Singleton
Year	Award	Category	Work	Result	Ref
2022	Black Reel Awards	Outstanding Ensemble	King Richard	Nominated	
2022	NAACP Image Awards	Outstanding Ensemble Cast in a Motion Picture	King Richard	Nominated	
2022	Screen Actors Guild Awards	Outstanding Performance by a Cast in a Motion Picture	King Richard	Nominated	
