= Stuart McClave =

American director (born 1987)

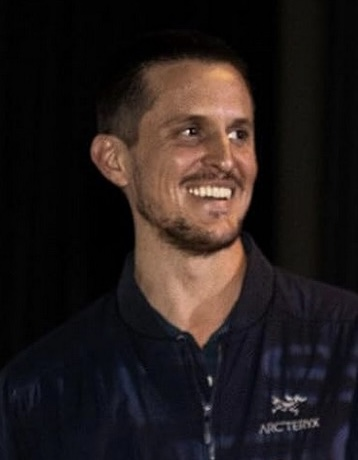
- McClave in 2023
- Born: Stuart Zebrowski McClave; August 29, 1987 (age 39); Washington, D.C., U.S.
- Education: University of Southern California (BA)
- Occupations: Producer; director; writer
- Years active: 2011–present
- Partner: Cooper Koch (2024–present)

Stuart Zebrowski McClave (born August 29, 1987) is an American filmmaker. He is known for directing, writing, and producing the documentary film On the Line: The Richard Williams Story (2022), which centers on tennis patriarch and coach Richard Williams.

== Early life and education ==
McClave was born on August 29, 1987, in Washington, D.C., but relocated to Southern California at an early age. He comes from a biracial family; he has an adoptive sister, who is African American. McClave developed an interest in tennis at the age of six or seven, when his father began bringing him to courts, and became a fan of Venus and Serena Williams. At 13 years old, he began competing in matches across Southern California.

McClave attended Loyola High School in Los Angeles before pursuing higher education at the University of Southern California, where he earned dual degrees from the USC School of Cinematic Arts and the USC Annenberg School for Communication and Journalism in 2010. During his senior year at USC, McClave gained attention for publishing an op-ed piece in the Los Angeles Times. Titled "Holding On In Compton," the piece explored the changing demographics in the city of Compton, California, highlighting the racial disparity between the city's politicians and its residents.

== Career ==
After graduating from USC, McClave served as a producer and development executive for NBCUniversal, Discovery Channel, and the feature film producer Mark Ciardi.

In 2022, he made his directorial debut with the documentary On the Line: The Richard Williams Story. The film had its world premiere at the Tribeca Film Festival and its international premiere at the 2023 Sheffield DocFest. Centered on Richard Williams, father and coach to tennis stars Venus Williams and Serena Williams, Williams delves into his battle against racism, suppression, and violence. The film has garnered praise as an emotional reckoning on race in America, family, courage, and determination.

Phil Harrison from The Guardian praised the film for being much more than just a story about "two gifted tennis players and their ambitious father," but rather a "fascinating" retelling of the "history of American racism." Critics from Variety and the Golden Globes also gave the film a positive review, with the latter commending it for "bringing a fresh perspective and breathing life into its subject in a way that not even King Richard was able to accomplish."

In May 2023, it was announced that Fremantle had acquired the global distribution rights to the film, which was released on various platforms including Sky UK, Network 10, M-Net, and Canal +.

== Personal life ==
McClave shared that he is passionate about "social justice, politics, sports, LGBTQIA+ issues, and shedding light on underrepresented voices and communities". Since 2024, he has been in a relationship with actor Cooper Koch.

== Filmography ==
Year	Title	Role	Notes
2022	On the Line: The Richard Williams Story	Director, producer, writer	Feature film

== Music videos ==
Year	Song	Artist	Role	Ref.
2022	"Oceans"	Young Jesus	Director	
