= Akiko Stehrenberger =

American designer (born 1978)

Akiko Stehrenberger (born 1978) is an American designer who specializes in movie posters, working in a mix of digital and traditional paint. Dubbed the "Poster Girl", she has received 34 Clio Awards for her work.

== Biography ==
Shehrenberger's poster of On the Line: The Richard Williams Story (2022) was ranked among "movie posters of the year 2022" by Creative Review.

Akiko Stehrenberger was born in South Lake Tahoe, California, in 1978 to a Swiss German father and a Taiwanese mother. She attended the ArtCenter College of Design in Pasadena, graduating with a Bachelor's Degree of Fine Art. Stehrenberger began her career creating editorial illustrations for entertainment magazines in New York City, such as Spin and the New York Press. Moving back to California, Stehrenberger began working as a junior designer at an ad agency in Los Angeles, saying that she "sort of fell into" the movie poster business. As a designer, she created the poster of Funny Games (2007), which was named the best film poster of the decade by Mubi. Her 2020 book, Akikomatic: The Work of Akiko Stehrenberger, presents several of her posters throughout her career of more than 15 years.

== Style ==
Stehrenberger listed the following artists as her influences in 2006: Gustav Klimt, Egon Schiele, Amedeo Modigliani, Anita Kunz, Mark Ryden, Philip Burke, Sebastian Krüger. Her painting materials of choice were initially described as ballpoint pens, Gesso, and Liquitex acrylics, but she later moved on to use a mix of traditional and digital paint in her art. Stehrenberger said she used to consider herself "anti-digital", but turned around to the format to meet work deadlines.

== Reception ==
As the winner of 34 Clio Awards, Stehrenberger's oeuvre has been very well received. Design critics from Print, Creative Review, Hyperallergic, and Creative Bloq have praised her film posters. Interview magazine dubbed her "Poster Girl." Adrian Shaughnessy of Print said that her "emphatic illustrations [...] offer an echo of the great film posters of the past."

== Selected work ==
The following is a list of media for which posters designed by Stehrenberger have received praise by critics:

- Funny Games (2007)
- Kiss of the Damned (2012)
- Honey Boy (2019)
- Portrait of a Lady on Fire (2019)
- The Last Black Man in San Francisco (2019)
- On the Line: The Richard Williams Story (2022)
