= Murder of Yetunde Price =

American murder case

Yetunde Price
- Born: Yetunde Hawanya Tara Rasheed; August 9, 1972; Saginaw, Michigan, U.S.
- Died: September 14, 2003 (aged 31); Long Beach, California, U.S.
- Cause of death: Murder (gunshot wound – sustained in Compton, California, U.S.)
- Resting place: Forest Lawn Memorial Park (Hollywood Hills)
- Other name: Tunde Price
- Spouse: Byron Bobbitt (m. 1996; div. 2000)
- Partners: Jeffrey Johnson Sr. (c. 1991–1992); Rolland Wormley (2003–her death; engaged)
- Children: 3
- Mother: Oracene Price
- Relatives: Richard Williams (stepfather); Venus Williams (half-sister); Serena Williams (half-sister)

Yetunde Hawanya Tara Price (née Rasheed; August 9, 1972 – September 14, 2003) was the eldest maternal half-sister of and personal assistant to tennis players Venus and Serena Williams. On September 14, 2003, she was murdered in a drive-by shooting in Compton, California, by Robert E. Maxfield.

== Background ==
Yetunde was the oldest of Oracene Price's five daughters. She was one of Venus and Serena Williams' three maternal half-sisters, a sibling from a previous marriage between their mother and tennis coach, Oracene Price, and Yusuf Rasheed (born Joseph Bowman; died 2001).

For a time, Price worked as a personal assistant to her tennis-playing sisters and as a nurse. At the time of her death, she also owned a hair salon. According to media reports, Price, despite "accepting some financial assistance" from her sisters, continued to live with her children in their house in a "run-down" district and continued to work as a nurse, also engaging in her personal-assistant responsibilities which saw her appear at Wimbledon in the year of her death. According to the reports, Price was "determined to pay her own way in the world." Price was the mother of three children.

== Murder ==
On the night of September 14, 2003, Price was chatting with her fiancé in her SUV, parked outside what subsequently was revealed to be a crack house in suburban Compton, Los Angeles County. According to the prosecution at the subsequent trial, two members of the South Side Compton Crips street gang who were guarding the house, opened fire on the SUV in the belief that they were "defending [the] crack house from gangland rivals", presumably the Lime Hood Piru. Price's boyfriend, who later stated he did not realize that Price had been shot, drove her to a relative's home, where he called emergency services. Price was pronounced dead shortly after arriving at the hospital, from a bullet wound to the head.

Both the prosecutor and the defense at the murder trial agreed that Price was an innocent victim passing through the area.

== Trial ==
Southside Compton Crips street gang member Robert Edward Maxfield, 25 years old at the time of his conviction, pleaded no contest to voluntary manslaughter on March 22, 2006, the day before his third trial for Yetunde Price's killing was scheduled to start. The first two trials had ended in mistrials after jurors were unable to reach a verdict. The first trial ended in November 2004 with six jurors voting for acquittal, five for guilt, and one undecided. A second mistrial was declared April 29, 2005, when jurors deadlocked at 11–1 in favor of conviction.

A murder charge against a second defendant, who was accused of firing a handgun during the incident, was dismissed after the first trial, when authorities stated he did not cause the fatal wound.

On April 6, 2006, Judge Steven Suzukawa sentenced Maxfield to 15 years in prison with the possibility of parole. He was released in 2018, but was subsequently re-arrested after violating his parole.

== Aftermath ==
Compton rapper the Game dedicated his 2005 song "Dreams" to honor Yetunde Price's memory.

In 2016, the Williams sisters opened a community center in Compton for "victims of violence and their families", called the Yetunde Price Resource Center. Its tagline reads: "Committed to helping others heal".

On March 8, 2018, Maxfield, was released on parole from the Deuel Vocational Institution in Tracy, California, having served approximately 12 years of a 15 year sentence in prison. He was re-arrested later that year for violating parole.

In an interview with TIME, Serena Williams said she learned of his release on July 31, through Instagram, ten minutes before her match against Johanna Konta at the 2018 Silicon Valley Classic, a match she went on to lose 6–1, 6–0 to Konta in 52 minutes.

Price was portrayed by Mikayla LaShae Bartholomew (as "Tunde" Price) in the 2021 biographical film King Richard.
