= Funny Games (2007 film) =

2007 film by Michael Haneke

- Theatrical release poster by Akiko Stehrenberger
- Directed by: Michael Haneke
- Screenplay by: Michael Haneke
- Based on: Funny Games by Michael Haneke
- Produced by: Hamish McAlpine; Christian Baute; Chris Coen; Andro Steinborn; Naomi Watts
- Starring: Naomi Watts; Tim Roth; Michael Pitt; Brady Corbet; Devon Gearhart
- Cinematography: Darius Khondji
- Edited by: Monika Willi
- Production companies: Celluloid Dreams; Tartan Films; Film4 Productions; Halcyon Pictures
- Distributed by: Warner Independent Pictures (United States); Les Films du Losange (France); Tartan Films (United Kingdom); X Verleih AG (Germany); Lucky Red (Italy)
- Release dates: 20 October 2007 (London Film Festival); 14 March 2008 (United States); 4 April 2008 (United Kingdom); 23 April 2008 (France); 29 May 2008 (Germany)
- Running time: 111 minutes
- Countries: United States; Austria; France; United Kingdom; Germany; Italy
- Language: English
- Budget: $15 million
- Box office: $8.2 million

Funny Games (alternatively titled Funny Games U.S.) is a 2007 satirical psychological thriller film written and directed by Michael Haneke. The film is a shot-for-shot remake of his own 1997 film of the same title, albeit in English and set in the United States with different actors; Naomi Watts, Tim Roth, Michael Pitt, and Brady Corbet star in the main roles. Like the original, the film follows an affluent family as they are captured and tortured by two young criminals on their vacation.

Despite the film title labeled as "U.S.", Funny Games is an international co-production between the United States, United Kingdom, Austria, France, Germany, and Italy. It is the only Haneke film to not premiere at the Cannes Film Festival, instead premiering at several film festivals outside of Cannes including London and Sundance.

Unlike the original, the film received mixed reviews and was a commercial failure. Haneke has stated that the film is a reflection and criticism of violence used in media.

== Plot ==
George and Ann Farber, their son Georgie, and their dog Lucky arrive at their lake house. Their next door neighbor Fred comes over with two young men, Paul and Peter, to help put the boat into the lake, though Fred is behaving strangely.

While Ann is cooking, Peter visits and asks to borrow some eggs. She gives him the eggs, he leaves, and once out of sight drops the eggs, then returning to apologize for his clumsiness and ask for more. She gives him four more eggs and he leaves, but Lucky jumps on him, breaking the eggs. To Ann's frustration, Paul implores her to test one of his golf clubs outside, and Peter requests more eggs. George arrives and tries to oust them, ultimately slapping Paul. In retaliation, Peter breaks George's leg with the golf club. The two men then take the family hostage.

Paul guides Ann on a game of "Hot and Cold" to find Lucky, whom he had killed with the golf club. When their neighbors, the Thompsons, visit, Ann claims Paul and Peter are simply friends of theirs. After returning home, the Farbers are forced to participate in a number of sadistic games in order to stay alive, during which they put Georgie's head in a pillowcase and ask Ann to strip naked. Georgie is hurt by Paul until she complies. When released from the pillowcase, Georgie escapes and goes to Fred's house, where he discovers bloody corpses.

Meanwhile, Paul ties Ann up before going out to search for Georgie, leaving Peter to watch over the Farbers. Ann asks why they do not directly kill them, and Peter answers that they should not forget the fun of the games. When Peter goes to the kitchen to get eggs, Ann jumps to George but George fails to free her before Peter comes back, and Peter beats her and breaks the eggs again. Ann begs Peter to let them go, but he refuses. Georgie finds a shotgun in Fred's house and Paul tells him to go ahead and shoot him with it, but the gun fails to go off, revealing the gun to be empty. Paul returns him to the living room, and gives the shotgun to Peter, and reveals the two missing shotgun shells.

The men play a new game, saying whoever gets counted out will be shot. While Paul is in the kitchen getting something to eat, Georgie panics and runs, which results in Peter shooting and killing him. Paul berates Peter for being trigger-happy, and the two men decide to briefly leave. George and Ann are grief-stricken over their loss, but they eventually resolve to survive. Ann is able to free herself and flee the house while George desperately tries to make a 911 call on the malfunctioning phone. Ann fails to find help, only to be re-captured by Peter and Paul, who bring her back to the house.

The next level of games begin with Peter stabbing George. They tell Ann to say a prayer before making a choice for her husband; a painful and prolonged death with the "little" knife, or a quick and brutal death with the "big" shotgun. While Paul is talking, Ann seizes the shotgun on the table in front of her and kills Peter. An enraged Paul grabs the shotgun and starts looking for the television remote. Upon finding it, he rewinds the last occurrences back to a moment before Ann grabs the shotgun, breaking the fourth wall. On the "do over", Paul snatches the shotgun away before she can grab it and admonishes her, saying she is not allowed to break the rules.

Peter and Paul kill George and take Ann, bound and gagged, out onto the family's boat. Ann tries to free herself but is caught by Paul and Peter. Paul nonchalantly pushes her into the water to drown. They knock on the door of the Thompsons' house and request some eggs. Paul glances at the camera with a smirk, suggesting their intentions to restart the cycle of violence.

== Cast ==
- Naomi Watts as Ann Farber
- Tim Roth as George Farber, Ann's husband
- Devon Gearhart as George "Georgie" Farber Jr., Ann and George's son
- Michael Pitt as Paul
- Brady Corbet as Peter
- Boyd Gaines as Fred, the Farbers' neighbor
- Siobhan Fallon Hogan as Betsy Thompson
- Robert LuPone as Robert Thompson
- Susanne Haneke as Betsy's sister-in-law
- Linda Moran as Eve

For 2007's American remake, the character of Gerda was renamed "Betsy", the second family to fall victim to Paul and Peter were given the surname "Farber" and the third family were given the surname "Thompson".

== Development ==
Michael Haneke wanted to make a film set in the United States, but for practical reasons he had to set the original 1997 film in Austria.

After the 2007 film used the same house including props and tones, Robert Koehler of Cineaste wrote that this "proves for certain that—whether he uses the great cinematographer Jürgen Jürges (for the 1997 version) or the great Darius Khondji (for the new film)—Haneke is fundamentally his own cinematographer exercising considerable control over the entire look of his films."

Exterior scenes were filmed on Long Island.

== Release ==
The film made its British premiere at the London Film Festival on 20 October 2007. Its United States premiere was at the 2008 Sundance Film Festival on 19 January 2008. It began a limited release in the United States and Canada on 14 March 2008, distributed by Warner Independent. A wider release to more theaters came on 8 April 2008. The film was shown at the Istanbul Film Festival in April 2008. It did not receive a wide theatrical release in the United States before coming out on DVD. Funny Games was a box office failure, grossing a little more than half of its $15 million budget. Guardian writer Geoffrey Macnab included Funny Games's lack of success among the reasons for the closure of Tartan Films, which co-produced the film and released it in the United Kingdom. In Germany, the film was released under the title "Funny Games U.S.".

The film's poster, done by Akiko Stehrenberger, is considered by professional poster designer Adrian Curry to be his favorite film poster of the 2000s.

=== Home media ===
The DVD was released on 10 June 2008, in the US. The DVD does not contain any extra material but instead it includes both widescreen and full screen editions on one disc. In the UK, the DVD and Blu-ray were released on 28 July with the extra material being the original theatrical trailer, Q&A with producers Hamish McAlpine and Chris Coen, interviews with the cast, viral video clips and film notes. On October 6 2025 Curzon included the film in their Haneke collection box-set.

Haneke states that the entire film was not intended to be a horror film. He says he wanted to make a message about violence in the media by making an incredibly violent, but otherwise pointless movie. He had written a short essay revealing how he felt on the issue, called "Violence + Media." The essay is included as a chapter in the book A Companion to Michael Haneke.

== Reception ==
The film received mixed reviews from critics. The review aggregator Rotten Tomatoes reported that 53% of critics gave the film positive reviews, based on 146 reviews, with an average rating of 5.8/10. The website's critical consensus reads, "Though made with great skill, Funny Games is nevertheless a sadistic exercise in chastising the audience." Metacritic reported the film had an average score of 44 out of 100, based on 33 reviews, indicating "mixed or average" reviews.

Todd Gilchrist from IGN called the film "Unrelenting and brilliant, Funny Games is a truly great film – an incisive, artistic triumph that doubles as a remarkably thrilling and unique cinematic experience." Conversely, Joshua Rothkopf from Time Out New York called the film "a sour project that defines anti-imaginative." A.O. Scott of The New York Times wrote: "At least with the remake Funny Games, Mr. Haneke shows a certain kinship with someone like Eli Roth, whose Hostel movies have brought nothing but scorn from responsible critics." The Chicago Sun-Times review of 13 March 2008 gave the film a mere half-star out of a possible four.

The Times of London ranked it #25 on its 100 Worst Films of 2008 list, calling it "art-house torture porn."

== Soundtrack ==
The music in the introduction and the closing credits is "Bonehead" by the band Naked City from the album Torture Garden.

== See also ==
- List of films featuring home invasions
