= Detroit Film Critics Society Award for Best Supporting Actress =

Annual US film award

The Detroit Film Critics Society Award for Best Supporting Actress is an annual award given by the Detroit Film Critics Society to honor the best supporting actor that year.

== Notes ==
- † indicates the winner of the Academy Award for Best Supporting Actress.

== Winners ==
indicates the winners.

=== 2000s ===
Year	Actor	Film
2007	Tilda Swinton †	Michael Clayton
2007	Cate Blanchett	I'm Not There
2007	Catherine Keener	Into the Wild
2007	Emily Mortimer	Lars and the Real Girl
2007	Amy Ryan	Gone Baby Gone
2008	Marisa Tomei	The Wrestler
2008	Amy Adams	Doubt
2008	Elizabeth Banks	W.
2008	Penélope Cruz †	Vicky Cristina Barcelona
2008	Rosemarie DeWitt	Rachel Getting Married
2009	Mo'Nique †	Precious
2009	Marion Cotillard	Nine
2009	Vera Farmiga	Up in the Air
2009	Anna Kendrick	Up in the Air
2009	Mélanie Laurent	Inglourious Basterds

=== 2010s ===
Year	Actor	Film
2010	Amy Adams	The Fighter
2010	Helena Bonham Carter	The King's Speech
2010	Greta Gerwig	Greenberg
2010	Melissa Leo †	The Fighter
2010	Jacki Weaver	Animal Kingdom
2011	Carey Mulligan	Shame
2011	Bérénice Bejo	The Artist
2011	Jessica Chastain	Take Shelter
2011	Vanessa Redgrave	Coriolanus
2011	Octavia Spencer †	The Help
2012	Anne Hathaway †	Les Misérables
2012	Amy Adams	The Master
2012	Ann Dowd	Compliance
2012	Sally Field	Lincoln
2012	Helen Hunt	The Sessions
2013	Scarlett Johansson	Her
2013	Jennifer Lawrence	American Hustle
2013	Julia Roberts	August: Osage County
2013	Lupita Nyong'o †	12 Years a Slave
2013	June Squibb	Nebraska
2014	Patricia Arquette †	Boyhood
2014	Laura Dern	Wild
2014	Rene Russo	Nightcrawler
2014	Emma Stone	Birdman
2014	Tilda Swinton	Snowpiercer
2015	Alicia Vikander †	The Danish Girl
2015	Jennifer Jason Leigh	The Hateful Eight
2015	Cynthia Nixon	James White
2015	Kristen Stewart	Clouds of Sils Maria
2015	Alicia Vikander	Ex Machina
2016	Viola Davis †	Fences (TIE)
2016	Greta Gerwig	20th Century Women (TIE)
2016	Elle Fanning	20th Century Women
2016	Felicity Jones	A Monster Calls
2016	Michelle Williams	Manchester by the Sea
2017	Allison Janney †	I, Tonya
2017	Tiffany Haddish	Girls Trip
2017	Holly Hunter	The Big Sick
2017	Melissa Leo	Novitiate
2017	Laurie Metcalf	Lady Bird
2018	Regina King †	If Beale Street Could Talk
2018	Amy Adams	Vice
2018	Thomasin McKenzie	Leave No Trace
2018	Emma Stone	The Favourite
2018	Rachel Weisz	The Favourite
2019	Laura Dern †	Marriage Story
2019	Kathy Bates	Richard Jewell
2019	Scarlett Johansson	Jojo Rabbit
2019	Anna Paquin	The Irishman
2019	Florence Pugh	Little Women

=== 2020s ===
Year	Actress	Film
2020	Youn Yuh-jung †	Minari
2020	Ellen Burstyn	Pieces of a Woman
2020	Glenn Close	Hillbilly Elegy
2020	Maria Bakalova	Borat Subsequent Moviefilm
2020	Olivia Colman	The Father
2021	Ariana DeBose †	West Side Story
2021	Kirsten Dunst	The Power of the Dog
2021	Aunjanue Ellis	King Richard
2021	Rita Moreno	West Side Story
2021	Diana Rigg	Last Night in Soho
