= Oracene Price =

American tennis coach (born 1952)

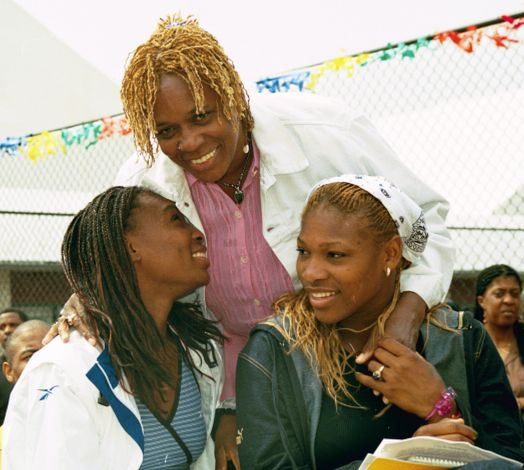
- Price with two of her daughters, 2001
- Born: April 3, 1952 (age 74) Saginaw, Michigan, U.S.

Coaching career (1994–2003)
- Venus Williams, Serena Williams (known as the "Williams sisters")

Coaching achievements
- Coachee singles titles total: 49 (V) – 72 (S) (121 titles)
- Coachee doubles titles total: 21 (S-V) – 2 (V) – 5 (S) (28 titles)
- List of notable tournaments (with champion): Career Golden Slam – Singles (Serena) 7x Australian Open (Serena) 3x French Open (Serena) 12x Wimbledon (Williams sisters) 8x US Open (Williams sisters) 2x Olympic gold medal (Williams sisters) 6x WTA Tour Championships (Williams sisters) 28x WTA Tier I/Premier Mandatory/Premier 5 (Williams sisters) Career Golden Slam – Doubles (Williams sisters) 4x Australian Open (Williams sisters) 2x French Open (Williams sisters) 6x Wimbledon (Williams sisters) 2x US Open (Williams sisters) 3x Olympic gold medal Fed Cup champions (Williams sisters) 2x Hopman Cup (Serena); List of titles

Coaching awards and records
- Records: Venus Williams § Records and achievements; Serena Williams § Other records and achievements

Oracene Price (born April 3, 1952), formerly known as Brandy Williams, is an American tennis coach. She is best known for being both the mother and coach of Venus and Serena Williams, both of whom are widely regarded as among the best female tennis players of all time. She is the former wife of Richard Williams, whom she divorced in 2002.

== Biography ==
Nicknamed "Brandy", Price was born in Saginaw, Michigan in 1952. Her father was an automotive worker from the Mississippi Delta. She graduated from Buena Vista High School in 1970 and from Western Michigan University. She has three daughters from a previous marriage to Yusuf Rasheed (born Joseph Bowman): Yetunde Price (1972–2003), who was a former beauty salon owner and registered nurse; Lyndrea Price, a Web designer; and Isha Price, a lawyer. After divorcing Rasheed, while working as a nurse, Oracene married Richard Williams and had two more daughters, Venus Williams and Serena Williams. Both Venus and Serena are professional tennis players who were previously ranked as the world No. 1 in women's singles by the Women's Tennis Association, and both have won numerous Grand Slam tournaments individually and as a doubles team. She helped her husband as he began coaching Venus and Serena in tennis. The Williams family moved to Florida on the offer of Rick Macci to coach their daughters for free.

By the end of 2000, Price was no longer living with her husband Richard Williams, and citing irreconcilable differences, they divorced in 2002. She reverted to her maiden name of Price.

During a semifinal match between Serena and Justine Henin at the 2003 French Open, Williams was booed by fans after a complaint about a line call. Price believes that the boos were motivated by race, saying, "We, as black people, live with this all the time. It's all about control." Tennis journalist and author L. Jon Wertheim has said of Price, "You have to respect anyone incapable of gloss or spin (i.e., unwilling to lie)."

Price describes herself as a deeply spiritual woman. Price also has described herself as being a "rampant feminist" when dealing with the overly sexualized images of women in the media.

She traveled to Kenya with her daughter Serena for charity work, as well as Senegal to aid in the construction of schools.

Price was portrayed by Aunjanue Ellis-Taylor in the 2021 biopic King Richard. Ellis-Taylor was nominated for the Academy Award for Best Supporting Actress for her performance while the film itself was nominated for the Academy Award for Best Picture.

== Coaching ==
Price's coaching has arguably been overshadowed by her role as mother, but as a coach she has been called underappreciated. Price is not a coach in a traditional sense (though she did learn tennis herself to help teach her daughters the technical aspects of the game) and is instead credited, along with Richard for helping to build a solid foundation of self-esteem and outside interests for her daughters.

Venus and Serena's "poise under pressure" is often credited to the self-belief instilled in them by their mother. "There's no such thing as pressure," says Price. "As black Americans, that's all we've ever had. It's life. So where's the pressure?" This approach was coupled with, according to noted tennis coach Nick Bollettieri, a respect that meant that neither Price nor Richard Williams raised their voices to their daughters. Journalist Bonnie D. Ford has said that the longevity exhibited by the Williams sisters is directly attributable to their parents and the way that Richard Williams and Price have helped them manage their careers and lives. Ford believes it is especially admirable that Price and her former husband have continued to remain jointly supportive despite their separation.
