= Philip Burke =

American caricature artist (born 1956)

- Born: 1956 (age 69–70); Buffalo, New York, U.S.
- Education: University of Toronto
- Known for: caricature portraits, illustrations
- Notable work: Andy Warhol; Rolling Stone covers (1989–1996)

Philip Burke (born 1956 in Buffalo, New York) is an American caricature artist and illustrator, known for his vivid portraits that appeared in the pages of Rolling Stone magazine for almost a decade. Burke's work extends beyond the likes of contemporary musicians; often serving as a chronicle of the political and social undercurrent on the pages of Vanity Fair, Time, Vogue or The New Yorker and others.

== Life ==
Burke was born in Buffalo, New York in 1956. He was brought up in a strict Catholic home and was baptized by his great uncle Joseph A. Burke, Bishop of the Buffalo Catholic Diocese. His first dabbling with caricatures date back to 1971, while a high school sophomore. Philip left Buffalo for the University of Toronto in 1974 where he drew caricatures for the university newspaper during his time there. Although he lost interest in academics, he packed up his portfolio and headed for New York City to pursue a career as an illustrator. Living in the West Village, he began drawing pen and ink caricatures for the Village Voice and various other publications. In 1982 Burke was shifting gears and began painting with oils. He signed an exclusive contract with the newly formed Vanity Fair magazine. A year later, Burke returned to his hometown, Buffalo, New York where he got married and started a family.

== Work ==
Andy Warhol became a fan of Burke's art after seeing his illustrations inVanity Fair. Burke bumped into Warhol on a New York street and the two became friends. After a year Burke got up enough courage to ask Warhol if he could paint him, and he agreed.

By 1989 Burke's paintings of contemporary musicians began being featured on the pages of Rolling Stone magazine. Every 2 weeks the table of contents would showcase a Philip Burke interpretation of the person behind the music.

In the late 1990s, Burke's work would appear on the covers of Time magazine, and continues to be published in The New Yorker, Vanity fair and GQ.

When Tina Brown became editor of The New Yorker, she brought in Burke to work for her. Patricia Bradbury, former Art Director of Newsweek Magazine said "He is just phenomenal, he does the best caricatures I've seen, there is nobody else like him". New York Times art director Steven Heller says "Burke has changed the art form. He uses paint in a way that no other cartoonist I know uses it and in fact breaks from the tradition of caricature.

Burke's work has been exhibited in a partnership with the Rock and Roll Hall of Fame in Cleveland, Ohio. The exhibit, The Color of Rock: The Art of Philip Burke, was on view at the Rock Hall from November 2006 to April 2007. The exhibit now travels throughout the United States. His original works, mainly in oil, encompass canvases from 40 inches to 12 feet in length. His subject matter has included rock performers, royalty, newsworthy politicos and entertainers from all over the globe.

His work can also be viewed in the traveling Rock & Roll Hall of Fame exhibit, featured galleries throughout the US and on occasion in a "live painting" where the artist himself embellishes original or limited edition reproductions of his art.

Burke's subjects range from politicos and media personalities, to athletes and musicians. Most notably his recent work featuring prominent players in the 2008 election serve as a historical reference: Barack Obama, George W. Bush, Hillary Clinton, Ted Kennedy and John McCain.

Philip Burke is an artist whose work has been selected for shows and exhibits by artist's organizations such as Society of Illustrators, Society of Publication Design and Society of Newspaper Design. Philip's artwork has been highlighted in several books, including The Savage Mirror in 1993 and Rolling Stone; The Illustrated Portraits in 2000.

In 2002, Burke's passion for rock and roll was displayed in an eight-foot guitar on which he depicted Pete Townshend on one side and Shirley Manson on the other. The guitar, which was Rolling Stone's entry into Cleveland's Guitar Mania exhibit, was dubbed "Smash Hit" and displayed upside down, being held by steel arms about to smash it to the floor. The guitar was on display at the Rock and Roll Hall of Fame until it sold at a United Way auction for $30,000.00. There's a lot of rock and roll in Philip Burke and a lot of Philip Burke in rock and roll.

In 2019 a 24 x 48-foot mural depicting Goo Goo Dolls' members John Rzeznik and Robby Takac was painted by Burke. The mural is located at 1212 Hertel Avenue, Buffalo, New York.

On April 1, 2020, Niagara University announced that the Castellani Art Museum had received a donation of Burke's caricature portrait of Henry Kissinger from curator, educator, artist, and collector Gerald C. Mead Jr.

== Exhibitions ==
- Burchfield Penney Art Center, Buffalo, NY – April 10 – September 13, 2015, "The Likeness of Being: Portraits by Philip Burke"
- Carriage Barns Arts Center, New Canaan, CT – January 31, 2013, "The Many Faces of Philip Burke"
- Muzeo, Anaheim, California – January 8 – April 12, 2009, "The Color of Rock"; The art of Philip Burke.
- Symbolic Gallery, New York, NY – November 14 – December 14, 2008, "Face Nation"; In association with the New York observer showcasing a variety of political work highlighting the 2008 Presidential Election.
- Society of Illustrators Political Show, New York, NY – September–October 2008, Six pieces were chosen for this exhibit: Barack Obama, Hillary Clinton (2) and John McCain.
- Society of Illustrators Advertising Show, New York, NY – 2008, Chosen for the 2008 Society of Illustrators Advertising show in NYC is Philip Burke's "Rudy Giuliani" done as part of the Burke Madison Collection and "The Cougar" done for Cougar Paper Company.
- Discovery World at Pier Wisconsin, Milwaukee – June 24 – September 23, 2007, "The Color of Rock"; The art of Philip Burke.
- Lee Hayden Gallery, West Lake, Ohio – June 15–30, 2007, "The Art of Philip Burke"; Exclusive limited edition prints
- Rock and Roll Hall of Fame, Cleveland, Ohio – November 15, 2006 – April 15, 2007, "Color of Rock"
- Society of Illustrators News – 2007, Tom Petty, Donald Rumsfeld and Russell Crowe for 2007's Editorial show. Rumsfeld received a Gold Medal Award. Steven Tyler was chosen by Society of Illustrators to be shown in the Advertising section of the 2007 show.
- Hus Var Art Gallery, Buffalo, New York – December 2004 – January 2005, The Hus Var Art Gallery showcases "Cause Celeb"; Showcasing a selection of Burke's Icon Collection.
- Rock and Roll Hall of Fame – Cleveland, Ohio- May 2002 – September 2002, "Guitar Mania" Philip Burke, Frank V. Coppola
- Miller Gallery Cincinnati, Ohio – May 1997, "Artistic License – 3 Styles of Caricature"
- The Walters Art Museum, Baltimore, Maryland – June 1995 – January 1996, "Worth a Thousand Words: a Picture of Contemporary Satire"
- Museum of Modern Art, Rome, Italy – June 9, 1994 – June 1, 1995, "New Pop", Traveling
- Gallery 1100, Buffalo, New York – October 1994
- Artik Gallery, Beverly Hills, California, – September–December 1991, "Icon Iconograph Iconoclasm"

== Publications ==
- The New York Times, Obama: The Historic Journey, 2009. Callaway, New York, New York.
- Rolling Stone: The Illustrated Portraits, 2000. Rolling Stone Press. Chronicle Books, San Francisco, California.
- Heller, S., 1993. The Savage Mirror: The Art of Contemporary Caricature. Watson-Guptill, NY, NY.
