= Williams sisters =

Doubles partnership between Venus and Serena Williams

Venus and Serena
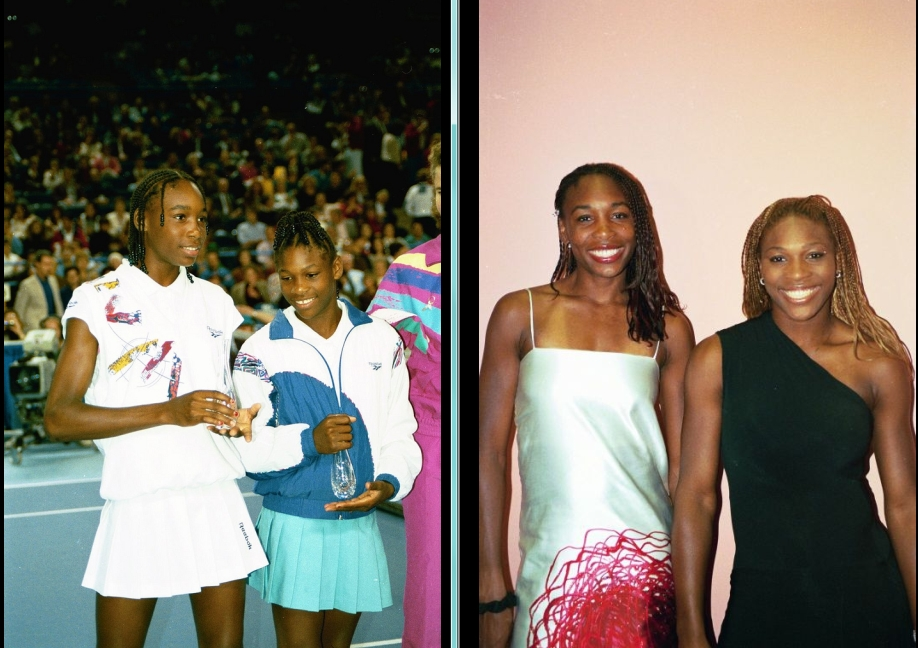
	Venus	Serena
Highest singles ranking:	No. 1 (February 25, 2002)	No. 1 (July 8, 2002)
Highest doubles ranking:	No. 1 (June 7, 2010)	No. 1 (June 7, 2010)
Women's singles titles:	49	73
Women's doubles titles:	22	23
Grand Slam; Women's singles titles:	7 (Wimbledon 2000/01/05/07/08, US Open 2000/01)	23 (Aus Open 2003/05/07/09/10/15/17, French Open 2002/13/15, Wimbledon 2002/03/09/10/12/15/16, US Open 1999/2002/08/12/13/14)
Grand Slam; Women's doubles titles:	14 (Aus Open 2001/03/09/10, French Open 1999/2010, Wimbledon 2000/02/08/09/12/16, US Open 1999/2009)	14 (Aus Open 2001/03/09/10, French Open 1999/2010, Wimbledon 2000/02/08/09/12/16, US Open 1999/2009)
Grand Slam mixed doubles titles:	2 (Aus Open 1998, French Open 1998)	2 (Wimbledon 1998, US Open 1998)
Summer Olympics; Singles titles:	Gold (Sydney 2000)	Gold (London 2012)
Summer Olympics; Doubles titles:	Gold (Sydney 2000, Beijing 2008, London 2012)	Gold (Sydney 2000, Beijing 2008, London 2012)
Fed Cup titles:	1 (1999)	1 (1999)
Plays:	Right-handed (two-handed backhand)	Right-handed (two-handed backhand)
Career Earnings:	$42,280,540 (2nd)	$94,518,971 (1st)

The Williams sisters are two American professional tennis players: Venus Williams (born 1980), a seven-time major singles champion, and Serena Williams (born 1981), a 23-time major singles champion, both of whom were coached from an early age by their parents Richard Williams and Oracene Price.

Tennis has not been open to female participation in the past. When the sport was introduced as a form of leisurely activity in the United States, “many clubs would not allow women to be members”. The Williams sisters' careers and status as successful African American athletes within a historically White sport, in spite of openly racist backlash they encountered during their careers, has been credited with opening up the sport of tennis to a more multicultural audience.

Outside the tennis, both sisters have developed successful ventures that promote empowerment and diversity. Venus launched her EleVen fashion brand, while Serena founded Serena Ventures, an investment firm that supports women led business and entrepreneurs of color. Their work off the court reflects their influence as leaders and role models for young athletes around the world.

Both sisters have been ranked by the Women's Tennis Association at the world No. 1 position in both singles and doubles. In 2002, after the French Open, Venus and Serena Williams were ranked world No. 1 and No. 2 on singles, respectively, marking the first time in history that sisters occupied the top two positions. On 21 June 2010, Serena and Venus again held the No. 1 and No. 2 rankings spots in singles, respectively, some eight years after first accomplishing this feat. At the time, Serena was three months shy of her 29th birthday and Venus had just celebrated her 30th birthday.

There was a noted professional rivalry between the sisters in singles — between the 2001 US Open and the 2017 Australian Open, they contested nine major finals. They became the first two players, female or male, to contest four consecutive major singles finals, from the 2002 French Open to the 2003 Australian Open; Serena famously won all four to complete the first of two "Serena Slams" (non-calendar year Grand Slams). Between 2000 and 2016, they collectively won 12 Wimbledon singles titles (Venus five, and Serena seven). Nonetheless, they remain very close, often watching each other's matches in support, even after one of them had been knocked out of a tournament.

By winning the 2001 Australian Open doubles title, they became the fifth pair of women to complete the career Grand Slam in doubles, and the first pair to complete the career Golden Slam in doubles. At the time, Venus and Serena were only 20 and 19 years old, respectively. Since then, they went on to add another two Olympic gold medals at the 2008 Beijing Olympics and the 2012 London Olympics. Moreover, the duo achieved a non-calendar year Grand Slam in doubles between 2009 Wimbledon and 2010 Roland Garros, which made them the co-No. 1 doubles players on 7 June 2010. Their last major doubles title came at the 2016 Wimbledon Championships.

Both players won four gold medals at the Olympics, one each in singles and three in doubles—all won together—the most of any tennis players. Venus also won a silver in mixed doubles at the 2016 Rio Olympics. As a duo, they completed the double career Golden Slam in doubles. Between the two of them, they have completed the Boxed Set, winning all four major events in singles, women's doubles, and mixed doubles; they split the four mixed doubles titles in 1998.

Winner — Legend Grand Slam tournaments (14–0) Olympic Gold (3) WTA Tour Championships (0–0) Premier Mandatory & Premier 5 (2–0) Premier (2–1) International (1–0)	Finals by Surface Hard (10–1) Grass (7–0) Clay (3–0) Carpet (2–0)

Result	No.	Date	Tournaments	Surface	Opponents	Score
Win	1.	February 23, 1998	Oklahoma City, United States (1)	Hard	(Romania) Cătălina Cristea (Australia) Kristine Kunce	7–5, 6–2
Win	2.	October 12, 1998	Zürich, Switzerland (1)	Carpet	(South Africa) Mariaan de Swardt (Ukraine) Elena Tatarkova	5–7, 6–1, 6–3
Win	3.	February 15, 1999	Hanover, Germany (1)	Carpet	(France) Alexandra Fusai (France) Nathalie Tauziat	5–7, 6–2, 6–2
Win	4.	May 24, 1999	French Open, Paris, France (1)	Clay	(Switzerland) Martina Hingis (Russia) Anna Kournikova	6–3, 6–7^{(2–7)}, 8–6
Loss	1.	August 8, 1999	San Diego, U.S. (1)	Hard	(United States) Lindsay Davenport (United States) Corina Morariu	4–6, 1–6
Win	5.	August 30, 1999	US Open, New York City, U.S. (1)	Hard	(United States) Chanda Rubin (France) Sandrine Testud	4–6, 6–1, 6–4
Win	6.	June 26, 2000	Wimbledon, London, United Kingdom (1)	Grass	(France) Julie Halard-Decugis (Japan) Ai Sugiyama	6–3, 6–2
Win	7.	September 18, 2000	Summer Olympics, Sydney, Australia (1)	Hard	(Netherlands) Kristie Boogert (Netherlands) Miriam Oremans	6–1, 6–1
Win	8.	January 15, 2001	Australian Open, Melbourne, Australia (1)	Hard	(United States) Lindsay Davenport (United States) Corina Morariu	6–2, 4–6, 6–4
Win	9.	June 24, 2002	Wimbledon, London, U.K. (2)	Grass	(Spain) Virginia Ruano Pascual (Argentina) Paola Suárez	6–2, 7–5
Win	10.	January 13, 2003	Australian Open, Melbourne, Australia (2)	Hard	(Spain) Virginia Ruano Pascual (Argentina) Paola Suárez	4–6, 6–4, 6–3
Win	11.	July 5, 2008	Wimbledon, London, U.K. (3)	Grass	(United States) Lisa Raymond (Australia) Samantha Stosur	6–2, 6–2
Win	12.	August 17, 2008	Summer Olympics, Beijing, China (2)	Hard	(Spain) Anabel Medina Garrigues (Spain) Virginia Ruano Pascual	6–2, 6–0
Win	13.	January 30, 2009	Australian Open, Melbourne, Australia (3)	Hard	(Japan) Ai Sugiyama (Slovakia) Daniela Hantuchová	6–3, 6–3
Win	14.	July 4, 2009	Wimbledon, London, U.K. (4)	Grass	(Australia) Samantha Stosur (Australia) Rennae Stubbs	7–6^{(7–4)}, 6–4
Win	15.	August 2, 2009	Stanford, U.S. (1)	Hard	(Chinese Taipei) Chan Yung-jan (Romania) Monica Niculescu	6–4, 6–1
Win	16.	September 14, 2009	US Open, New York City, U.S. (2)	Hard	(Zimbabwe) Cara Black (United States) Liezel Huber	6–2, 6–2
Win	17.	January 29, 2010	Australian Open, Melbourne, Australia (4)	Hard	(Zimbabwe) Cara Black (United States) Liezel Huber	6–4, 6–3
Win	18.	May 15, 2010	Madrid, Spain (1)	Clay	(Argentina) Gisela Dulko (Italy) Flavia Pennetta	6–2, 7–5
Win	19.	June 3, 2010	French Open, Paris, France (2)	Clay	(Czech Republic) Květa Peschke (Slovenia) Katarina Srebotnik	6–2, 6–3
Win	20.	July 7, 2012	Wimbledon, London, U.K. (5)	Grass	(Czech Republic) Andrea Hlaváčková (Czech Republic) Lucie Hradecká	7–5, 6–4
Win	21.	August 5, 2012	Summer Olympics, London, U.K. (3)	Grass	(Czech Republic) Andrea Hlaváčková (Czech Republic) Lucie Hradecká	6–4, 6–4
Win	22.	July 9, 2016	Wimbledon, London, U.K. (6)	Grass	(Hungary) Tímea Babos (Kazakhstan) Yaroslava Shvedova	6–3, 6–4

== Team competition finals: 1 (1 titles) ==
Outcome	No.	Date	Championship	Surface	Partners	Opponent	Score
Winner	1.	September 18–19, 1999	Fed Cup, Stanford, US	Hard	(United States) Lindsay Davenport (United States) Monica Seles	(Russia) Elena Makarova (Russia) Elena Likhovtseva (Russia) Elena Dementieva	4–1

== Performance timelines ==
=== Women's doubles ===
Key
W	F	SF	QF	#R	RR	Q#	P#	DNQ	A	Z#	PO	G	S	B	NMS	NTI	P	NH

(W) winner; (F) finalist; (SF) semifinalist; (QF) quarterfinalist; (#R) rounds 4, 3, 2, 1; (RR) round-robin stage; (Q#) qualification round; (P#) preliminary round; (DNQ) did not qualify; (A) absent; (Z#) Davis/Fed Cup Zonal Group (with number indication) or (PO) play-off; (G) gold, (S) silver or (B) bronze Olympic/Paralympic medal; (NMS) not a Masters tournament; (NTI) not a Tier I tournament; (P) postponed; (NH) not held; (SR) strike rate (events won / competed); (W–L) win–loss record.
To avoid confusion and double counting, these charts are updated at the conclusion of a tournament or when the player's participation has ended.

Tournament	1997	1998	1999	2000	2001	2002	2003	2004	2005	2006	2007	2008	2009	2010	2011	2012	2013	2014	2015	2016	2017	2018	2019	2020	2021	2022	Career W–L
Grand Slam tournaments
Australian Open	A	3R	SF	A	W	A	W	Absent				QF	W	W	Absent		QF	Absent									36–4
French Open	Absent		W	Absent									3R	W	Absent					3R	A	3R	Absent				17–3
Wimbledon	A	1R	A	W	3R	W	3R	Absent			2R	W	W	QF	A	W	A	2R	A	W	Absent						45–5
US Open	1R	A	W	SF	3R	Absent							W	Absent		3R	SF	QF	Absent							1R	25–7
Win–loss	0–1	2–1	16–1	10–0	10–1	6–0	8–1	0–0	0–0	0–0	1–0	9–1	20–1	14–1	0–0	8–1	7–2	4–2	0–0	8–1	0–0	2–1	0–0	0–0	0–0	0–1	125–15
Olympic Games
Summer Olympics	Not Held			G	Not Held			A	Not Held			G	Not Held			G	Not Held			1R	Not Held				A	Not Held	15–1
Year-end championships
WTA Finals	Did not qualify		A	Did not qualify									SF	A	Did not qualify												0–1

- Neither withdrawals nor walkovers are included in wins and losses.

Note: Serena Williams did not play at the 2004 Olympics because of injury. Venus partnered with American Chanda Rubin and lost in the first round to eventual gold-medalists Sun Tiantian and Li Ting.

== Boycott of the Indian Wells Open ==
During the 2001 Indian Wells Open tournament in Indian Wells, California, Venus Williams withdrew four minutes prior to her semifinal match with her sister Serena.

The following day, Serena played Kim Clijsters in the final. As Richard Williams and Venus made their way to their seats, the crowd booed, and some spectators yelled verbal jabs. Serena was booed often during the match, which she won 4–6, 6–4, 6–2, and the booing continued into the presentation ceremony.

Richard accused the crowds at Indian Wells of overt racism, saying, "The white people at Indian Wells, what they've been wanting to say all along to us finally came out: 'Nigger, stay away from here, we don't want you here'". When Venus was asked about her father's statements, she said, "I heard what he heard." Oracene Price (mother and coach of Venus and Serena) accused the crowd of "taking off their hoods".

=== Effects and criticism ===
After the initial controversy, neither Williams sister played the tournament in Indian Wells for 14 years. Between 2009 and 2019, the Women's Tennis Association classified the Indian Wells tournament as a Premier Mandatory event for all eligible players. Exceptions were made when players engage in tournament promotions, but Venus and Serena both declined to promote the tournament; WTA Tour CEO Larry Scott agreed he would not, promotionally, "put them in a position that is going to be awkward", and tournament director Charlie Pasarell has stated he would accept the WTA tour's ruling.

Allegations had been made before Venus's withdrawal that Richard Williams decided who won the matches between his daughters. Those allegations continued and increased as a result of her withdrawal.

Richard has said that racial epithets were used against him and Venus as they sat in the stands during the final.

Serena discusses what happened in her view at Indian Wells in detail in an entire chapter titled "The Fiery Darts of Indian Wells" in her 2009 autobiography, On the Line. She says that on the morning of the semifinal, Venus told the tour trainer that she had injured her knee and didn't think she could play and tried for hours to get approval from the trainer to withdraw, but the tournament officials kept stalling.

What got me most of all was that it wasn't just a scattered bunch of boos. It wasn't coming from just one section. It was like the whole crowd got together and decided to boo all at once. The ugliness was just raining down on me, hard. I didn't know what to do. Nothing like this had ever happened to me. What was most surprising about this uproar was the fact that tennis fans are typically a well-mannered bunch. They're respectful. They sit still. And in Palm Springs, especially, they tended to be pretty well-heeled, too. But I looked up and all I could see was a sea of rich people—mostly older, mostly white—standing and booing lustily, like some kind of genteel lynch mob. I don't mean to use such inflammatory language to describe the scene, but that's really how it seemed from where I was down on the court. Like these people were gonna come looking for me after the match. ... There was no mistaking that all of this was meant for me. I heard the word nigger a couple times, and I knew. I couldn't believe it. That's just not something you hear in polite society on that stadium court ... Just before the start of play, my dad and Venus started walking down the aisle to the players' box by the side of the court, and everybody turned and started to point and boo at them ... It was mostly just a chorus of boos, but I could still hear shouts of 'Nigger!' here and there. I even heard one angry voice telling us to go back to Compton. It was unbelievable ... We refused to return to Indian Wells. Even now, all these years later, we continue to boycott the event. It's become a mandatory tournament on the tour, meaning that the WTA can fine a player if she doesn't attend. But I don't care if they fine me a million dollars, I will not play there again.

However, on February 3, 2015, Serena Williams wrote an exclusive column for Time magazine stating her intentions to return to Indian Wells for a tournament on March 9, 2015. She did indeed return and won her opening match. Williams withdrew before her semi-final match with Simona Halep because of a knee injury.

The WTA announced on January 27, 2016, that Venus would return to Indian Wells for the first time in 15 years.

== Best result in Grand Slam singles (combined) ==
Key
W	F	SF	QF	#R	RR	Q#	DNQ	A	NH

(W) winner; (F) finalist; (SF) semifinalist; (QF) quarterfinalist; (#R) rounds 4, 3, 2, 1; (RR) round-robin stage; (Q#) qualification round; (DNQ) did not qualify; (A) absent; (NH) not held; (SR) strike rate (events won / competed); (W–L) win–loss record.
To avoid confusion and double counting, these charts are updated at the conclusion of a tournament or when the player's participation has ended.

W

(W) Won tournament: final contested by the Williams sisters.

Tournament	1997	1998	1999	2000	2001	2002	2003	2004	2005	2006	2007	2008	2009	2010	2011	2012	2013	2014	2015	2016	2017	2018	2019	2020	2021	2022	2023	2024	2025	2026	SR
Australian Open	A	QF^{V}	QF^{V}	4R^{S}	SF^{V}	QF^{V}	W^{S}	3R^{V}	W^{S}	3R^{S}	W^{S}	QF^{SV}	W^{S}	W^{S}	3R^{V}	4R^{S}	QF^{S}	4R^{S}	W^{S}	F^{S}	W^{S}	1R^{V}	QF^{S}	3R^{S}	SF^{S}	A	A	A	A	1R^{V}	7 / 25
French Open	2R^{V}	QF^{V}	4R^{V}	QF^{V}	QF^{S}	W^{S}	SF^{S}	QF^{SV}	3R^{V}	QF^{V}	QF^{S}	3R^{SV}	QF^{S}	QF^{S}	A	2R^{V}	W^{S}	2R^{SV}	W^{S}	F^{S}	4R^{V}	4R^{S}	3R^{S}	2R^{S}	4R^{S}	A	A	A	A	A	3 / 23
Wimbledon	1R^{V}	QF^{V}	QF^{V}	W^{V}	W^{V}	W^{S}	W^{S}	F^{S}	W^{V}	3R^{V}	W^{V}	W^{V}	W^{S}	W^{S}	4R^{SV}	W^{S}	4R^{S}	3R^{SV}	W^{S}	W^{S}	F^{V}	F^{S}	F^{S}	NH	2R^{V}	1R^{S}	1R^{V}	A	A	1R^{S}	12 / 27
US Open	F^{V}	SF^{V}	W^{S}	W^{V}	W^{V}	W^{S}	A	QF^{S}	QF^{V}	4R^{S}	SF^{V}	W^{S}	SF^{S}	SF^{V}	F^{S}	W^{S}	W^{S}	W^{S}	SF^{S}	SF^{S}	SF^{V}	F^{S}	F^{S}	SF^{S}	A	3R^{S}	1R^{V}	A	1R^{V}		8 / 25

== Year-end WTA ranking ==
Player	1995	1996	1997	1998	1999	2000	2001	2002	2003	2004	2005	2006	2007	2008	2009	2010	2011	2012	2013	2014	2015	2016	2017	2018	2019	2020	2021	2022	2023	2024	2025
Venus	205	216	22	5	3	3	3	2	11	9	10	46	8	6	6	5	102	24	49	18	7	17	5	40	53	78	318	1010	407	970	572
Serena			99	20	4	6	6	1	3	7	11	95	7	2	1	4	12	3	1	1	1	2	22	16	10	11	41				

== See also ==
- Klitschko brothers – similarly dominant boxing brothers
- Women's tennis in the United States
- Sports dynasty

Sporting positions
Preceded by (United States) Liezel Huber	World No. 1 (doubles); June 7, 2010 – August 1, 2010	Succeeded by (United States) Liezel Huber
Awards and achievements
Preceded by (Switzerland) Martina Hingis & (Russia) Anna Kournikova (Zimbabwe) Cara Black & (United States) Liezel Huber	WTA Doubles Team of the Year; 2000; 2009	Succeeded by (United States) Lisa Raymond & (Australia) Rennae Stubbs (Argentina) Gisela Dulko & (Italy) Flavia Pennetta
Preceded by (Zimbabwe) Cara Black & (United States) Liezel Huber	ITF Women's doubles world champion 2009	Succeeded by (Argentina) Gisela Dulko & (Italy) Flavia Pennetta
Preceded by First Award (Russia) Maria Kirilenko & (Belarus) Victoria Azarenka	WTA Fan Favorite Doubles Team of the Year; 2010; 2012	Succeeded by (Russia) Maria Kirilenko & (Belarus) Victoria Azarenka (Russia) Ekaterina Makarova & (Russia) Elena Vesnina
