= King Richard (film) =

2021 sports drama film by Reinaldo Marcus Green

- Theatrical release poster
- Directed by: Reinaldo Marcus Green
- Written by: Zach Baylin
- Produced by: Tim White; Trevor White; Will Smith; Jon Mone
- Starring: Will Smith; Aunjanue Ellis; Saniyya Sidney; Demi Singleton; Tony Goldwyn; Jon Bernthal
- Cinematography: Robert Elswit
- Edited by: Pamela Martin
- Music by: Kris Bowers
- Production companies: Westbrook Studios; Star Thrower Entertainment; Keepin' It Reel
- Distributed by: Warner Bros. Pictures
- Release dates: September 2, 2021 (Telluride); November 19, 2021 (United States)
- Running time: 145 minutes
- Country: United States
- Language: English
- Budget: $50 million
- Box office: $39.4 million

King Richard is a 2021 American biographical sports drama film directed by Reinaldo Marcus Green and written by Zach Baylin. The film stars Will Smith as Richard Williams, the father and coach of famed tennis players Venus and Serena Williams (both of whom served as executive producers on the film), with Aunjanue Ellis, Saniyya Sidney, Demi Singleton, Tony Goldwyn, and Jon Bernthal in supporting roles.

It premiered at the 48th Telluride Film Festival on September 2, 2021, and was theatrically released on November 19, 2021, by Warner Bros. Pictures and on the HBO Max streaming service. Although it was a box office failure, grossing $39.4 million against a budget of $50 million, the film received positive reviews from critics, with praise for the screenplay and the performances of Smith, Ellis, and Sidney.

It was named one of the ten best films of the year by both the American Film Institute and the National Board of Review. It earned six nominations at the 94th Academy Awards, including Best Picture, and won Best Actor for Will Smith.

== Plot ==
Richard Williams lives in Compton, California, with his wife Brandy, his three step-daughters Tunde, Isha and Lyndrea, and his two daughters, Venus and Serena. Richard aspires to turn Venus and Serena into professional tennis players.

Richard has prepared a plan for their success since before they were born. He and Brandy coach Venus and Serena on a daily basis, while also working as a security guard and a nurse, respectively. Richard works tirelessly to find a professional coach for the girls, creating brochures and videotapes to advertise their skills, but has not had success.

One day, Richard takes the girls to see coach Paul Cohen, who is in the middle of practicing with John McEnroe and Pete Sampras. Despite his initial reservations, he agrees to watch the girls practice, and is impressed.

However, the Williamses cannot afford professional coaching, and Paul refuses to coach both girls for free. He selects Venus to receive his coaching, while Serena continues to practice with Brandy. Paul encourages Venus to participate in juniors tournaments. She quickly finds success, but Richard stresses to Venus and her sister that they should remain humble despite their success.

At one of Venus's tournaments, Serena also signs up to play, unbeknownst to Richard. As both girls continue to succeed, the family feel like outsiders among the predominantly white, upper-class competition. Richard meets with high-profile agents, but, fearing his daughters will be taken advantage of, pulls them out of the junior circuit entirely. Paul insists his decision will destroy the girls’ chances to turn pro, but Richard stands firm, firing him as a coach.

Coach Rick Macci travels to California to see the girls play. Impressed, he takes the girls on, and the family relocates to Florida to train at his facility. Richard surprises Rick by reiterating that the girls will not play juniors, instead training and attending school like normal teenagers.

In the ensuing three years, questions arise from the media and from Rick about Richard's strategy with the girls and his desire for media exposure. Venus tells Rick that she wants to turn pro. Richard reluctantly agrees, but later reneges, worrying that she will suffer a similar fate to Rick's pupil Jennifer Capriati, who is allegedly suffering from burnout and has been arrested for drug possession.

The decision strains Richard's relationships with Venus, Brandy, and Rick. After an argument with Brandy, he reconciles with Venus, agreeing to let her play in the upcoming Bank of the West Classic in Oakland. Before the tournament, the family meets with a Nike executive, who offers them a major sponsorship deal worth 3 million dollars. Rick urges them to accept, but the family collectively agrees to decline, believing that once Venus begins to play she will attract more lucrative offers.

Venus initially struggles in her first professional match against Shaun Stafford, but eventually triumphs. She comes in as a heavy underdog in her next match against top-seeded Arantxa Sánchez Vicario. Venus takes the first set and leads in the second before Vicario takes an extended bathroom break, an apparent act of gamesmanship. Sánchez Vicario recovers to win the second set and the match.

Richard and Brandy comfort a dejected Venus, telling her to be proud. As the family leaves the stadium, a large crowd of supporters is waiting to cheer her on, and Rick tells Richard that several major shoe companies are anxious to meet with Venus.

== Cast ==
- Will Smith as Richard Williams
- Aunjanue Ellis-Taylor as Oracene "Brandy" Price
- Saniyya Sidney as Venus Williams
- Demi Singleton as Serena Williams
- Jon Bernthal as Rick Macci
- Tony Goldwyn as Paul Cohen
- Mikayla LaShae Bartholomew as Tunde Price
- Danielle Lawson as Isha Price
- Layla Crawford as Lyndrea Price
- Erika Ringor as Mrs. Strickland
- Dylan McDermott as George MacArthur
- Andy Bean as Laird Stabler
- Kevin Dunn as Vic Braden
- Craig Tate as Bells (Homeboy #1)
- Josiah Cross as TD (Homeboy #2)
- Calvin Clausell Jr. as Homeboy #3
- Vaughn W. Hebron as Homeboy #4
- Christopher Wallinger as John McEnroe
- Chase Del Rey as Pete Sampras
- Judith Chapman as Nancy Reagan
- Jessica Wacnik as Jennifer Capriati
- Katrina Begin as Anne (Women's Tennis Association CEO)
- Kaitlyn Christian as Shaun Stafford
- Marcela Zacarías as Arantxa Sánchez Vicario
- Rich Sommer as Patrick Dougherty
- Erin Cummings as Social Worker

Ayan Broomfield was the body double for select scenes of Venus Williams matches.

== Production ==
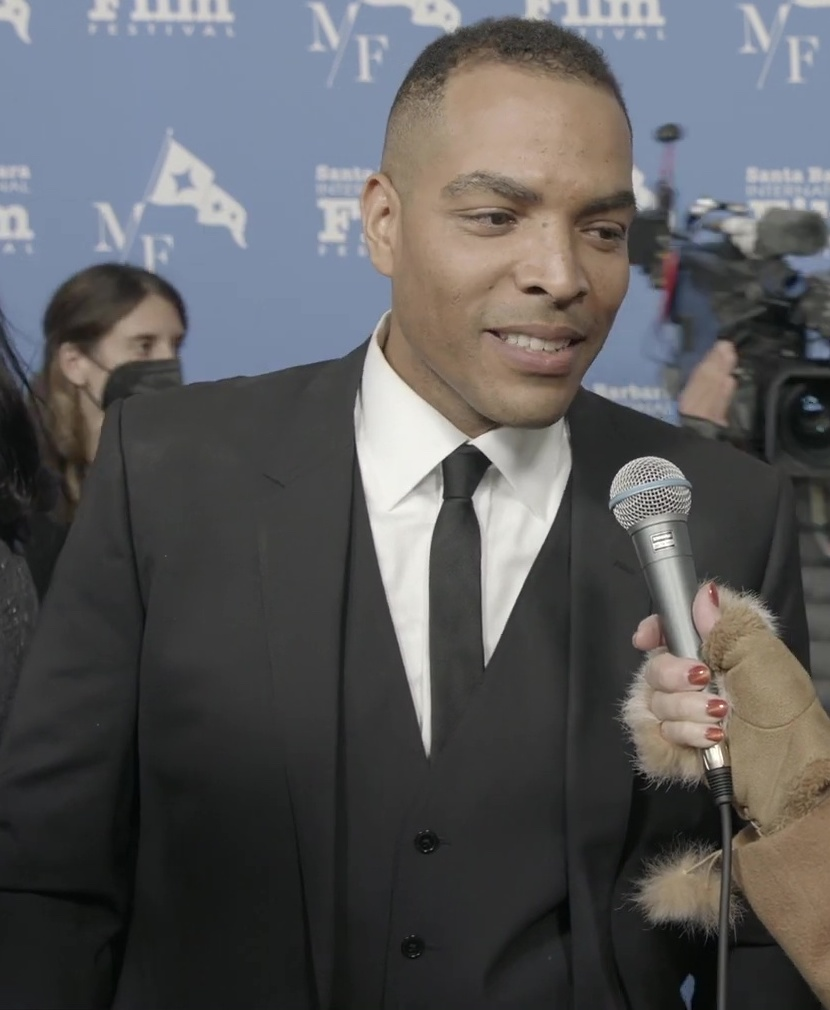
Reinaldo Marcus Green, the film's director

The project was announced in March 2019 with Will Smith set to play Williams, from Zach Baylin's screenplay, which appeared on the 2018 "Black List" of the most-liked unproduced screenplays. Smith was paid $40 million for his involvement. Warner Bros. Pictures was the successful bidder for the film. Reinaldo Marcus Green signed as director in June.

In January 2020, Demi Singleton and Saniyya Sidney were cast as Serena and Venus, and Aunjanue Ellis as their mother Oracene Price. Jon Bernthal also entered negotiations to play Rick Macci. In February, Liev Schreiber and Susie Abromeit (uncredited in the final film) joined the cast; and in March, Dylan McDermott, Katrina Begin and Judith Chapman. Some of the tennis scenes of a young Serena Williams in the film were played by American tennis player Thea Frodin.

Principal photography began in January 2020 in Los Angeles. According to the California Film Commission, the production spent $35.6 million in the state, with $7.5 million returned in tax credits. In March 2020, filming was halted due to the COVID-19 pandemic. In October 2020, Tony Goldwyn joined the cast, replacing Schreiber, who dropped out due to a scheduling conflict as a result of the pandemic. Filming resumed later that month.

Will Smith reportedly received $40 million for his role. When production concluded, he reportedly gave his co-stars "a nice bonus" via checks, due to the decision to release the film in theatres and on HBO Max simultaneously, on top of the compensation already received from the studio.

=== Music ===
Kris Bowers composed the film score, after previously working on Green's Monsters and Men (2018). He produced the musical score mostly through the help of a prepared piano, understanding how Venus and Serena changed the game of tennis, and used nails, ping pong balls and several other objects to use it as a percussive instrument along with drums. The film features the original song "Be Alive" by Beyoncé, released on November 12, 2021. The song was also included in the film's soundtrack, released by WaterTower Music on the same date.

== Release ==
The film premiered at the Telluride Film Festival on September 2, 2021, and was released on November 19, 2021, in theaters and on HBO Max. It was previously scheduled to be released on November 25, 2020, but it was delayed due to the COVID-19 pandemic. The film was chosen to close the AFI Fest on November 14, 2021; that same day, it closed the New Orleans Film Festival's live screenings. By the end of its run, it was also screened at film festivals in London, Chicago, Savannah, Miami, Indianapolis, Denver, Middleburg, Philadelphia, Sydney, Toruń, and Morelia. The film will also open the 25th American Black Film Festival (ABFF), with president and general manager Nicole Friday describing King Richard as "a film that is a touchstone of ABFF's legacy of showcasing extraordinary Black talent and inspiring storytelling reflecting the brilliance of diversity in Hollywood."

The film was released on Blu-ray and DVD February 8, 2022 by Warner Bros. Home Entertainment, with the 4K Ultra HD release through Studio Distribution Services on the same date.

== Reception ==
=== Audience viewership ===
Samba TV reported to Deadline Hollywood that the film was streamed by 707,000 U.S. households on HBO Max in its first 3 days of release on the platform. In addition, it stated that 59% of the viewers were female and 54% African Americans. HBO Max Executive Vice President and General Manager Andy Forssell praised the film for being watched without interruptions unlike other day-and-date titles, while Warner Bros. Pictures Chairman and Chief Content Officer Toby Emmerich stated that the company was pleased with the film's initial streaming performance. It was streamed by nearly 2 million U.S. households by the end of its first 30 days on HBO Max. By March 20, the film had been streamed in 2.6 million households in the United States, including 403,000 since the Oscar nomination announcements on February 8.

=== Box office ===
King Richard grossed $15.1 million in the United States and Canada, and $24.3 million in other territories, for a worldwide total of $39.4 million.

In the United States and Canada, the film was released alongside Ghostbusters: Afterlife, and was projected to gross $8–10 million from 3,250 theaters in its opening weekend. The film made $1.9 million on its first day, and went on to debut to $5.7 million. The low figure was attributed to the 145 minute runtime, as well as the film's availability on HBO Max. The film made $4.8 million over the five-day Thanksgiving frame, including $3.3 million (-33%) in its second weekend, finishing seventh. In its third weekend, the film earned $1.2 million, finishing ninth. King Richard dropped out of the box office top ten in its fourth weekend, earning $510,306 and finishing twelfth.

=== Venus and Serena Williams about the film ===
Both Venus and Serena are listed as executive producers on the film, a title they approved only after viewing the finished product. Serena said: "I think it was a great opportunity to see how amazing African-American fathers are. A lot of black men aren't seen in that light. And a lot of people think that my dad was a different character. He wanted us to have fun first over anything. That's the thing that I loved most." According to Serena and Venus, the film is as true to reality "as possible."

=== Arantxa Sánchez' reaction ===
While praising Will Smith's performance, Arantxa Sánchez expressed dissatisfaction at her portrayal as an antagonist in the film, stating that the real events had been different and that she had not taken the toilet break shown.

=== Critical response ===
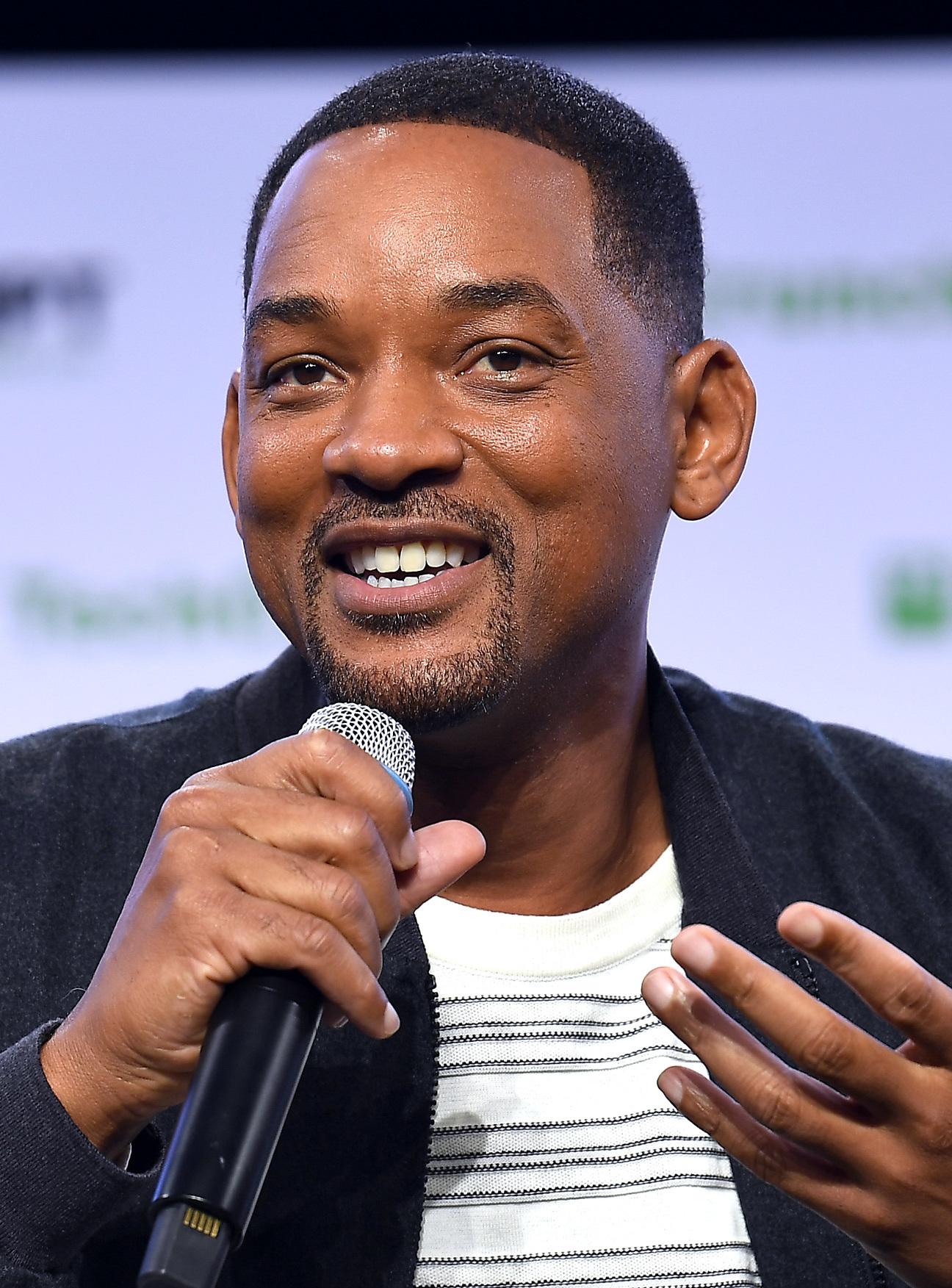
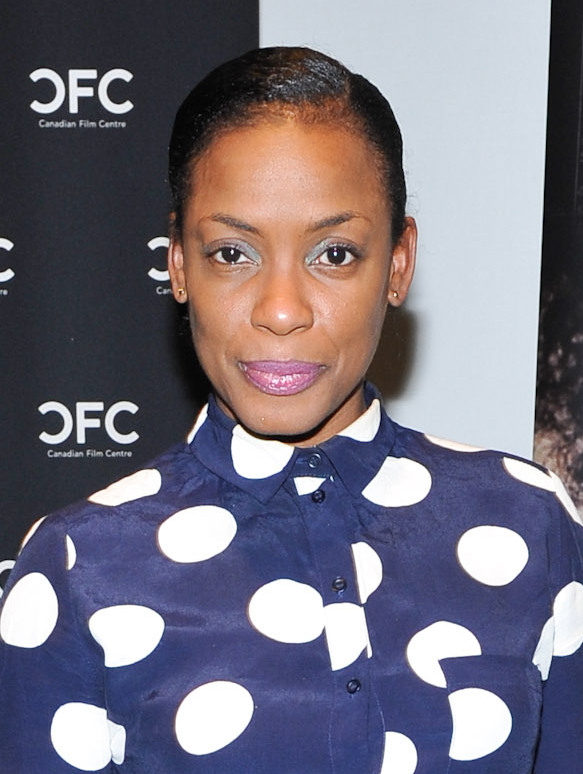
Will Smith and Aunjanue Ellis-Taylor received critical acclaim for their performances and earned Academy Award nominations for Best Actor and Best Supporting Actress, with Smith winning.

On the review aggregator website Rotten Tomatoes, 90% of 302 critics' reviews are positive, with an average rating of 7.6/10. The website's consensus reads: "King Richard transcends sport biopic formulas with refreshingly nuanced storytelling – and a towering performance from Will Smith in the title role." On Metacritic, the film has a weighted average score of 76 out of 100, based on 53 critics, indicating "generally favorable" reviews. Audiences polled by CinemaScore gave the film an average grade of "A" on an A+ to F scale, while those at PostTrak gave it a 94% positive score, with 89% saying they would definitely recommend it.

Kevin Maher of The Times gave the film four out of five stars, writing: "A towering turn from Will Smith, his best since Ali and one of the year's great screen performances, defines nearly every frame of this film." Justin Chang of the Los Angeles Times described the film as "an engrossing family drama that doubles as a sharp rethink of how a family operates within the overlapping, often overbearing spheres of race, class, sports and celebrity."

Joe Morgenstern of The Wall Street Journal criticized the film's length, but said that it was "a sports movie that transcends itself without losing track of itself." Wendy Ide of The Guardian gave the film four out of five stars, describing it as a "crowd-pleasing biopic" and writing: "Smith is excellent, fully inhabiting the character in one of the only roles to date that has required him to fully shed his habitual gloss of Will Smith charm."

Clarisse Loughrey of The Independent also praised Smith's performance, writing: "It's one of those impressive fusions between actor and character, which all comes across so effortlessly onscreen, but gives King Richard the lifeblood it needs to triumph as a film."

K. Austin Collins of Rolling Stone wrote: "The movie's brightest-burning idea, and it is sincerely moving, is that Richard, for his flaws, does what he does on behalf of the young black women he's raising. This rings true in real life and in fiction."

Allegra Frank of Slate was more critical of the film, writing: "Venus and Serena Williams are the names we rightly remember, but King Richard remains fixated on the male bravado that pushed for them to get their names out there in the first place." Kyle Smith of National Review wrote that the film "makes the sororal tennis champs seem almost incidental to their own rise to greatness." Jesse Hassenger of The A.V. Club gave the film a grade of C+, writing that it "keeps enough of Richard's messy past off screen to feel like a hagiography with a few concessions, rather than a true warts-and-all portrait."

=== Accolades ===
Award	Date of ceremony	Category	Recipient(s)	Result	Ref.
AACTA Awards	January 26, 2022	Best Lead Actor – International	Will Smith	Nominated	
Academy Awards	March 27, 2022	Best Picture	Tim White, Trevor White, and Will Smith	Nominated	
Academy Awards	March 27, 2022	Best Actor	Will Smith	Won	
Academy Awards	March 27, 2022	Best Supporting Actress	Aunjanue Ellis	Nominated	
Academy Awards	March 27, 2022	Best Original Screenplay	Zach Baylin	Nominated	
Academy Awards	March 27, 2022	Best Film Editing	Pamela Martin	Nominated	
Academy Awards	March 27, 2022	Best Original Song	DIXSON and Beyoncé Knowles-Carter for "Be Alive"	Nominated	
African-American Film Critics Association	January 18, 2022	Best Actor	Will Smith	Won	
African-American Film Critics Association	January 18, 2022	Best Supporting Actress	Aunjanue Ellis	Won	
African-American Film Critics Association	January 18, 2022	Best Breakout Actor	Saniyya Sidney	Won	
African-American Film Critics Association	January 18, 2022	Best Emerging Director	Reinaldo Marcus Green	Won	
Alliance of Women Film Journalists	January, 2022	Best Actor	Will Smith	Nominated	
Alliance of Women Film Journalists	January, 2022	Best Actress In A Supporting Role	Aunjanue Ellis	Nominated	
Alliance of Women Film Journalists	January, 2022	Best Ensemble Cast	Rich Delia and Avy Kaufman	Won	
ACE Eddie Awards	March 5, 2022	Best Edited Feature Film – Dramatic	Pamela Martin	Won	
American Film Institute (AFI)	December 8, 2021	Top Ten Films of the Year	King Richard	Won	
Black Reel Awards	February 27, 2022	Outstanding Film	King Richard	Won	
Black Reel Awards	February 27, 2022	Outstanding Director	Reinaldo Marcus Green	Nominated	
Black Reel Awards	February 27, 2022	Outstanding Actor	Will Smith	Won	
Black Reel Awards	February 27, 2022	Outstanding Supporting Actress	Aunjanue Ellis	Won	
Black Reel Awards	February 27, 2022	Outstanding Breakthrough Performance, Female	Saniyya Sidney	Nominated	
Black Reel Awards	February 27, 2022	Outstanding Breakthrough Performance, Female	Demi Singleton	Nominated	
Black Reel Awards	February 27, 2022	Outstanding Ensemble	King Richard	Nominated	
Black Reel Awards	February 27, 2022	Outstanding Original Song	"Be Alive" (Beyoncé and DIXSON)	Nominated	
Black Reel Awards	February 27, 2022	Outstanding Editing	Pamela Martin	Nominated	
British Academy Film Awards	March 13, 2022	Best Actor	Will Smith	Won	
British Academy Film Awards	March 13, 2022	Best Supporting Actress	Aunjanue Ellis	Nominated	
British Academy Film Awards	March 13, 2022	Best Original Screenplay	Zach Baylin	Nominated	
British Academy Film Awards	March 13, 2022	Best Casting	Rich Delia and Avy Kaufman	Nominated	
Chicago International Film Festival	October 26, 2021	Audience Choice Award for Feature Film	King Richard	Won	
Celebration of Black Cinema and Television	December 6, 2021	Actor – Film	Will Smith	Won	
Critics' Choice Movie Awards	March 13, 2022	Best Picture	King Richard	Nominated	
Critics' Choice Movie Awards	March 13, 2022	Best Actor	Will Smith	Won	
Critics' Choice Movie Awards	March 13, 2022	Best Supporting Actress	Aunjanue Ellis	Nominated	
Critics' Choice Movie Awards	March 13, 2022	Best Young Actor/Actress	Saniyya Sidney	Nominated	
Critics' Choice Movie Awards	March 13, 2022	Best Original Screenplay	Zach Baylin	Nominated	
Critics' Choice Movie Awards	March 13, 2022	Best Song	"Be Alive"	Nominated	
Dallas–Fort Worth Film Critics Association	December 20, 2021	Best Picture	King Richard	Nominated	
Dallas–Fort Worth Film Critics Association	December 20, 2021	Best Actor	Will Smith	Runner-up	
Dallas–Fort Worth Film Critics Association	December 20, 2021	Best Supporting Actress	Aunjanue Ellis	Nominated	
Denver Film Festival	November 4, 2021	Best Feature – Audience Choice Award	King Richard	Won	
Detroit Film Critics Society	December 6, 2021	Best Supporting Actor	Jon Bernthal	Won	
Detroit Film Critics Society	December 6, 2021	Best Film	King Richard	Nominated	
Detroit Film Critics Society	December 6, 2021	Best Actor	Will Smith	Nominated	
Detroit Film Critics Society	December 6, 2021	Best Supporting Actress	Aunjanue Ellis	Nominated	
Golden Globe Awards	January 9, 2022	Best Motion Picture – Drama	King Richard	Nominated	
Golden Globe Awards	January 9, 2022	Best Actor – Motion Picture Drama	Will Smith	Won	
Golden Globe Awards	January 9, 2022	Best Supporting Actress – Motion Picture	Aunjanue Ellis	Nominated	
Golden Globe Awards	January 9, 2022	Best Original Song	"Be Alive" (Beyoncé and DIXSON)	Nominated	
Golden Raspberry Awards	March 26, 2022	Razzie Redeemer Award	Will Smith	Won	
Heartland International Film Festival	October 18, 2021	Overall Audience Choice Award	King Richard	Won	
Heartland International Film Festival	October 18, 2021	Pioneering Spirit Award	Will Smith	Won	
Hollywood Critics Association Awards	February 28, 2022	Best Picture	King Richard	Nominated	
Hollywood Critics Association Awards	February 28, 2022	Best Actor	Will Smith	Nominated	
Hollywood Critics Association Awards	February 28, 2022	Best Supporting Actress	Aunjanue Ellis	Nominated	
Hollywood Critics Association Awards	February 28, 2022	Best Cast Ensemble	King Richard	Nominated	
Hollywood Critics Association Awards	February 28, 2022	Best Director	Reinaldo Marcus Green	Nominated	
Hollywood Critics Association Awards	February 28, 2022	Best Original Screenplay	Zach Baylin	Nominated	
Hollywood Critics Association Awards	February 28, 2022	Best Original Song	"Be Alive" (Beyoncé and DIXSON)	Won	
Hollywood Critics Association Awards	February 28, 2022	Best Film Editing	Pamela Martin	Nominated	
Hollywood Music in Media Awards	November 17, 2021	Best Original Song in a Feature Film	"Be Alive" (Beyoncé and DIXSON)	Nominated	
Houston Film Critics Society	February 19, 2022	Best Picture	King Richard	Nominated	
Houston Film Critics Society	February 19, 2022	Best Actor	Will Smith	Nominated	
Houston Film Critics Society	February 19, 2022	Best Supporting Actress	Aunjanue Ellis	Nominated	
Los Angeles Film Critics Association	December 13, 2021	Best Supporting Actress	Aunjanue Ellis	Runner-up	
Miami International Film Festival	November 11, 2021	Audience Award	King Richard	Won	
NAACP Image Awards	February 26, 2022	Outstanding Motion Picture	King Richard	Nominated	
NAACP Image Awards	February 26, 2022	Outstanding Directing in a Motion Picture	Reinaldo Marcus Green	Nominated	
NAACP Image Awards	February 26, 2022	Outstanding Actor in a Motion Picture	Will Smith	Won	
NAACP Image Awards	February 26, 2022	Outstanding Supporting Actress in a Motion Picture	Aunjanue Ellis	Nominated	
NAACP Image Awards	February 26, 2022	Outstanding Ensemble Cast in a Motion Picture	Jon Bernthal, Aunjanue Ellis, Tony Goldwyn, Saniyya Sidney, Demi Singleton, Will Smith	Nominated	
NAACP Image Awards	February 26, 2022	Outstanding Soul/R&B Song	"Be Alive" (Beyoncé and DIXSON)	Nominated	
National Board of Review Awards	December 2, 2021	Top Ten Film	King Richard	Won	
National Board of Review Awards	December 2, 2021	Best Actor	Will Smith	Won	
National Board of Review Awards	December 2, 2021	Best Supporting Actress	Aunjanue Ellis	Won	
Palm Springs International Film Festival	January 6, 2022	Ensemble Performance Award	Jon Bernthal, Aunjanue Ellis, Tony Goldwyn, Saniyya Sidney, Demi Singleton, Will Smith	Won	
Philadelphia Film Festival	November 3, 2021	Narrative Audience Award	King Richard	Won	
Producers Guild of America Awards	March 19, 2022	Best Theatrical Motion Picture	Tim White, Trevor White, Will Smith	Nominated	
Satellite Awards	April 2, 2022	Best Motion Picture – Drama	King Richard	Nominated	
Satellite Awards	April 2, 2022	Best Director	Reinaldo Marcus Green	Nominated	
Satellite Awards	April 2, 2022	Best Actor in a Motion Picture – Drama	Will Smith	Nominated	
Satellite Awards	April 2, 2022	Best Supporting Actress	Aunjanue Ellis	Nominated	
Satellite Awards	April 2, 2022	Best Original Screenplay	Zach Baylin	Nominated	
Satellite Awards	April 2, 2022	Best Film Editing	Pamela Martin	Nominated	
Satellite Awards	April 2, 2022	Best Original Song	"Be Alive" (Beyoncé and DIXSON)	Nominated	
SCAD Savannah Film Festival	October 30, 2021	Outstanding Achievement in Cinema Award	Aunjanue Ellis	Won	
Screen Actors Guild Awards	February 27, 2022	Outstanding Performance by a Male Actor in a Leading Role	Will Smith	Won	
Screen Actors Guild Awards	February 27, 2022	Outstanding Performance by a Cast in a Motion Picture	Jon Bernthal, Aunjanue Ellis, Tony Goldwyn, Saniyya Sidney, Demi Singleton, Will Smith	Nominated	
St. Louis Gateway Film Critics Association	December 12, 2021	Best Actor	Will Smith	Nominated	
St. Louis Gateway Film Critics Association	December 12, 2021	Best Supporting Actress	Aunjanue Ellis	Nominated	
Washington D.C. Area Film Critics Association Awards	December 6, 2021	Best Actor	Will Smith	Nominated	
Washington D.C. Area Film Critics Association Awards	December 6, 2021	Best Supporting Actress	Aunjanue Ellis	Won	
Washington D.C. Area Film Critics Association Awards	December 6, 2021	Best Original Screenplay	Zach Baylin	Nominated	
Washington D.C. Area Film Critics Association Awards	December 6, 2021	Best Youth Performance	Saniyya Sidney	Nominated	
Women Film Critics Circle	December 11, 2021	Best Actor	Will Smith	Won	
Women Film Critics Circle	December 11, 2021	Best Equality of the Sexes	King Richard	Won	
Writers Guild of America Awards	March 20, 2022	Best Original Screenplay	Zach Baylin	Nominated	
