= Rick Macci =

American tennis coach and former player (born 1954)

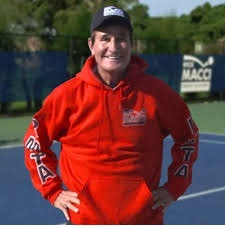
- Born: December 7, 1954 (age 71); Greenville, Ohio, U.S
- Occupation: USPTA Master Professional
- Years active: 1970-present

Rick Macci (born December 7, 1954) is an American tennis coach and former player. He is a United States Professional Tennis Association (USPTA) Master Professional, and seven-time USPTA national coach of the year who has trained five number one ranked players: Andy Roddick, Jennifer Capriati, Maria Sharapova, Serena Williams, and Venus Williams.

In 2010, he was inducted into the USPTA Florida Hall of Fame. He serves as a consultant on the USTA Player Development Program in Boca Raton, Florida.

In 2017, he was youngest ever to be inducted into the USPTA Hall of Fame.

== Education ==
Born in Greenville, Ohio, to parents Norma Macci and Santi Macci, Macci attended Greenville Senior High School and graduated in 1973. After two years at Wright State University, Rick was ranked as the top under-18 tennis player in Ohio. Macci went into the Hall of Fame induction honors for his accomplishments in basketball and tennis in his hometown.

== Career ==
In the early 1970s Macci started his career as the tennis pro at Bob Schul's Sports Complex in Troy, Ohio. In the late 1970s he became the tennis professional at the Sinnet Indoor Tennis Club in Vineland, New Jersey when in 1979 he achieved the #1 Ranked Adult player in New Jersey.

He started the Rick Macci International Tennis Academy in 1985, in Haines City, Florida, at the Grenelefe Golf & Tennis Resort, where two of his students were Tommy Ho and Jennifer Capriati In the summer of 1992, the Macci Academy moved to Delray Beach.

Over the course of his career, he coached many tennis players such as Venus Williams, Serena Williams, Andy Roddick, Tommy Ho, Maria Sharapova, Jennifer Capriati, Anastasia Myskina, Mary Pierce, Vince Spadea, Sofia Kenin, Hurricane Black, Bethanie Mattek-Sands, Victoria Duval, Christian Ruud, Sofia Belinksi, Vlada Hranchar, Darwin Blanch, Alycia Parks and Tristan Boyer.

Macci has appeared on several TV shows, such as Sixty Minutes, Today Show, Good Morning America, Inside Edition, Day One, and many major networks, CBS, NBC, ABC, CNN, USA, ESPN, Tennis Channel, BBC and sports talk radio shows around the world. He is the featured teaching pro on the award-winning instructional tennis videos (produced by the USPTA) that airs on the Tennis Channel. He has worked as tennis consultant for Donald Trump and T. Management.

Macci the recipient of the 2005 Alex Gordon Award for USPTA Professional of the Year.

== Honors ==
In 2010, Macci was inducted into the USPTA Florida Hall of Fame.

On 13 October 2017 Macci was inducted into the USPTA Hall of Fame USPTA Professionals to become the 19th professional honored, and youngest ever to be inducted.

== Family ==
Macci has three daughters, Ginger Macci, Lisa Macci and Farrah Macci.

== Popular culture ==
In the 2021 biographical film King Richard, about Venus and Serena Williams's father, Macci was portrayed by Jon Bernthal.
