= Richard Williams (tennis coach) =

American tennis coach (born 1942)

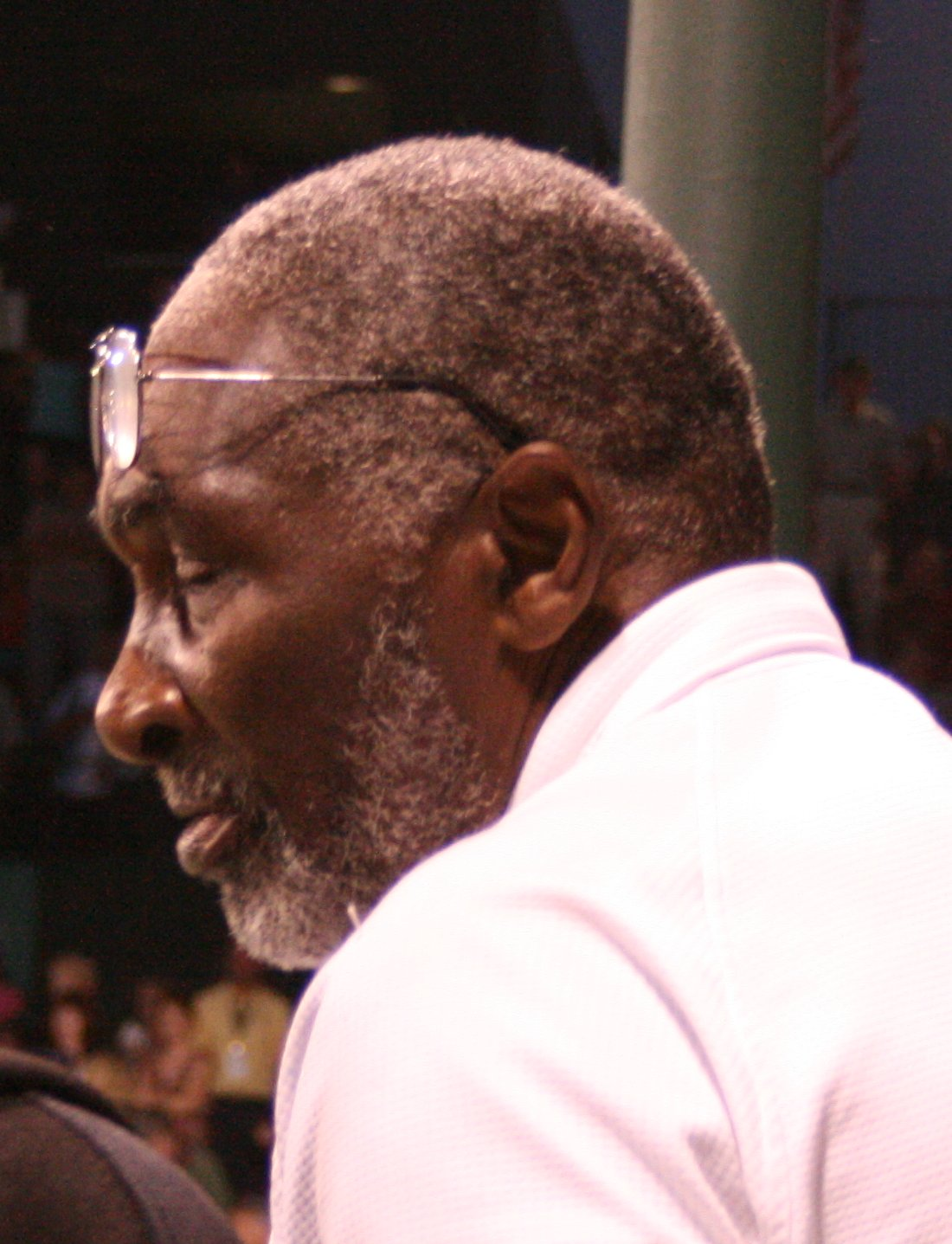
- Williams at the 2007 Acura Classic
- Full name: Richard Dove Williams Jr.
- Born: February 14, 1942 (age 84) Shreveport, Louisiana, U.S.

Coaching career (1994–2016)
- Venus Williams, Serena Williams (known as the "Williams sisters")

Coaching achievements
- Coachee singles titles total: 49(V)-73(S) (122 titles)
- Coachee doubles titles total: 21(S-V)-2(V)-5(S) (28 titles)
- List of notable tournaments (with champion): Career Golden Slam – Singles (Serena); 7× Australian Open (Serena); 3× French Open (Serena); 12× Wimbledon (Williams sisters); 8× US Open (Williams sisters); 2× Olympic Gold Medal (Williams sisters); 6× WTA Tour Championships (Williams sisters); 28× WTA Tier I/Premier Mandatory/Premier 5 (Williams sisters); Career Golden Slam – Doubles (Williams sisters); 4× Australian Open (Williams sisters); 2× French Open (Williams sisters); 5x Wimbledon (Williams sisters); 2× US Open (Williams sisters); 3× Olympic Gold Medal; Fed Cup champions (Williams sisters); 2× Hopman Cup (Serena); List of titles

Coaching awards and records
- Records: Venus Williams § Records and achievements; Serena Williams § Other records and achievements

Richard Dove Williams Jr. (born February 14, 1942) is an American former tennis coach and the father of tennis players Venus and Serena Williams. He styled himself "King Richard", which later became the title of an Oscar-winning biopic about him.

== Early life ==
Williams is the eldest of five children and the only son of Julia Mae (née Metcalf) and Richard Dove Williams of Shreveport, Louisiana. His younger sisters are Pat, Barbara, Penny, and Faye. After graduating from high school, he moved to Saginaw, Michigan and then to California.

== Tennis coaching ==
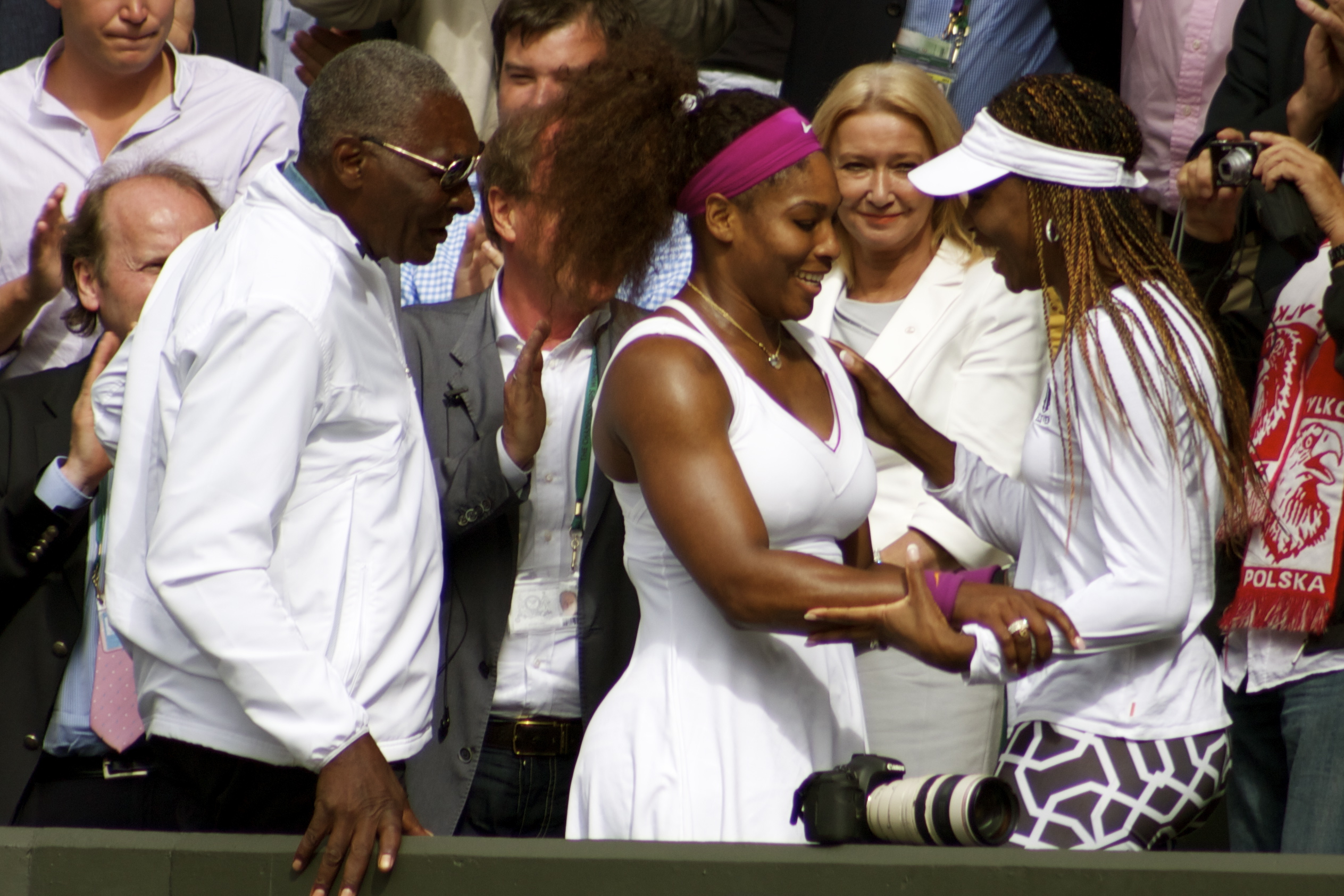
Williams with his daughters shortly after Serena Williams' victory in the 2012 Wimbledon Championships

Williams took tennis lessons from a man known as "Old Whiskey" and decided his future daughters would be tennis professionals after seeing Virginia Ruzici playing on television. Williams said that he wrote up an 85-page plan and started giving lessons to Venus and Serena when they were four and a half, taking them to practice on public tennis courts. Williams later added that he felt he took them too early and age six would have been more suitable. In 1995, Williams withdrew his daughters from a tennis academy and coached them himself. Around this time, he took to styling himself "King Richard", a name he said was given to him after gaining the respect of gangsters who called him "King Richard... Master and Lord of the ghettos in Compton, Ca."

Serena won the US Open in 1999 and Venus beat Lindsay Davenport to win the 2000 Wimbledon title. After that victory, Richard shouted "Straight Outta Compton!", in reference to a song by N.W.A based in Compton, the same area in Los Angeles where the family once resided. He jumped over the NBC broadcasting booth, catching Chris Evert by surprise and performing a triumphant dance. Evert said that the broadcasters "thought the roof was coming down".

== Personal life ==
Born in Shreveport, Louisiana, to a family of sharecroppers, Richard Williams had childhood experiences with racism. He has been open about his difficult childhood and experiences with racism and has credited his faith as a source of strength throughout each season of his life.

Williams has nine children, including Venus and Serena. He also had four stepdaughters from his first two marriages.

Prior to meeting his future wife Oracene Price in the 1970s, Williams moved to Saginaw, Michigan, then California, and met his first wife Betty Johnson. Johnson and Williams married in 1965 and had five children who were raised alongside Betty's other daughter. Williams and Johnson divorced in 1973.

In 1979, he met Oracene "Brandy" Price, who had three daughters from a previous relationship in California, and they married in 1980. They had two daughters, Venus (born June 17, 1980) and Serena (born September 26, 1981), both of whom would become tennis champions. The family resided in Compton, California. Williams and Oracene divorced in 2002; his eldest stepdaughter Yetunde was murdered the following year.

Williams then met ex-stripper Lakeisha Juanita Graham, and they married in 2010. They have a son. They separated in 2017, with divorce proceedings being terminated in 2024 after he failed to show up to court. Williams wants to end the marriage but has not been able to complete the legal procedures.

Williams also has a son from a relationship outside his marriages.

He authored two books: Black and White: The Way I See It, a memoir published in 2014, and Richard Williams: Tennis and Race in the United States, a study of race and tennis that was published in 2020. He has also been the subject of several documentaries and has been featured in various media outlets. However, in July 2016, Williams suffered a stroke. At the time his third wife, Lakeisha Williams, stated that his condition was stable. In 2022, Williams was reported to have had two strokes.

== In popular culture ==
A biographical film, King Richard, starring Will Smith as Richard Williams, was released on November 19, 2021, in theaters by Warner Bros. Pictures and streaming on HBO Max. The film was directed by Reinaldo Marcus Green and written by Zach Baylin. Venus and Serena served as executive producers. Smith received critical acclaim for his performance and won numerous awards, including the 2022 Academy Award for Best Actor in a Leading Role, Golden Globe Award for Best Actor in a Motion Picture Drama and the Screen Actor's Guild Award for Outstanding Performance by a Male Actor in a Leading Role in a Motion Picture.

A documentary film, On The Line: The Richard Williams Story, premiered at the 2022 Tribeca Film Festival and the 2023 Sheffield DocFest. Fremantle acquired the rights to the film, which will be released by Sky UK in the U.K. and Italy, Canal+ in France, M-Net in South Africa, and Network 10 in Australia. The film was directed and produced by Stuart McClave.

== Books ==
- With Bart Davis (2014). Black and White: The Way I See It. New York: Atria Books. ISBN 978-1476704203.
