= The People (song) =

Single by Common

from the album Finding Forever and the mixtape Can't Tell Me Nothing
- B-side: "The Game"
- Released: May 22, 2007
- Genre: Hip-hop
- Length: 3:31
- Label: GOOD; Geffen
- Songwriters: Lonnie Lynn; Kanye West; Gil Scott-Heron
- Producer: Kanye West

Common singles chronology
"A Dream" (2006)	"The People" (2007)	"The Game" (2007)

"The People" is a song by American hip-hop recording artist Common, released as the second single from his seventh studio album Finding Forever. The song made its first appearance on fellow American rapper Kanye West's Can't Tell Me Nothing mixtape. The song features production by West and contains background vocals provided by soul singer Dwele. The original version of the song had Common singing the hook by himself, but this was later replaced with Dwele singing the hook. It contains samples of "We Almost Lost Detroit" by Gil Scott-Heron as well as vocal samples of "Long Red" by Mountain (the latter of which was sampled on "Wouldn't Get Far" also produced by West). This action was part of West's intention to pay tribute to J Dilla through the production style expressed within the album.

Though it performed moderately on the charts, "The People" became one of the most critically acclaimed songs of the year. The song was listed at number twenty-nine on Rolling Stone's the 100 Best Songs of 2007. It also received a nomination for Best Rap Solo Performance at the 50th Grammy Awards.

== Music video ==
The music video for "The People" was directed by NEON and filmed in Brooklyn, NY with footage from Chicago, IL. The video premiered on June 22 on Y! Music and features stills of Common rapping in the middle of a field on the outskirts of the city, interspersed with scenes of various locations throughout the metropolis.

== Track listing ==
=== 12" single ===
==== A-side ====
1. "The People (Radio Edit) – 3:32
2. "The People (LP Version) – 3:32
3. "The People (Instrumental) – 3:22

==== B-side ====
1. "The Game" (Radio Edit) – 3:37
2. "The Game" (LP Version) – 3:35
3. "The Game" (Instrumental) – 3:35

=== CD single ===
1. "The People" (Radio Edit) – 3:33
2. "The People" (LP Version) – 3:33
3. "The People" (Instrumental) – 3:23

== Personnel ==
Information taken from Finding Forever liner notes.

- Produced by Kanye West
- Recorded by Andrew Dawson at Sony Studios, Record Plant and Sing Sing Recording Studios, Melbourne
- Mixed by Mike Dean at Encore Studios, Burbank, CA
- Callowhill electric bass by Derrick Hodge
- Keyboards by Omar Edwards
- Background vocals by Dwele

== Chart positions ==
Chart (2007)	Peak position
U.S. Billboard Bubbling Under Hot 100 Singles	11
U.S. Billboard Hot R&B/Hip-Hop Songs	55
