= I Want You (Common song) =

Single by Common

from the album Finding Forever
- Released: October 9, 2007
- Recorded: 2006
- Genre: Hip-hop
- Length: 4:30
- Label: GOOD; Geffen
- Songwriters: Lonnie Lynn; William Adams
- Producer: will.i.am

Common singles chronology
"Drivin' Me Wild" (2007)	"I Want You" (2007)	"Universal Mind Control" (2008)

will.i.am singles chronology
"Be OK" (2007)	"I Want You" (2007)	"The Girl Is Mine 2008" (2008)

Alternative covers
- U.S. vinyl cover

"I Want You" is a song by American rapper Common, released by GOOD Music and Geffen Records on October 9, 2007 as the fourth single from his album Finding Forever (2007). It is contains production and a guest appearance from fellow rapper will.i.am, who performs the song's hook. "I Want You" samples Minnie Riperton's song "Baby, This Love I Have", and Bob James' version of "Feel Like Makin' Love", which was written by Eugene McDaniels.

"I Want You" peaked at 12 on the US Bubbling Under Hot 100 chart.

== Track listing ==
UK CD:

1. "I Want You"
2. "Drivin' Me Wild" (featuring Lily Allen) (live)
3. "I Used to Love H.E.R." (live)
4. "Break My Heart" (live)
- Live tracks courtesy of Nissan Live sets on Yahoo Music, 2007.

== Music video ==
The video was directed by Sanji and actress Kerry Washington, who also co-starred in the video. It features Kanye West (who was the executive producer of the album), Derek Luke, Serena Williams and Alicia Keys.

The music video premiered on the YouTube on October 23, 2007.

== Personnel ==
- Produced by will.i.am
- Recorded by will.i.am and Padriac Kerin at Record Plant
- Mixed by Dylan Dresdow at Chalice Studio in Los Angeles
- Chorus vocals by will.i.am
- Background vocals by Rhea Williams
- Keys and synth by Omar Edwards

== Notes ==
- Common and Alicia Keys also appear in the 2006 movie Smokin' Aces together, in which their characters eventually become attracted to one another.
- Common and Alicia Keys also play lovers in her video for "Like You'll Never See Me Again," which appears on her 2007 album As I Am.
- Common makes a lyrical reference to Pete Rock & C.L. Smooth's hit single "They Reminisce Over You (T.R.O.Y.)".

== Chart positions ==
Chart (2008)	Peak position
U.S. Billboard Bubbling Under Hot 100 Singles	12
U.S. Billboard Hot R&B/Hip-Hop Songs	32
U.S. Billboard Hot Rap Tracks	21
