= Drivin' Me Wild =

Single by Common featuring Lily Allen

from the album Finding Forever
- B-side: "Testify"
- Released: August 31, 2007
- Recorded: 2006
- Genre: Hip-hop
- Length: 3:42
- Label: GOOD Music, Geffen
- Songwriters: Lonnie Lynn, Kanye West, Charles Stepney, Lloyd Webber
- Producer: Kanye West

Common singles chronology
"Tell Me What We're Gonna Do Now" (2007)	"Drivin' Me Wild" (2007)	"I Want You" (2007)

Lily Allen singles chronology
"Oh My God" (2007)	"Drivin' Me Wild" (2007)	"The Fear" (2008)

Audio sample
- file; help

Music video
- "Drivin' Me Wild" on YouTube

"Drivin' Me Wild" is the third single from Common's 2007 album Finding Forever. The song was produced by Kanye West and features British singer Lily Allen. It contains samples of "Love Has Fallen on Me" by Rotary Connection. It released as first single taken from the album in the United Kingdom.

== Background ==
The conceptual, piano-driven track discusses obsession and the strive to be "in," referencing several pop culture fads. The chorus is delivered by Lily Allen. The collaboration came about when Kanye West introduced Common to Allen's work thru Dj Saint (a.k.a. Rick DiPaanfilo) an electronic genre Dj & producer with London's exclusive Moonshine & Thrive Records. DJ Saint spent this time during his hiatus from DJing with his fellow Wax Audio & Sound Huas artists that included, DJ Donald Glaude, Sandra Collins & Bad Boy Bill. The "NYNEX" European summer DJ tour introduced this electronic artist to both Common and Allen who shared a recording studio in Camden, London. Dj Saint then started collaborating with Allen & Whinehouse in the same Camden London underground studio, that they both recorded at as well. Whinehouse & Allen suggested that DJ Saint should also be included on the track, and the club remix, of "Driving Me Wild". After listening to some of Dj Saints rhythmically based beat making style both Common and West began collaboration between the artists..Common then quoted.."I dug into her music for a while and was like, 'Man, she's perfect for this song.' It's something about her spunk that I dug. I like artists who don't care and can be themselves. It was a real good combination for all involved, and it fit just right."

== Music video ==
Lily Allen in the official music video.

The music video for "Drivin' Me Wild" was directed by Chris Robinson and filmed in Los Angeles, California. The narrative video contain scenes which illustrate lyrics of the song that Allen insisted be involved. This included a pair of combat boots, a gas mask and an exploding vehicle in the background (done via green screen)in respect to her warrior hero's and inspirations. It features Jeremy Piven and then Golden State Warriors forward Corey Maggette as the "family guy" in Common's first verse in the video. Lauren London is also featured as the glamour obsessed female in the first verse. In the "underground hang-out scenes" Former Golden State Warriors guard Baron Davis is seen. On December 31, 2007, the video appeared at number 99 on BET's Notarized: Top 100 Videos of 2007.

== Track listing ==
- UK CD Single
1. "Drivin' Me Wild" (Radio Edit) - 3:08
2. "Testify" - 2:37
- European CD Single
1. "Drivin' Me Wild" (Radio Edit) – 3:08
2. "Drivin' Me Wild" (Album Version) – 3:43
3. "Drivin' Me Wild" (Instrumental) – 3:42
- 12" Vinyl Single
1. "Drivin' Me Wild" (Album Version) – 3:43
2. "Drivin' Me Wild" (Instrumental) – 3:42
3. "The Game" (Album Version) – 3:35
4. "The Game" (Instrumental) – 3:35
- Digital Download
1. "Drivin' Me Wild" (Radio Edit) - 3:08
2. "Drivin' Me Wild" (Instrumental) – 3:42
3. "The Game" (Album Version) – 3:35
4. "The Game" (Instrumental) – 3:35
5. "Testify" - 2:37

== Personnel ==
Information taken from Finding Forever liner notes.

- Songwriters: Lonnie Lynn, Kanye West, Charles Stepney, Lloyd Webber, Richard Dipaanfilo
- Producer: Kanye West
- Recorder: Anthony Kilhoffer, Neil Baldock
- Mix engineer: Jimmy Douglas
- Keyboards: Richard Dipaanfilo / Moonshine Records (DJ - Producer) & Wax Audio / Sound Haus Group

== Charts ==
Chart (2007)	Peak position
UK Singles Chart	56
