= Finding Forever =

Studio album by Common
- Released: July 31, 2007
- Recorded: 2006–2007
- Genres: Hip-hop, neo soul
- Length: 49:53
- Labels: GOOD; Geffen
- Producers: Kanye West; will.i.am; J Dilla; Devo Springsteen; Karriem Riggins; Derrick Hodge

Common chronology
Be (2005)	Finding Forever (2007)	Universal Mind Control (2008)

Singles from Finding Forever
- 1. "The Game" Released: May 22, 2007; 2. "The People" Released: May 22, 2007; 3. "Drivin' Me Wild" Released: August 31, 2007; 4. "I Want You" Released: October 9, 2007

Finding Forever is the seventh studio album by Common, released on July 31, 2007, on GOOD Music and Geffen Records. Like Common's previous album, Be (2005), Finding Forever was largely produced by GOOD Music label boss and fellow Chicagoan Kanye West. The album debuted atop the Billboard 200 — selling 155,000 units in the first week — and became Common's only project to do so. Finding Forever also received gold certification by the Recording Industry Association of America (RIAA), and was nominated for Best Rap Album at the 50th Grammy Awards, but lost to West's album Graduation.

== Conception ==
=== Background ===
Common explains that "Finding Forever really means to find a place in music where you can exist forever. Music can be forever if you make it from the heart, if you make it from the soul and it’s good. And I look at music like Bob Marley's or Marvin Gaye's or Stevie Wonder's or A Tribe Called Quest's, that's forever music. And I’m continuing on the quest to make forever music."

Common also says: "And now with the death of J Dilla and other things, you start thinking about forever lasting for real through music [...] Jay Dee will last forever through his music and hopefully generations down the line will know about Common through his music. And it's also saying: I been doing this for a nice period of time, so I'm trying to find the place where I can keep existing in the game and make music I love."

=== Recording ===
Common began working on the album in early 2006, recording it throughout the United States, New Zealand, Australia, Hawaii, and Spain with Kanye West. Most of the album was recorded while he was filming his roles in American Gangster and Smokin' Aces. Common explained that "if you working on a movie or something ... [there is] less weight on writing the songs... At a certain point, as an artist, you go through things like, 'Man, I gotta make something better than what I did before.' [But] I didn't feel like that this time, like I got to make this better than Be. I wanted to make a better album... I definitely felt freer." Kanye West described the recording sessions as "a real easy environment".

== Music ==
=== Production ===
Common said that on some tracks, Kanye tried to chop the samples in a similar way to Dilla as a way of honoring him. It has also been said that Kanye West attempted to bring back a really soulful feel to the album. "It's gonna be like College Dropout and Be and Illmatic all combined together".

=== Rapping ===
"Sometimes you forget to just rap," Common explained when going back over a few of his past missteps. "I've been doing albums so long, so I look for new challenges. I spit so much on the first albums – and not to say I was the ultimate spitter, but I did it so much that I was looking for new things to do as a writer. I think that's where that stems from, me not really going hard on the rhymes. 'Cause I wanted to take on new subject matters and different things so I could grow and keep it interesting for me. But then you do get to the essence of what you are here for. And I love to rhyme. It does come out[...]"

=== Singles ===
Common and Kanye West debuted "Southside Super Bowl" on VH1's Super Bowl Pre Bash. The track is remade for Finding Forever under the alias "Southside".

Released on May 22, 2007, "The People" featuring a chorus by Dwele is the first single on Finding Forever, and produced by Kanye West. On the track, Common name-checks J Dilla and DJ Premier, rapping, "My daughter found Nemo/ I found the new Primo." He added that "The People" "is really a declaration of who I am right now."

The first video shot for the album, as well the second single for this album is "The Game." It contains free associative lyrics and a 1990s style boom bap beat. The duo brought in DJ Premier to scratch a chorus out of lines from "Half Good, Half Sinner" by O.C.

The third single is "Drivin' Me Wild", which features Lily Allen. Its video premiered on YouTube on September 1, 2007.

The fourth single was "I Want You", mixed by Dylan "3-D" Dresdow and produced by will.i.am of the Black Eyed Peas. The music video was co-directed by Kerry Washington.

== Reception ==
Professional ratings
Aggregate scores
Source	Rating
Metacritic	73/100
Review scores
Source	Rating
AllMusic	3.5/5 stars
The A.V. Club	B+
Entertainment Weekly	B+
The Irish Times	4/5 stars
Los Angeles Times	3/4 stars
MSN Music (Consumer Guide)	A−
NME	7/10
Pitchfork	5.6/10
Rolling Stone	3.5/5 stars
Spin	4.5/5 stars

Finding Forever received mainly positive reviews from music critics. On Metacritic, it was given a score of 73 out of 100 based on "generally favorable reviews". Pitchfork criticized it for being "tired". Rolling Stone similarly criticized it for being boring at times (though they gave a generally positive review). Vibe gave it a score of four out of five stars and said it "captures Common maturing gracefully into his--and hip hop's--middle age at a time when many peers are either talking retirement or being forced into it." The Village Voice gave it a favorable review and said, "Common delivers the expected--political, lover-man, and battle rhymes told with wit and complexity over street-commercial beats--in spades." XXL gave it a score of XL (four out of five) and said, "Once again, Common makes timeless hip-hop seem easy." About.com also gave it four stars out of five and called it "a must have" and "a taut, concise composition. There is no need to stop, pause or fast-forward over anything. Listen to it many times to catch the clever lyrics and absorb the multi-layered sound. J Dilla would be proud."

NME gave it a score of 7 out of 10 and said that the rest of the album "is soulful and intelligent where 'intelligent' is not exclusive to 'good beats and rhymes.' Which is what it's all about." The A.V. Club gave it a B+ and said, "It's tight, cohesive, devoid of filler, refreshingly brisk (at 50 minutes long), and sonically and lyrically focused." Spin gave it a score of 9 out of 10 and called it "livelier, grittier and better." The Observer gave it four out of five and said it was Kanye West's skill "in embellishing a sample and his unerring eye for a soulful hook that is consistently bringing the best out of his mentor-turned-protege." Canadian magazine Now gave it three out of five and said, "If you can stomach the contrived slow jams and the sensitive soul-baring, there are a couple of decent joints produced by West."

Despite some minor criticisms, Finding Forever was well-received, yet did not reach the same respect as his previous album Be. The album has since been certified gold by the RIAA as of October 25, 2007. This album was No. 15 on Rolling Stone's list of the Top 50 Albums of 2007.

=== Grammy Nominations ===
Finding Forever was nominated for three 2008 Grammy Awards:

- Best Rap Album, for Finding Forever
- Best Rap Performance by a Duo or Group, for "Southside" (featuring Kanye West) (from Finding Forever) WON
- Best Rap Solo Performance, for "The People" (featuring Dwele) (from Finding Forever)

== Track listing ==
Information is based on the album's liner notes.

Finding Forever track listing
No.	Title	Writer(s)	Producer(s)	Length
1.	"Intro"	Derrick Hodge	Derrick Hodge	1:17
2.	"Start the Show" (featuring Kanye West)	Lonnie R. Lynn; Kanye West; Alan Bergman; Marilyn Bergman; Michel Legrand	Kanye West	3:14
3.	"The People" (featuring Dwele)	Lynn; West; Gil Scott-Heron	Kanye West	3:24
4.	"Drivin' Me Wild" (featuring Lily Allen)	Lynn; West; Charles Stepney; Lloyd Webber	Kanye West	3:42
5.	"I Want You" (featuring will.i.am)	Lynn; Will Adams; Gene McDaniels	will.i.am	4:30
6.	"Southside" (featuring Kanye West)	Lynn; West; Don Covay	Kanye West	4:44
7.	"The Game" (featuring DJ Premier)	Lynn; West; Soul Ekos	Kanye West	3:32
8.	"U, Black Maybe" (featuring Bilal)	Lynn; West; Stevie Wonder	Kanye West	5:02
9.	"So Far to Go" (J Dilla featuring Common & D'Angelo)	Lynn; James Yancey; Michael Archer; Ernie Isley; Marvin Isley; O'Kelly Isley Jr.; Ronald Isley; Rudolph Isley; Chris Jasper	J Dilla	4:27
10.	"Break My Heart"	Lynn; West; George Duke	Kanye West	3:39
11.	"Misunderstood"	Lynn; Devon Harris; Bennie Benjamin; Gloria Caldwell; Sol Marcus	Devo Springsteen	4:46
12.	"Forever Begins"	Lynn; West; Paul Simon	Kanye West	7:36
Total length:				49:53

iTunes and United Kingdom Bonus Track
No.	Title	Writer(s)	Producer(s)	Length
13.	"Play Your Cards Right" (featuring Bilal)	Lynn; Karriem Riggins; Godoy Colbert; Henry Graham; Jimmy Conwell; Len Jewell	Karriem Riggins	3:07
Total length:				53:00

Sample credits

- "Start the Show" contains a sample from "The Windmills of Your Mind", as performed by Dorothy Ashby, written by Alan Bergman, Marilyn Bergman, and Michel Legrand.
- "The People" contains elements of "Long Red" by Mountain and samples from "We Almost Lost Detroit", written and performed by Gil Scott-Heron.
- "Drivin' Me Wild" contains samples from "Love Has Fallen on Me", as performed by The New Rotary Connection, written by Charles Stepney and Lloyd Webber.
- "I Want You" contains samples from "Feel Like Makin' Love, as performed by Bob James, written by Gene McDaniels.
- "Southside" contains excerpts from "If There's a Will There's a Way", written by Don Covay.
- "The Game" contains samples of "Tezeta", as performed by Seyfu Yohannes, written by Soul Ekos.
- "U, Black Maybe" contains samples from "Black Maybe", as performed by Syreeta, written by Stevie Wonder.
- "So Far to Go" contains samples from "Don't Say Goodnight (It's Time for Love)", as performed by The Isley Brothers, written by Ernie Isley, Marvin Isley, O'Kelly Isley Jr., Ronald Isley, Rudolph Isley, and Chris Jasper.
- "Break My Heart" contains samples from "Someday", written and performed by George Duke.
- "Misunderstood" contains samples from "Don't Let Me Be Misunderstood", as performed by Nina Simone, written by Bennie Benjamin, Gloria Caldwell, and Sol Marcus.
- "Forever Begins" contains samples from "50 Ways to Leave Your Lover", written and performed by Paul Simon.

== Charts ==
=== Weekly charts ===
Chart (2007)	Peak position
Canadian Albums (Billboard)	10
Dutch Albums (Album Top 100)	58
French Albums (SNEP)	82
German Albums (Offizielle Top 100)	92
Irish Albums (IRMA)	57
Norwegian Albums (VG-lista)	27
Swiss Albums (Schweizer Hitparade)	23
UK Albums (Official Charts)	35
US Billboard 200	1
US Top R&B/Hip-Hop Albums (Billboard)	1
US Top Rap Albums (Billboard)	1

=== Year-end charts ===
Chart (2007)	Position
US Billboard 200	110
US Top R&B/Hip-Hop Albums (Billboard)	39
Chart (2008)	Position
US Top R&B/Hip-Hop Albums (Billboard)	98

== Certifications ==
Region	Certification	Certified units/sales
United States (RIAA)	Gold	500,000^{^}
^{^} Shipments figures based on certification alone.

== Personnel ==
Technical credits

- Engineers – Brian "B. Kyle" Atkins, Neil Baldock, Anthony Kilhoffer, Dylan Dresdow, Phil Strong
- Assistant – Dave Paul
- Mixing – Andrew Dawson, Mike Dean, Dylan Dresdow
- Illustrations – Nigel Evan Dennis
- A&R – Don-C
- Marketing – Tim Reid
- Photography – Nabil Elderkin
- Production Coordination – Cliff Feiman

== Release history ==
Country	Date
United States	July 31, 2007
United Kingdom	August 2, 2007
