= 1994 Bank of the West Classic – Singles =

Singles
- 1994 Bank of the West Classic

Final
- Champion: (Spain) Arantxa Sánchez Vicario
- Runner-up: (United States) Martina Navratilova
- Score: 1–6, 7–6^{(7–5)}, 7–6^{(7–3)}

Details
- Draw: 28 (2WC/1Alt)
- Seeds: 8

Events
Singles	Doubles
← 1993 ·	Silicon Valley Classic	· 1995 →

Martina Navratilova was the defending champion, but lost in the final to Arantxa Sánchez Vicario. The score was 1–6, 7–6^{(7–5)}, 7–6^{(7–3)}. It was the 20th title for Sánchez Vicario in her singles career and her 8th title in this season, after previously winning at Amelia Island, Barcelona, Hamburg, the French Open, Montréal, the US Open and Tokyo.

This was the first ever professional tournament for future 7-time major champion and world No. 1 Venus Williams, at the age of 14. She defeated Shaun Stafford in the first round and faced Sánchez Vicario (then World No. 2) at the second round. Williams won the first set and was leading 3–1 in the second set, but Sánchez Vicario won the next 11 games in a row and won the match 2–6, 6–3, 6–0.

The match was recreated in the film King Richard, released in 2021. Sánchez Vicario (played by Mexican tennis player Marcela Zacarías) showed her discomfort after being portrayed as the antagonist of the film, as she was accused of performing gamesmanship in order to defeat Williams.

== Seeds ==
The first four seeds received a bye to the second round.

1. (Spain) Arantxa Sánchez Vicario (champion)
2. (United States) Martina Navratilova (final)
3. (United States) Lindsay Davenport (semifinals)
4. (Bulgaria) ~~Magdalena Maleeva~~ (withdrew)
5. (Germany) Anke Huber (quarterfinals)
6. (United States) Amy Frazier (quarterfinals)
7. (United States) Lori McNeil (first round)
8. (United States) Zina Garrison-Jackson (quarterfinals)

== Draw ==
=== Key ===
- Q = Qualifier
- WC = Wild card
- LL = Lucky loser
- Alt = Alternate
- SE = Special exempt
- PR = Protected ranking
- ITF = ITF entry
- JE = Junior exempt
- w/o = Walkover
- r = Retired
- d = Defaulted
- SR = Special ranking

=== Finals ===
Semifinals
1	(Spain) Arantxa Sánchez Vicario	6	4	6
3	(United States) Lindsay Davenport	2	6	3
(United States) Debbie Graham	6	2	5
2	(United States) Martina Navratilova	3	6	7

Final
1	(Spain) Arantxa Sánchez Vicario	1	7^{7}	7^{7}
2	(United States) Martina Navratilova	6	6^{5}	6^{3}

=== Top half ===
First round
WC	(United States) V Williams	6	6
(United States) S Stafford	3	4
(United States) M Werdel	6	4	6
(South Africa) J Kruger	4	6	3
(France) A Dechaume-Balleret	0	1
8	(United States) Z Garrison-Jackson	6	6
(United States) C Kuhlman	6	4	2
(United States) K Po	4	6	6
(United States) M McGrath	6	6
WC	(United States) M Tu	3	4
(United States) A Mall	2	6	2
5	(Germany) A Huber	6	4	6

Second round
1	(Spain) A Sánchez Vicario	2	6	6
WC	(United States) V Williams	6	3	0
(United States) M Werdel	3	3
8	(United States) Z Garrison-Jackson	6	6
3	(United States) L Davenport	5	6	7^{7}
(United States) K Po	7	3	6^{3}
(United States) M McGrath	0	4
5	(Germany) A Huber	6	6

Quarterfinals
1	(Spain) A Sánchez Vicario	6	6
8	(United States) Z Garrison-Jackson	3	3
3	(United States) L Davenport	6	6
5	(Germany) A Huber	2	2

Semifinals
1	(Spain) A Sánchez Vicario	6	4	6
3	(United States) L Davenport	2	6	3

=== Bottom half ===
First round
7	(United States) L McNeil	5	2
(United States) D Graham	7	6
(Belarus) T Ignatieva	4	2
(United States) P Fendick	6	6
(Czech Republic) P Langrová	2	1
(United States) J Watanabe	6	6
6	(United States) A Frazier	6	6
(South Africa) R Nideffer	0	0
(United States) P Shriver	4	7^{9}	2
(United States) T Whitlinger-Jones	6	6^{7}	6
(Germany) M Kochta	6	7
(United States) S Cacic	3	5

Second round
(United States) D Graham	5	6	6
(United States) P Fendick	7	2	2
(United States) J Watanabe	6	6
Alt	(Australia) E Smylie	0	2
6	(United States) A Frazier	6	6
(United States) T Whitlinger-Jones	4	2
(Germany) M Kochta	6	2	3
2	(United States) M Navratilova	4	6	6

Quarterfinals
(United States) D Graham	6	6
(United States) J Watanabe	0	2
6	(United States) A Frazier	6	4	1
2	(United States) M Navratilova	2	6	6

Semifinals
(United States) D Graham	6	2	5
2	(United States) M Navratilova	3	6	7
