= 1994 Bank of the West Classic =

- Date: October 31 – November 6
- Edition: 23rd
- Category: Tier II
- Draw: 28S / 16D
- Prize money: $400,000
- Surface: Carpet / indoor
- Location: Oakland, California, U.S.
- Venue: Oakland Alameda Coliseum

Champions

Singles
- (Spain) Arantxa Sánchez Vicario

Doubles
- (United States) Lindsay Davenport (Spain) Arantxa Sánchez Vicario
- Stanford Classic

The 1994 Bank of the West Classic was a women's tennis tournament played on indoor carpet courts at the Oakland-Alameda County Coliseum Arena in Oakland, California in the United States and was part of the Tier II category of the 1994 WTA Tour. It was the 23rd edition of the tournament ran from October 31 through November 6, 1994. First-seeded Arantxa Sánchez Vicario won the singles title and earned $80,000 first-prize money as well as 300 ranking points.

== Finals ==
=== Singles ===
(Spain) Arantxa Sánchez Vicario defeated (United States) Martina Navratilova 1–6, 7–6^{(7–5)}, 7–6^{(7–3)}

- It was Sánchez Vicario's 8th singles title of the year and the 20th of her career.

=== Doubles ===
(United States) Lindsay Davenport / (Spain) Arantxa Sánchez Vicario defeated (United States) Gigi Fernández / (United States) Martina Navratilova 7–5, 6–4
