= Venus Williams =

American tennis player (born 1980)

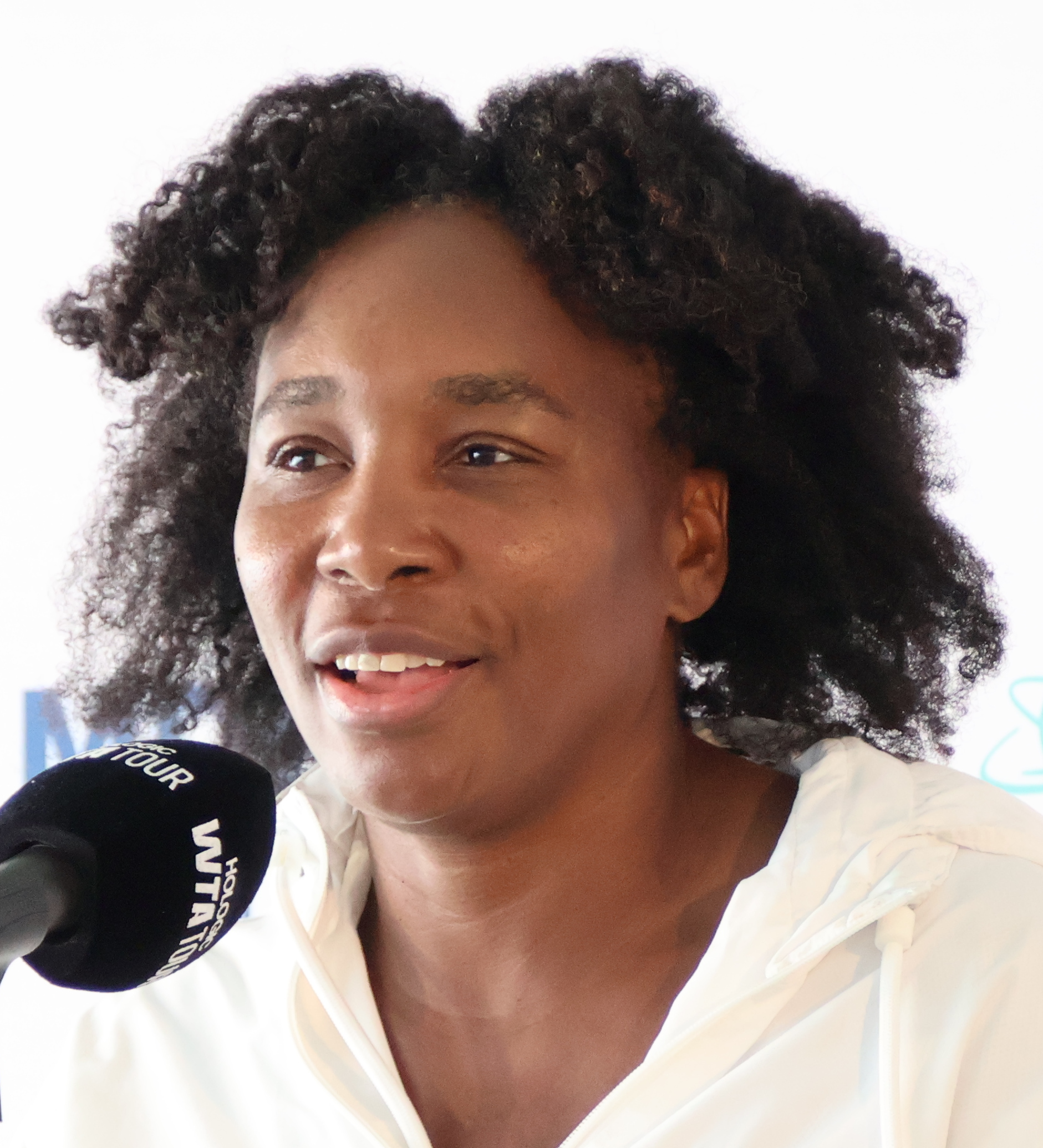
- Williams in 2025
- Full name: Venus Ebony Star Williams
- Country (sports): United States
- Residence: Palm Beach Gardens, Florida, US
- Born: June 17, 1980 (age 46) Lynwood, California, US
- Height: 6 ft 1 in (185 cm)
- Turned pro: October 1994
- Plays: Right-handed (two-handed backhand)
- College: Indiana University East (BSBA)
- Coach: Diego Ayala (2025–present)
- Prize money: US$42,874,504; 4th all-time in earnings

Singles
- Career record: 819–281 (74.5%)
- Career titles: 49
- Highest ranking: No. 1 (February 25, 2002)
- Current ranking: No. 479 (April 20, 2026)

Grand Slam singles results
- Australian Open: F (2003, 2017)
- French Open: F (2002)
- Wimbledon: W (2000, 2001, 2005, 2007, 2008)
- US Open: W (2000, 2001)

Other tournaments
- Grand Slam Cup: W (1998)
- Tour Finals: W (2008)
- Olympic Games: W (2000)

Doubles
- Career record: 186–39 (82.7%)
- Career titles: 22
- Highest ranking: No. 1 (June 7, 2010)
- Current ranking: No. 145 (November 24, 2025)

Grand Slam doubles results
- Australian Open: W (2001, 2003, 2009, 2010)
- French Open: W (1999, 2010)
- Wimbledon: W (2000, 2002, 2008, 2009, 2012, 2016)
- US Open: W (1999, 2009)

Other doubles tournaments
- Tour Finals: SF (2009)
- Olympic Games: W (2000, 2008, 2012)

Mixed doubles
- Career record: 31–11 (73.8%)
- Career titles: 2

Grand Slam mixed doubles results
- Australian Open: W (1998)
- French Open: W (1998)
- Wimbledon: F (2006)
- US Open: QF (1998)

Other mixed doubles tournaments
- Olympic Games: F (2016)

Team competitions
- Fed Cup: W (1999), record 21–4
- Hopman Cup: RR (2013)
- Spouse: Andrea Preti (m. 2025)

Medal record
Women's tennis
Representing United States
Olympic Games
Gold medal – first place	2000 Sydney	Singles
Gold medal – first place	2000 Sydney	Doubles
Gold medal – first place	2008 Beijing	Doubles
Gold medal – first place	2012 London	Doubles
Silver medal – second place	2016 Rio de Janeiro	Mixed doubles
- Last updated on: November 24, 2025.

Venus Ebony Star Williams (born June 17, 1980) is an American professional tennis player. She has been ranked as the world No. 1 in both women's singles and doubles by the Women's Tennis Association. Williams has won 49 WTA Tour-level singles titles, including seven majors (five at Wimbledon and two at the US Open), as well as a gold medal at the 2000 Sydney Olympics and the 2008 WTA Tour Championships. She has also won 22 doubles titles, including 14 majors and three Olympic gold medals.

Along with her younger sister, Serena, Venus Williams was coached by her parents Oracene Price and Richard Williams. Turning professional in 1994, she reached her first major final as a 17-year-old at the 1997 US Open. In both 2000 and 2001, Williams claimed the Wimbledon and US Open titles, as well as Olympic singles gold at the Sydney Olympics. She first reached the singles world No. 1 ranking on February 25, 2002, becoming the first African-American woman to do so in the Open era, and the second of all time after Althea Gibson. Williams reached four consecutive major finals between 2002 and 2003, but lost each time to Serena. She then suffered from injuries, winning just one major title between 2003 and 2006. Williams returned to form starting in 2007, when she won Wimbledon (a feat she repeated the following year). In 2010, she returned to the world No. 2 position in singles, but then suffered again from injuries. Starting in 2014, she gradually returned to form, culminating in two major final appearances in 2017 at the Australian Open and Wimbledon Championships.

Along with her seven singles major titles, Williams has won 14 women's doubles major titles, all partnering Serena; the pair are unbeaten in major doubles finals. She became the world No. 1 in doubles for the first time on June 7, 2010, alongside Serena, after the pair completed a non-calendar-year Grand Slam at the French Open. The pair also won three Olympic gold medals in women's doubles, in 2000, 2008, and 2012, adding to Venus's singles gold in 2000 and her mixed doubles silver in 2016. Williams has also won two mixed doubles major titles for a combined total of 23 major titles.

The Williams sisters are credited with ushering in a new era of power and athleticism on the women's professional tennis tour. Venus Williams was twice the season prize money leader (in 2001 and 2017), and ranks fourth in all-time career prize money winnings, having earned over US$42 million as of November 2025.

== Early life ==
Venus Ebony Star Williams was born on June 17, 1980, in Lynwood, California, to Richard Williams and Oracene Price. In addition to her full sister Serena, Venus has three maternal half-sisters—the late Yetunde, Lyndrea, and Isha Price—and at least seven paternal half-siblings. Venus and Serena were home-schooled by their father.

When Venus was three years old, Richard moved the family to Compton, over the objections of his wife. Richard had studied sports success stories, and believed that the rough environment of Compton would toughen up Venus and Serena in preparation for their tennis careers.

The family moved to West Palm Beach, Florida, when Venus was eleven, so that she and Serena could attend the tennis academy of Rick Macci, who took notice of the sisters and who would provide additional coaching. He did not always agree with Williams's father but respected that "he treated his daughters like kids, allowed them to be little girls". Richard stopped sending his daughters to national junior tennis tournaments when Williams was eleven, since he wanted them to take it slowly and focus on schoolwork. Another motivation was racial, as he had allegedly heard parents of other players disparage the Williams sisters during tournaments. At that time, Williams held a 63–0 record on the United States Tennis Association junior tour and was ranked No. 1 among the under-12 players in Southern California. In 1995, Richard pulled his daughters out of Macci's academy and took over all coaching.

== Career ==
=== 1994–96: Turned professional ===
Venus Williams turned professional on October 31, 1994, at the age of 14. In the first round of her first professional tournament, the Bank of the West Classic in Oakland, she defeated former NCAA singles champion Shaun Stafford. In the second round, Williams was up a set and a service break against world No. 2, Arantxa Sánchez Vicario, before losing the match. That was the only tournament Williams played in 1994.

In 1995, Williams played three more events as a wildcard. She lost in the first round of tournaments in Los Angeles and Toronto, but reached the quarterfinals in Oakland, defeating No. 18 Amy Frazier in the second round, before losing to Magdalena Maleeva. Williams played five events in 1996, losing in the first round four times but reaching the third round in Los Angeles, before losing to No. 1 Steffi Graf.

=== 1997: Major debut and first final ===
Williams played 15 tour events in 1997, including five Tier I tournaments. She reached the quarterfinals in three of the Tier I events—the State Farm Evert Cup in Compton, California, the European Indoor Championships in Zürich, and the Kremlin Cup in Moscow. At the State Farm Evert Cup in March, Williams defeated No. 9 Iva Majoli in the third round, marking her first win over a player ranked in the top 10. She then lost in the quarterfinals to No. 8 Lindsay Davenport. Williams's was first ranked in the top 100 on April 14, 1997. She made her debut in the main draw of a Grand Slam tournament at the French Open, reaching the second round before losing to Nathalie Tauziat. She then lost in the first round of Wimbledon to Magdalena Grzybowska.

During Williams's debut at the 1997 US Open, she collided with Irina Spîrlea in a semifinal match. Sports Illustrated claimed that Spîrlea intentionally "bumped" Williams. After Williams won the match, her father Richard accused Spîrlea of racism. Williams lost to Martina Hingis in the final.

=== 1998: First WTA Tour singles title and top 5, first major doubles titles ===
In her debut at the Australian Open, Williams defeated her younger sister Serena in the second round, which was the sisters' first professional meeting. Williams eventually lost in the quarterfinals to No. 3 Davenport.

Three weeks later, Williams defeated Davenport, now No. 2, in the semifinals of the Cellular South Cup in Oklahoma City. Williams then won against Joannette Kruger in the final, earning the first singles title of her career. In her first Tier I event of the year, Williams lost in the semifinals of the State Farm Evert Cup to No. 1 Hingis. The following week, Williams won the Tier I Lipton International Players Championships in Key Biscayne, Florida. On March 30, 1998, she achieved her highest world ranking yet, at No. 10.

Williams played only one tournament on clay before the 1998 French Open. At the Italian Open in Rome, she defeated her sister in the quarterfinals and Sánchez Vicario in the semifinals, before losing to No. 1 Hingis in the final. Williams lost again to Hingis in the quarterfinals of the French Open, and was defeated by No. 3 Jana Novotná in the quarterfinals of Wimbledon. On July 27, 1998, Williams's ranking rose to world No. 5.

Williams played three tournaments during the North American 1998 summer hardcourt season. She reached her fifth final of the year at the Stanford Classic in California, defeating No. 6 Monica Seles in the semifinals before losing to No. 1 Davenport. Patellar tendonitis in her left knee caused her to retire from her quarterfinal match in San Diego while trailing Mary Pierce in the third set. At the US Open, Williams defeated fourth-seeded Sánchez Vicario in the quarterfinals before losing to second seeded and eventual champion Davenport in the semifinals. 1998 was the first year that Williams reached at least the quarterfinals of all majors.

Williams played four tournaments in the remainder of 1998. She won her third title of the year at the Grand Slam Cup in Munich in September, defeating No. 9 Patty Schnyder in the final. She lost in the second round of the Porsche Tennis Grand Prix in Filderstadt, before losing in the final of the Tier I Swisscom Challenge in Zürich to No. 1 Davenport and the semifinals of the Tier I Kremlin Cup in Moscow to Pierce. She had earned enough points during the year to participate in the year-ending WTA Tour Championships but withdrew from the tournament because of tendonitis in her knee. She finished the year ranked No. 5.

In 1998, Williams teamed with Justin Gimelstob to win the mixed doubles titles at the Australian Open and the French Open. Her sister Serena Williams won the other two Grand Slam mixed doubles titles that year, completing a "Williams Family Mixed Doubles Grand Slam". Williams won the first two women's doubles titles of her career, in Oklahoma City and Zürich. Both titles came with her sister, becoming only the third pair of sisters to win a WTA tour doubles title.

=== 1999: Three Tier I titles ===
Williams started the 1999 season in Australia, where she lost to No. 10 Steffi Graf in the quarterfinals of the Sydney International and to No. 1 Davenport in the quarterfinals of the Australian Open. However, she rebounded at the Faber Grand Prix in Hanover, defeating Graf for the first time in the semifinals before losing the final to No. 3 Novotná. Williams then successfully defended her titles in both Oklahoma City and Key Biscayne. The Key Biscayne tournament marked the first time a pair of sisters faced off in a final on the WTA Tour.

Williams lost her first match at the Amelia Island Championships in Florida. Three weeks later, however, she won her first title on clay at the WTA Hamburg, defeating Mary Pierce in the final. Williams then won the Tier I Italian Open in Rome, defeating No. 1 Hingis in the semifinals and No. 8 Pierce in the final. At the French Open, she extended her winning streak to 22 matches before losing in the fourth round to No. 125, Barbara Schwartz. Williams teamed with Serena Williams to win the women's doubles title at this event, the first Grand Slam title the pair won together.

At Wimbledon, Williams reached the quarterfinals for the second consecutive year, losing to eventual runner-up Graf.

Williams rebounded in the summer when she won two Fed Cup matches against Italy and lost in the final of the Stanford Classic to No. 1 Davenport. One week later, Williams defeated Davenport in the semifinals of the San Diego Classic, before losing to No. 2 Hingis in the final. In her last tournament before the US Open, Williams won the New Haven Open in Connecticut, defeating No. 5 Seles in the semifinals and Davenport in the final. On August 30, 1999, her world ranking reached third for the first time. Seeded third at the 1999 US Open, Williams lost in the semifinals to No. 1 Hingis in three sets. However, she teamed with singles champion Serena Williams at this event to win their second Grand Slam women's doubles title.

Williams contributed to the victory of the USA team over Russia in the Fed Cup final, winning one singles rubber before joining her sister to win the doubles rubber. At the Grand Slam Cup in Munich, Williams defeated Hingis in the semifinals before losing to her sister Serena for the first time in the final. Williams won her sixth title of the year at the Tier I event in Zurich, defeating No. 1 Hingis in the final. Four weeks later, she lost to Davenport in the semifinals of the tournament in Philadelphia. Making her debut at the year-ending WTA Championships, Williams lost to Hingis in the semifinals. She finished the year ranked No. 3.

=== 2000: Olympic gold medals, first major titles ===
In 2000, Williams missed the first five months of the year with tendinitis in both wrists. She returned to the tour during the European clay court season. She lost in the quarterfinals of the Betty Barclay Cup in Hamburg to Amanda Coetzer and in the third round of the Tier I Italian Open in Rome to Jelena Dokić. Although she had won only two of her four matches before the French Open, she was seeded fourth there. She won her first four matches in Paris without losing a set before losing in the quarterfinals to eighth-seeded and former champion Arantxa Sánchez, in three sets.

Williams then won 35 consecutive singles matches and six tournaments. She won her first major singles title at Wimbledon, defeating No. 1, Martina Hingis, in the quarterfinals, sister Serena in the semifinal and defending champion, Lindsay Davenport, in the final. She also teamed with her sister Serena to win the women's doubles title at this event.

She won three Tier II events during the North American summer hardcourt season, defeating Davenport in the final of the Silicon Valley Classic in Stanford and Monica Seles in the finals of both the San Diego Classic in and the Pilot Pen Tennis championships in New Haven.

At the 2000 US Open, Williams defeated No. 1 Hingis in the semifinals and No. 2 Davenport in the final. At the 2000 Summer Olympics in Sydney, she defeated Sánchez Vicario in the quarterfinals, Seles in the semifinals, and Elena Dementieva in the final to win the gold medal. She also won the gold medal in women's doubles with her younger sister Serena. Davenport eventually snapped her winning streak in October in the final of the Linz Open. Williams did not play a tournament the rest of the year because of anemia. She finished the year ranked world No. 3 and with six singles titles.

=== 2001: Third & fourth major titles ===
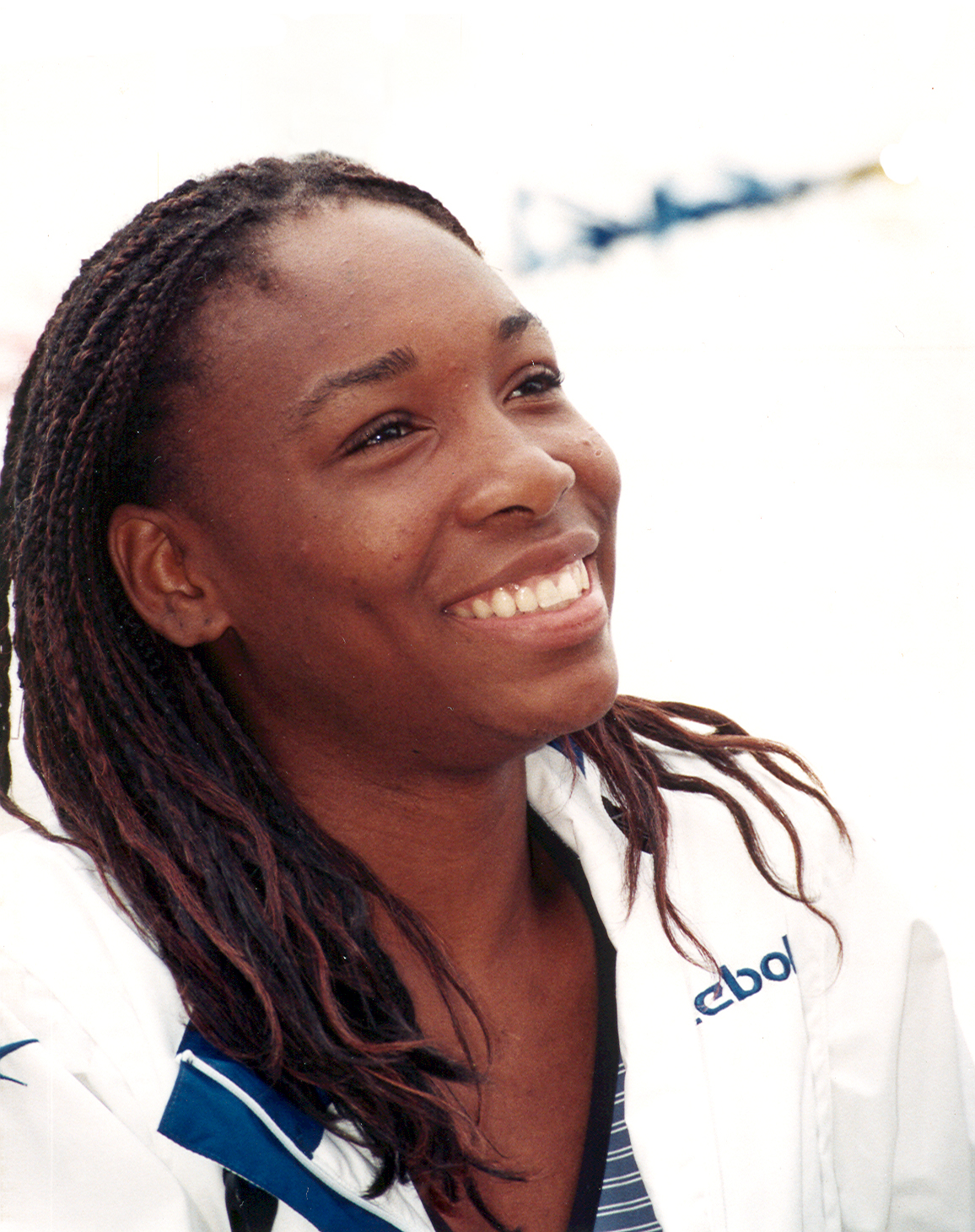
Williams in 2001

In 2001, Williams reached the semifinals of the Australian Open for the first time, where she lost to No. 1 Hingis. However, Williams teamed with her sister to win the doubles title at the event, completing a Career Golden Slam in women's doubles for the pair.

Williams also reached the semifinals of the Tier I Tennis Masters Series tournament in Indian Wells, where she controversially defaulted her match with her sister just before the match started. Williams had been suffering from knee tendinitis throughout the tournament and eventually this prevented her from playing. The following day, Williams and her father Richard were booed as they made their way to their seats to watch the final. Serena Williams was subsequently booed during the final with Kim Clijsters and during the trophy presentation. Due to this, neither Williams sister entered the tournament for 14 years, with her sister Serena entering in 2015 after appeals for forgiveness from the event and the WTA Tour. Williams rebounded from the Indian Wells 'boycott' controversy to win the next tournament on the tour calendar, the Tier I Key Biscayne Open. She defeated Hingis in the semifinals and No. 4 Jennifer Capriati in the final, after saving eight championship points. Because of this victory, her ranking rose to a career high of No. 2.

During the European clay-court season, Williams won the Tier II tournament in Hamburg but lost in the third round of the Tier I German Open to No. 18 Justine Henin and the first round of the French Open to Barbara Schett. This was only the second time that she had lost in the first round of a Grand Slam singles tournament. Williams then successfully defended her Wimbledon title, defeating third-seeded Davenport in the semifinals and eighth-seeded Henin in three sets in Henin's first Wimbledon final.

During the North American summer hardcourt season, Williams won for the second consecutive year the tournaments in San Diego, defeating Seles in the final, and in New Haven, defeating Davenport in the final. Williams also won the 2001 US Open singles title for the second consecutive year, without dropping a set. In the quarterfinals, she beat fifth-seeded Clijsters, followed by a semifinal victory over No. 2 Capriati. She played her sister Serena in the final, which was the first Grand Slam singles final contested by two sisters during the open era. Venus won the match and her fourth Grand Slam singles title. Williams also became only the sixth woman in history to win the singles titles at both Wimbledon and the US Open in consecutive years, the others being Martina Navratilova (twice), Steffi Graf (twice), Althea Gibson, Maureen Connolly Brinker, and Helen Wills Moody (twice).

=== 2002: World No. 1 ranking ===
Williams began 2002 by winning the Mondial Australian Women's Hardcourts in Gold Coast, defeating Henin in the final. However, she then lost for the first time in her career to Seles in the quarterfinals of the Australian Open. Williams then went on to win the Open Gaz de France in Paris when Jelena Dokić withdrew from the final, and the Proximus Diamond Games in Antwerp, defeating Henin in the final. As a result of her strong start to the season, Williams assumed the world No. 1 position for the first time on February 25, dislodging Capriati. Williams was the first African-American woman ever to hold the ranking. She held it for just three weeks before surrendering it back to Capriati.

Williams failed to defend her title in Miami, after losing in the semifinals to her sister Serena. However, she made a strong start to the clay-court season, winning the Amelia Island Championships, defeating Henin in the final. A week after winning that tournament, she once again replaced Capriati as the No. 1, before losing it again to Capriati after three weeks. During those three weeks, Williams had made the final in Hamburg, defeating Hingis in the semifinals, before losing to Clijsters in the final. Seeded second at the French Open, Williams defeated former champion Seles to reach the semifinals for the first time. There, she defeated Clarisa Fernández. In the final, Williams met her sister Serena for a second time in a Grand Slam final, with her sister winning. Williams once again replaced Capriati as the No. 1 as a result of reaching the final.

As the top seed at Wimbledon, Williams defeated Henin in the semifinals to make the final for the third consecutive year. However, there, she lost to her sister Serena. This result meant Serena Williams replaced Venus as the No. 1. The Williams sisters teamed up to win the women's doubles title at the event, their fifth major women's doubles title together.

Williams won the titles in San Diego and New Haven for the third consecutive year, defeating Davenport and Dokic to win the former and defeating Davenport in the final of the latter. At the 2002 US Open, Williams defeated Seles in the quarterfinals and Amélie Mauresmo in three sets to make the final. Playing her younger sister Serena for their third consecutive Grand Slam final, her sister won once again. After that, Williams played just four more matches during the season. She reached the semifinals at the year-ending Tour Championships after defeating Seles in the quarterfinals, but she then was forced to retire against Clijsters due to injury. Williams finished the year ranked No. 2 having won seven titles, her best showing in both respects of her career.

=== 2003: Australian Open & Wimbledon finals, injuries ===
Williams started 2003 by defeating fifth seed Justine Henin to make the final of the Australian Open for the first time. In the final, however, she lost to her sister Serena. This marked the first time in the open era that the same two players had met in four consecutive Grand Slam finals (matched by Rafael Nadal & Novak Djokovic who met in Wimbledon 2011 final through the French Open 2012 final). Venus and Serena Williams teamed to win the women's doubles title at the event, their sixth Grand Slam title in women's doubles.

In February, Williams won the Proximus Diamond Games in Antwerp for the second consecutive year, defeating Kim Clijsters in the final. However, shortly afterwards, she began to struggle with injury. She reached the final of the clay-court J&S Cup in Warsaw, before being forced to retire against Amélie Mauresmo. She then suffered her earliest exit at a Grand Slam tournament in two years when she lost in the fourth round of the French Open to Vera Zvonareva.

At Wimbledon, Williams was seeded fourth. Williams defeated former champion Lindsay Davenport in the quarterfinals and Kim Clijsters in the semifinals to advance to her fourth consecutive Wimbledon final, where she lost again to sister Serena.

Wimbledon was Williams's last event of the year as an abdominal injury that occurred during the Clijsters match prevented her from playing again. While she was recovering from the injury, her sister Yetunde Price was murdered. Williams finished the year ranked No. 11. It was the first time in nearly six years that she had dropped out of the top 10.

=== 2004: Tough losses and further injuries ===
In 2004, Williams came back to the tour suffering inconsistent results. As the third seed because of a protected ranking, she reached the third round of the Australian Open, where she lost to Lisa Raymond. She then lost in the quarterfinals of her next three tournaments.

Williams began to find her form at the beginning of the clay-court season. At the Tier I Family Circle Cup in Charleston, Williams defeated Conchita Martínez in the final to win her first title in over a year and the second Tier I title on clay of her career. She then won in Warsaw, defeating Svetlana Kuznetsova in the final, before reaching the final of the Tier I German Open in Berlin. She then withdrew from that match against Mauresmo due to injury. Going into the French Open, Williams had the best clay-court record among the women and was among the favorites to win the title; however, after making the quarterfinals to extend her winning streak on the surface to 19 matches, she lost to eventual champion Anastasia Myskina. Despite her defeat, she re-entered the top 10.

In Wimbledon, Williams lost a controversial second-round match to Croatian Karolina Šprem. The umpire of the match, Ted Watts, awarded Šprem an unearned point in the second-set tiebreak. Upon the conclusion of the match, he was relieved of his duties. This defeat marked the first time since 1997 that Williams had exited Wimbledon prior to the quarterfinals. After Wimbledon, she reached her fourth final of the year at the Stanford Classic in California, where she was beaten by Lindsay Davenport for the first time since 2000.

As the defending champion at the Athens Olympics, Williams lost in the third round to Mary Pierce. She then won three very close matches against Petra Mandula, Shikha Uberoi and Chanda Rubin to make the fourth round of the 2004 US Open where she lost to Davenport, the first time she had ever lost at the US Open prior to the semifinals. Williams completed the year by losing in the quarterfinals of three indoor tournaments in the fall, a period that included defeat in her first meeting with 17-year-old Wimbledon champion Maria Sharapova at the Zurich Open. Williams finished the year as No. 9 and did not qualify for the year-ending WTA Tour Championships.

=== 2005: Third Wimbledon title ===
In 2005, Williams started the year by losing in the fourth round of the Australian Open to Alicia Molik. She then reached the final in Antwerp, defeating Clijsters and Myskina en route. In the final, Williams was a set and a service break up against Mauresmo before eventually losing.

In March, at the Miami Open, she defeated sister Serena in the quarterfinals, the first time she had defeated her since 2001. Venus Williams went on to lose in the semifinals to No. 3 Sharapova. In May, she won her first title in over a year at the clay-courts at the İstanbul Cup, defeating Nicole Vaidišová in the final. However, at the French Open, she lost in the third round to 15-year-old Sesil Karatantcheva, who subsequently tested positive for steroids and was suspended.

Williams was seeded 14th for the Wimbledon Championships. In the quarterfinals of the tournament, she defeated French Open runner-up Pierce in a second-set tiebreak, winning it 12–10 to make the semifinals of a Grand Slam for the first time in two years. There, she defeated defending champion and second-seeded Sharapova to make the Wimbledon final for the fifth time in six years. Playing top-seeded Davenport in the final, Williams saved a match point with a backhand winner en route to winning. This was her third Wimbledon singles title, her fifth Grand Slam singles title overall and her first since 2001. It was the first time in 70 years that a player had won after being down match point during the women's final at Wimbledon.

Williams reached her fourth final of the year in Stanford, where she lost to Clijsters. At the 2005 US Open, Williams achieved her second consecutive win over sister Serena in the fourth round, but then lost in the quarterfinals to eventual champion Kim Clijsters. Williams did not qualify for the year-ending Tour Championships because of an injury sustained during the China Open. She finished the year ranked No. 10. It was the first year since 2001 that she had finished a year ranked higher than her sister Serena Williams.

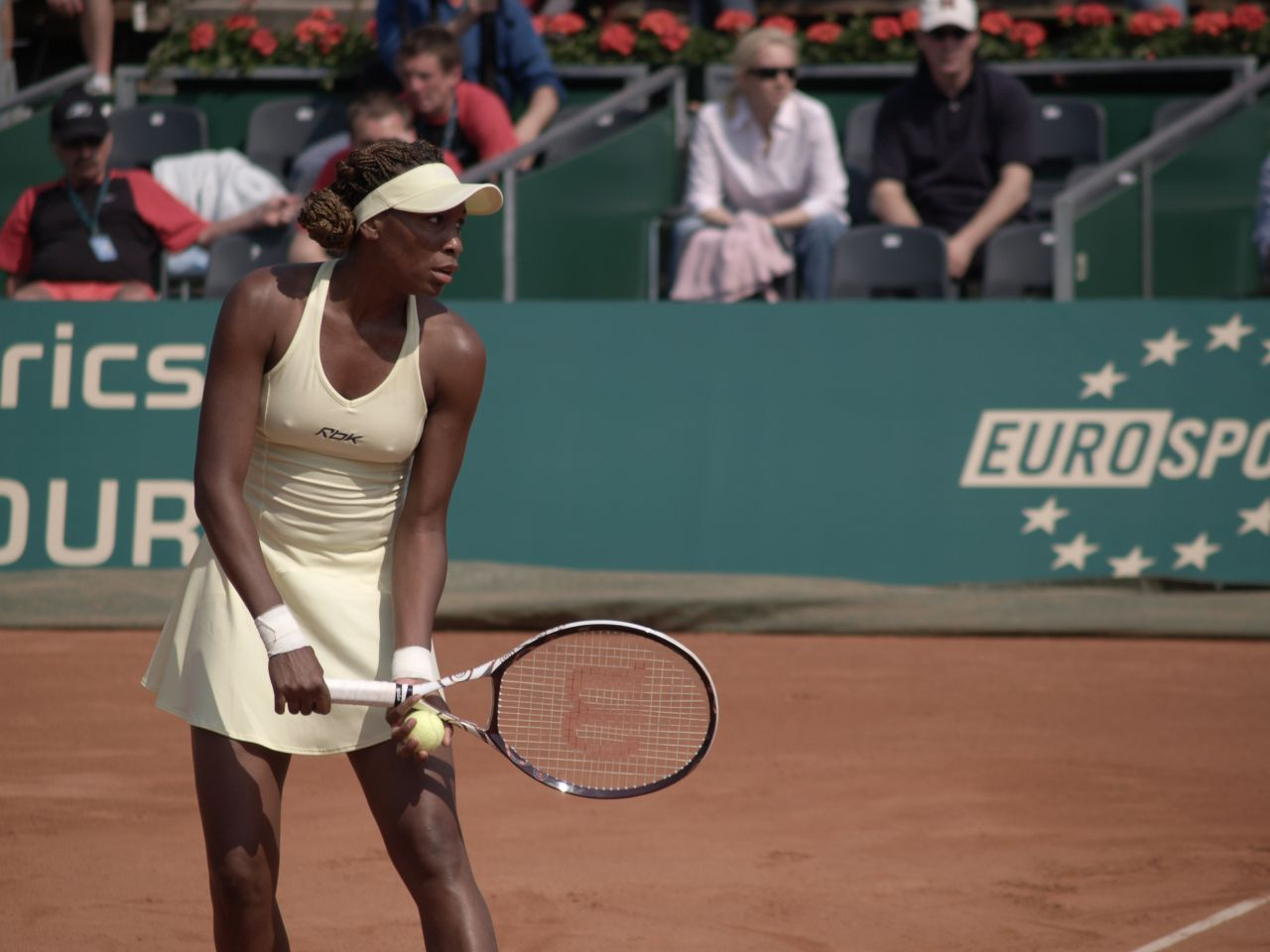
Williams prepares to serve during the 2006 J&S Cup in Warsaw

=== 2006: Wrist injury and drop in the rankings ===
In 2006, Williams was upset in the first round of the Australian Open by Tsvetana Pironkova, which was her earliest loss ever at that tournament. After that loss, she did not play again for three months due to a wrist injury. She returned in late April on clay in Warsaw, where she defeated former No. 1 Hingis in the second round, before losing to Svetlana Kuznetsova in the quarterfinals. Williams completed the clay-court season by reaching the quarterfinals of the French Open, where she lost to Nicole Vaidišová.

Williams was the defending champion and one of the favorites to win the singles title at Wimbledon. However, she lost in the third round to 26th-seeded Jelena Janković. After the loss, Williams said that she was having pain in her left wrist, although she admitted that the injury was not the cause of her loss. Williams did not play in the US Open Series or the US Open itself due to the wrist injury. In October, during her first tournament in almost three months, she reinjured her wrist at the Luxembourg Open and lost in the second round to qualifier Agnieszka Radwańska. Williams finished the season as No. 46, her lowest finish since she began to play on the WTA Tour full-time in 1997. It was the second consecutive year she finished higher than her sister Serena, who finished the year at No. 95.

=== 2007: Fourth Wimbledon title ===
Williams withdrew from the 2007 Australian Open, the second consecutive Grand Slam that she had missed due to her recurring wrist injury. She returned in February at the Cellular South Cup in Memphis, defeating top-seeded Shahar Pe'er in the final, her first singles title since her victory at Wimbledon in 2005.

At the beginning of the clay-court season, Williams reached the semifinals of the Tier I Charleston Open, where she lost to Janković on a third set tiebreak. She also lost to fourth seed Janković in the third round of the French Open, her third consecutive loss to Janković. During her second round win over Ashley Harkleroad, Williams hit a 206 km/h (128 mph) serve, which was the second fastest woman's serve ever recorded and the fastest ever recorded during a main draw match at the time.

Williams was ranked No. 31 going into Wimbledon and was seeded 23rd at the tournament due to her previous results at Wimbledon. Williams was a game away from defeat in her first round match against Alla Kudryavtseva and in her third round match against Akiko Morigami she was two points away from defeat, but she eventually won both 7–5 in the third set. She then advanced to reach her sixth Wimbledon final, after beating Maria Sharapova, Svetlana Kuznetsova and Ana Ivanovic in straight sets en route, where she defeated 18th seed Marion Bartoli also in straight sets. Williams thus became only the fourth woman in the open era to win Wimbledon at least four times, along with Billie Jean King, Martina Navratilova and Steffi Graf. She also became the lowest-seeded Wimbledon champion in history, breaking the record she herself set in 2005. Williams returned to the top 20 as a result of the win.

At the 2007 US Open, after setting a Grand-Slam record 129 mph (208 km/h) serve in the opening round, Williams advanced to her first major semifinal outside of Wimbledon since 2003. However she then lost to eventual champion Justine Henin. The tournament resulted in Williams's ranking moving up to No. 9. Williams then won her third title of the year at the Korea Open in Seoul, defeating Maria Kirilenko in the final, before then losing in the final of the Japan Open Tennis Championships in Tokyo to Virginie Razzano. Williams had earned enough points during the year to qualify for the year-ending WTA Championships in Madrid; however, she withdrew because of continuing problems with anemia.

=== 2008: Fifth Wimbledon title, and Olympic gold in doubles ===
In 2008, as the eighth seed at the Australian Open, Williams reached the quarterfinals for the first time since 2003. However, she then lost to eventual runner-up Ana Ivanovic. Williams made her first semifinal of the year at the Bangalore Open in India, where she met sister Serena for the first time since 2005 with Serena Williams winning despite Venus Williams holding a match point in the third set tie break.

Williams missed two tournaments at the beginning of the clay-court season due to undisclosed medical problems. At the French Open, Williams was seeded eighth but was eliminated by 26th-seeded Italian Flavia Pennetta in the third round.

Williams was the defending champion and seventh-seeded player at Wimbledon. Without dropping a set, she reached her seventh Wimbledon singles final. She then won her fifth Wimbledon singles title, and seventh Grand Slam singles title overall, by beating sister Serena in straight sets. This was the first time since 2003 that Venus and Serena Williams had played each other in a Grand Slam final and was the first time since 2001 that Venus had defeated her in a Grand Slam final. Venus and Serena Williams then teamed to win the women's doubles title, their first Grand Slam doubles title together since 2003.

Williams lost in the quarterfinals of the Beijing Olympics to Li Na. She did, however, earn a gold medal along with her sister Serena in women's doubles, their second gold medal as a team, having won together at the Sydney Olympics in 2000. At the 2008 US Open, Williams was playing some of her best tennis since dominating the circuit in 2003, However, she was defeated in two tiebreaks by Serena Williams (the eventual tournament winner) in a close quarterfinal match, after Williams had led 5–3 in both sets.

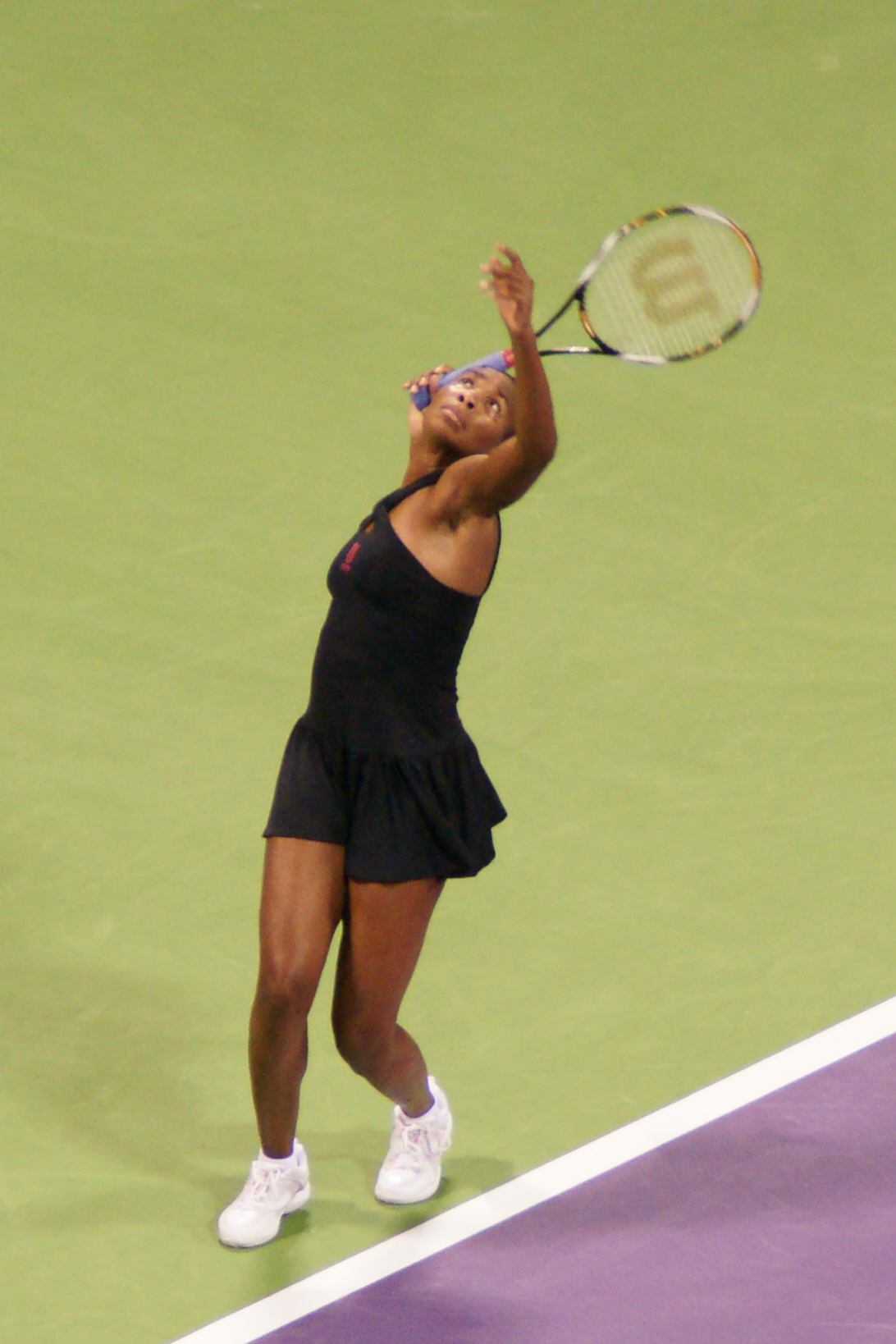
Williams at the 2008 WTA Tour Championships

At the Porsche Tennis Grand Prix in Stuttgart in October, Williams defeated a player ranked in the top three for the first time that season by defeating No. 3 Dinara Safina to reach her third semifinal of the year. There, she lost to Janković. A fortnight later, Williams won the Zurich Open, defeating Ivanovic in the semifinals, before defeating Pennetta in the final to claim her second title of the year and secure a position in the 2008 WTA Tour Championships in Doha. There, Williams defeated No. 2 Safina, No. 3 Serena Williams and No. 5 Dementieva in the preliminary round-robin stage. In the semifinals, Williams defeated No. 1 Janković, before winning the year-ending tournament for the first time by defeating Vera Zvonareva in the final. She ended the year ranked No. 6 with three titles and a winning percentage of 78.

=== 2009: Four consecutive major doubles titles ===
As the sixth seed at the 2009 Australian Open, Williams lost in the second round to Carla Suárez Navarro, after holding a match point in the third set. However, she teamed up with her sister Serena to win the women's doubles title at the event, their eighth Grand Slam doubles title together. Williams rebounded in singles play in February at the Premier 5 (formerly Tier I) Dubai Tennis Championships, defeating defending champion and No. 4 Dementieva in the quarterfinals and No. 1 Serena Williams in the semifinals on a third set tiebreak. The latter win meant that Williams led the head-to-head in career matches with her sister for the first time since 2002. Williams went on to defeat Virginie Razzano in the final. This win meant Williams was ranked in the top five for the first time since 2003, while it also marked her 40th professional singles title, only the twelfth player in the Open era to achieve the feat. Williams won another title the following week at the Abierto Mexicano in Acapulco defeating Pennetta in the final. This was her first title on clay since 2005.

On European clay, Williams reached the semifinals in Rome before losing to No. 1 Safina. This run meant Williams was ranked in the top three for the first time since 2003. Seeded third at the French Open, Williams lost to Ágnes Szávay in the third round, the third consecutive year she had exited at that stage.

Williams was seeded third at Wimbledon. She advanced to her eighth Wimbledon final, at which point she had won 34 straight sets (held since Wimbledon 2007). In the final, however, she lost the first set tie-break, and from then on lost in two sets to sister Serena. The Williams sisters teamed up to win the doubles tournament for the fourth time.

In Stanford, Williams defeated Maria Sharapova and Elena Dementieva to advance to the finals, where she would lose to Marion Bartoli. Teaming with her sister, she played doubles and won the title, defeating Monica Niculescu and Chan Yung-jan.

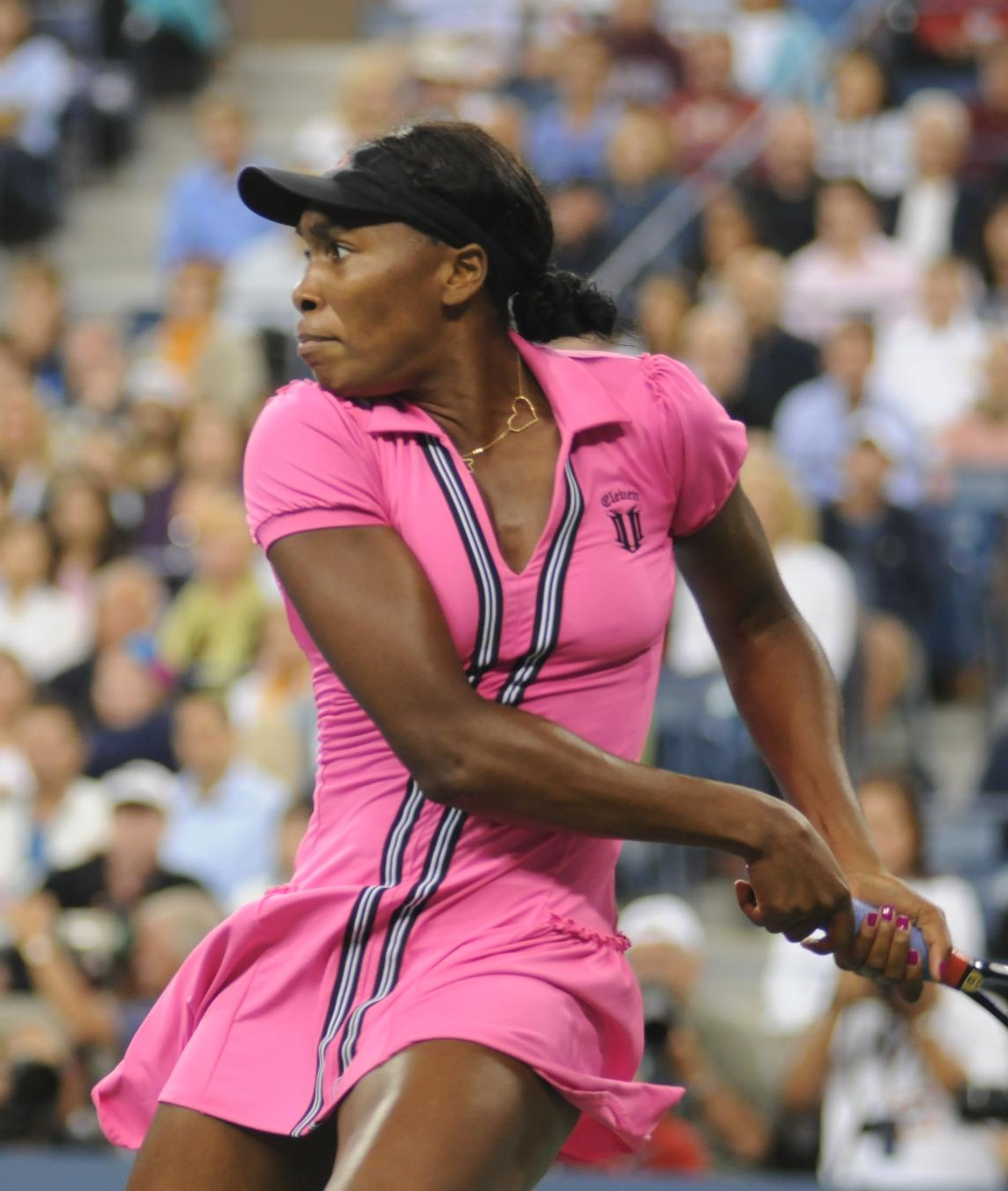
Williams lost at the US Open to the eventual champion Clijsters.

At the 2009 US Open, as the third seed, Williams made it to the fourth round, before losing to Kim Clijsters in three sets. Williams then teamed up with Serena Williams to play doubles at the open, where they won the title over defending champions and No. 1s in doubles, Cara Black and Liezel Huber, claiming their third major doubles title in 2009.

Williams's last tournament in 2009 was the year-ending Tour Championships, where she was the defending champion in singles. She was in the maroon group which includes her sister Serena Williams, along with Elena Dementieva and Svetlana Kuznetsova. She lost her first match against Dementieva, and her second match against her sister Serena- both in straight sets, after taking the first set. In her third and final round-robin match, Williams defeated Kuznetsova. Because of Dementieva's loss to Kuznetsova in their round robin match, Williams advanced to the semifinal of the championships. In her semifinal match, she defeated Jelena Janković of Serbia to advance to her second consecutive final in the tournament which she lost to her sister Serena. In doubles, Williams teamed with her sister as the second seeds. However, they lost to Nuria Llagostera Vives and María José Martínez Sánchez in the semifinal. Their doubles record at the end of the year stood at 24–2.

Williams finished 2009 ranked No. 6 in singles (with a winning percentage of 70 percent) and No. 3 in doubles with Serena Williams, in spite of them playing only six events together that year.

=== 2010: World No. 2 in singles and No. 1 doubles ===
At the 2010 Australian Open, Williams lost to 16th-seeded Li Na in the quarterfinals. In doubles, she and Serena successfully defended their title, defeating the top-ranked team of Cara Black and Liezel Huber in the final. At the Mexican Open in Acapulco, Williams was the defending champion. She reached the semifinals after recovering from a 1–5 third set deficit to Laura Pous Tió in the quarterfinals. In the final, she defeated first-time finalist Polona Hercog from Slovenia. This was her 43rd career title, the most among active female players.

Williams's next tournament was the Premier Mandatory Miami Open in Key Biscayne. She defeated Agnieszka Radwańska in the quarterfinals and Marion Bartoli in the semifinals to reach her third straight WTA Tour final and fourth Miami Open final. She was defeated by Kim Clijsters in the final in just 58 minutes, ending her 15-match winning streak. By reaching the final, her ranking improved to No. 4 and she crossed the $26 million mark in career prize money, the only player besides Serena to do so.

The knee injury that hampered Williams during the Miami Open forced her to skip the Fed Cup tie against Russia and the Porsche Tennis Grand Prix. She returned to the tour at the Premier 5 Italian Open in Rome, where she suffered the worst defeat of her career in the quarterfinals, losing to No. 4 Jelena Janković. Despite this loss, her ranking improved to No. 3. At the Madrid Open, Williams lost to Aravane Rezaï in the final, but won the doubles title with Serena. On May 17, her ranking improved to No. 2, behind Serena. This was the fourth time that the Williams sisters occupied the top two spots, and the first time since May 2003.

Williams played both singles and doubles at the French Open despite her knee injury. She lost in singles to Nadia Petrova in the round of 16. She and Serena defeated Květa Peschke and Katarina Srebotnik in the final to win their fourth consecutive Grand Slam women's doubles title. Their doubles ranking was now No. 1, making Venus and Serena the sixth and seventh women respectively to reach the No. 1 ranking in both singles and doubles.

Williams played at Wimbledon, where she had reached the final the past three years. Despite her knee injury, she made it to the quarterfinals, where she lost to Tsvetana Pironkova. She was the defending champion in doubles with Serena, having won the tournament in the previous two years. However, they lost this time in the quarterfinals to Elena Vesnina and Vera Zvonareva.

Due to injury, Williams missed all the tournaments in the US Open Series, but still played at the 2010 US Open. She defeated Pe'er and French Open champion Schiavone en route to her eighth US Open semifinal, against defending champion Clijsters. Williams won the first set of their match and recovered from 5–2 down in the second set but ultimately double-faulted on a key point near the end of the match and lost in three sets. Because of Serena's withdrawal from the US Open, Venus did not participate at the doubles event, where she was the defending champion.

The recovery of her left knee took longer than expected and it forced her to miss the rest of 2010, including the year-ending WTA Championships and Fed Cup final. Williams ended the year ranked fifth in singles, the first time she ended a year in the top five since 2002, while playing only nine tournaments. She finished the year ranked 11th in doubles.

=== 2011: Sjögren syndrome diagnosis ===
Williams began the year at the final edition of Hong Kong Tennis Classic exhibition event. She lost both her singles matches against Vera Zvonareva and Li Na, but she helped Team America to win the silver group. At the Australian Open, Williams retired in the second game of her third round match against Andrea Petkovic after sustaining a hip muscle injury in her second round. This was Williams's first retirement during a match in a Grand Slam tournament since 1994 and thus ended her record of most Grand Slam matches without ever retiring, with 250 consecutive matches. This was also her first retirement from a match since LA Women's Championships in Los Angeles in 2004, ending her 294 consecutive matches without retiring. The injury forced Williams to pull out of the Fed Cup quarterfinal against Belgium, the Dubai Tennis Championships, and the Mexican Open, where she was the two-time defending champion in both tournaments. She subsequently withdrew from the Miami Open causing her ranking to drop to No. 15. She also missed the clay court season which caused her ranking to drop to No. 29. Her absence from the French Open marked the first Grand Slam tournament since the 2003 US Open where neither of the Williams sisters were competing.

Williams then made her first appearance since the Australian Open in Eastbourne. Unseeded, she lost for the first time in eleven meetings to Daniela Hantuchová in the quarterfinals. She was seeded 23rd at the 2011 Wimbledon Championships. She played for nearly three hours in her second round match against Japanese veteran Kimiko Date-Krumm, winning in three tough sets. She then defeated Spaniard María José Martínez Sánchez in the third round, but was defeated by Bulgarian 32nd seed Tsvetana Pironkova in the fourth round.

Originally scheduled to participate in the 2011 Rogers Cup in Toronto and the 2011 Western & Southern Open in Cincinnati, Williams withdrew due to viral illness. Her next scheduled tournament was the 2011 US Open. Unseeded at the US Open, Williams defeated Vesna Dolonc in the first round. She was scheduled to meet 22nd seed Sabine Lisicki in the second round, but withdrew before the match began after being diagnosed with Sjögren syndrome, an autoimmune disease which causes fatigue and muscle and joint pain. This was the first time in her career that she did not reach the quarterfinals or better in any of the Grand Slam tournaments in a season. As a result, her ranking dropped to one-hundred and five.

Williams did not play for the rest of the year at a competitive level; she appeared in three exhibitions tournaments in November and early December. She played against sister Serena in Colombia, which she won in straight sets. The week later, the sisters appeared in Milan, Italy to play exhibition against Italian duo Francesca Schiavone and Flavia Pennetta. Williams lost both her singles tie-break matches but won the doubles pairing with her sister. Williams played her third exhibition tournament in Barbados where she lost to Victoria Azarenka. She ended the year ranked No. 102. This was her first year-end finish ranked outside of the top 50 since 1997.

=== 2012: Comeback and Olympic gold record ===
Williams was scheduled to play in Auckland in preparation for the Australian Open. but withdrew from both tournaments due to health problems, announcing that she would return to the WTA tour in February. This dropped her ranking to No. 135. In February, Williams returned to competition in the doubles match of the Fed Cup World Group II tie between USA and Belarus. Playing with Liezel Huber, she won the dead-rubber in straight sets.

Williams was granted wildcards to participate in the Miami and Charleston tournaments. In the first round of Miami — her first singles match since the 2011 US Open — Williams defeated Japanese veteran Kimiko Date-Krumm, in straight sets. In the second round, she defeated No. 3 Petra Kvitová, her first top-3 victory since beating Svetlana Kuznetsova in 2009. In the third round, she saved a match point and defeated Aleksandra Wozniak in a three-set tiebreaker that ended a nearly three-hour match. In the round of 16, she bested No. 15 Ana Ivanovic in three sets to reach the quarterfinals, where she lost to the eventual champion, Agnieszka Radwańska in straight sets. Her run improved her ranking to No. 87. A week later in Charleston, she reached her second consecutive quarterfinal, where she lost in three sets to Samantha Stosur.

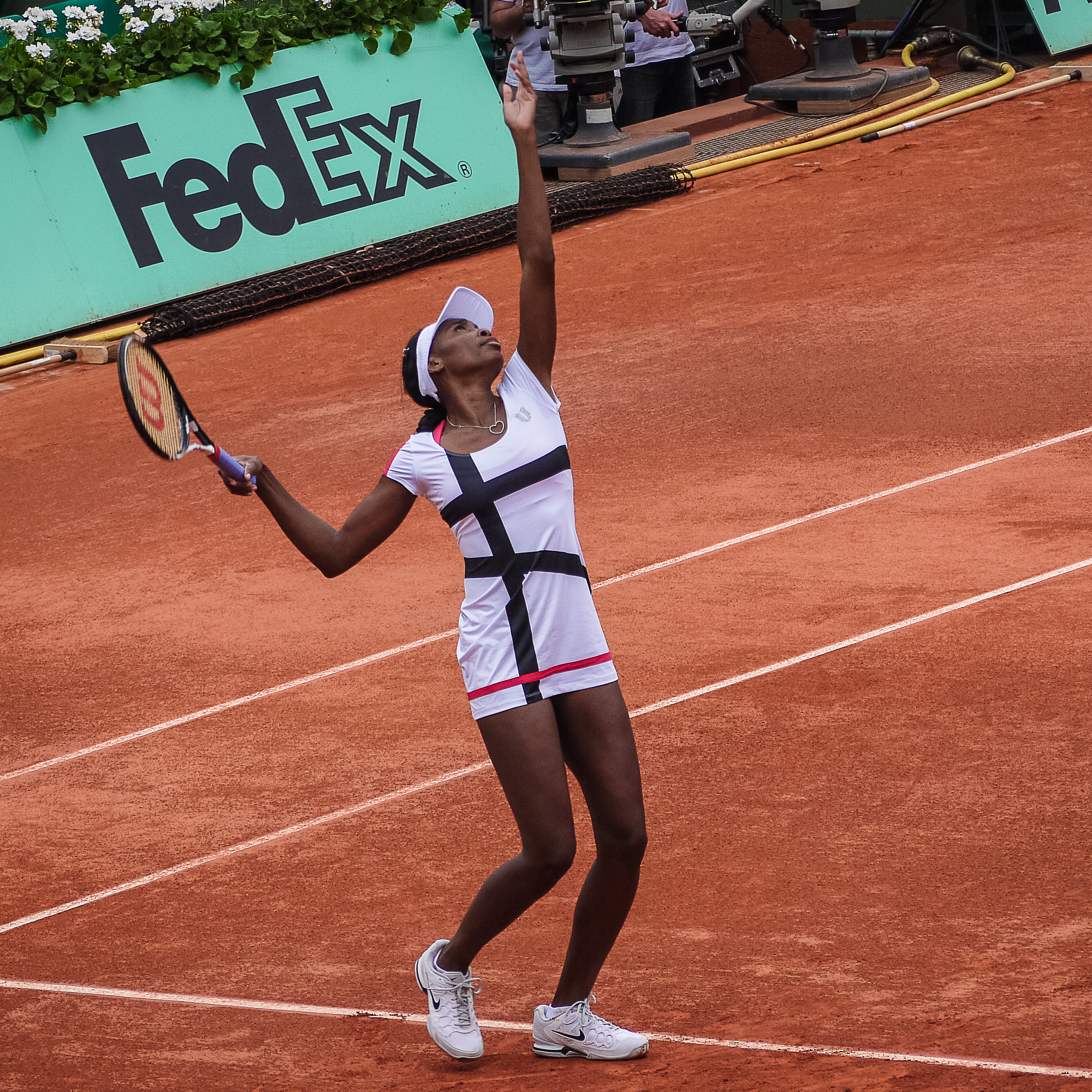
Williams at the 2012 French Open

Williams was granted wildcards to participate in Madrid and Rome. In Madrid, she lost in the second round to Angelique Kerber, but still improved her ranking to No. 63. A week later in Rome, she reached her third quarterfinal of the four tournaments she had participated in with a straight-sets victory against Samantha Stosur in the third round. She lost in the quarterfinals, in straight sets, to the No. 2, defending and eventual champion, Maria Sharapova. Her appearance in Rome increased her ranking to No. 52, placing her as the third-ranked American. She lost in the second round of the French Open to Agnieszka Radwańska, in straight sets.

At Wimbledon, Williams was unseeded for the first time since 1997. She lost to Elena Vesnina in the first round in straight sets. This was the first time Williams lost in the first round of a Grand Slam since the 2006 Australian Open, and her first opening round loss at Wimbledon since her debut in 1997. Williams fared better in her return to doubles competition where she played alongside her sister Serena. In just the pair's first tournament since 2010 Wimbledon, the unseeded sisters advanced to the final with victories over fourth-seeds Maria Kirilenko and Nadia Petrova in the second round and top-seeds Liezel Huber and Lisa Raymond in the semifinals. The Williams sisters claimed their fifth Wimbledon doubles title after defeating sixth-seeds Andrea Hlaváčková and Lucie Hradecká in straight sets in the final, on the same day Serena Williams won her fifth Wimbledon singles title.

Williams's next stop was the 2012 London Olympics. She entered the women's singles and women's doubles events, partnering with sister Serena in doubles. In singles, Williams reached the third round where she lost to Angelique Kerber. In doubles, the unseeded Williams sisters advanced to the final, which was a repeat of their final at Wimbledon against Hlaváčková and Hradecká. The sisters won their third gold medal in doubles after defeating the Czech pair in straight sets. With the win (and her sister Serena's win in the singles event), the Williams sisters claimed the most Olympic gold medals of any other tennis player, male or female.

Next, Williams played at Cincinnati where she received a singles wild card entry. She defeated her first two opponents, Maria Kirilenko and Chanelle Scheepers, in three tight sets before eliminating eighth seed Sara Errani in the third round. In the quarterfinal, she defeated Samantha Stosur, in three sets. In the semifinal Williams played through a back injury, eventually losing in three sets to Li Na. Her semifinal run brought her ranking back within the top 50 for the first time in almost a year. At the US Open, Williams lost in a second-round match against Angelique Kerber in three sets, despite having a lead in the third set.

Williams won her 44th career title and her first title in over 2 1/2 years at the Luxembourg Open, where she defeated Monica Niculescu in straight sets. Williams also qualified for the Tournament of Champions in Sofia, but withdrew as the tournament clashed with her and her sister Serena's 'Breaking the Mould' tour in Africa. With her title in Luxembourg, her ranking rose to No. 24. She ended the year with this ranking.

=== 2013: Back injury ===
At the 2013 Hopman Cup, and playing for USA (with John Isner), the first rubber was against South Africa. Williams beat Chanelle Scheepers and, with John Isner, they comfortably defeated the South African pair Scheepers and Kevin Anderson. In USA's second rubber against France, she won both her singles and in mixed doubles defeated Jo-Wilfried Tsonga and Mathilde Johansson. Next she faced Anabel Medina Garrigues of Spain and won in two sets.

From there Williams went onto the Australian Open, seeded 25, after missing it the previous year due to injury. She beat Galina Voskoboeva and Alizé Cornet before losing to the second seed, Maria Sharapova. Her next tournament was Brasil Tennis Cup. She participated the tournament as the top seed. She defeated Mirjana Lučić-Baroni in the first round, Garbiñe Muguruza in the second round and Magdaléna Rybáriková during the quarterfinals. Reaching her first semifinal of the year, she was then defeated by Olga Puchkova in three sets. This tournament allowed Williams to strengthen her position in the top 20. She retired from the Miami Open in the third round due to a lower back injury.

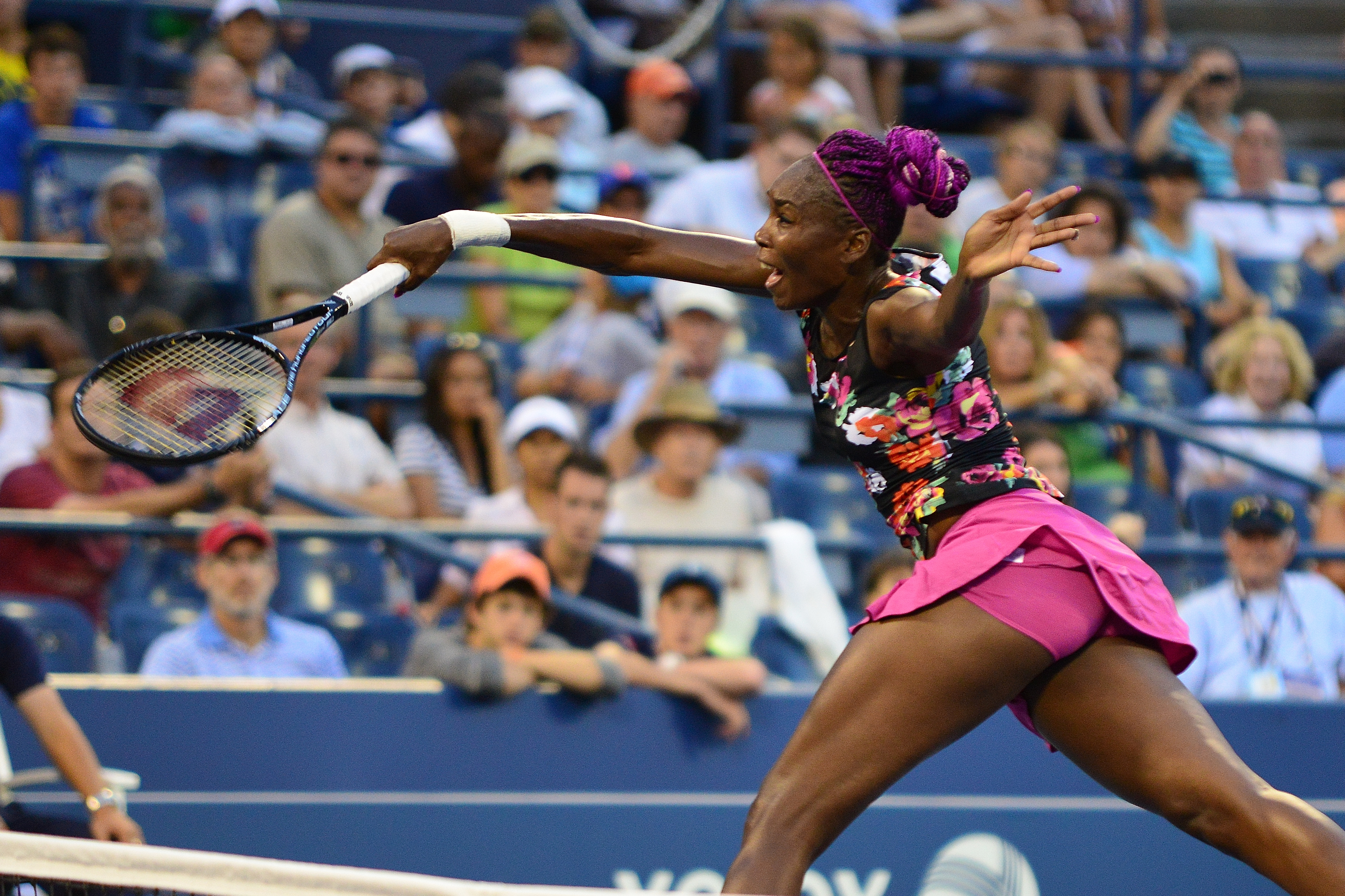
Williams stretches for a volley at the 2013 US Open

One week after Miami, Williams participated in Charleston as the fifth seed. She reached the semifinals, where she lost to her sister Serena in two sets in the sisters' first meeting since the 2009 WTA Tour Championships. A few weeks later she participated in Fed Cup, in a tie between the United States and Sweden. After Sloane Stephens lost the opening match, Williams stepped into her spot, winning a match against Johanna Larsson. This was the first time in Williams's career that she clinched the winning match in a Fed Cup tie, leading the United States to a 3–2 victory over Sweden. Williams's next event was the Madrid Open where she withdrew just before playing her first round match. Her next tournament was the Italian Open in Rome where she lost in the first round to Laura Robson. Williams then played at the 2013 French Open where she lost to Urszula Radwańska in the first round. She was also entered in doubles with her sister Serena but pulled out just before their first-round match. Williams pulled out of the 2013 Wimbledon Championships due to a back injury. It was the first time she missed Wimbledon in her career.

At the Roger's Cup, she lost in the first round to 13th seed Kirsten Flipkens in three sets. At the Western and Southern Open, she defeated qualifier Jana Čepelová in straight sets, before losing in the second round to Elena Vesnina in three sets. Her next tournament was the 2013 US Open. She pulled an upset in the first round by defeating 12th seed Kirsten Flipkens in a rematch of the Roger's Cup first round. She was defeated by Zheng Jie in three sets. She entered the doubles with Serena Williams. Their run ended in the semifinals against the fifth seeded team and eventual champions Lucie Hradecká and Andrea Hlaváčková.

Her next tournament was the Pan Pacific Open. In the quarterfinals she defeated Canadian Eugenie Bouchard in three sets, but fell in the semifinals to Petra Kvitová in another three set match. Williams subsequently played at the 2013 China Open in Beijing where she played singles and doubles. Williams lost her second round match in singles losing to Sabine Lisicki and she also lost her first round match in doubles despite having two match points. Williams's last tournament of the season was the 2013 Kremlin Cup in Moscow, but she withdrew due to injury, bringing an end to her 2013 season.

=== 2014: Ending title drought ===
Williams started her official tennis season as No. 47 in Auckland, where she finished runner-up to Ana Ivanovic. She next participated, unseeded, at the Australian Open where she lost in the first round to No. 23 Ekaterina Makarova in three sets. Moving on to Doha, Williams lost to No. 6 Petra Kvitová in the second round at the Qatar Open after failing to put away match point in the third set tie-break. Williams then entered the Dubai Tennis Championships where she defeated five top-40 players to win her biggest title since the Madrid Open in 2010 and, at 33 years and 8 months of age, became the seventh-oldest woman to win a WTA singles title. En route, she avenged her loss to Ana Ivanovic in Auckland and her sister Serena's loss to Alizé Cornet in the semifinals, then won the title match, keeping her head-to-head record perfect against Caroline Wozniacki. Williams then competed in Miami and in Charleston where she lost to Dominika Cibulková on hard and Eugenie Bouchard on clay, respectively – both in the round of 16 and both in three sets. At the Italian Open, Williams failed to force three sets in a loss for the first time that year, falling in two sets to Carla Suárez Navarro. At the French Open, Williams was upset by No. 56 Anna Karolína Schmiedlová in three sets. Williams then lost in the third round of Wimbledon to eventual champion Petra Kvitová in a classic and much-praised encounter that saw 34 holds of serve and only two breaks. Williams was the only player to take a set against Kvitová in the tournament.

Williams played her first tournament of the 2014 US Open Series at the Standord Classic, where she is a two-time former champion. In the second round, she scored her first Top-10 victory of the year and improved her head-to-head record against Victoria Azarenka to 4–0. In the quarterfinals, Williams lost to No. 18 Andrea Petkovic in three sets.

At the Rogers Cup, Williams defeated No. 24 Anastasia Pavlyuchenkova in three sets, scoring her first victory at that tournament on her fifth attempt. She defeated No. 7 Angelique Kerber in the third round in a three-set thriller described by one of the commentators as "quite simply one of the matches of the 2014 season so far on the WTA". Williams produced yet another upset in three sets against Suárez Navarro to advance to the semifinals, where she defeated younger sister and No. 1 Serena Williams in the pair's 25th meeting. It was her 14th victory over a reigning No. 1 and her first since the 2009 Wimbledon Championships, when she defeated Dinara Safina 6–1, 6–0 in the semifinals. It was also the first time since 2009 that Williams had beaten her younger sister Serena. She lost the championship match to No. 5 Agnieszka Radwańska.

At her final tournament before the US Open, Williams lost in a tight three-setter to No. 17, Lucie Šafářová, in the first round at the Cincinnati Open. At the 2014 US Open Williams made it to the third round for the first time since 2010 and was two points away (multiple times) from moving into the Round of 16 before ultimately going down to 13th-seeded Sara Errani for the first time in four meetings.

Williams's next tournament was at the Bell Challenge in Quebec, where she received a wildcard as the No. 1 seed. She advanced to the quarterfinals in straight-set first- and second-round victories and was set to play Czech player Lucie Hradecká. She defeated Hradecká in a 2-hour, 13-minute match in three sets. In the semifinal, Williams beat fellow countrywomen Shelby Rogers in straight sets to progress to her fourth final of the year, where she lost to a resurgent Mirjana Lučić-Baroni in straight sets. Williams then played at the Wuhan Open, where she lost in the first round to Caroline Garcia despite having held a match point. Her final tournament of the year was at the China Open, where she won her first two matches before withdrawing before the third round. Williams ended the year ranked No. 19 in singles, the first finish since 2010 inside the top 20. Williams joined the Bangalore Raptors team in 2014 for the first edition of Champions Tennis League India.

=== 2015: Re-entering the top 10 ===
Williams started off her season at the Auckland Open, where she won her 46th career singles title by defeating Caroline Wozniacki in three sets in the final. Then, at the Australian Open, Williams made it to the quarterfinals at a Grand Slam championship for the first time since the 2010 US Open. She defeated Camila Giorgi in the third round having to recover from a set and break down to reach the second week of a Grand Slam tournament for the first time since the 2011 Wimbledon Championships and then overturned a three-match losing streak to Agnieszka Radwańska before losing to Madison Keys after being up a break in the deciding set. Williams had her 16-match winning streak at the Dubai Tennis Championships ended by Lucie Šafářová in the third round. Her next tournament was at the Qatar Open where she saved a match point in a heated encounter versus Barbora Záhlavová-Strýcová in the second round before defeating Agnieszka Radwańska for a second time in 2015 to advance to the semifinals. She ended up losing in three sets to Victoria Azarenka. Williams competed at the Miami Open, where she won against Samantha Stosur in the third round and Caroline Wozniacki in the fourth round (scoring her fourth top-10 win of the season and improving her head-to-head record against Wozniacki to a perfect 7–0). In the quarterfinals, she was defeated by Suárez Navarro, in three sets.

Williams began her clay-court season at the Madrid Open where she lost in the first round to Victoria Azarenka in straight sets. She made it to the third round of the Italian Open, before losing to Simona Halep. Williams failed to win her opening match at the French Open, where she lost in straight sets to Sloane Stephens. She did not attend her mandatory post-match press conference and was subsequently fined $3000. Williams then played at Wimbledon, winning her first three rounds in straight sets. She then lost to her sister, Serena, in the fourth round in straight sets. Williams then played at the İstanbul Cup where she lost in the first round to qualifier Kateryna Bondarenko.

Williams began her US Open series at the Rogers Cup, where she was a finalist last year. She lost in the first round to Sabine Lisicki. Her loss pushed her outside of the top 20. Her next tournament was at the Cincinnati Open. She made it to the second round and was set to play Ana Ivanovic, before she withdrew due to a virus.

She was seeded 23rd for the 2015 US Open and played Monica Puig in the first round. She won in three tough sets. In the second round, she overcame two costly double faults in the second set to defeat fellow American Irina Falconi. She defeated 12th seed Belinda Bencic and qualifier Anett Kontaveit in straight sets in the third and fourth rounds, respectively. Williams played her sister Serena in the quarterfinals in their fifth meeting at the US Open and their 27th meeting overall. Williams lost the match in three sets.

Williams scored her fifth top 10 win of the season by defeating No. 7, Agnieszka Radwańska, in the first round of the Wuhan Open. She then beat qualifier Julia Görges in the second round for her 700th career win (becoming only the ninth woman in the Open Era to achieve this feat). She landed another top 10 victory by winning against No. 10 Suárez Navarro in the third round. Williams defeated both Johanna Konta and Roberta Vinci (saving match point) in three sets to move into the championship match where she won her biggest title in more than five years when her opponent, No. 8 Garbiñe Muguruza, retired while trailing a set and a double break. The next week Williams lost to Ana Ivanovic in the second round of the China Open. She made it to the semifinals of the Hong Kong Open where she lost in a tight two-setter to eventual champion Jelena Janković.

With her results throughout the season, Williams became an Alternate for the WTA Finals in Singapore. Additionally, she qualified for the WTA Elite Trophy in Zhuhai where she is the number one seed. She defeated Madison Keys in her first round-robin match in three sets. In her second round-robin match she defeated wildcard Zheng Saisai to advance to the semifinals, where she defeated Roberta Vinci for a fifth consecutive time. Williams captured the first WTA Elite Trophy, her third WTA title of the season and 48th title of her career by defeating Karolína Plíšková, in the final. She re-entered the top ten for the first time since 2011 and ended the year at No. 7 in the WTA rankings. Williams was the 10th most popular player of the year according to the WTA's website and received the WTA Comeback Player of the Year award.

=== 2016: Wimbledon semifinal ===
Williams began 2016 by playing at the World Tennis Thailand Championship – an exhibition event in Thailand – where she lost to Sara Errani and Angelique Kerber. She then entered the Auckland Open, where she was the No. 1 seed and defending champion, and lost in the first round to 18-year-old Daria Kasatkina. (This was also Williams's first tournament since the 2011 Australian Open as a top-10 player.) At the Australian Open, Williams, seeded 8th, lost to Johanna Konta in the first round. Afterwards, she helped the USA Fed Cup Team to a 4–0 victory over Poland, winning both of her singles matches. Williams's next tournament was at the Taiwan Open, where she was the No. 1 seed. She defeated Misaki Doi in the final, earning her 49th career title.

Williams returned to Indian Wells for the first time in 15 years after boycotting the tournament in 2001, but lost in the second round to Kurumi Nara. The following week, she was knocked out in the second round of the Miami Open by qualifier Elena Vesnina. Both results marked her worst exits at Indian Wells and Miami in her 23-year career. She began the clay-court season with a win over Alison Riske at the Charleston Open, before losing to Yulia Putintseva in the third round in three tight sets. Williams was scheduled to begin her clay-court season at the Madrid Open but withdrew due to a hamstring injury. The following week, she lost in the second round in Rome. Seeded ninth at the French Open, Williams won her first two rounds in straight sets to set up a third-round clash with Alizé Cornet, whom she defeated in three sets to reach the fourth round for the first time since 2010. She recorded the 200th loss of her career against 8th-seeded Timea Bacsinszky, who won in straight sets. However, her result pushed her back into the top 10 for the first time since her loss at the Australian Open. She also won her first Grand Slam doubles match with sister Serena Williams since the 2014 US Open.

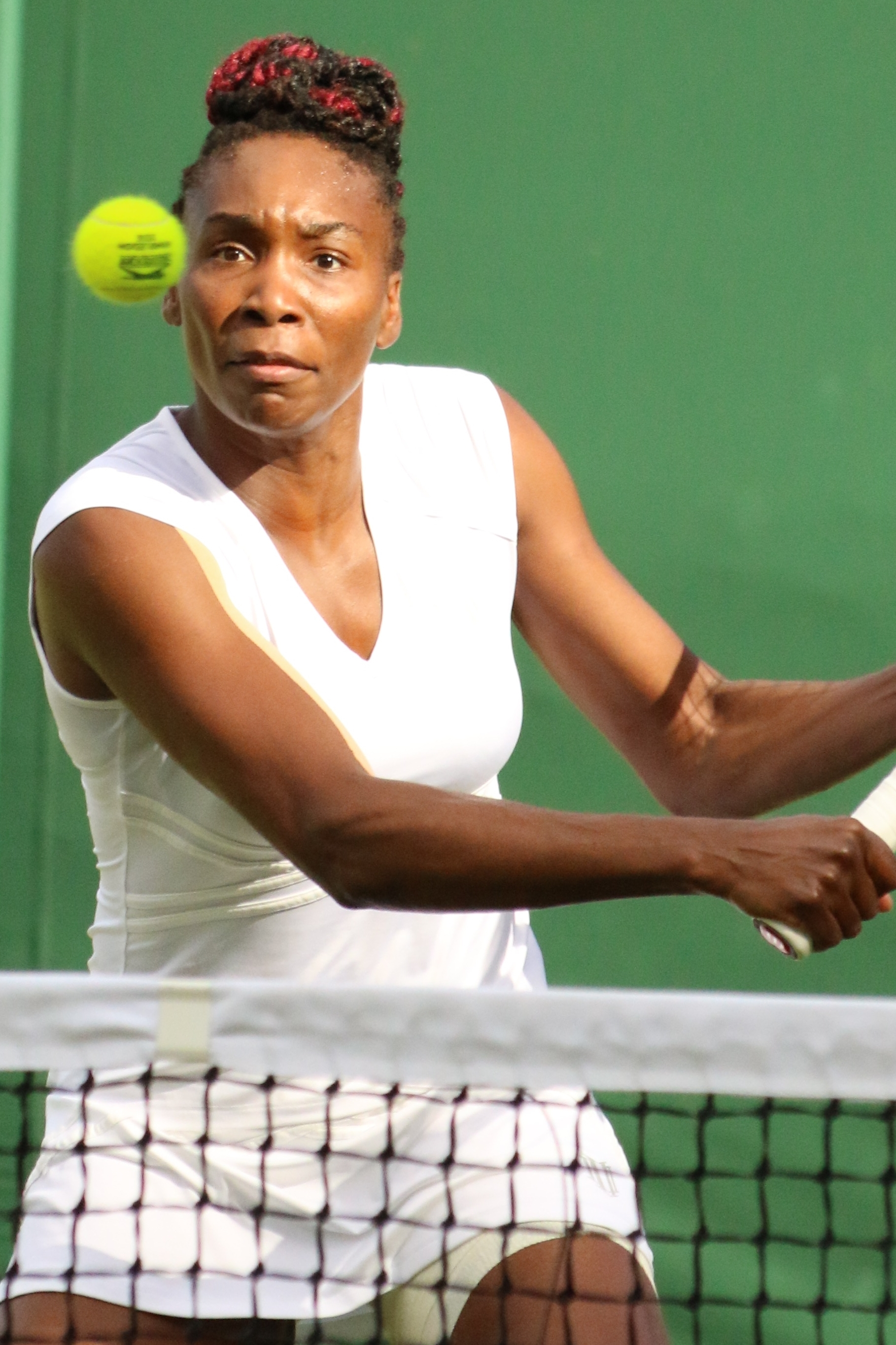
Williams at the 2016 Wimbledon Championships

At the Wimbledon Championships, Williams reached the third round of the championships where she overcame the 29th seed, Daria Kasatkina, in a 2-hour, 42-minute marathon. She defeated 12th seed Carla Suárez Navarro in the fourth round, and now leads 4–3 in their head-to-head meetings. Williams advanced to the quarterfinals for the first time in six years, where she defeated Yaroslava Shvedova. In her first major semifinal since the 2010 US Open and her first Wimbledon semifinal since 2009, she lost to fourth seed Angelique Kerber in straight sets. In the doubles tournament, Venus and Serena Williams advanced to their first major final since 2012. They then won their 14th major title together and sixth at Wimbledon.

Williams began her US Open Series at the Stanford Classic, where she was the No. 1 seed. She defeated Magda Linette in the second round and compatriots Catherine Bellis and Alison Riske in the quarterfinals and semifinals, respectively, to reach her eighth final in Stanford. She lost to Johanna Konta, in three sets. By virtue of her result, Williams ascended to No. 6 in the rankings, her highest position since being diagnosed with Sjögren's syndrome in 2011. Williams then entered the Rogers Cup. Having received a bye in the first round, Williams won her second-round match against Barbora Strýcová, in straight sets. She fell to Madison Keys in the third round in three sets.

Williams failed to medal in her singles and doubles events at the 2016 Rio Summer Olympics, falling in the first round in both events, marking her worst exits of her Olympic career. She entered the mixed doubles event with Rajeev Ram, defeating the Netherlands in the first round after saving match point. The pair then defeated Italy in the quarterfinals and India in the semifinals to set up a clash with the United States team of Bethanie Mattek-Sands and Jack Sock in the gold medal match. The duo lost to Mattek-Sands and Sock. By winning a silver medal, Williams became the only female player (besides Kathleen McKane Godfree) to win a medal in all three events (singles, doubles and mixed); her five medals mean she now shares the record for most Olympic medals won in tennis with Godfree.

At the 2016 US Open, Williams broke the record for the most major appearances, surpassing Amy Frazier's record of 71. This is also the first time that she's been seeded in the top ten at all four Grand Slam tournaments this year, having last achieved this in 2010. She won her first three-round matches respectively against Kateryna Kozlova, Julia Görges and the 26th seed Laura Siegemund. She lost in the fourth round to 10th seed Karolína Plíšková after failing to convert match point.

In September 2016, in response to WADA database leak, Williams confirmed the usage of banned substances classified by WADA as Therapeutic Use Exemptions (TUEs), stating: "The applications for TUEs under the Tennis Anti-Doping program require a strict process for approval which I have adhered to when serious medical conditions have occurred".

Williams failed to defend her title in Wuhan, falling in the third round to ninth seed Svetlana Kuznetsova. This pushed her outside of the top ten for a second time this year. The following week she was bundled out of the China Open in the first round by No. 223-ranked Peng Shuai. Williams qualified for the WTA Elite Trophy, where she was the defending champion, however she decided not to participate. She finished the year ranked No. 17.

=== 2017: Two major finals and return to the top 5 ===
Williams began her 2017 season at Auckland, winning her opening match against local wildcard Jade Lewis before withdrawing due to a right arm pain. Seeded 13th at the Australian Open, Williams defeated Kateryna Kozlova, qualifier Stefanie Vögele, Duan Yingying and qualifier Mona Barthel in the opening four rounds respectively in straight sets to advance to the quarterfinals. She defeated 24th seed Anastasia Pavlyuchenkova for her 50th win at the Australian Open, the first time Williams won a quarterfinal match in Melbourne since defeating Daniela Hantuchová in 2003. Coming back from a set down in her semifinal match, Williams defeated rising American star CoCo Vandeweghe to advance to her first Grand Slam final since Wimbledon 2009 and her first Australian Open final since 2003. In doing so, she set the Open era record for the longest span (20 years) between grand slam singles final appearances, having first reached a Grand Slam singles final at the 1997 US Open. In a closely fought final, she lost in two sets to her younger sister Serena, who made history by winning her 23rd Grand Slam singles title, surpassing the mark set by Steffi Graf. The following week, Williams competed in the St. Petersburg Ladies' Trophy, but lost in the second round to eventual champion Kristina Mladenovic. At the Indian Wells Open, Williams came back from a set down and saved three match points in the second round to defeat Jelena Janković, tying their head-to-head record at seven-all. This was her first win at Indian Wells since 2001. She defeated Lucie Šafářová and qualifier Peng Shuai in the third and fourth rounds respectively, avenging her previous losses to both players. She lost to the eventual champion, Elena Vesnina, in the quarterfinals. The following week, Williams scored her first top-ten win since 2015, against Svetlana Kuznetsova in the fourth round of the Miami Open. She defeated No. 1 Angelique Kerber in the quarterfinals, becoming the oldest player to beat a current No. 1. She lost for a third consecutive time to eventual champion Johanna Konta in straight sets in her first semifinal in Miami since 2010. This marked her fourth consecutive loss to eventual champions.

The following week, after receiving a bye, Williams lost to eventual semifinalist Laura Siegemund in the Volvo Car Open. Having saved match point in the second set, Williams forced two match points in the third set, but Siegemund saved both. After the match, Williams said, "This could be the best match she'll ever play in her life. I basically won the match but still lost." Williams withdrew from the Madrid Open after an injury to her right arm. She made her European clay-court debut at the |Italian Open where she defeated Yaroslava Shvedova and Lesia Tsurenko in straight sets. She defeated No. 6 Johanna Konta in the third round, but lost in her first quarterfinal in Rome since 2012 to Garbiñe Muguruza in three sets. During this match, Williams hit a reactionary lob off an attacking forehand that was voted WTA shot of the month. Williams defeated Wang Qiang, Kurumi Nara and Elise Mertens in the first three rounds of the French Open before again losing to Bacsinszky in the fourth round, this time in three sets.

Williams entered Wimbledon as the number 10 seed. She defeated Elise Mertens, Wang Qiang, Naomi Osaka and Ana Konjuh to reach the quarterfinals for the 13th time in her career, where she defeated the 2017 French Open champion Jeļena Ostapenko in straight sets. This was also her 100th career match at Wimbledon. She advanced to her ninth Wimbledon final by defeating Johanna Konta, in straight sets in the semifinals. This marked her 87th win at Wimbledon, the third most on the all-time list. This also marked the first season since 2003 that Williams reached two slam finals. Williams lost the final in straight sets to Garbiñe Muguruza. She gained the No. 9 ranking by reaching the final, her second appearance in the top 10 in 2017; she had briefly returned to the top 10 in 2017 by virtue of beating Angelique Kerber in Miami.

Williams began her play in the US Open Series at the Canadian Open. She defeated qualifier Irina-Camelia Begu in three sets and Kateřina Siniaková in straight sets before losing to fifth seed and eventual champion Elina Svitolina in the third round. The next week, Williams competed in Cincinnati and defeated Alison Riske in the first round before losing to Ashleigh Barty in the second round. Barty was the first person to have defeated Williams and fail to reach at least the semifinals of the event in which they had defeated her in 2017. At the 2017 US Open, Williams defeated Viktória Kužmová, Océane Dodin, and Maria Sakkari to reach the fourth round. Williams reached the second week of all majors in a single season for the first time since 2010, and reached the second week of seven consecutive Grand Slam tournaments, the longest streak among WTA players at that time. In the fourth round, Williams beat Suárez Navarro in three sets to reach her 12th US Open quarterfinal, where she defeated Petra Kvitová in a third set tiebreak during the two-hour, 35-minute match. She also guaranteed her return to the top five in the WTA rankings at the conclusion of the tournament for the first time since January 2011. Williams then lost in three sets to fellow American and eventual champion Sloane Stephens in her first US Open semifinal since 2010.

On September 26, Williams qualified for the WTA Finals for the first time since 2010. In her first tournament after the US Open, Williams defeated Risa Ozaki in the first round of the Hong Kong Open, before falling to Naomi Osaka. At the WTA Finals, Williams was placed in the White Group with Karolína Plíšková, Garbiñe Muguruza and Jeļena Ostapenko. After losing her first match to Pliskova in straight sets, Williams defeated Ostapenko in a marathon match lasting almost 3 1/2 hours. She defeated Muguruza in straight sets to progress to the semifinals, avenging her loss to the Spaniard in the Wimbledon final. Williams then defeated Caroline Garcia in three sets to advance to her first final at the year-end championships since 2009, where she finished runner-up to sister Serena Williams. She met Caroline Wozniacki in the final, where she found herself down a set and 0–5. Despite winning the next four games, she lost the match in two sets. She finished the year ranked No. 5 and topped the prize money list for this year.

=== 2018: 1000th match, struggle with form ===
Williams began her 2018 season at the Sydney International, where she was the second seed and received a first-round bye. In the second round she lost to Angelique Kerber, who went on to win the tournament. As the fifth seed and defending finalist at the Australian Open, Williams lost in straight sets to Belinda Bencic in the first round, ending her streak of seven consecutive appearances in the second week of the Grand Slams, and as a result dropping considerably in the rankings as well.

Williams competed in the Fed Cup quarterfinals against the Dutch team. She won both her singles matches in straight sets against Arantxa Rus and Richèl Hogenkamp to send the United States into the semifinals. She also played her career 1000th match and earned her 20th Fed Cup singles win.

After receiving a first round bye at the Indian Wells Open, Williams defeated Sorana Cîrstea to set up a match with her sister Serena, in the third round. She defeated her for the 12th time in her career – her first straight sets victory against her since the 2008 Wimbledon Championships final almost a decade earlier. She then defeated Anastasija Sevastova in the fourth round and Suarez Navarro in the quarterfinals, both in straight sets. She then fell to Daria Kasatkina in a close three set match in the semifinals. The following week at the Miami Open, Williams saved three match points in her third round match against Dutch woman Kiki Bertens. She subsequently knocked out defending champion Johanna Konta in the fourth round, before falling rather unexpectedly to her compatriot and qualifier Danielle Collins in the quarterfinals.

Williams began her clay court season at the Madrid Open where she lost to Anett Kontaveit in the first round. Seeded eighth at the Italian Open, she received a first round bye, before defeating Elena Vesnina in three sets. She lost to Kontaveit again in the third round. Williams also played doubles with compatriot Madison Keys, but the team withdrew after winning their first round match with Keys sustaining an injury. Williams lost to Wang Qiang in the first round of the French Open, marking the first time she has lost in the first round of consecutive Grand Slam events. Williams also reached the third round in doubles with Serena, losing to third seeds Klepač and Martínez Sánchez.

The defending finalist at the Wimbledon, Williams defeated Johanna Larsson and Alexandra Dulgheru in the first and second rounds respectively, before losing to Kiki Bertens in the third round. As a result, she dropped out of the top ten rankings.

Williams began her US Open Series at the Silicon Valley Classic after accepting a wildcard, defeating Heather Watson in the second round, before losing in the quarterfinals to eventual finalist Maria Sakkari. She won her opening two rounds at the Rogers Cup before losing to the then-world No. 1, Simona Halep, hampered by a right knee injury. She withdrew from the Western & Southern Open the following week with the same injury.

At the 2018 US Open, Williams defeated 2004 champion Svetlana Kuznetsova and Camila Giorgi en route to a third round encounter – and 30th career match overall, with Serena, where she was handed her most-lopsided loss against her in five years. Following the US Open, Venus withdrew from the Wuhan Open and China Open, citing "she was not physically ready to compete". She was scheduled to finish her season at the Luxembourg Open, but pulled out due to a knee injury. She finished the season ranked No. 40, the first time since 2013 she failed to finish the season inside the top 20.

Williams parted ways with her long-time coach David Witt at the end of the 2018 season.

=== 2019: Continued struggles, out of top 50 ===
Williams began her 2019 season with an exhibition match against Serena at the Mubadala World Tennis Championship, which she won in the match tiebreak. Williams then played in the ASB Classic in Auckland, where she was seeded sixth. She defeated Victoria Azarenka and Lauren Davis, before losing in the quarterfinals to Bianca Andreescu in three sets. Unseeded at the Australian Open, Williams defeated Mihaela Buzărnescu and Alizé Cornet, both in three sets, to set up a meeting with the topseeded Simona Halep in the third round. Williams lost to Halep in two sets.

Ranked 36th and unseeded at Indian Wells, Williams started with a win over Andrea Petkovic, before coming back from a set and a double break down to beat the third seed Petra Kvitová in the second round. This was Williams's first top five win since the 2017 WTA Finals. She then defeated Christina McHale and Mona Barthel to advance to her third straight Indian Wells quarterfinal, where she lost to the eighth seed and eventual runner-up, Angelique Kerber.

Ranked 43rd as she entered the Miami Open, Williams beat Dalila Jakupović, Suarez Navarro and Daria Kasatkina, all in straight sets, before falling again to third ranked Simona Halep in the fourth round.

Williams started her clay-court season as a wildcard at the Italian Open where she defeated Elise Mertens in a third set tiebreak (after three hours of play) to set up a second round match with her sister Serena. Due to a left knee injury, however, Serena was forced to withdraw from the match. Williams then fell to eventual runner-up Johanna Konta in the third round in straight sets. She subsequently fell to the ninth seed, Elina Svitolina, in the French Open first round, her second year in a row failing to win a match at the French Open.

For the first time since 2011 and fourth time in her career, Williams played a Wimbledon warmup event after accepting a wildcard into the Birmingham Classic. She defeated Aliaksandra Sasnovich in the first round to set up a meeting with Wang Qiang, which Williams also won to reach the quarterfinals, where she lost to eventual champion and new world No. 1, Ashleigh Barty. However, thanks to this run, Williams returned to the top 50 in the rankings. She also accepted a wildcard to play doubles with Harriet Dart, losing in the first round in a match tiebreak. At Wimbledon, Williams faced Coco Gauff, the youngest qualifier in the history of the event at 15 years old. Gauff defeated Williams in a tight two-set match.

=== 2020: Out of top 75 ===
Williams was scheduled to start her 2020 season at the Brisbane International but withdrew before the tournament began. She also withdrew from the Adelaide International. At the Australian Open, Williams was beaten by Coco Gauff in the first round. At the Mexican Open, where she was the fifth seed, Williams was beaten by qualifier Kaja Juvan.

After a four-month break due to the COVID-19 pandemic, Williams returned to competition by playing World TeamTennis. Her first official tournament back was the Top Seed Open, where she defeated Victoria Azarenka in the first round, then took on Serena in the second round, losing to her in a tight three-set match. Williams then fell to Dayana Yastremska in the first round of the Western & Southern Open. Following the tournament, Williams dropped to No. 67 in the WTA rankings.

Williams lost to Azarenka at the Italian Open, then fell to Anna Karolína Schmiedlová at the French Open. She finished the year with one match win and a 1–8 tour record. Her ranking fell to 78 in the world by the end of the season.

=== 2021–2022: Out of the top 100, 90th major appearance ===
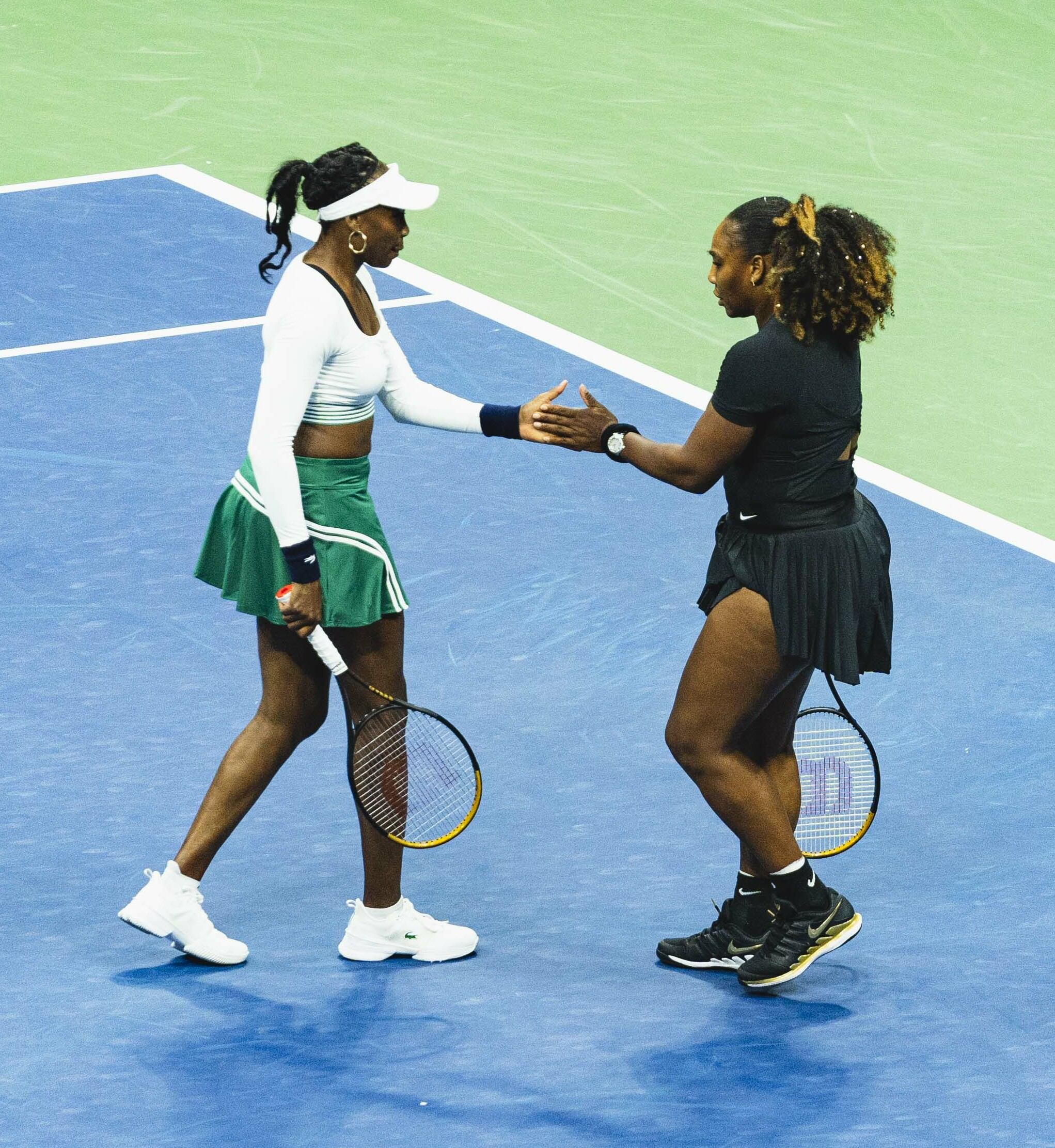
The Williams sisters in 2022 during their final doubles match together

Williams started the 2021 season at the Yarra Valley Classic, where she defeated Arantxa Rus, in straight sets, before losing in straight sets to fourth seed Petra Kvitová. She also reached the second round of the Australian Open. Since then, Williams was on a five-match losing streak and dropped out of the top 100 in May, before the French Open, to her lowest ranking since 2011. At the French Open, she lost in the first round to the 32nd seed, Ekaterina Alexandrova. She received a wildcard for the main draw of Wimbledon but she was later upgraded to the main draw as direct entry due to Naomi Osaka's withdrawal. She won her first round match against Mihaela Buzărnescu. This was Venus Williams's record breaking 90th Grand Slam appearance and also her 90th match win at Wimbledon.

She missed the next four Grand Slam tournaments in singles before receiving a wildcard for the 2022 US Open. She lost in the first round in straight sets to Alison Van Uytvanck. She also played doubles with Serena at the US Open. Their first round match was the first doubles match in history to be given the nighttime slot on Arthur Ashe Stadium. The pair lost to Lucie Hradecká and Linda Nosková. With Serena's retirement, this was the final Grand Slam tournament match for the 14-time major doubles champions. Venus later stated that when Serena retired, she too retired from playing doubles.

=== 2023: 30th year on the WTA Tour, ongoing struggle with injuries ===
In January, she received a wildcard for the main draw of Auckland Open, and started her 30th year on the WTA Tour with a straight-sets victory over fellow American Katie Volynets in the first round. She opened the second round by winning the first set against Zhu Lin but then went on to lose the match when she dropped the next two sets. Williams received a main draw wildcard to the 2023 Australian Open but was forced to withdraw after sustaining an injury in her second round match against Lin in Auckland. The injury caused Williams to miss the rest of the hard court swing and the clay season.

Williams received a wildcard at the Rosmalen Grass Court Championships where she lost in the first round to Céline Naef. Venus then competed in the 2023 Birmingham Classic and won her first match as a 43-year-old, defeating Camilla Giorgi in over three hours in an epic three-set thriller. It was her first victory over a top 50 player in almost four years. The success was short-lived, and Williams fell in the second round to Jelena Ostapenko in another close three-set match. Williams continued to be hampered by injuries during the match and received an off-court medical timeout. Williams received a wildcard to the 2023 Wimbledon main draw but lost in straight sets to Elina Svitolina in the first round, suffering a serious knee injury. Williams expressed frustration at her improving form being affected by injuries, stating in her post-match press conference that the injuries were "hard to process emotionally, mentally and physically on the court".

Williams lost in the first round of the Canadian Open in Montreal but secured her first Top 20 win in more than four years with a straight sets win over No. 16 seed Veronika Kudermetova in the Western & Southern Open. She followed that win with a lopsided first set win over rising star Zheng Qinwen but eventually lost the next two sets and the match. The first set was described as "vintage Venus" and gave hope for Williams's return to the US Open.

At the US Open, in her first round match, which was also Williams's 100th career US Open match, she suffered one of her most lopsided Grand Slam losses, winning only two games against qualifier Greet Minnen.

Williams ended the 2023 season ranked No. 412 in the world.

=== 2024–2026: Multiple wildcards, losing streak ===
Despite her injury-plagued season in 2023, Williams announced her intention to return to action in March 2024. While her injuries forced her to miss the Australian summer hardcourt swing, she said her target was to participate in the US hardcourt tournaments in Indian Wells and Miami. She lost in the first round of both tournaments to Nao Hibino and Diana Shnaider respectively.

In 2025, Williams again received a main-draw wildcard for Indian Wells, but she turned it down. While attending the Met Gala in May 2025, Williams denied that she has retired, and she said that she will return to the court "when the time feels right". In July, Williams accepted a wildcard entry for the 2025 Washington Open, beating Peyton Stearns in the first round. She also reached the doubles quarterfinal with Hailey Baptiste.

Williams then lost in the first round at 2025 Cincinnati Open to Jessica Bouzas Maneiro and at 2025 US Open to Karolína Muchová. She also lost in the opening round in mixed doubles with Reilly Opelka, but she managed to reach her first Grand Slam quarterfinal since 2017 in women's doubles alongside Leylah Fernandez, at which point they were eliminated by top seeds Kateřina Siniaková and Taylor Townsend.

In 2026, Williams received a wildcard to the Auckland Open, but was eliminated in the first round by Magda Linette. The following week, she was a wildcard entry at the Hobart International, where she was eliminated in straight sets by Tatjana Maria in the first round. Their combined ages, 84, set a record for the highest combined age of a match in the history of the WTA Tour. She then received another wildcard, this time to the Australian Open, where she was eliminated in the first round by Olga Danilović. Williams received a wildcard entry into the main-draw at the 2026 Madrid Open, losing to Kaitlin Quevedo in the first round to become the first former world No. 1 to be defeated in 10 successive singles matches since the rankings were first published in 1975. At the same tournament, she teamed up with Katie Boulter in the doubles and the wildcard pairing overcame Jiang Xinyu and Xu Yifan, before losing to seventh seeds Sofia Kenin and Hsieh Su-wei in the second round.

== Fight for equal prize money ==
Despite years of protests by tennis pioneer Billie Jean King and others, the French Open and Wimbledon still refused to pay women's and men's players equally through all rounds as of 2005. That year, Williams privately met with officials from both tournaments, arguing for complete equal prize money.

The turning point was an essay by Williams published in The Times on the eve of Wimbledon in 2006, in which she accused Wimbledon of being on the "wrong side of history". British Prime Minister Tony Blair and members of Parliament publicly endorsed Williams's arguments. Later that year, the Women's Tennis Association and UNESCO teamed for a campaign to promote gender equality in sports, asking Williams to lead the campaign. Under enormous pressure, Wimbledon announced in February 2007 that it would award equal prize money to all competitors in all rounds; the French Open followed suit a day later. In the aftermath, the Chicago Sun-Times cited Williams as "the single factor" that "changed the minds of the boys" and a leader whose "willingness to take a public stand separates her not only from most of her female peers, but also from our most celebrated male athletes". Williams herself commented, "Somewhere in the world a little girl is dreaming of holding a giant trophy in her hands and being viewed as an equal to boys who have similar dreams."

Williams herself became the first woman to benefit from equal prize money at Wimbledon, as she won the 2007 edition and was awarded the same amount as the men's champion, Roger Federer. Williams's fight for equality was documented in Nine for IX, Venus Vs. It premiered on July 2, 2013.

== Other on court activities ==
=== 1998: Karsten Braasch vs. the Williams sisters ===
Williams, along with her sister Serena, competed in a "Battle of the Sexes" against Karsten Braasch at the 1998 Australian Open. Braasch, the world's 203rd-ranked player, was more than 13 years older than the sisters and was described by a journalist as "a man whose training regime centered around a pack of cigarettes and more than a couple bottles of ice cold lager." He defeated both sisters in a single set against each, beating Serena 6–1 and Venus 6–2.

== Playing style ==
Williams is an aggressive player, with an all-court game. Due to her assertive playing style, she typically accumulates large numbers of both winners and unforced errors. She possesses powerful groundstrokes on both sides, and is capable of hitting both her forehand and backhand flat, and with topspin. She is also adept at hitting her backhand with slice to slow down rallies and disrupt pace within rallies. Her serve is powerful, allowing her to serve numerous aces in any match. At the peak of her career, her first serve would average 182 km/h (113 mph), and would frequently peak at 199 km/h (124 mph); her serve has slowed since then, averaging 172 km/h (107 mph), and peaking at 189 km/h (117 mph). She possesses effective kick and slice serves, which she deploys as second serves, preventing opponents from scoring free points. Up to 2014, she held the record for the fastest serve on the WTA Tour, recorded at the 2007 US Open, at 208 km/h (129 mph). She likes to approach the net, and finish points quickly. Her height, at 6 ft 1 in (1.85 m), provides her with a long arm span, allowing her to reach difficult returns while positioned at the net. She has a repertoire of shots to perform at the net, which leads to many won points.

Due to her all-court game, Williams can hit winners from any position. A tactical player with problem-solving skills, she relies on defense infrequently, rarely hitting drop shots and lobs, as her speed and court coverage allow her to hit with assertive power and strength from frequently defensive positions. Further strengths include her intricate footwork, and supreme athleticism.

== Personal life ==
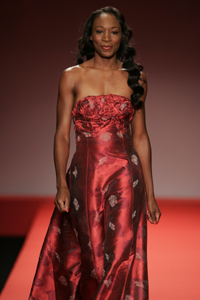
Williams for the National Heart, Lung, and Blood Institute's "National Wear Red Day"

In 2003, Yetunde Price, Venus and Serena Williams's 31-year-old sister and their personal assistant, was shot dead in Compton, California, near the courts on which the sisters once practiced.

In 2007, Williams received her associate degree in fashion design from the Art Institute of Fort Lauderdale.

In 2011, Williams was forced to withdraw from the US Open before her second-round match following a Sjögren's syndrome diagnosis. After the diagnosis, she adopted a vegan diet and reduced her intake of calories and sugars.

In 2015, Williams received a Bachelor of Science degree in business administration from Indiana University East. She began her degree in 2011 through a reciprocal agreement between the university and the Women's Tennis Association that allows athletes to play tennis professionally while studying online.

Williams was raised as a Jehovah's Witness.

In July 2025, Williams opened up about her decades-long struggle with adenomyosis and uterine fibroids, detailing the impact it had on her career and life, as well as the lack of knowledge and proper support from doctors that delayed diagnosis and treatment.

=== Relationships ===
Williams has dated golfer Hank Kuehne. In 2012, she met Cuban model Elio Pis when he was hired as an underwear model for her clothing line; they dated until 2015. She dated publishing heir Nicholas Hammond for two years until 2019. On December 19, 2025, following a previous September 18 wedding in Ischia, Italy, Williams officially married actor-producer Andrea Preti.

=== 2017 car crash ===
On June 9, 2017, Williams was driving in Palm Beach Gardens, Florida, when another car collided with hers. The crash killed a 78-year-old man and injured another person. Police originally said that Williams was at fault for the crash, but on December 21, 2017, authorities determined that it was caused by an unidentified third driver.

=== Business ventures ===
Williams is the chief executive officer of her interior design firm V Starr Interiors, located in Jupiter, Florida. Her company designed the set of the Tavis Smiley Show on the Public Broadcasting Service, the Olympic athletes' apartments as part of New York City's failed bid to host the 2012 Summer Olympics, and residences and businesses in the Palm Beach, Florida area.

In 2001, Williams was named among the 30 most powerful women in America by the Ladies Home Journal.

In 2007, Williams teamed with retailer Steve & Barry's to launch her own fashion line, EleVen. "I love fashion and the idea that I am using my design education to actually create clothing and footwear that I will wear on and off the tennis court is a dream come true for me" Williams's line debuted during the 2012 New York fashion week. It was modeled by athletes rather than models, as Williams chose to feature the type of people for whom the line was designed. She also wears outfits from her fashion line on the tennis court.

In June 2009, Williams was named 77th in the Top 100 Most Powerful Celebrities list compiled by Forbes magazine.

In August 2009, Williams and her sister Serena became minority owners of the Miami Dolphins. This made the sisters the first African-American women to obtain ownership in an NFL franchise.

In late June 2010, Williams released her first book, Come to Win; On How Sports Can Help You Top Your Profession, which she cowrote with Kelly E. Carter. To promote the book, she embarked on a nationwide tour and appeared on several talk shows, including The Early Show and Good Morning America. The book reached the top five on The New York Times Best Seller list.

== Recognition ==
Williams is widely regarded as one of the greatest tennis players of all time.

In 2005, Tennis Magazine ranked Williams as the 25th-best player of the past 40 years.

In June 2011, she was named one of the "30 Legends of Women's Tennis: Past, Present and Future" by Time.

In 2018, Tennis Magazine ranked Williams as the eighth-best female player of the Open Era.

In May 2020, both the Tennis Channel and Newsday ranked Williams as the eighth-greatest female player of all time.

== Equipment ==
In 1995, when Williams was 14, she signed an endorsement deal with Reebok and wore the company's apparel and shoes. She used a Wilson Hammer 6.2 Stretch racket.

== Career statistics ==
=== Grand Slam tournament performance timeline ===
Key
W	F	SF	QF	#R	RR	Q#	DNQ	A	NH

(W) winner; (F) finalist; (SF) semifinalist; (QF) quarterfinalist; (#R) rounds 4, 3, 2, 1; (RR) round-robin stage; (Q#) qualification round; (DNQ) did not qualify; (A) absent; (NH) not held; (SR) strike rate (events won / competed); (W–L) win–loss record.
To avoid confusion and double counting, these charts are updated at the conclusion of a tournament or when the player's participation has ended.

Current through the 2026 US Open.

Tournament	1997	1998	1999	2000	2001	2002	2003	2004	2005	2006	2007	2008	2009	2010	2011	2012	2013	2014	2015	2016	2017	2018	2019	2020	2021	2022	2023	2024	2025	2026	SR	W–L	Win %
Australian Open	A	QF	QF	A	SF	QF	F	3R	4R	1R	A	QF	2R	QF	3R	A	3R	1R	QF	1R	F	1R	3R	1R	2R	A	A	A	A	1R	0 / 22	54–22	71%
French Open	2R	QF	4R	QF	1R	F	4R	QF	3R	QF	3R	3R	3R	4R	A	2R	1R	2R	1R	4R	4R	1R	1R	1R	1R	A	A	A	A	A	0 / 24	48–24	67%
Wimbledon	1R	QF	QF	W	W	F	F	2R	W	3R	W	W	F	QF	4R	1R	A	3R	4R	SF	F	3R	1R	NH	2R	A	1R	A	A	A	5 / 24	90–19	83%
US Open	F	SF	SF	W	W	F	A	4R	QF	A	SF	QF	4R	SF	2R	2R	2R	3R	QF	4R	SF	3R	2R	1R	A	1R	1R	A	1R	1R	2 / 26	79–23	77%
Win–loss	7–3	17–4	15–4	18–1	19–2	22–4	15–3	10–4	16–3	6–3	14–2	17–3	12–4	16–4	6–2	2–3	3–3	5–4	11–4	11–4	20–4	4–4	3–4	0–3	2–3	0–1	0–2	0–0	0–1	0–2	7 / 96	271–88	75%

=== Grand Slam tournament finals ===
==== Singles: 16 (7 titles, 9 runner-ups) ====
Result	Year	Championship	Surface	Opponent	Score
Loss	1997	US Open	Hard	(Switzerland) Martina Hingis	0–6, 4–6
Win	2000	Wimbledon	Grass	(United States) Lindsay Davenport	6–3, 7–6^{(7–3)}
Win	2000	US Open	Hard	(United States) Lindsay Davenport	6–4, 7–5
Win	2001	Wimbledon (2)	Grass	(Belgium) Justine Henin	6–1, 3–6, 6–0
Win	2001	US Open (2)	Hard	(United States) Serena Williams	6–2, 6–4
Loss	2002	French Open	Clay	(United States) Serena Williams	5–7, 3–6
Loss	2002	Wimbledon	Grass	(United States) Serena Williams	6–7^{(4–7)}, 3–6
Loss	2002	US Open	Hard	(United States) Serena Williams	4–6, 3–6
Loss	2003	Australian Open	Hard	(United States) Serena Williams	6–7^{(4–7)}, 6–3, 4–6
Loss	2003	Wimbledon	Grass	(United States) Serena Williams	6–4, 4–6, 2–6
Win	2005	Wimbledon (3)	Grass	(United States) Lindsay Davenport	4–6, 7–6^{(7–4)}, 9–7
Win	2007	Wimbledon (4)	Grass	(France) Marion Bartoli	6–4, 6–1
Win	2008	Wimbledon (5)	Grass	(United States) Serena Williams	7–5, 6–4
Loss	2009	Wimbledon	Grass	(United States) Serena Williams	6–7^{(3–7)}, 2–6
Loss	2017	Australian Open	Hard	(United States) Serena Williams	4–6, 4–6
Loss	2017	Wimbledon	Grass	(Spain) Garbiñe Muguruza	5–7, 0–6

==== Doubles: 14 (14 titles) ====
Result	Year	Championship	Surface	Partner	Opponents	Score
Win	1999	French Open	Clay	(United States) Serena Williams	(Switzerland) Martina Hingis (Russia) Anna Kournikova	6–3, 6–7^{(2–7)}, 8–6
Win	1999	US Open	Hard	(United States) Serena Williams	(United States) Chanda Rubin (France) Sandrine Testud	4–6, 6–1, 6–4
Win	2000	Wimbledon	Grass	(United States) Serena Williams	(France) Julie Halard-Decugis (Japan) Ai Sugiyama	6–3, 6–2
Win	2001	Australian Open	Hard	(United States) Serena Williams	(United States) Lindsay Davenport (United States) Corina Morariu	6–2, 2–6, 6–4
Win	2002	Wimbledon (2)	Grass	(United States) Serena Williams	(Spain) Virginia Ruano Pascual (Argentina) Paola Suárez	6–2, 7–5
Win	2003	Australian Open (2)	Hard	(United States) Serena Williams	(Spain) Virginia Ruano Pascual (Argentina) Paola Suárez	4–6, 6–4, 6–3
Win	2008	Wimbledon (3)	Grass	(United States) Serena Williams	(United States) Lisa Raymond (Australia) Samantha Stosur	6–2, 6–2
Win	2009	Australian Open (3)	Hard	(United States) Serena Williams	(Slovakia) Daniela Hantuchová (Japan) Ai Sugiyama	6–3, 6–3
Win	2009	Wimbledon (4)	Grass	(United States) Serena Williams	(Australia) Samantha Stosur (Australia) Rennae Stubbs	7–6^{(7–4)}, 6–4
Win	2009	US Open (2)	Hard	(United States) Serena Williams	(Zimbabwe) Cara Black (United States) Liezel Huber	6–2, 6–2
Win	2010	Australian Open (4)	Hard	(United States) Serena Williams	(Zimbabwe) Cara Black (United States) Liezel Huber	6–4, 6–3
Win	2010	French Open (2)	Clay	(United States) Serena Williams	(Czech Republic) Květa Peschke (Slovenia) Katarina Srebotnik	6–2, 6–3
Win	2012	Wimbledon (5)	Grass	(United States) Serena Williams	(Czech Republic) Andrea Hlaváčková (Czech Republic) Lucie Hradecká	7–5, 6–4
Win	2016	Wimbledon (6)	Grass	(United States) Serena Williams	(Hungary) Tímea Babos (Kazakhstan) Yaroslava Shvedova	6–3, 6–4

==== Mixed doubles: 3 (2 titles, 1 runner-up) ====
Result	Year	Championship	Surface	Partner	Opponents	Score
Win	1998	Australian Open	Hard	(United States) Justin Gimelstob	(Czechoslovakia) Helena Suková (Czechoslovakia) Cyril Suk	6–2, 6–1
Win	1998	French Open	Clay	(United States) Justin Gimelstob	(United States) Serena Williams (Argentina) Luis Lobo	6–4, 6–4
Loss	2006	Wimbledon	Grass	(United States) Bob Bryan	(Russia) Vera Zvonareva (Israel) Andy Ram	3–6, 2–6

== World Team Tennis ==
Williams has played 14 seasons of World TeamTennis, making her debut in 2000 with the St. Louis Aces, playing a season with the Delaware Smash in 2005, three seasons with the Philadelphia Freedoms from 2006 to 2008, and eight seasons with the Washington Kastles in 2010–2015, 2017–2019. She has five King Trophies, claiming her first with the Freedoms in 2006 and four trophies with the Kastles in 2011, 2012, 2014, and 2015. She was also named the 2012 WTT Final MVP for her efforts. It was announced she will be joining the Washington Kastles during the 2020 WTT season set to begin July 12 at The Greenbrier.

== Records and achievements ==
At the 2026 Australian Open, Williams extended her record as the all-time leader, male or female, in Grand Slam singles tournaments played, with her 95th appearance. With her run to the 2017 Wimbledon singles final, she claimed the record for the longest time between a player's first and most recent major singles finals appearances (a record later surpassed by her sister Serena at the 2019 US Open). Venus won four Olympic gold medals (one in singles and three in women's doubles with her sister) and one silver (in mixed doubles), equal to Kathleen McKane Godfree for the most Olympic medals won by a tennis player in history. At the 2000 Sydney Olympics, she became only the second player to win Olympic gold medals in both singles and doubles at one Olympic Games. After winning silver in mixed doubles with Rajeev Ram at the 2016 Rio de Janeiro Olympics, Williams became the first tennis player to win a medal at four Olympic Games, as well as the first player in the Open Era to win an Olympic medal in all three events (singles, doubles, mixed). She and Serena are also the only tennis players in history with four Olympic gold medals, as well as the only ones to win Olympic gold in the same event on three occasions. She along with her sister Serena are the only women in the Open Era to win Olympic tennis gold in both singles and doubles.

- These records were attained in Open era of tennis.
- Records in **bold** indicate peer-less achievements.
- Records in italics are currently active streaks.

Championship	Years	Record accomplished	Player tied
1997 French Open – 2026 Australian Open	1997–2026	most appearances (95) in Grand Slam singles draw	**stands alone**
1999 French Open – 2016 Wimbledon	1999–2016	first 14 Grand Slam doubles finals won (with Serena Williams)	Serena Williams
2002 French Open – 2003 Australian Open	2002–2003	four consecutive runner-up finishes	**stands alone**
2002 French Open – 2003 Australian Open	2002–2003	four consecutive runner-up finishes to the same player (Serena Williams)	**stands alone**
2003 Australian Open – 2017 Australian Open	2003–2017	14 years between first and last final	Chris Evert; Serena Williams
2000 Wimbledon – 2017 Wimbledon	2000–2017	17 years between first and last final	Serena Williams
Wimbledon	2005	longest women's singles final (2h 45min)	Lindsay Davenport
Wimbledon	2007	lowest-ranked champion (31st)	**stands alone**
Wimbledon	2007	lowest-seeded champion (23rd)	**stands alone**
Wimbledon	2008	fastest serve by a woman (129 mph)	**stands alone**
US Open	2007	fastest serve by a woman (129 mph)	**stands alone**
Summer Olympics	2000–2012	4 Olympic gold medals	Serena Williams
Summer Olympics	2000–2016	5 Olympic finals	**stands alone**
Summer Olympics	2000–2012	3 doubles Olympic gold medals (with Serena Williams)	Serena Williams
Summer Olympics	2000–2016	most Olympic medals won by a male or female player (5)	Kathleen McKane Godfree
Summer Olympics	2000–2016	has won an Olympic medal in all three events (singles, doubles & mixed)	Kathleen McKane Godfree
Summer Olympics	2000–2016	has won an Olympic medal at four Olympic Games	**stands alone**
Miami Open	1998–2002	22 consecutive singles matches won at this tournament	Steffi Graf
Dubai Tennis Championships	2009–2015	16 consecutive singles matches won at this tournament	**stands alone**
Dubai Tennis Championships	2010–2014	2 consecutive singles titles without dropping a set	Justine Henin
Dubai Tennis Championships	2014	only unseeded player to have won in singles and as a wildcard	**stands alone**
Connecticut Open	1999–2002	4 consecutive singles titles	Caroline Wozniacki
Connecticut Open	1999–2000	2 consecutive singles titles without dropping a set	**stands alone**
U.S. National Indoor Tennis Championships	1998–2007	most singles titles won at this tournament (3)	**stands alone**
Southern California Open	1999–2002	4 consecutive singles finals	Tracy Austin
Mexican Open	2009–2010	2 consecutive singles titles	Sara Errani; Lesia Tsurenko
Year-end championships	1998–2008–2015	won all 3 titles Grand Slam Cup, WTA Finals and WTA Elite Trophy in singles	**stands alone**

== Awards ==
1995

- Sports Image Foundation Award for conducting tennis clinics in low-income areas

1997

- WTA Newcomer of the Year
- September's Olympic Committee Female Athlete

1998

- Tennis Magazine's Most Improved Player

2000

- WTA Player of the Year
- WTA Doubles Team of the Year (with Serena Williams)
- Sports Illustrated for Women's Sportswoman of the Year
- Teen Choice Awards – Extraordinary Achievement Award
- Forbes The Celebrity 100 (No. 62)
- Women's Sports Foundation Sportswoman of the Year for team sports (with Serena Williams)

2001

- Best Female Tennis Player ESPY Award
- EMMA Best Sport Personality Award
- Forbes The Celebrity 100 (No. 57)

2002

- Best Female Athlete ESPY Award
- Best Female Tennis Player ESPY Award
- Forbes The Celebrity 100 (No. 60)

2003

- The President's Award of the 34th NAACP Image Awards
- Forbes The Celebrity 100 (No. 65)

2004

- Harris Poll Top 10 Favorite Female Sports Star (No. 1)
- Forbes The Celebrity 100 (No. 77)

2005

- Glamour Magazine's Women of the Year Award
- Forbes The Celebrity 100 (No. 81)
- Harris Poll Top 10 Favorite Female Sports Star (No. 3)

2006

- Best Female Tennis Player ESPY Award
- BET's Best Female Athlete of the Year
- Harris Poll Top 10 Favorite Female Sports Star (No. 1)
- Forbes The Celebrity 100 (No. 90)

2007

- Gitanjali Diamond Award
- Harris Poll Top 10 Favorite Female Sports Star (No. 3)
- Vogue Magazine Top 10 Best Dressed List for 2007

2008

- Whirlpool 6th Sense Player of the Year Award
- Harris Poll Top 10 Favorite Female Sports Star (No. 3)
- Anti-Defamation League Americanism Award
- Whirlpool 6th Sense Player of the Year Award
- ITF Women's Doubles World Champion (with Serena Williams)
- WTA Doubles Team of the Year (with Serena Williams)
- WTA Fan Favorite Doubles Team of the Year (with Serena Williams)
- Doha 21st Century Leaders Awards – Outstanding Leadership
- Forbes The Celebrity 100 (No. 77)
- Harris Poll Top 10 Favorite Female Sports Star (No. 2)

2009

- WTA doubles team of the year (with Serena Williams)
- WTA Fan Favorite Doubles Team of the Year (with Serena Williams)

2010

- Caesars Tennis Classic Achievement Award
- Forbes The Celebrity 100 (No. 83)
- YWCA GLA Phenomenal Woman of the Year Award
- WTA Fan Favorite Doubles Team of the Year (with Serena Williams)
- Forbes 30 Utterly Inspiring Role Models
- Forbes 100 Most Powerful Women in the World (No. 60)
- Harris Poll Top 10 Favorite Female Sports Star (No. 2)
- Jefferson Award for Outstanding Public Service in Professional Sports

2011

- Forbes The Celebrity 100 (No. 86)
- TIME Magazine 30 Legends of Women's Tennis
- Forbes Most Powerful Black Women In The U.S. (No. 10)
- Harris Poll Top 10 Favorite Female Sports Star (No. 2)

2012

- World TeamTennis Finals Most Valuable Player
- WTA Player Service Award
- WTA Fan Favorite Doubles Team of the Year (with Serena Williams)

2013

- BET Black Girls Rock! Star Power Award
- Harris Poll Top 10 Favorite Female Sports Star (No. 3)
- WTA Player Service Award

2014

- Harris Poll Top 10 Favorite Female Sports Star (No. 3)
- WTA Fan Favorite Dress (2014 Wimbledon)
- Tennis Magazine Top 10 Matches of 2014 No. 3 (2014 Wimbledon 3rd Round)
- ESPN Tennis Top 10 Women's Matches of 2014 No. 3 (2014 Wimbledon 3rd Round)

2015

- US Open Sportsmanship Award
- WTA February Best Dressed Player
- WTA French Open Best Dressed Player
- WTA October Best Dressed Player
- Harris Poll Top 10 Favorite Female Sports Star (No. 3)
- Harris Poll Top 10 Greatest Tennis Player (No. 5)
- WTA Comeback Player of the Year
- WTA Social Fan Favorite – #TBT of the Year

2016

- Sports Illustrated Fashionable 50 Athletes
- Nielsen Most Marketable Athletes in the U.S. (No. 6)

2017

- ESPN WTA Player of the Year
- Nielsen Most Marketable Athletes in the U.S. (No. 2)
- Sports Illustrated Fashionable 50 Athletes
- Sports Illustrated Fashionable 50 The Athleisure Leader Award

2018

- Sports Illustrated Fashionable 50 Athletes

2019

- Sports Illustrated Fashionable 50 Athletes

2022

- Sports Illustrated 100 Influential Black Women in Sports

== Filmography ==
- Venus and Serena (2012), documentary film that takes an inside look at lives and careers of professional tennis players, Venus and Serena Williams.
- King Richard (2021, executive producer), biographical sports drama film on Venus and Serena Williams.

=== Television ===
Year	Title	Role	Network	Notes
2020	Game On!	Self	CBS	Also executive producer

== See also ==
- Williams sisters
- WTA Tour records
- Grand Slam (tennis)
- Tennis at the Summer Olympics
- List of WTA number 1 ranked singles tennis players
- List of WTA number 1 ranked doubles tennis players
- List of highest ranked tennis players per country
- List of female tennis players
- List of tennis tournaments
- List of tennis rivalries
- Tennis records of the Open Era – Women's singles
- All-time tennis records – women's singles
- Graf–Navratilova rivalry
- Graf–Sabatini rivalry
- Graf–Seles rivalry
- Hingis – V. Williams rivalry
- Williams sisters rivalry
- List of Grand Slam women's singles champions
- List of Grand Slam women's doubles champions
- List of Grand Slam mixed doubles champions

Sporting positions
Preceded by Jennifer Capriati; Jennifer Capriati; Jennifer Capriati	World No. 1 February 25, 2002 – March 17, 2002; April 22, 2002 – May 19, 2002; June 10, 2002 – July 7, 2002	Succeeded by Jennifer Capriati; Jennifer Capriati; Serena Williams
Awards and achievements
Preceded by Anna Kournikova	WTA Newcomer of the Year; 1997	Succeeded by Serena Williams
Preceded by Lindsay Davenport	WTA Player of The Year; 2000	Succeeded by Jennifer Capriati
Preceded by Martina Hingis & Anna Kournikova; Cara Black & Liezel Huber	WTA Doubles Team of the Year; 2000 (with Serena Williams); 2009, 2010 (with Serena Williams)	Succeeded by Lisa Raymond & Rennae Stubbs; Gisela Dulko & Flavia Pennetta
Preceded by Lindsay Davenport; Maria Sharapova	Best Female Tennis Player ESPY Award; 2001-2002; 2006	Succeeded by Serena Williams; Maria Sharapova
Preceded by Lindsay Davenport	Best Female Athlete ESPY Award; 2002	Succeeded by Serena Williams
Preceded by Cara Black & Liezel Huber	ITF Women's Doubles World Champion; 2009 (with Serena Williams)	Incumbent
Preceded by First Award; Maria Kirilenko & Victoria Azarenka	WTA Fan Favorite Doubles Team of the Year; 2010 (with Serena Williams); 2012 (with Serena Williams)	Succeeded by Maria Kirilenko & Victoria Azarenka; Ekaterina Makarova & Elena Vesnina
Preceded by Francesca Schiavone	WTA Player Service; 2012	Incumbent
Preceded by Mirjana Lučić-Baroni	WTA Comeback Player of the Year; 2015	Succeeded by Dominika Cibulková
Records
Preceded by Brenda Schultz-McCarthy	Fastest serve world record holder July 20, 1998 – July 29, 2014	Succeeded by Sabine Lisicki
