= 1994 Bank of the West Classic – Doubles =

Doubles
- 1994 Bank of the West Classic

Final
- Champions: (United States) Lindsay Davenport (Spain) Arantxa Sánchez Vicario
- Runners-up: (United States) Gigi Fernández (United States) Martina Navratilova
- Score: 7–5, 6–4

Events
Singles	Doubles
← 1993 ·	Silicon Valley Classic	· 1995 →

Patty Fendick and Meredith McGrath were the defending champions, but lost in the semifinals to Lindsay Davenport and Arantxa Sánchez Vicario.

Davenport and Sánchez Vicario won the title by defeating Gigi Fernández and Martina Navratilova 7–5, 6–4 in the final.

== Seeds ==
1. (United States) Gigi Fernández / (United States) Martina Navratilova (final)
2. (United States) Patty Fendick / (United States) Meredith McGrath (semifinals)
3. (United States) Lindsay Davenport / (Spain) Arantxa Sánchez Vicario (champions)
4. (United States) Pam Shriver / (Australia) Elizabeth Smylie (quarterfinals)

== Draw ==
=== Key ===
- Q = Qualifier
- WC = Wild card
- LL = Lucky loser
- Alt = Alternate
- SE = Special exempt
- PR = Protected ranking
- ITF = ITF entry
- JE = Junior exempt
- w/o = Walkover
- r = Retired
- d = Defaulted
- SR = Special ranking

=== Draw ===
First round
1	(United States) G Fernández (United States) M Navratilova	6	6
(South Africa) J Kruger (United States) A Leand	4	2
(Canada) J Hetherington (United States) S Stafford	2	7^{9}	6
(United States) C Benjamin (United States) A Henricksson	6	6^{7}	1
4	(United States) P Shriver (Australia) E Smylie	4	6	6
(France) A Dechaume-Balleret (Argentina) P Tarabini	6	1	0
(United Kingdom) Jane Harper (United States) R White	6	6
(Czech Republic) P Langrová (South Africa) R Nideffer	3	4
(United States) E Hakami (United States) J Watanabe	3	3
(United States) Z Garrison-Jackson (United States) D Graham	6	6
(United States) C Kuhlman (United States) C MacGregor	0	r
3	(United States) L Davenport (Spain) A Sánchez Vicario	6
(United States) L McNeil (Australia) R Stubbs	6	6
WC	(United States) S Collins (United States) B Nagelsen	2	2
(United States) A Frazier (United States) K Po	2	5
2	(United States) P Fendick (United States) M McGrath	6	7

Quarterfinals
1	(United States) G Fernández (United States) M Navratilova	6	6
(Canada) J Hetherington (United States) S Stafford	1	4
4	(United States) P Shriver (Australia) E Smylie	4	6	2
(United Kingdom) Jane Harper (United States) R White	6	2	6
(United States) Z Garrison-Jackson (United States) D Graham	4	3
3	(United States) L Davenport (Spain) A Sánchez Vicario	6	6
(United States) L McNeil (Australia) R Stubbs	1	5
2	(United States) P Fendick (United States) M McGrath	6	7

Semifinals
1	(United States) G Fernández (United States) M Navratilova	6	6
(United Kingdom) Jane Harper (United States) R White	0	3
3	(United States) L Davenport (Spain) A Sánchez Vicario	6	7
2	(United States) P Fendick (United States) M McGrath	1	5

Final
1	(United States) G Fernández (United States) M Navratilova	5	4
3	(United States) L Davenport (Spain) A Sánchez Vicario	7	6
